= Warkworth =

Warkworth may refer to

== People ==
- John Warkworth
- Baron Warkworth, subsidiary title of the Duke of Northumberland

== Places ==
Australia

- Warkworth, New South Wales

Canada

- Warkworth, Ontario, Canada
- Warkworth Institution, Canadian correctional facility

England

- Warkworth, Northamptonshire
- Warkworth, Northumberland
  - Warkworth Castle
  - Warkworth Hermitage
  - Warkworth railway station

New Zealand

- Warkworth, New Zealand
  - Warkworth Radio Astronomical Observatory (Warkworth Radio Telescope, Warkworth 2 dish ...)
