= Wambo Homestead =

- Location within New South Wales Location within Australia
- 32.5865°S 150.9914°E
- Location: Warkworth, Singleton Council, New South Wales, Australia

History
- Built: 1830–1906

Site notes
- Owner: Wambo Mining Corporation Pty Ltd

New South Wales Heritage Register
- Official name: Wambo Homestead; Wambo Homestead Complex
- Type: state heritage (landscape)
- Designated: 2 April 1999
- Reference no.: 200
- Type: Homestead Complex
- Category: Farming and Grazing

Wambo Homestead is a heritage-listed disused homestead at Warkworth, Singleton Council, New South Wales, Australia. It was built from 1830 to 1906. It was added to the New South Wales State Heritage Register on 2 April 1999.

== History ==
=== Aboriginal presence ===
Wambo Homestead is located close to the junction of the traditional boundaries of the Kamilaroi and the Wonaruah peoples. The Kamilaroi extended west to the Namoi and Barwon Rivers, and across the Liverpool Plains. The Wonaruah, who were closely affiliated with the Kamilaroi, occupied the central Hunter Valley area from around Merriwa and the Goulburn River, north to the Paterson. Europeans made contact with both groups when trying to cross the Blue Mountains from Windsor. Archaeological surveys have identified a number of Aboriginal camp sites at the Wambo mine site.

Following European settlement, Aboriginal people remained around Wambo and Jerry's Plains, but relations were frequently strained. There is no reported contact between the Wambo settlers and the Kamilaroi or Wonaruah peoples, but there is evidence of an ongoing Aboriginal presence at Wambo from the 1830s, and records of Aboriginal people working on the estate for the Durham family.

=== European settlement of the Hunter Valley ===
In 1813, four well-behaved convicts from the Newcastle penal station were provided with small land grants for farming near Paterson's Plains in the lower Hunter. Convict farming was the only official early settlement allowed in the Hunter Valley which was initially closed to settlers. Governor Macquarie established the new penal settlement in the more remote location of Port Macquarie in 1820 and officially opened up Newcastle and the Hunter Valley to free settlement in 1821.

In 1820, John Howe, a Windsor settler, led a party from Windsor through the Broken Back Ranges to present-day Broke and Jerry's Plains, arriving near Singleton (close to Wambo). He named the wide grassy flood plain St Patricks Plains where he was granted land. This marked the beginnings of European settlement of the middle and upper Hunter Valley.

Rapid European settlement of the Hunter Valley took place between 1822 and 1829. Over 300 farms totalling over 800,000 acres were established on granted and leased land. Most farms were run by resident settlers and most were over 1000 acres. Settlement of the Hunter Valley was either via sea from Sydney, or overland from Windsor. Livestock were largely driven along the overland route.

By the 1830s the Hunter Valley was the most densely settled district outside the Cumberland Plain. Smaller farms, generally less than 100 acres, were established around Maitland, Paterson and Singleton based on land grants that were matched to an applicant's income or capital (as recommended by the Bigge Report). Most of these were the subsistence farms of emancipated convicts or colonial free born.

Larger properties for sheep and cattle grazing with grain growing were generally held by emigrant farmers and worked by assigned convicts (the Hunter Valley having a large proportion of the colony's assigned convicts). By 1828, of the 91 estates in the Hunter Valley that were over 1000 acres, only two were recorded as being owned by ex-convicts.

=== Development of the Wambo Estate 1824-40 ===
Land around Wambo was desirable, close to the Windsor Road and the fertile valley flats of the Wollombi Brook and Hunter River. It was granted early in the European settlement of the Hunter Valley, as 1824 and 1825 land grants to two free emigrants. There is no evidence that either grantee had developed the land or built any substantial structures before both grants were sold to James Hale who established the Wambo Estate.

James Hale arrived in the colony in 1816 as a 20 year old convict who was forwarded to Windsor on assignment. By 1822, Hale had been freed by servitude and was working as an overseer for William Cox in the Hawkesbury. In the 1820s and early 1830s Hale was a contractor to the Colonial Government supplying fresh and salt beef, mutton, flour, maize, firewood and cartage for survey parties departing Windsor. By 1828 he had established himself as a successful Windsor resident and local businessman, being innkeeper of the White Hart Inn at Windsor with 5 assigned servants; 2133 acres of land (11 being cleared); 11 horses; 433 cattle and 1090 sheep.

In 1835, Hale purchased 1218 acres on Wollombi Brook. This marked the beginning of his Hunter Valley landholding interests, which Hale rapidly expanded. Between 1835 and 1837, Hale added a further 10,240 acres in leasehold. This marked him as having an unusually large landholding for a Hunter Valley emancipist. Hale expanded his landholdings in the 1830s and 1840s with purchases in the Liverpool Plains around Inverell, and further west around Coonabarabran.

By 1841 Hale's grazing empire comprised almost 100,000 acres. Most of his properties (like Wambo) were run by managers who lived on site and worked the property with both assigned convicts and newly arrived immigrant labour. James Hale resided at Windsor throughout his ownership of Wambo, in the house he purchased from his former master, William Cox.

=== Wambo Homestead ===
Between c. 1830-33, Hale constructed the first building on the Wambo Estate. The Kitchen Wing was begun as a single storey stone building with a cellar and later extended with an upper level of brick. The stud master's cottage was built in 1840, the carriage house with stables and granary in 1840, and the servants' wing in 1844.

The "New House" was built between 1844 and 1847. Hale was possibly influenced in the design of Wambo by the Colonial Architect Francis Greenway whose work he would have encountered through his close relationship with William Cox. Cox took a number of contracts, where he worked with Greenway, for the construction of public buildings around Windsor. Hale may also have used some of Cox's builders for the construction of Wambo.

By 1844 James Hale was one of the largest 100 landholders in the colony; an established sheep and cattle grazier and wheat farmer with at least 4 assigned convicts working at Wambo. Hale used Wambo as a halfway point for moving sheep between Windsor and his properties on the Liverpool Plains and New England. Over the 1840s to 1870s, the Wambo herd developed into prize-winning bulls and cows at local and Sydney shows.

In 1857, James Hale died, leaving Wambo and many of his other properties to William Durham, the eldest son of his wife Mary from her first marriage. Durham had very likely been the manager of Wambo. Wambo continued in Durham family ownership until 1894 when it was sold. Coal was discovered at Wambo during well-drilling in 1863.

In 1900, the timber Butcher's Hut was built. In 1905, Wambo Estate was purchased by R. C. Allen and Frank Macdonald for use as a thoroughbred stud. Allen and Macdonald implemented a program of timber building in 1906 that included the Slab Horse Boxes and the Mounting Yard and Horse Boxes and fences. In 1906, the property was subdivided, and the Macdonald family purchased the Wambo Homestead block which they held until 1983.

In 1971, the Wambo Mining Corporation bought much of the surrounding land, but not the homestead block itself. Wambo Homestead was classified by the National Trust of Australia in 1981 and a state Permanent Conservation Order over the property was issued in 1982. The Wambo Mining Corporation bought the Wambo Homestead block in 1987 and began mining the area, using the homestead for training and storage until 2000. They vacated the building in 2000. It has subsequently been unused.

In 2010, the now Wambo Coal Pty Ltd sought to delist the homestead complex from the State Heritage Register following changes to state heritage legislation, which if successful would allow them to demolish the property and access underlying coal deposits. The company claimed they would suffer "undue financial hardship" if they had to sacrifice the underlying coal in order to preserve the property, that it was "not rare" and that it was not fit for habitation. The company also offered to move three of the complex buildings to another site. The delisting, demolition and relocation were all opposed by heritage proponents, and the move did not proceed.

In 2012, it was reported that Wambo Coal were looking to find a permanent use for the building, though needing to overcome the challenge of its location within a working mine lease. It was reported at that time that minor stabilisation works had been undertaken and that some repairs were planned in future. In 2013, an oral history project regarding the homestead was undertaken, having been required as a Heritage Council condition of continuing mining works in the vicinity of the house.

== Description ==
The Homestead currently consists of eight buildings, the earliest being the kitchen wing. Originally this was a single storey sandstone building with a cellar, to which a brick upper floor was added. A large brick laundry has also been added.

Other buildings include the Stud Master's Cottage of three rooms and the brick servants wing of three rooms also. All are "Old Colonial Georgian", the earliest European architectural style used in Australia.

Around 1844, the "Victorian Regency" New House was built, constructed of brick and render with a stone base. It is a distinctive single-storey rendered (stucco) brick house, obviously conceived as an architecturally ambitious Regency style villa. Rigorously designed to impress as a tasteful, spare, symmetrical grand homestead residence, it was placed to present to the valley floor and ranges to the south, turning the "old house" into an impressive supporting kitchen and service wing. The four principal rooms, arranged as pairs either side of an axial central flagged hall, are covered by a low, transverse, hipped roof. These are surrounded by a lower skirt of verandahs and verandah room rooms, set at a lower pitch but similarly roofed originally with hardwood shingles.

Other buildings which make up the Homestead are the Slab Carriage House with Stables, the timber slab / rammed earth Butcher's Hut and the Slab Horse Boxes. Other remote structures exist on the property including a large hay barn, silos and fences.

There is rare evidence of extensive early finishes in the fabric of the core group of 1830s and 1840s buildings. The four masonry buildings of this group demonstrate rare retention of all their original joinery.

As a group of buildings, Wambo Homestead is rare in New South Wales in that many outbuildings still remain substantially intact allowing easy understanding of the development of a homestead complex.

=== Modifications and dates ===
- 1830s - Single brick Stud Master's Cottage and Servants Wing constructed possibly while the brick upper floor to the kitchen wing was added.
- 1837 - Homestead was situated on 4480 acres and included a large brick structure with cellars.
- 1844 (circa) - The New House was constructed. The construction of the Carriage House and Stables would have been contemporary with the building of the New House.

== Heritage listing ==
Wambo Homestead Complex is state significant in the context of Australian pastoral activities and horse breeding in New South Wales and for its capacity to demonstrate the development of pastoral and agricultural activity in the Hunter Region—an important early region of colonial settlement.

This significance is strongly demonstrated in the survival of the core group of five early homestead buildings, constructed between the mid 1830s and mid 1840s, and in the relationship of all buildings and structures of the Wambo Homestead Complex to their setting and the landscape.

Wambo Homestead Complex is state significant as an important group of homestead buildings which remain substantially intact and which display the progressive architectural development of a typical Australian homestead group. It is also state significant for its capacity to demonstrate rare evidence of extensive early finishes in the fabric of the core group of 1830s and 1840s buildings, and for the retention of all original joinery of the four masonry buildings of this group. The New House is state significant for its refined design and capacity to demonstrate architectural ambition at an early stage of colonial rural settlement.

Wambo Homestead Complex is state significant for its rarity as an important homestead complex that was established by a former convict in the Hunter Region, where most large estates were established by free settlement. The complex is significant for its associations with its original owner, the emancipist convict James Hale, who was responsible for the complex's core buildings and who, by 1844, had established himself as one of the top 100 landholders in the colony.

Although the Wambo Homestead Complex is in a "rundown" condition, it still maintains and demonstrates its state significance.

Wambo Homestead was listed on the New South Wales State Heritage Register on 2 April 1999 having satisfied the following criteria.

The place is important in demonstrating the course, or pattern, of cultural or natural history in New South Wales.

Wambo Homestead shows the development of pastoral activities in the Hunter Valley after Commissioner John Bigge's reports to the British Government on the state of the colony and its administration.

Wambo Homestead specifically shows the pattern of selection by residents of Windsor via John Howe's newly established Bulga Road. It provides evidence of the rise to wealth of James Hale, a former convict and important resident of Windsor who by the mid 1840s had established himself as a successful entrepreneur and one of the 100 largest landholders in the colony.

Wambo Homestead is a rare example which demonstrates the economic development of the Hunter Valley Region from an agricultural base through sheep, cattle and horse breeding to dairying and presently coal mining. The process involved in gaining the best economic opportunities from the property can be clearly seen.

The place has a strong or special association with a person, or group of persons, of importance of cultural or natural history of New South Wales's history.

As the creation of the convicted thief, James Hale, Wambo Estate demonstrates the enormous opportunities open to the pioneers of New South Wales. Within two decades a farm boy serving a seven year prison term had become wealthy and influential in two districts, the Hawkesbury and the Hunter Valley, and one of the colony's largest landholders. In the Durham period, the property continued to yield affluence to its owners, allowing the children of convicts to control the circumstances of their lives and to live with some style.

The place is important in demonstrating aesthetic characteristics and/or a high degree of creative or technical achievement in New South Wales.

Wambo Homestead remains substantially intact and largely unaltered. The buildings follow the architectural vocabulary of vernacular Georgian England and demonstrate the progressive architectural development of a typical early Australian homestead group. The New House (c. 1847) is state significant for its capacity to demonstrate refined design and architectural ambition at an early stage of colonial settlement through its conception as an architecturally ambitious Regency style villa that was designed to impress as a tasteful, spare, symmetrical grand homestead residence placed to present to the valley floor and ranges to the south.

The place has a strong or special association with a particular community or cultural group in New South Wales for social, cultural or spiritual reasons.

Wambo Homestead demonstrates the opportunities available to energetic people who were transported to NSW in the early decades of the 19th century. Wambo Homestead is significant in terms of its distance from Hales place of residence, Windsor, and because of its position in the broadening agricultural enterprises of pioneer settlers. The group of buildings express the way farms were operated, with an emphasis on manual labour, and the use of the horse for work and transport.

As the residence of William and Sophia Durham the homestead has associative social significance in the Hunter Valley. This is evident in the substantial development of the Homestead in the early years and the descriptions of lifestyle afforded by visiting commentators of the period. Further, the development of the Horse Stud infrastructure by the Allen and McDonald partnership provides physical evidence of the social and sporting aspirations of elite residents of Sydney at the turn of the 20th century.

The place has potential to yield information that will contribute to an understanding of the cultural or natural history of New South Wales.

As an archaeological resource the buildings and surrounding grounds provided an opportunity to contribute to the knowledge regarding the expansion of the colony of New South Wales, its agricultural diversification and everyday life on homestead properties from the 1820s till the 1890s.

The place possesses uncommon, rare or endangered aspects of the cultural or natural history of New South Wales.

As a group of buildings, Wambo Homestead is rare in New South Wales in that many outbuildings still remain substantially intact allowing easy understanding of the development of a homestead complex.

It is rare as a large and important estate established by an emancipated convict in the Hunter Valley, where most such estates were established by free settlers.

The core group of 1830s and 1840s buildings demonstrate rare evidence of extensive early finishes in the building fabric and the retention of all the original joinery in the four masonry buildings of the group.
