= Chain of Ponds Inn =

- Location within New South Wales Location within Australia
- 32.4057°S 151.0251°E
- Location: Old New England Highway, Liddell, Singleton Council, New South Wales, Australia

New South Wales Heritage Register
- Official name: Inn & Outbuildings (former); Chain of Ponds Inn & Outbuildings
- Type: state heritage (built)
- Designated: 2 April 1999
- Reference no.: 242
- Type: Inn/Tavern
- Category: Commercial

Chain of Ponds Inn is a heritage-listed former inn on the Old New England Highway at Liddell, in the Hunter Region of New South Wales, Australia. It is now owned by a mining operation, the Hunter Valley Operations Joint Venture, which adjoins the site. Though commonly known by the one name today, the inn operated under various names throughout its licensed period; it was also known as the Half Way House due to its location between Singleton and Muswellbrook. It was added to the New South Wales State Heritage Register on 2 April 1999.

== History ==
In 1842, the land on which the former inn now stands was granted to Henry Nowland of Muswellbrook, who built the inn in the same year. Nowland's complex included the inn building, a police lockup for prisoners in transport and a stabling area for coaches. The inn served the coaching business along the former route of the New England Highway. A stables and blacksmith premises at the rear of the inn building were likely built later that decade.

Nowland later leased the inn to James Watson, who operated it as the Lady Mary Fitzroy Inn from April 1848. In April 1852, the license passed to Henry Nowland's son, James Nowland, who renamed it the Coach and Horses Inn. It passed through a number of licensees before reverting to James Nowland by 1854, when he renamed it the Star of the North Inn. It was renamed the Traveller's Inn for two periods under another licensee, but had reverted to the Star of the North by April 1861. The license lapsed for a period as coaching trade declined following the opening of the railway, but reopened as a wine bar and shop in the 1870s.

It varied between uses thereafter: it was a residence known as Liddell House for some time, was relicensed for a period, delicensed for the last time c. 1904, and was the local post office from January 1890 until the 1920s. It was a residence for several decades thereafter.

The New England Highway was realigned to bypass the inn site during the twentieth century, reducing its potential for commercial use. In 1966, the property was sold to the Electricity Commission of New South Wales, who had nearby development plans which did not eventuate. It was leased to tenants until it was vacated in 1977. It has remained uninhabited since that time and has suffered significantly from vandalism. It was placed under an Interim Conservation Order in 1981 and a Permanent Conservation Order in 1982. Some stabilisation works took place during the 1980s.

The area now adjoins a Liddell Coal mine site, with drilling taking place from 2015 up to 95 metres from the inn building. A number of basic repairs were conducted in 2015-16 in accordance with mining approval requirements, including repairs to the termite-damaged front verandah, the rebuilding of the fireplace, the deconstruction and preservation of a chimney for future rebuilding, and the installation of timber framing to support remaining chimneys. It is anticipated that blasting on the adjacent site will continue until approximately 2020-21.

== Description ==
The surviving complex includes the former inn building, police lock-up and stables. The windows are boarded up and the buildings surrounded by security fencing to prevent access. A Liddell Coal report described the buildings as "uninhabitable in their current state, primarily as a result of both vandalism and termite damage over the years".

== Heritage listing ==
Chain of Ponds Inn was listed on the New South Wales State Heritage Register on 2 April 1999.
