= Ewbank, Singleton =

Ewbank
- Location within New South Wales Location within Australia
- 32.5629°S 151.1763°E
- Location: 88 George Street, Singleton, Singleton Council, New South Wales, Australia

History
- Built: 1883–1884

Site notes
- Architect(s): Backhouse and Lough

New South Wales Heritage Register
- Official name: Ewbank & Outbuildings; Singleton Bank of NSW manager's residence
- Type: state heritage (built)
- Designated: 2 April 1999
- Reference no.: 174
- Type: Bank
- Category: Commercial

Ewbank is a heritage-listed residence and former bank building at 88 George Street, Singleton, New South Wales, Australia. It was designed by Benjamin Backhouse and built from 1883 to 1884. It was added to the New South Wales State Heritage Register on 2 April 1999.

== History ==
Constructed in 1883–84, Ewbank was built for the Bank of New South Wales as the chambers and residence of its Singleton Branch. It was designed by architect Benjamin Backhouse whose architectural partnership, Backhouse and Lough of Sydney, designed several other chambers/residences for the Bank of New South Wales.

Following downgrading of the bank's requirements, the building was sold to Mr R. Terrey who named it Ewbank and used it as a private residence.

In 1981 the Heritage Council received a nomination from Roslyn Terrey, the owner of Ewbank for the making of a Permanent Conservation Order in respect of the building. Mrs Terrey wanted Ewbank's future to be assured should she not continue to own it.

In view of Ewbank's architectural and historic significance a Permanent Conservation Order was placed over it on 8 January 1982.

In 1989, through the Heritage Assistance Program, Roslyn Terrey received a grant of $30,000 to assist in the carrying out of verandah repairs and repainting of Ewbank.

It was transferred to the State Heritage Register on 2 April 1999.

It was damaged in an October 2017 crash, in which a stolen truck smashed directly into the side of Ewbank. Repairs were completed in 2021.

== Description ==
Ewbank is a two-storey Victorian building located on George Street, the main artery through Singleton. It is constructed of brick which is stuccoed and scribed to look like stone. An important architectural element is its sandstone porch which is unusual for the Singleton district. The building features a slate roof with domed ventilation vents, large pane sash windows, the original cast iron picket fence and gates to both front and side doors, as well as the original cast-iron work to the first floor verandah.

== Heritage listing ==
Ewbank is a distinctive building of unusual quality for the Singleton town area. It is a simple and classic example of Victorian architecture executed by one of the finest exponents of the style. The building is considered one of Backhouse's best architectural resolutions for a corner building. It features prominently in the establishment and development of Singleton. Its location has made it a well known landmark.

Ewbank was listed on the New South Wales State Heritage Register on 2 April 1999 having satisfied the following criteria.

The place is important in demonstrating the course, or pattern, of cultural or natural history in New South Wales.

Ewbank features prominently in the establishment and development of Singleton.

The place is important in demonstrating aesthetic characteristics and/or a high degree of creative or technical achievement in New South Wales.

Ewbank is a distinctive building of unusual quality for the Singleton town area. It is a simple and classic example of Victorian architecture executed by one of the finest exponents of the style. The building is considered one of Backhouse's best architectural resolutions for a corner building.

The place has a strong or special association with a particular community or cultural group in New South Wales for social, cultural or spiritual reasons.

Its location has made it a well known landmark.
