= Warkworth, New South Wales =

Warkworth New South Wales
- Coordinates: 32°34′30″S 151°01′00″E
- Population: 42 (SAL 2021)
- Postcode(s): 2330
- Elevation: 65 m (213 ft)
- Location: 22 km (14 mi) W of Singleton; 58 km (36 mi) SE of Muswellbrook; 90 km (56 mi) NW of Newcastle; 222 km (138 mi) N of Sydney
- LGA(s): Singleton Council
- State electorate(s): Upper Hunter
- Federal division(s): Hunter
Localities around Warkworth:
Liddell	Ravensworth	Maison Dieu
Lemington	Warkworth	Gouldsville
Bulga	Bulga	Mount Thorley

Warkworth is a locality in the Singleton Council region of New South Wales, Australia. It had a population of 42 as of the 2021 census.

Warkworth Post Office opened on 1 November 1863 and closed on 30 November 1968.

Warkworth Public School opened as Cockfighter's Creek in May 1859, was renamed Warkworth that June, closed in March 1861, reopened in 1869 and closed in February 1997.

St Philip's Anglican Church has an active congregation and holds fortnightly services. It has a church cemetery with graves dating from 1854 until the present day. The remains of the former Warkworth General Cemetery adjoin the ongoing Anglican cemetery.

It contains an active open-cut coal mine, operated jointly with another mine at Mount Thorley as the Mount Thorley Warkworth operation. It has been owned by Yancoal since 2017.

== Heritage listings ==
Warkworth has a number of heritage-listed sites, including:

- Wambo Homestead
