= St Patrick's Roman Catholic Church Cemetery =

- Location within New South Wales Location within Australia
- 32°33′35″S 151°10′52″E
- Location: Queen Street, Singleton, Singleton Council, New South Wales, Australia

Site notes
- Owner: Catholic Church Singleton

New South Wales Heritage Register
- Official name: St. Patrick's Roman Catholic Church Cemetery
- Type: State heritage (landscape)
- Designated: 2 April 1999
- Reference no.: 233
- Type: Cemetery/Graveyard/Burial Ground
- Category: Cemeteries and Burial Sites

St Patrick's Roman Catholic Church Cemetery is a heritage-listed Roman Catholic cemetery at Queen Street, Singleton, Singleton Council, New South Wales, Australia. It was added to the New South Wales State Heritage Register on 2 April 1999.

== History ==
The cemetery, which adjoins St Patrick's Catholic Church, was first established in 1842. The first recorded burial was in 1844, and the cemetery was consecrated by Anglican Archbishop of Sydney, Bede Polding in 1845.

A Wesleyan (Methodist) section was established in the 1860s. Two stone towers were added to the entry in 1920.

A columbarium was established c. early 1980s, with plaques dating from 1982.

== Description ==
The cemetery contains approximately 500 burials and 400 monuments. It continues to have Catholic and Methodist sections.

== Heritage listing ==
St Patrick's Roman Catholic Church Cemetery was listed on the New South Wales State Heritage Register on 2 April 1999.

== See also ==
- List of cemeteries in New South Wales
- Roman Catholic Church in Australia
