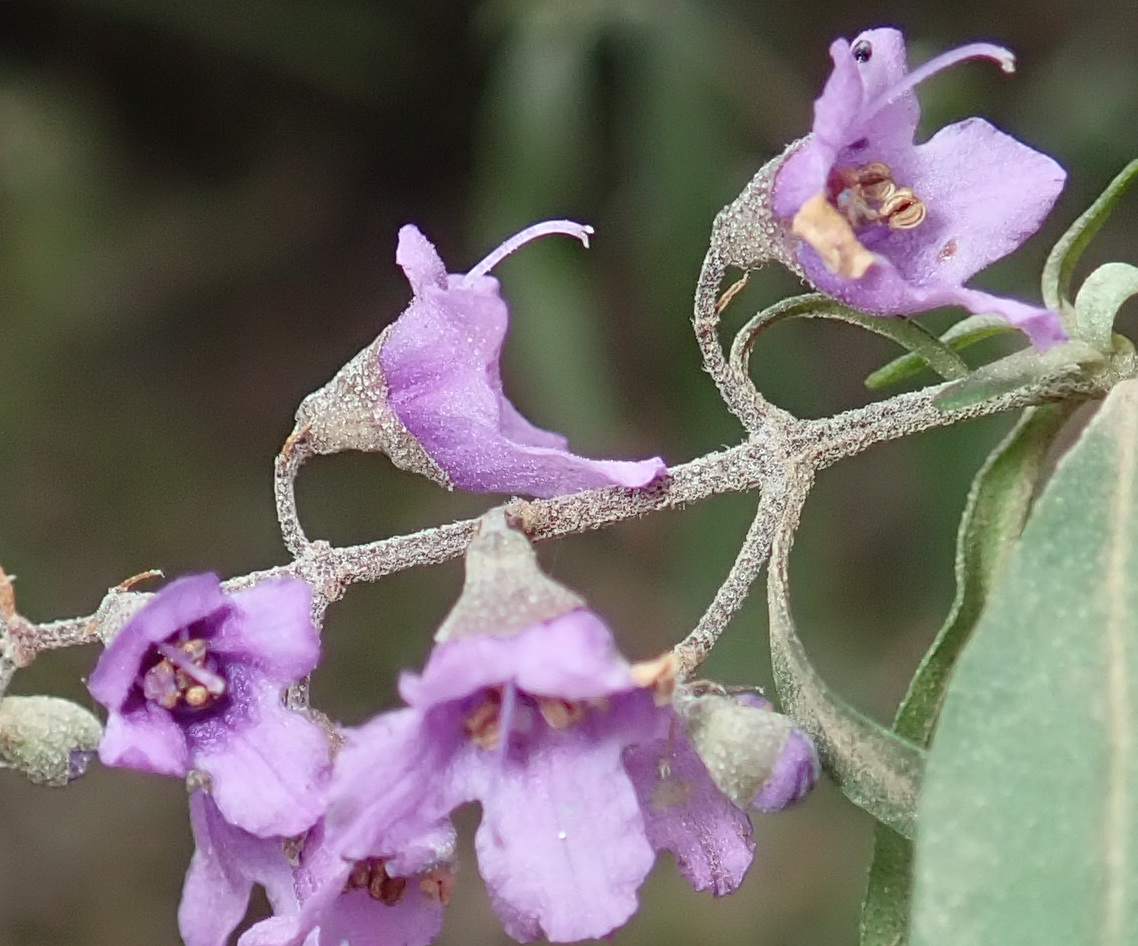

Conservation status
- Vulnerable (EPBC Act)

Scientific classification
- Kingdom: Plantae
- Clade: Tracheophytes
- Clade: Angiosperms
- Clade: Eudicots
- Clade: Asterids
- Order: Lamiales
- Family: Lamiaceae
- Genus: Prostanthera
- Species: P. cineolifera

Binomial name
- Prostanthera cineolifera R.T.Baker & H.G.Sm.
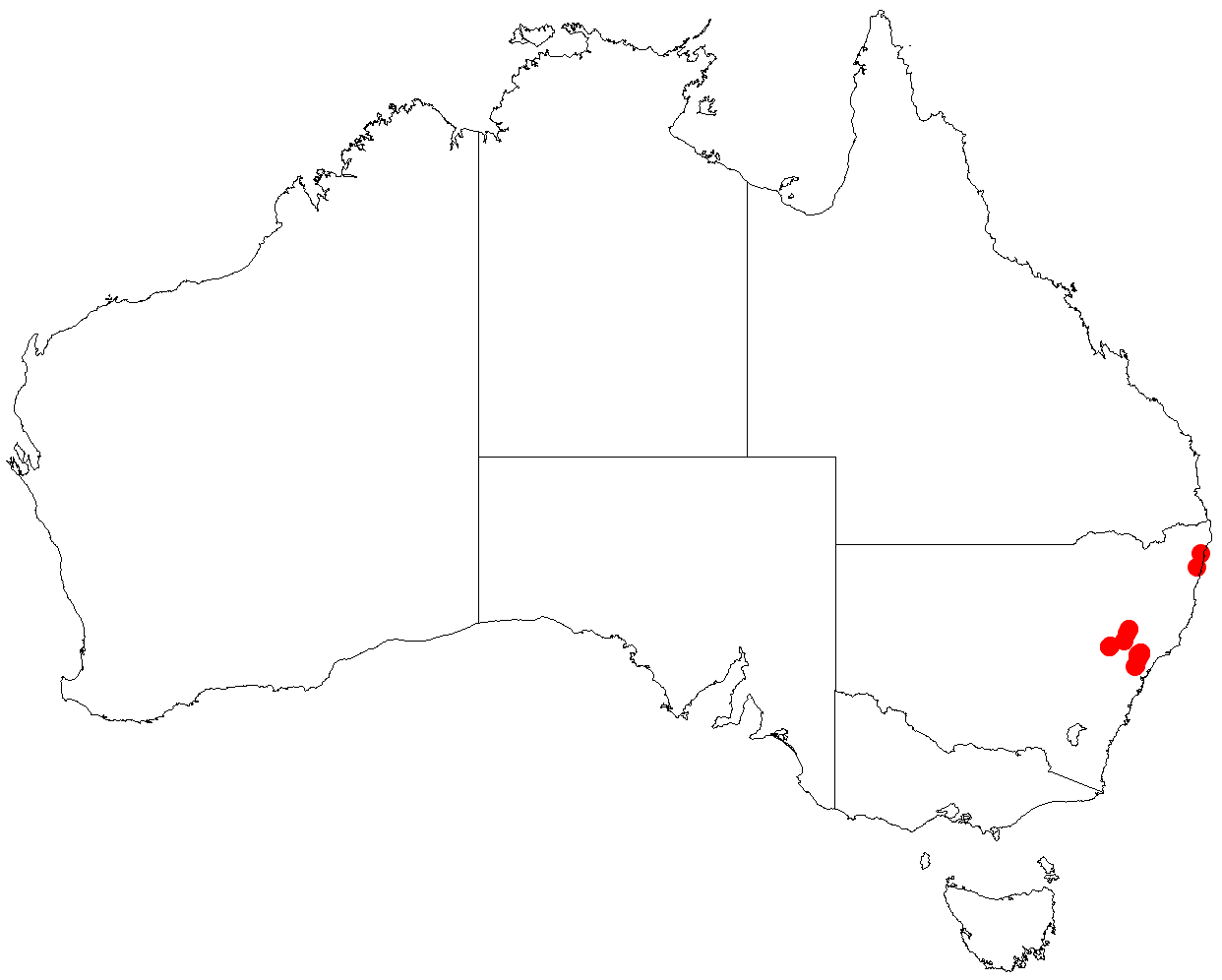
- Occurrence data from AVH

= Prostanthera cineolifera =

Singleton mint bush

Species of flowering plant

Prostanthera cineolifera, commonly known as the Singleton mint bush, is a species of flowering plant in the family Lamiaceae and is endemic to eastern New South Wales. It is an erect shrub with hairy branches, narrow egg-shaped leaves and clusters of pale mauve to dark purple-mauve flowers arranged on the ends of branchlets.

== Description ==
Prostanthera cineolifera is an erect, strongly aromatic shrub that typically grows to a height of 1–4 m (3 ft 3 in – 13 ft 1 in) with hairy, glandular stems. The leaves are narrow egg-shaped, light green, 12–50 mm (0.47–1.97 in) long and 4–12 mm (0.16–0.47 in) wide on a petiole 2–7 mm (0.079–0.276 in) long. The flowers are arranged in clusters at the ends of the branchlets with bracteoles 1–2 mm (0.039–0.079 in) long that fall off as the flowers develop. The sepals are 3–4 mm (0.12–0.16 in) long and form a tube 2–2.5 mm (0.079–0.098 in) long with two lobes, the upper lobe 1–2 mm (0.039–0.079 in) long. The petals are pale mauve to dark purple-mauve, 8–12 mm (0.31–0.47 in) long, and fused to form a tube that is darker on the inside. Flowering occurs from September to October.

== Taxonomy ==
Prostanthera cineolifera was first formally described in 1912 by Richard Thomas Baker and Henry George Smith in Journal and Proceedings of the Royal Society of New South Wales.

== Distribution and habitat ==
Singleton mint bush has been observed in scattered localities in New South Wales including at Apsley Falls near Walcha, and at scattered places in the Hunter Valley. It grows in forest and woodland on exposed ridges. A recent (2024) paper has revised these limits.

== Conservation status ==
This mintbush is classified as "vulnerable" under the Australian Government Environment Protection and Biodiversity Conservation Act and the New South Wales Government Biodiversity Conservation Act 2016. The main threats to the species include inappropriate fire regimes and its apparently small population size.

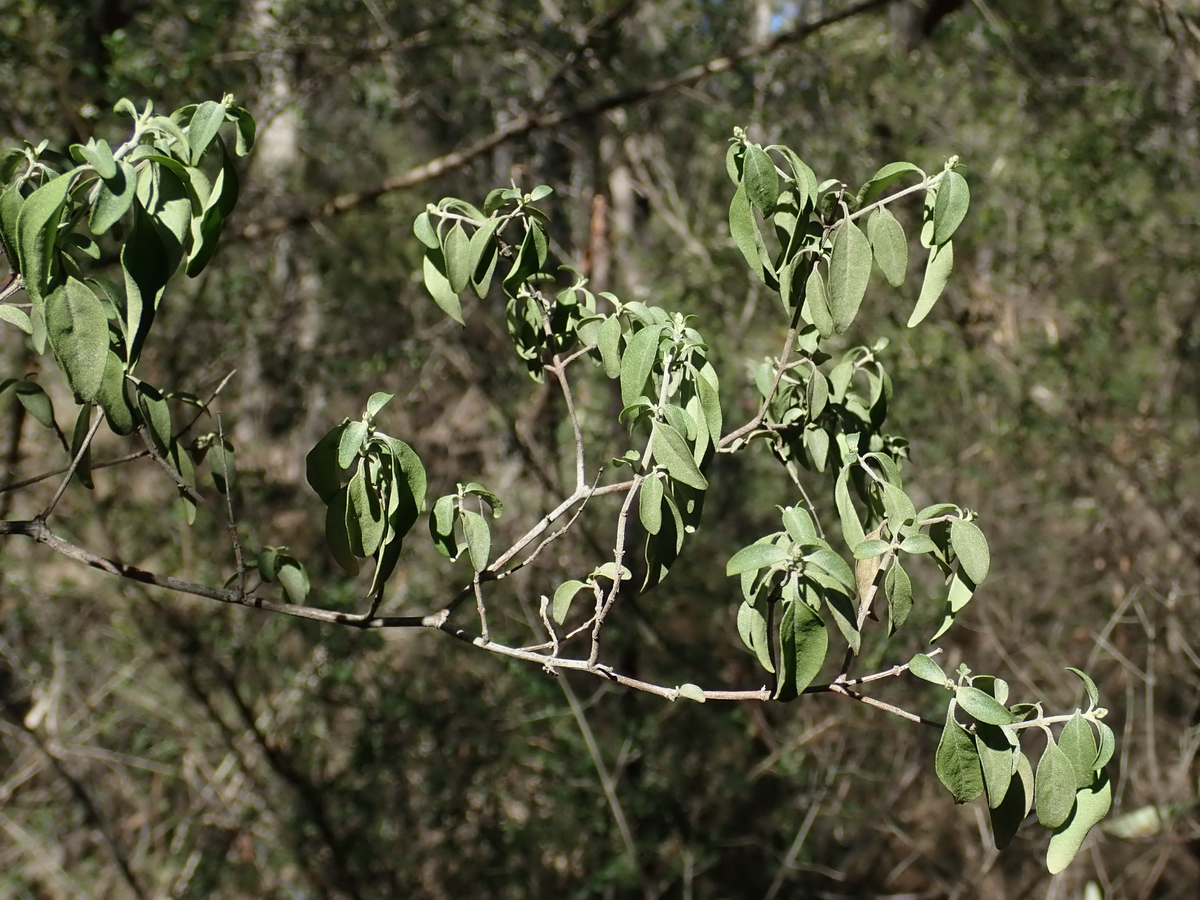
Broke, New South Wales

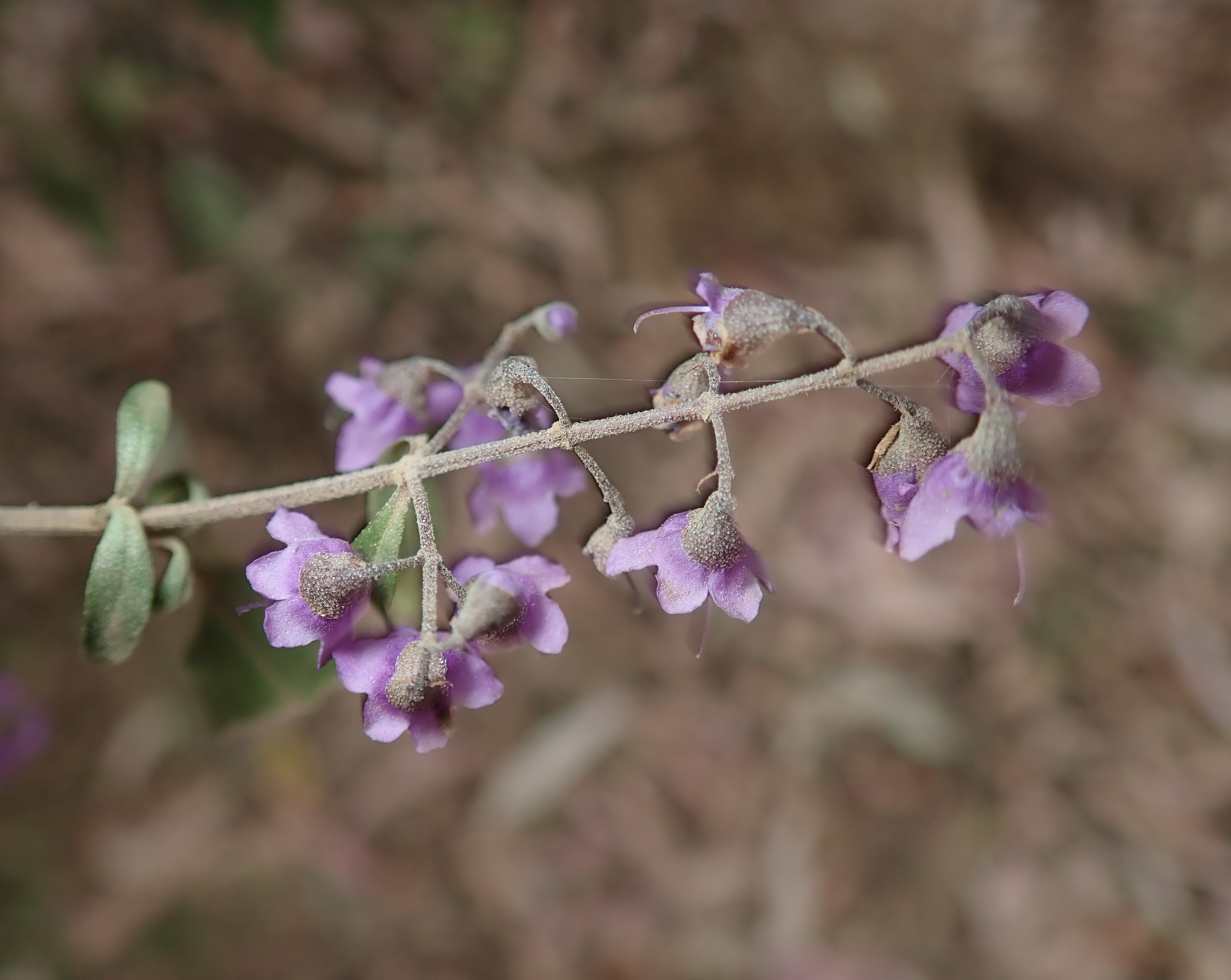
Sawpit Road

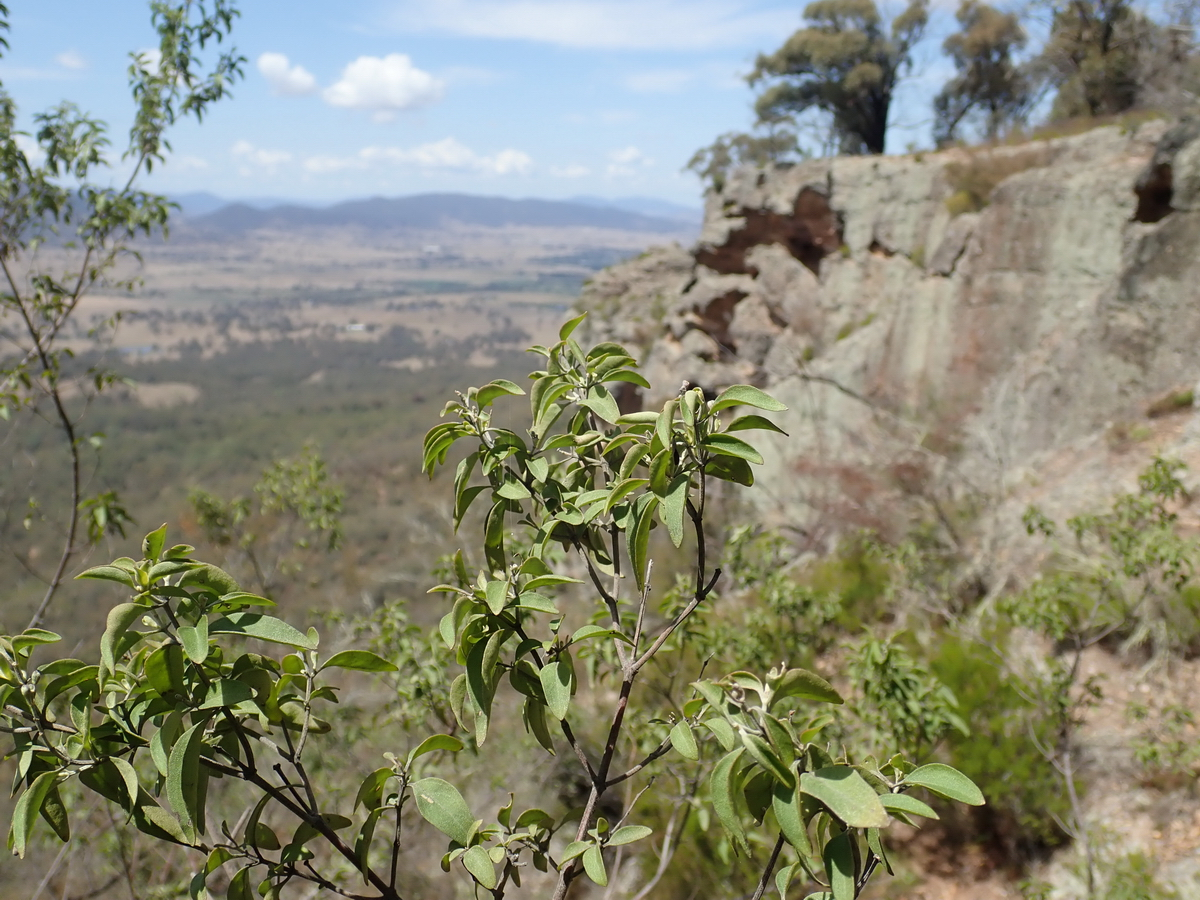
Wingen Maid

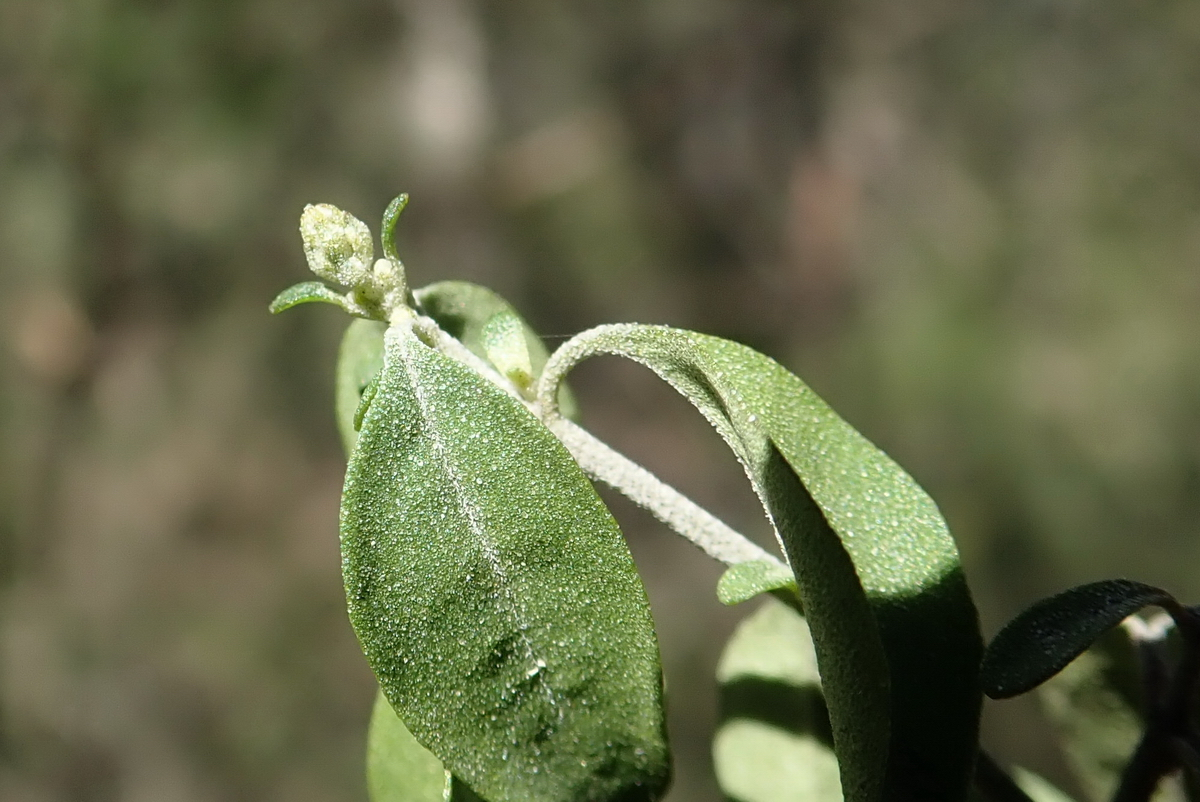
Broke, New South Wales
