= Liddell, New South Wales =

Liddell New South Wales
- Coordinates: 32°26′17″S 151°00′11″E
- Population: 0 (2016 census)
- Postcode(s): 2333
- Location: 29 km (18 mi) NW of Singleton
- LGA(s): Singleton Council
- State electorate(s): Upper Hunter
- Federal division(s): Hunter

Liddell is a locality in the Singleton Council of New South Wales, Australia. It had a population of zero as of the 2016 census.

Liddell Post Office opened on 16 January 1890 and closed on 30 April 1931.

The area is now the subject of coal mining operations by Liddell Coal. The Liddell Power Station is nearby, although it lies within the boundary of Muswellbrook.

== Heritage listings ==
Liddell has a number of heritage-listed sites, including:

- Old New England Highway: Chain of Ponds Inn
