= Singleton Post Office =

- Location within New South Wales Location within Australia
- 32.5606°S 151.1739°E
- Location: 25–27 George Street, Singleton, Singleton Council, New South Wales, Australia

New South Wales Heritage Register
- Official name: Post Office (former); Singleton Post Office
- Type: state heritage (built)
- Designated: 2 April 1999
- Reference no.: 478
- Type: Post Office
- Category: Postal and Telecommunications

Singleton Post Office is a heritage-listed former post office at 25–27 George Street, Singleton, Singleton Council, New South Wales, Australia. It was added to the New South Wales State Heritage Register on 2 April 1999.

== History ==
The original building was designed by Colonial Architect James Barnet and built in 1878 by W. Dart. The lobby was closed in to provide a telephone exchange in 1899. Barnet's successor, Walter Liberty Vernon, designed additions c. 1900s, including the extension of the roof to cover an added verandah and alterations to the east and west corners. The upper-level verandah was added in 1924.

The George Street post office closed in 1974 when the current John Street building opened. The Commonwealth Government sold the former post office c. 1986.

== Description ==
The former Singleton Post Office is a large two-storey building in the Victorian Italianate style with an arched colonnade and upper storey verandah at street face. It features rendered brickwork, a hipped slate roof and stone detailing in the footing, keystones and sills.

== Heritage listing ==
Singleton Post Office was listed on the New South Wales State Heritage Register on 2 April 1999.
