= Bulga, New South Wales =

Bulga New South Wales
- Coordinates: 32°39′30″S 151°01′00″E
- Population: 418 (SAL 2021)
- Postcode(s): 2330
- Elevation: 98 m (322 ft)
- Location: 22 km (14 mi) WSW of Singleton; 58 km (36 mi) W of Maitland; 90 km (56 mi) NW of Newcastle; 220 km (137 mi) N of Sydney
- LGA(s): Singleton Council
- State electorate(s): Cessnock; Upper Hunter
- Federal division(s): Hunter
Localities around Bulga:
Jerrys Plains	Warkworth	Warkworth
Milbrodale	Bulga	Mount Thorley
Milbrodale	Milbrodale	Fordwich

Bulga is a locality in the Singleton Council region of New South Wales, Australia. It had a population of 354 as of the 2016 census. The name is derived from an Aboriginal word for "mountain" or "isolated hill or mountain".

Bulga Public School operated from 1868 until December 1970.

Bulga Post Office opened as The Bulga on 1 August 1878, was renamed Bulga on 1 January 1894 and closed on 2 July 1993.

The village today contains the Regional Fire Service regional headquarters, National Parks and Wildlife Service offices, an Anglican church, a police station, scout hall in the former school building, recreation ground, service station and community hall. The community hall, originally a School of Arts, celebrated its 125th anniversary in October 2018. The Anglican church, St Mark's, holds a monthly service on the third Sunday of the month.

The village shares a local progress association with nearby Milbrodale.

== Mining impact ==
Bulga has been the subject of ongoing protests over several years from local residents around the impact of the expansion of the nearby Warkworth open-cut coal mine. The dispute has pitted angry local residents against business and mining interests, trade unions concerned about employment and the state government. Residents raised concern about the mine's expansion increasingly encroaching on the village, as well as concerns about road closures, 24 hour a day noise and constant coal dust.

Residents attempted to challenge the mine's expansion in court in 2016, but were forced to withdraw when the state government acted to remove their right of appeal. By that time, the state's Planning Assessment Commission had suggested that the township be entirely relocated, and voluntary acquisition of some affected houses was underway.

In December 2017, the Mount Thorley Warkworth Voluntary Planning Agreement was signed between council and new mine owners Yancoal, resulting in $6.6 million for a Bulga Community Project Fund to support the sustainability of Bulga and surrounds. In May 2018, Yancoal lodged an exploration license over additional land directly fronting onto the village outskirts. In August 2018, the mine won the approval of the Singleton Council to close the locally important Wallaby Scrub Road connecting Bulga to adjacent Warkworth, resulting in further community protest.

== Heritage listings ==
Bulga has a number of heritage-listed sites, including:

- 213 Main Road: Wollombi Brook bridge
