= Wollombi Brook bridge =

Wollombi Brook Bridge
- Coordinates: 32°39′04″S 151°01′16″E
- Carries: Putty Road
- Crosses: Wollombi Brook
- Locale: Bulga, New South Wales, Australia
- Other name: Bulga Bridge
- Owner: Transport for NSW

Characteristics
- Design: Dare truss
- Material: Timber
- Total length: 129 metres (424 ft)
- Width: 5.5 metres (18 ft)
- No. of spans: 5: 2 main; 3 approach

History
- Designer: Harvey Dare
- Constructed by: William Murphy and James Taylor
- Construction end: 1912

New South Wales Heritage Register
- Official name: Bulga Bridge over Wollombi Brook
- Type: State heritage (built)
- Designated: 20 June 2000
- Reference no.: 1459
- Type: Road Bridge
- Category: Transport - Land
- Builders: William Murphy and James Taylor

Location
- Interactive map of Wollombi Brook Bridge

The Wollombi Brook bridge is a heritage-listed road bridge that carries Putty Road across the Wollombi Brook at Bulga, New South Wales, Australia. The bridge was designed by Harvey Dare and built in 1912. The bridge is owned by Transport for NSW. The bridge was added to the New South Wales State Heritage Register on 20 June 2000.

== History ==
=== Timber truss bridges ===
Timber truss road bridges have played a significant role in the expansion and improvement of the New South Wales road network. Prior to the bridges being built, river crossings were often dangerous in times of rain, which caused bulk freight movement to be prohibitively expensive for most agricultural and mining produce. Only the high priced wool clip of the time was able to carry the costs and inconvenience imposed by the generally inadequate river crossings that often existed prior to the trusses construction.

Timber truss bridges were preferred by the NSW Public Works Department from the mid 19th to the early 20th century because they were relatively cheap to construct, and used mostly local materials. The financially troubled governments of the day applied pressure to the NSW Public Works Department to produce as much road and bridge work for as little cost as possible, using local materials. This condition effectively prohibited the use of iron and steel, as these, prior to the construction of the steel works at Newcastle in the early 20th century, had to be imported from England.

Harvey Dare, the designer of Dare truss and other bridges, was a leading engineer in the Public Works Department, and a prominent figure in early 20th century NSW.

Timber truss bridges, and timber bridges generally were so common that NSW was known to travellers as the "timber bridge state".

=== Wollombi Brook bridge ===
The bridge was built in 1911-12 by William Murphy and James Taylor over what was then known as Cockfighter Creek.

In 2003-04, emergency works were undertaken including pier replacement, driving of new piles and a second row of piles.

== Description ==
Bulga Bridge is a Dare-type timber truss road bridge. It has two timber truss spans, each of 32 metres (105 ft). There are three timber approach spans at one end and two at the other giving the bridge an overall length of 129 metres (424 ft). The super structure is supported by sheeted timber trestles and provides a carriageway with a minimum width of 5.5 metres (18 ft). A timber post and rail guard rail extends the full length of the bridge. The underside of the bridge deck has been strengthened with steel tension ties.

== Heritage listing ==
The Bulga Bridge is a Dare-type timber truss bridge, and was completed in 1912. In 1998 it was in good condition. As a timber truss road bridge, it has many associational links with important historical events, trends, and people, including the expansion of the road network and economic activity throughout NSW, and Harvey Dare, the designer of this type of truss. Dare trusses were fifth in the five stage design evolution of NSW timber truss road bridges. They were similar to Allan trusses, but contain improvements which make them stronger and easier to maintain. This engineering enhancement represents a significant evolution of the design of timber truss bridges, and gives Dare trusses some technical significance.

The Bulga Bridge is particularly technically significant because it has very large supporting trestles, has the rare feature of trussed cross girders, and is the largest span Dare truss bridge built. The bridge is located in the Hunter region, which has 15 historic bridges each constructed before 1905, and it gains heritage significance from its proximity to the high concentration of other historic bridges in the area. In 1998 there were 27 surviving Dare trusses in NSW of the 40 built, and 82 timber truss road bridges survive from the over 400 built. The Bulga Bridge is a representative example of Dare timber truss road bridges, and is assessed as being Nationally significant, primarily on the basis of its technical and historical significance.

The Bulga Bridge over Wollombi Brook was listed on the New South Wales State Heritage Register on 20 June 2000 having satisfied the following criteria.

The place is important in demonstrating the course, or pattern, of cultural or natural history in New South Wales.

Through the bridge's association with the expansion of the NSW road network, its ability to demonstrate historically important concepts such as the gradual acceptance of NSW people of American design ideas, and its association with Harvey Dare, it has historical significance.

The place is important in demonstrating aesthetic characteristics and/or a high degree of creative or technical achievement in New South Wales.

The bridge exhibits the technical excellence of its design, as all of the structural detail is clearly visible. In the context of its landscape it is visually attractive. As such, the bridge has moderate aesthetic significance.

The place has a strong or special association with a particular community or cultural group in New South Wales for social, cultural or spiritual reasons.

Timber truss bridges are prominent to road travellers, and NSW has in the past been referred to as the "timber truss bridge state". Through this, the complete set of bridges gain some social significance, as they could be said to be held in reasonable esteem by many travellers in NSW.

The place possesses uncommon, rare or endangered aspects of the cultural or natural history of New South Wales.

Highly rare - contains several important technical features.

The place is important in demonstrating the principal characteristics of a class of cultural or natural places/environments in New South Wales.

Representative of Dare timber truss bridges.

== See also ==
- List of bridges in Australia
