= Warkworth 30m Radio Telescope =

Radio telescope in Warkworth Radio Astronomical Observatory, New Zealand

Warkworth-2
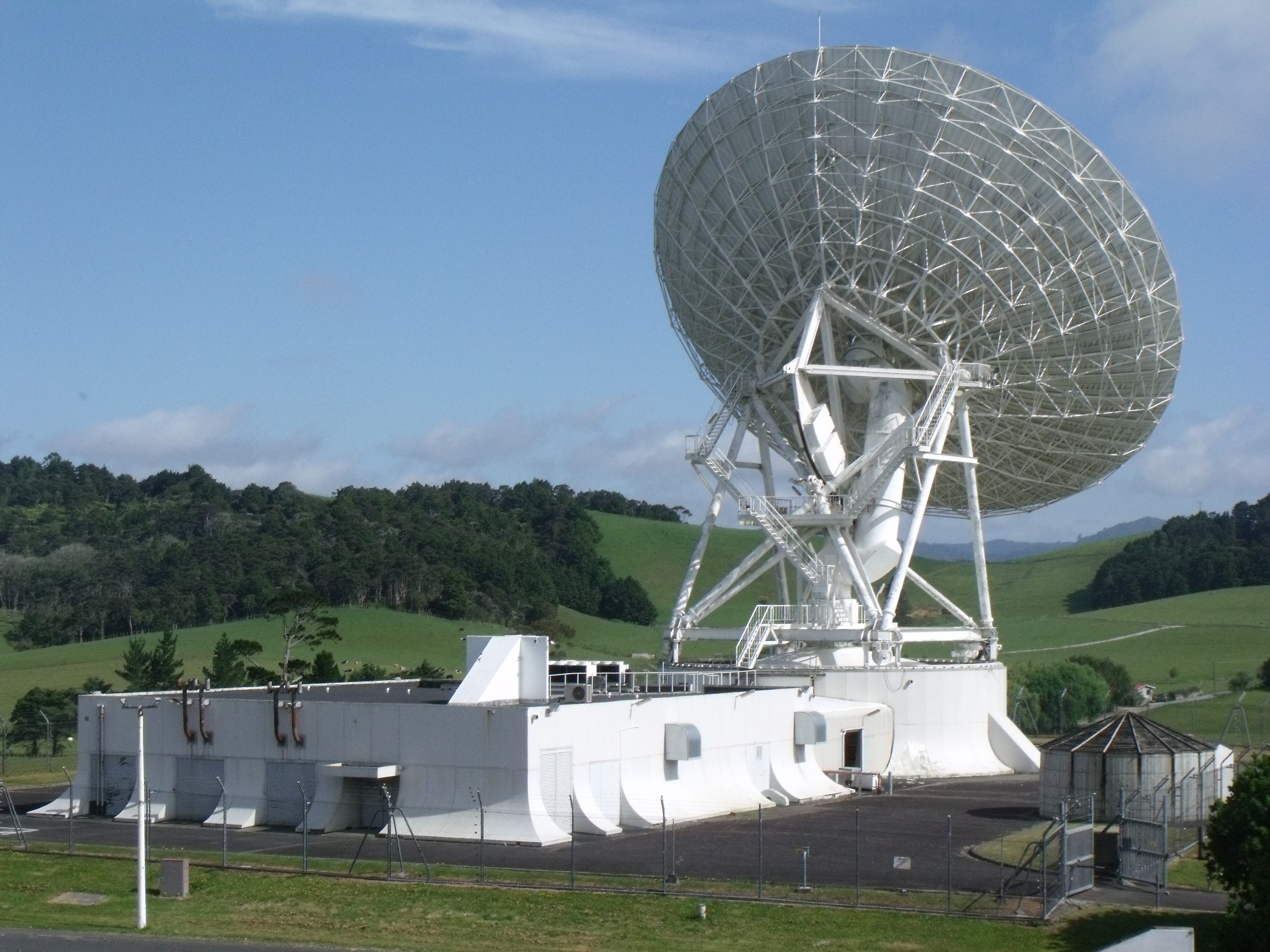
- Location(s): New Zealand
- Coordinates: 36°26′00″S 174°39′46″E
- Organization: Space Operations New Zealand Ltd
- Wavelength: C-Band, X-Band
- Built: 1983-84
- First light: 4 July 2015
- Diameter: 100 ft (30.5 m)
- Location of Warkworth-2
- Related media on Commons

The Warkworth 30m Radio Telescope is a radio telescope at the Spark Warkworth Station Site 2, located just south of Warkworth, New Zealand, about 50 km north of the Auckland CBD. It was operated by the Institute for Radio Astronomy and Space Research, Auckland University of Technology until 3 July 2023. It is now operated by SpaceOps NZ under licence from Spark. The antenna was commissioned in 1984 by New Zealand Post Office for international telecommunications via a geostationary satellite.

== Technical information ==
The telescope is a 30-metre Cassegrain wheel-and-track beam waveguide antenna. It was manufactured in 1983 by Nippon Electric Corp., and was first used by Telecom NZ for communication between New Zealand and the Pacific Islands.

== Gallery ==
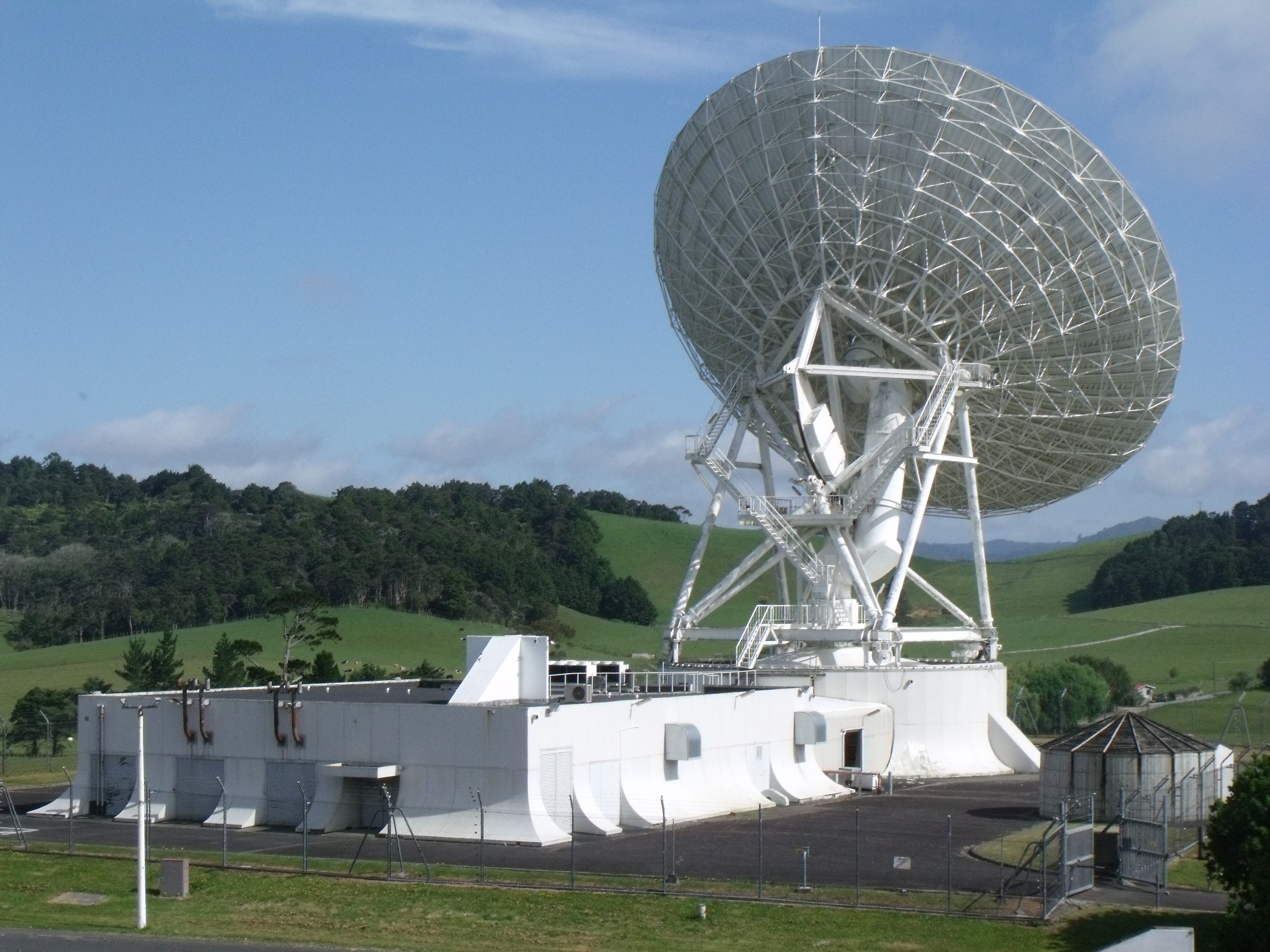
The telescope and associated buildings

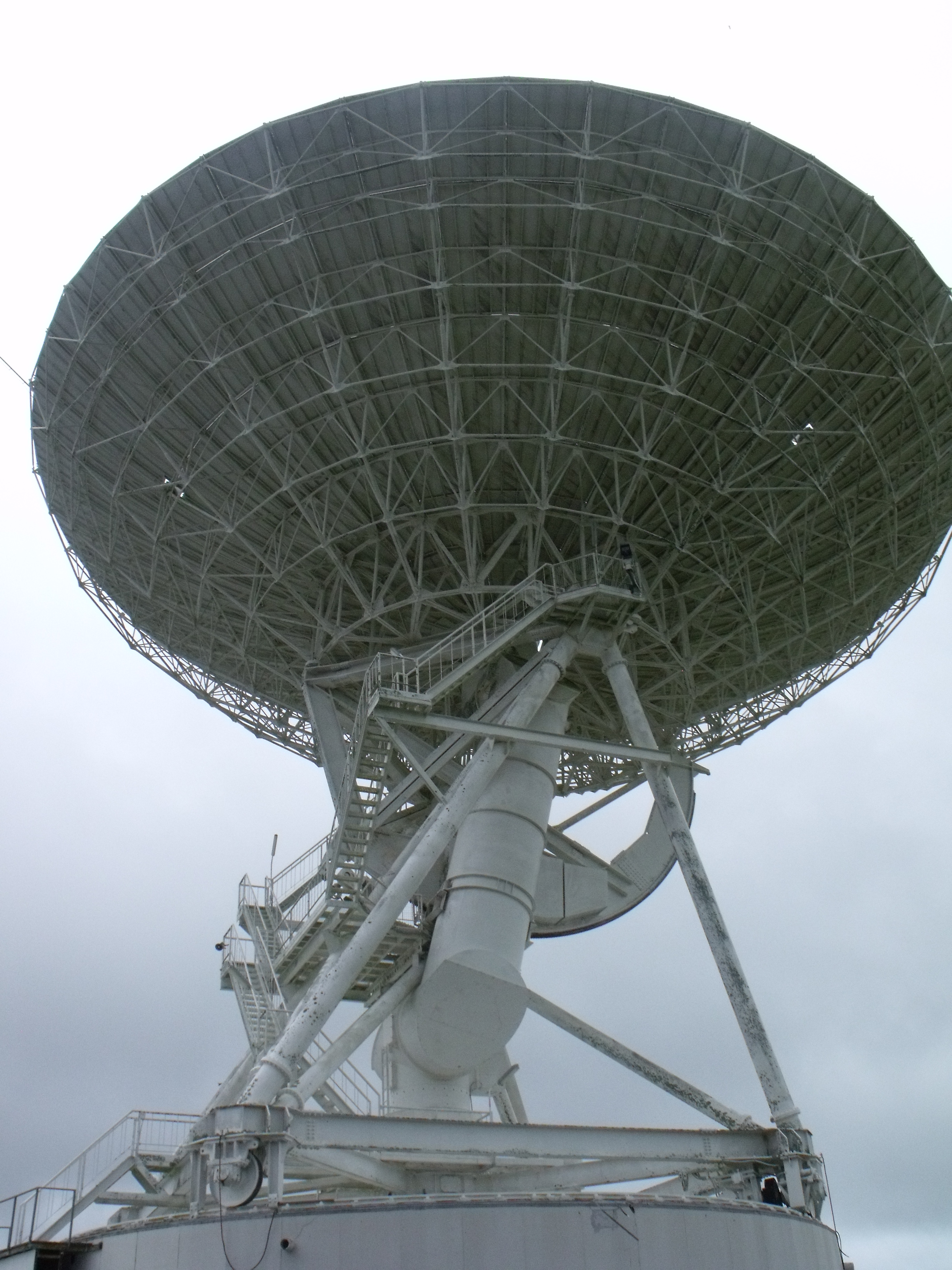
Closer view of the dish and track/wheel assembly

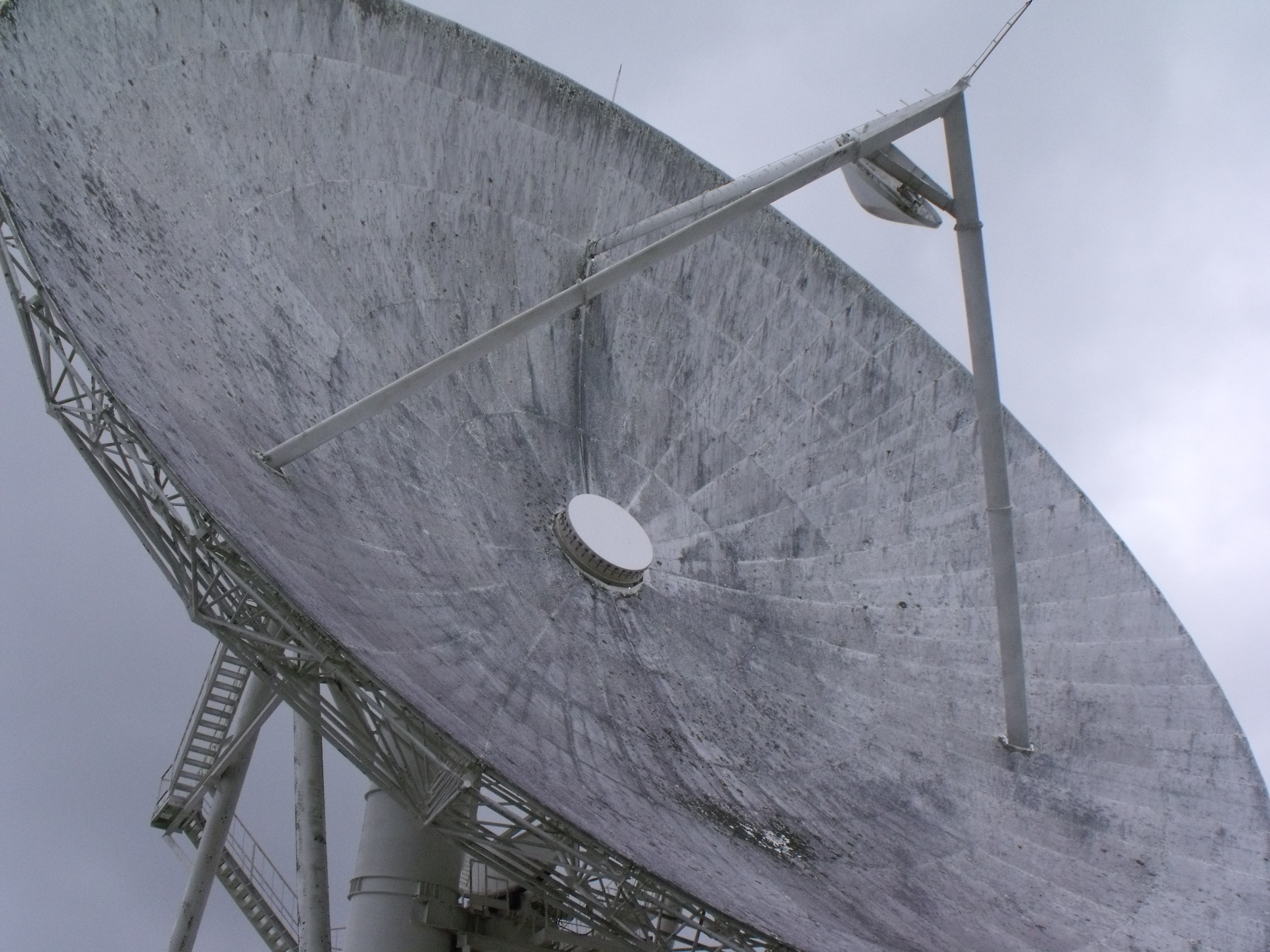
Close up of the dish and secondary reflector

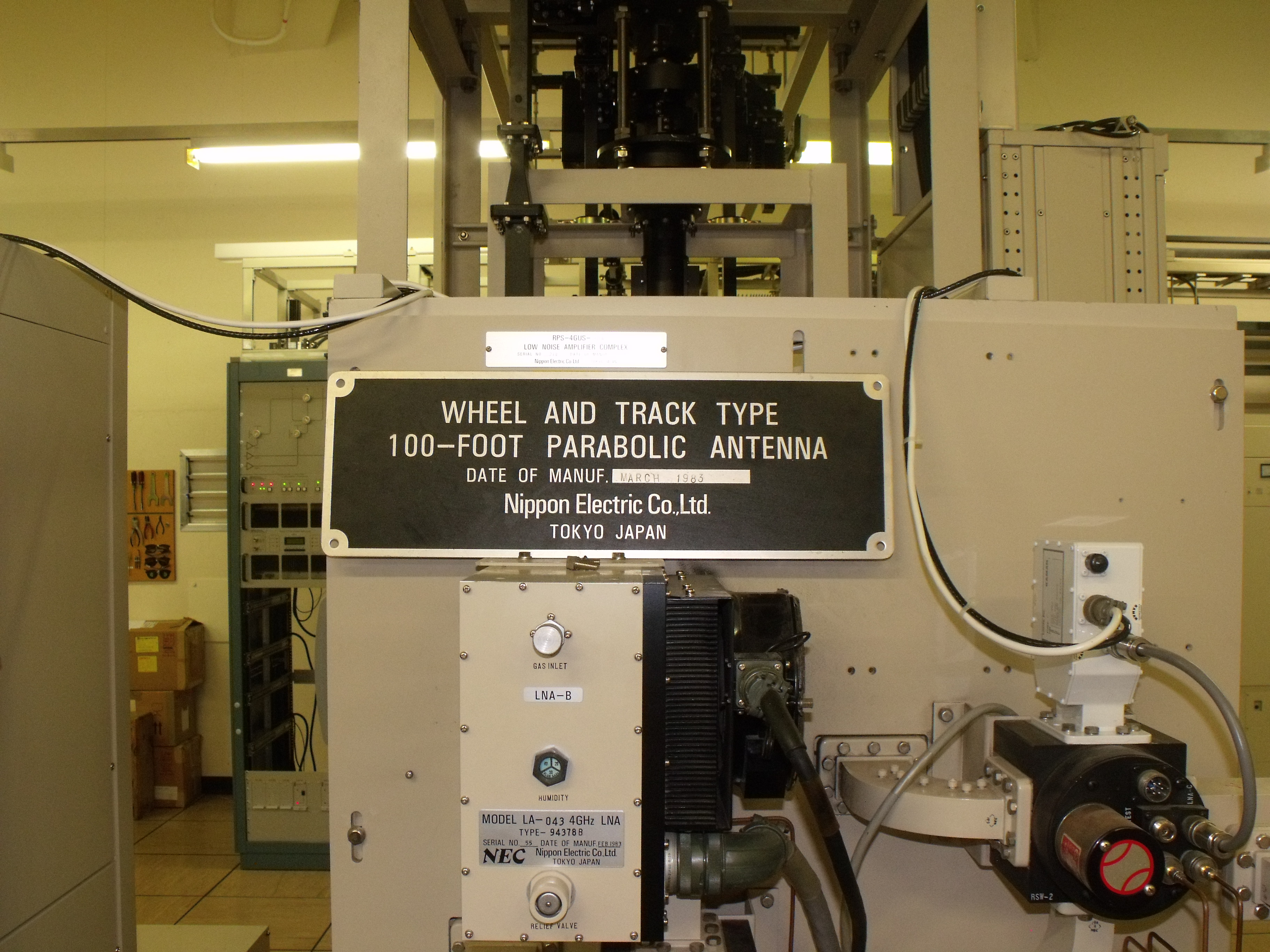
Manufacturers Plate

== See also ==
- Warkworth Radio Astronomical Observatory
- Warkworth 12m Radio Telescope
- Radio astronomy
- Radio telescope
- List of radio telescopes
