= Warkworth Radio Telescope =

Radio telescope in Warkworth Radio Astronomical Observatory, New Zealand

Warkworth 12m Radio Telescope
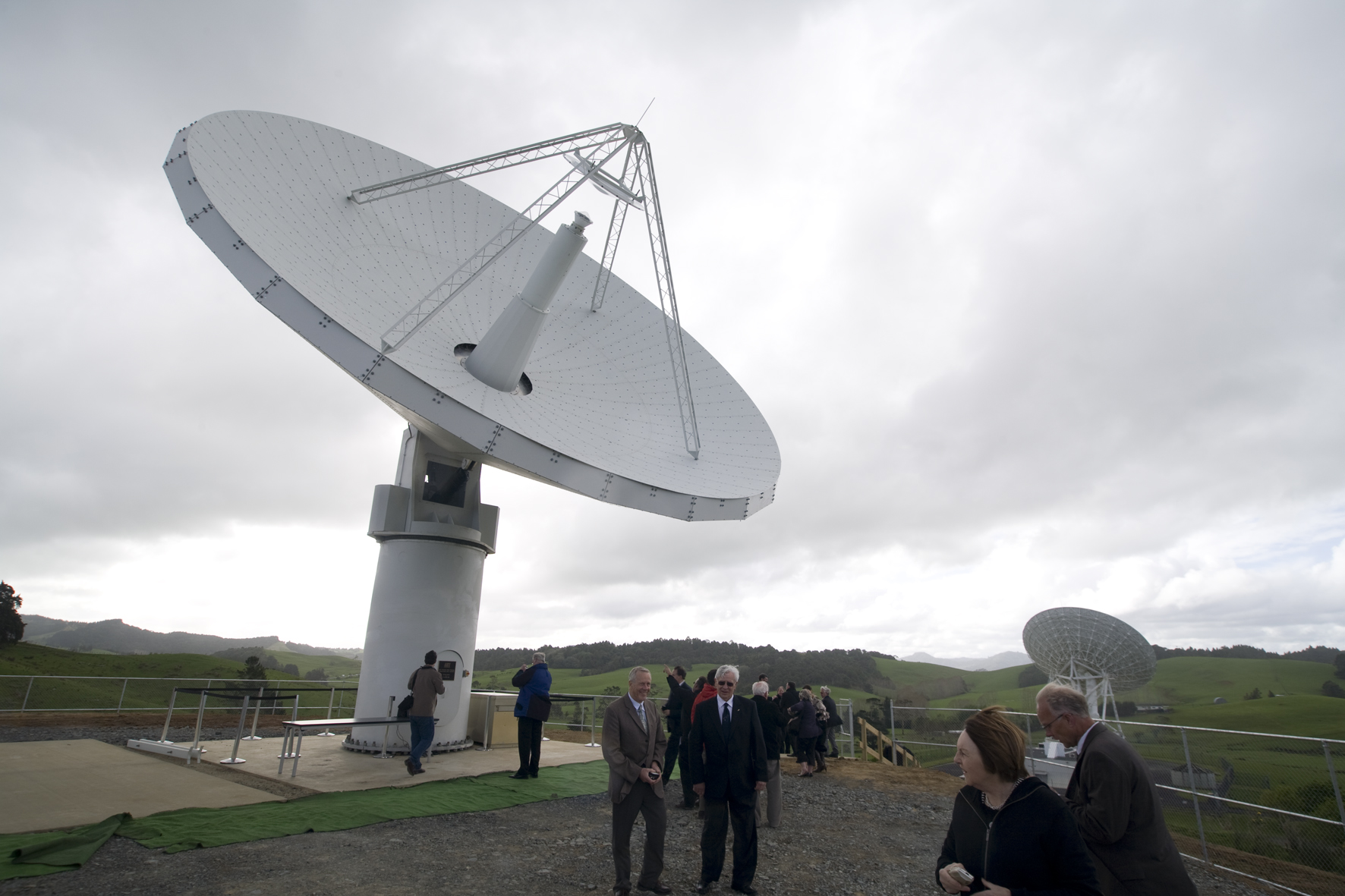
- Location(s): Auckland Region, New Zealand
- Coordinates: 36°25′59″S 174°39′45″E
- Diameter: 12.1 m (39 ft 8 in)
- Secondary diameter: 1.8 m (5 ft 11 in)
- Location of Warkworth Radio Telescope
- Related media on Commons

The Warkworth 12m Radio Telescope is a radio telescope at the Warkworth Radio Astronomical Observatory, located just south of Warkworth, New Zealand, about 50 km north of the Auckland CBD. It is operated by the Institute of Radio Astronomy and Space Research of Auckland University of Technology and was constructed in 2008.

== Technical information ==
The 12m diameter antenna was designed and constructed by COBHAM Satcom.

The antenna is a fully steerable dual shaped Cassegrain with a main dish diameter of 12.1m and a secondary reflector diameter of 1.8m. The focal Length is 4.538m. The surface precision is 0.35mm (RMS) and the pointing accuracy is 18 inches. It operates in the L-Band, S-Band and X-Band with dual polarisation S and X-band feeds from COBHAM with room temperature receivers. The receiver systems cover 2.2 to 2.4 GHz at S-band and 8.1 to 9.1 GHz at X-band.

It is mounted alt-azimuth and has slewing rates of 5 deg/s in azimuth and 1.25 deg/s in elevation, and acceleration of 1.3 deg/s/s.

== Research activity ==
In 2010 this dish was used for several very-long-baseline interferometry(VLBI) observations in conjunction with the Australian Long Baseline Array.

From 2011 it was a part of the International VLBI Service for Geodesy and Astrometry. It is also co-located with a Land Information New Zealand and GNS Science 'PositioNZ' Global Navigation Satellite System station, to assist in maintaining the International Terrestrial Reference Frame.

== See also ==
- Warkworth Radio Astronomical Observatory
- Warkworth 30m Radio Telescope
- Radio astronomy
- Radio telescope
- List of radio telescopes
