= Warkworth Radio Astronomical Observatory =

Warkworth Radio Observatory
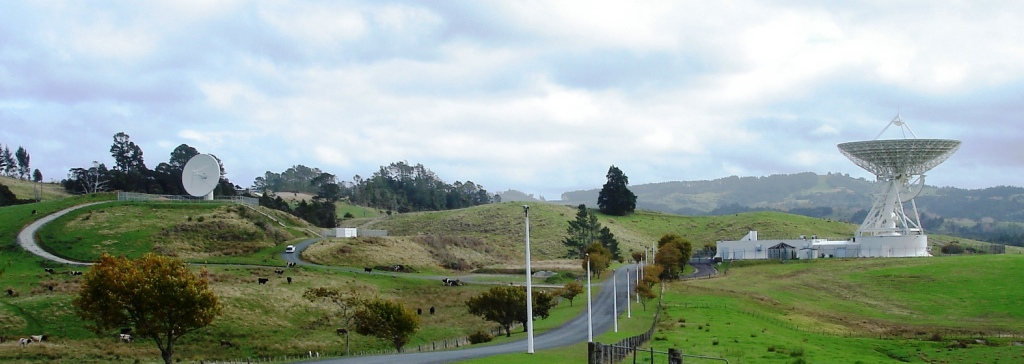
- Location: Warkworth, Auckland Region, New Zealand
- Coordinates: 36°25′58″S 174°40′06″E
- Website: www.irasr.aut.ac.nz
- Telescopes: Warkworth 30m Radio Telescope; Warkworth Radio Telescope
- Location of Warkworth Radio Astronomical Observatory
- Related media on Commons

The Warkworth Radio Astronomical Observatory is a radio telescope observatory, located just south of Warkworth, New Zealand, about 50 km north of the Auckland CBD. It was established by the Institute for Radio Astronomy and Space Research, Auckland University of Technology. The WARK12M 12m Radio Telescope was constructed in 2008. In 2010, a licence to operate the Telecom New Zealand 30m dish was granted, which led to the commissioning of the WARK30M 30m Radio Telescope. The first observations made in conjunction with the Australian Long Baseline Array took place in 2011.

The observatory was purchased by Space Operations New Zealand Limited (SpaceOps NZ) in July 2023 after the university decided to close the facility. Because of its wider ambit, the facility is now called the Warkworth Space Centre.

== History ==
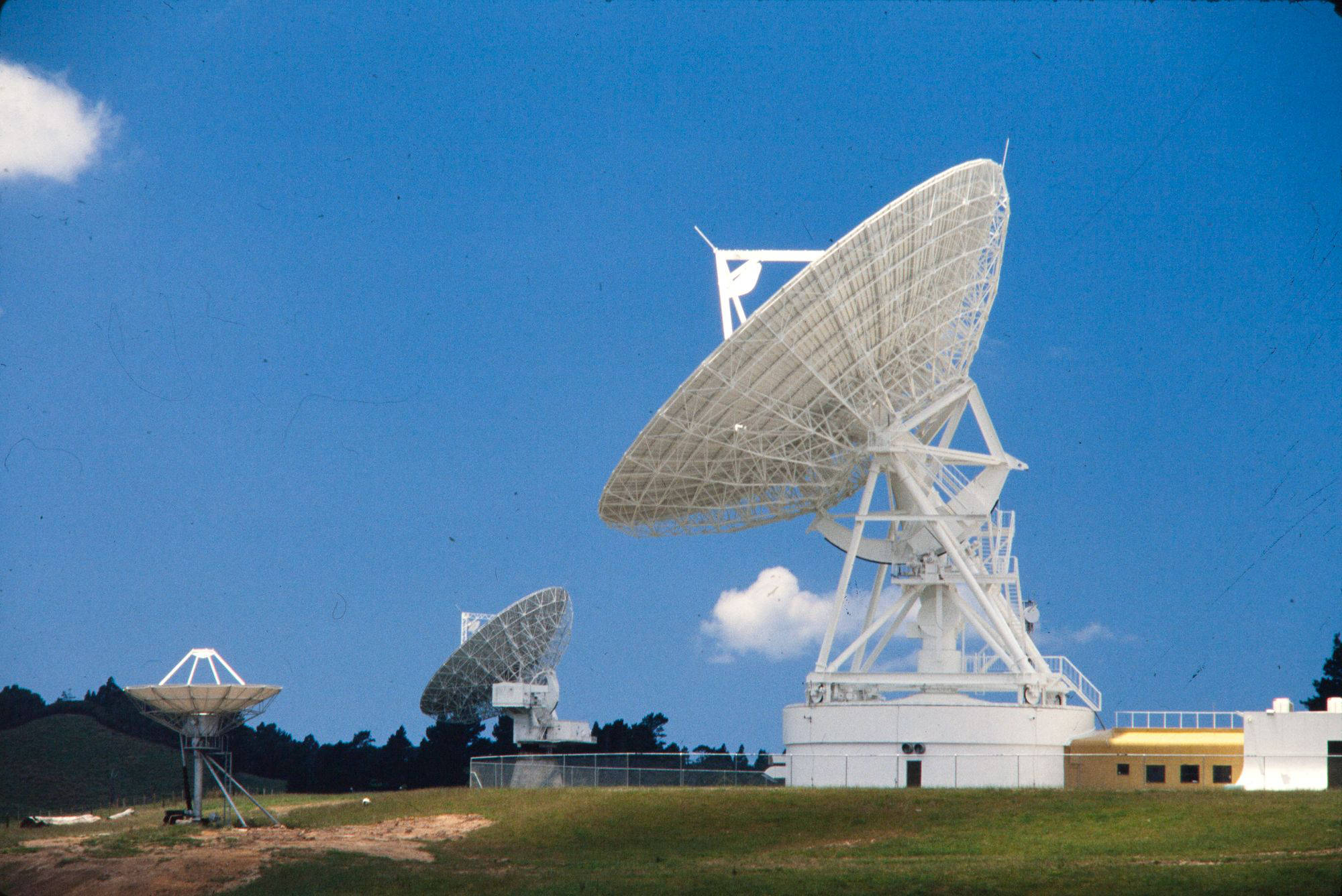
The Warkworth Radio Astronomical Observatory in the latter 1980s

The Warkworth Space Centre is on land that was first developed for long-range telecommunications, operated by the New Zealand Post Office and opening on 17 July 1971. The station, primarily connecting to fourth generation Intelsat satellites, was used for satellite telephone circuits and television, including the broadcast of the 1974 British Commonwealth Games, held in Christchurch. The shallow valley site was chosen as it was sheltered from winds and radio noise, and the horizon elevation of only 5° allowed the station to be useful for transmissions to low orbit satellites. The original 30-metre antenna was decommissioned on 18 June 2008 and demolished.

A second antenna and station building were opened on 24 July 1984. This was removed from commercial service in November 2010, after which the Auckland University of Technology upgraded the motor drives and began using it for radio astronomy.

== Technical information ==
A hydrogen maser is installed on-site to provide the very accurate timing required by VLBI observations. The observatory has a 10 Gbit/s connection to the REANNZ network, providing high speed data transfers for files and e-VLBI as well as linking the site to the global national research and education network architecture.

== See also ==
- Radio astronomy
- List of radio telescopes
