= Broke, New South Wales =

Broke
- Town
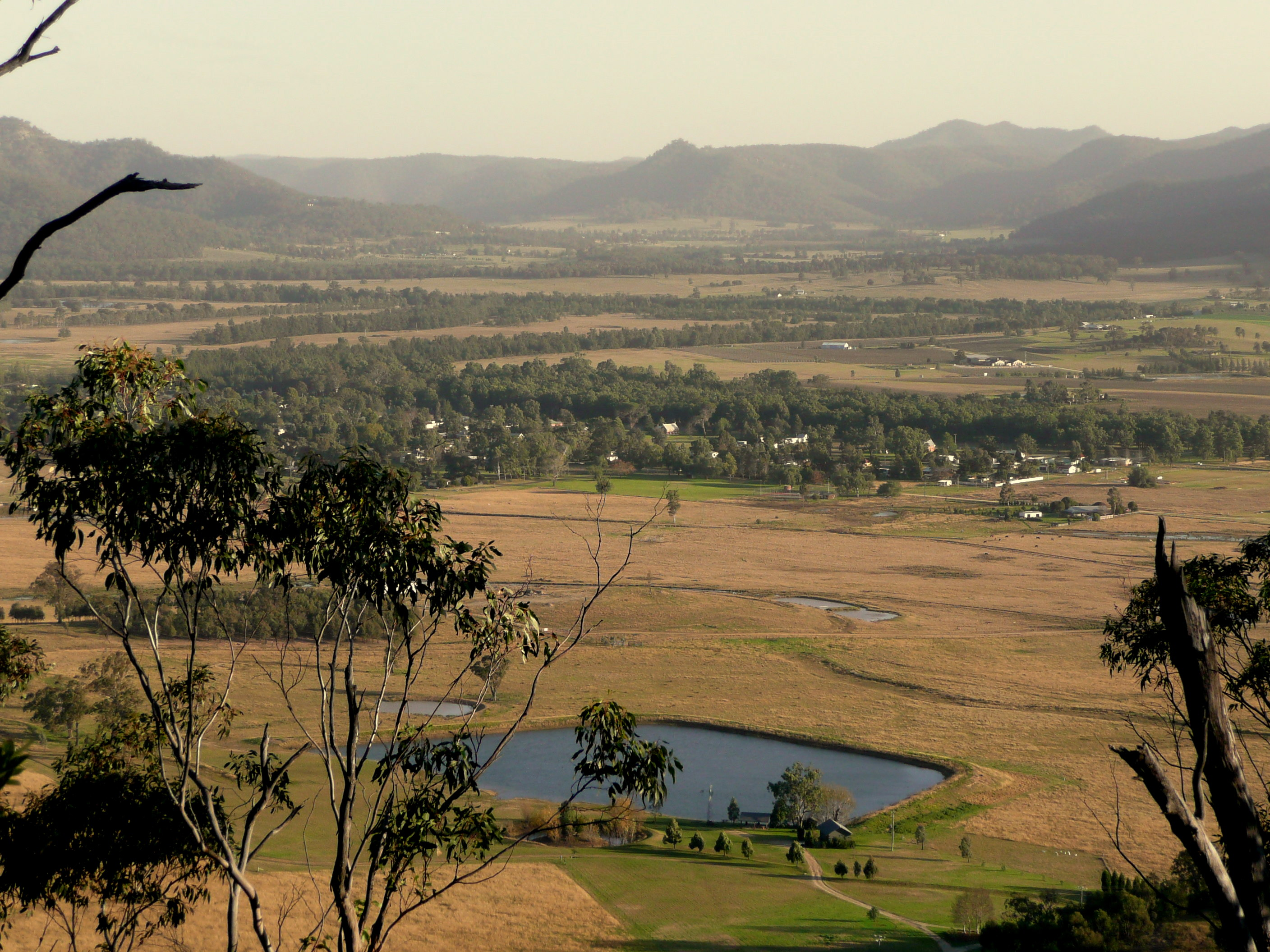
- View of Broke from nearby hills

- Coordinates: 32°44′54″S 151°06′04″E
- Country: Australia
- State: New South Wales
- Region: Hunter
- LGA: Singleton Council
- Location: 157 km (98 mi) NNW of Sydney; 24 km (15 mi) S of Singleton

Government
  - State electorate: Cessnock
  - Federal division: Hunter

Population
  - Total: 557 (2021 census)
- Time zone: UTC+10 (AEST)
  - Summer (DST): UTC+11 (AEDT)
- Postcode: 2330
- County: Northumberland
- Parish: Harrowby

Broke is a village of approximately 557 people in the Hunter Region of New South Wales, Australia in Singleton Shire. It is located 157 kilometres (98 mi) to the north of Sydney on the original early colonial road from Sydney to Singleton (24 kilometres (15 mi) north).

== Description ==
The Broke area is well known for its boutique wine production and is usually referred to as the 'Broke-Fordwich' wine region (a sub-region of the Australian Geographical Indication (GI) Hunter Valley zone). There is also substantial open-cut and underground coal mining in the area between Broke and Singleton. The village also holds an annual fair in September.

Broke contains a primary school, a Catholic church, an Anglican church and a service station with store and post office. The brick house on the south side of the store is the former police station and lock-up. The south side of Broke provides views across properties to the Broken Back Range, the most conspicuous feature of which is the sandstone formation known as Yellow Rock.

== History ==
Explorers first reached the Broke area in 1818 and land grants followed in 1824. John Blaxland received a grant because he had found a route to the Hunter Valley, while grants also went to George Blaxland and Robert Rodd. The village was given its name by Major Thomas Mitchell, the Surveyor General, who used the name of his English friend Sir Charles Broke-Vere.

John Blaxland had built a mill at the nearby Fordwich by 1860. Six years later, Broke had an Anglican church, a farm implements workshop and a school. The Great North Road was completed and became the main stock route to Sydney; since it passed through Broke, it contributed to further growth of the village, with something like a thousand head of cattle using the route each week. This amount of activity meant that by the late 1800s Broke had several hotels, a post office, a school, a mill, two churches, a hall, a brick kiln, a butchery, bakery and blacksmith.

However, it was not to last. The railways eventually replaced the Great North Road as the main route between Sydney and the Hunter, which meant a drastic drop in traffic through Broke. A railway service between Wollombi and Singleton was proposed but never constructed. Broke reverted to being the quiet village it had originally been. However, a number of significant buildings have survived from the early days. They include the original post office (1882), the village hall (1898), public school (1876), Anglican church and Catholic church, the old police station and the remains of the Blaxland Homestead on Broke Road.

=== Modern economy and tourism ===
In the 21st century, the local economy of Broke has transitioned toward niche tourism and artisanal production, complementing its established viticulture and mining industries. Following the significant flooding of the Wollombi Brook in July 2022, which caused widespread damage to local infrastructure, the village underwent a period of community-led economic recovery. This led to a shift toward independent tourism initiatives that promote the "tranquil side of the Hunter" as an alternative to the larger commercial hubs of Pokolbin. The region has diversified into products such as olive groves and a meadery, as well as the integration of modular "tiny house" accommodations to support regional tourism growth.

== Population ==
In the 2021 Census, there were 557 people in the Broke suburb. 83.2% of people were born in Australia and 87.7% of people spoke only English at home.

== Baiame cave ==
Approximately 12 kilometres (7 mi) north-west of Broke is an 80-hectare (198-acre) site containing rock shelters with several Aboriginal paintings, which are thought to depict Baiame, the Sky Father who created the world through his dreaming. The site, which is on private property, is popularly known as Baiame Cave and is on the Register of the National Estate.

== Gallery ==
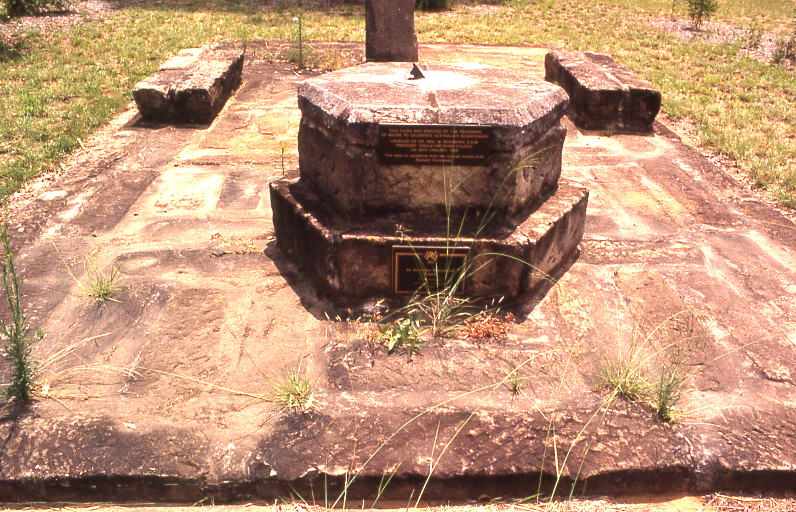
Ruins of Blaxland Homestead, Broke Road

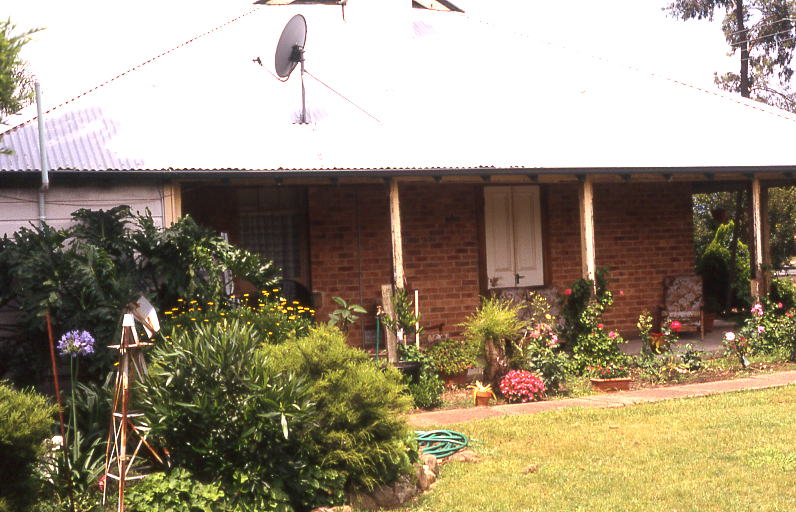
Former police station, Broke Road

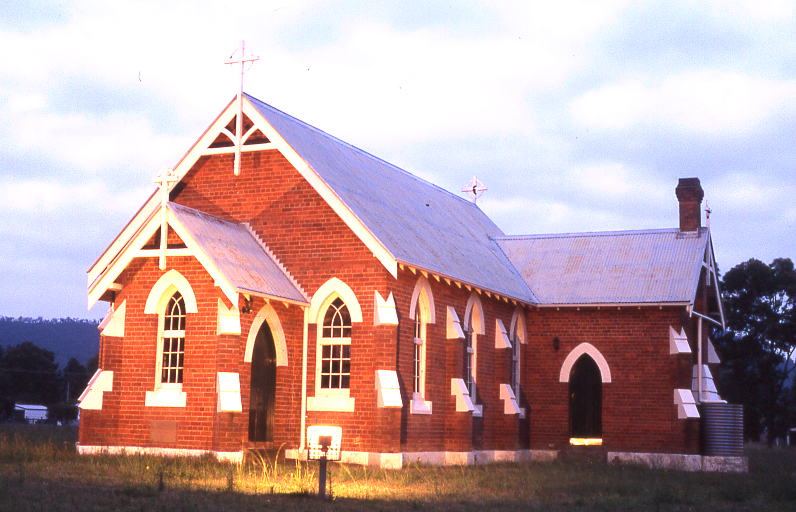
Catholic Church, Broke Road

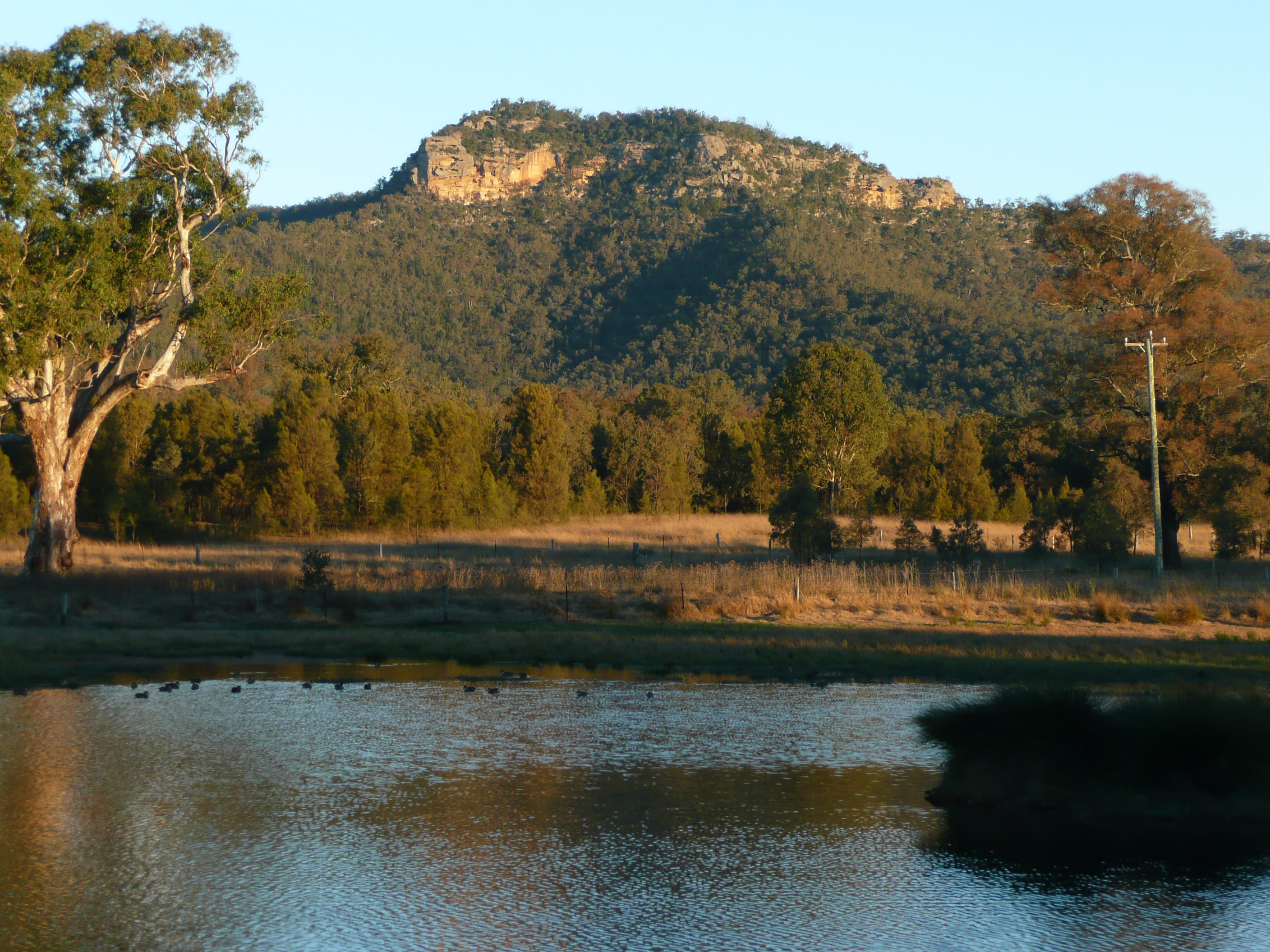
Yellow Rock
