= Singleton, New South Wales =

Singleton
- Town
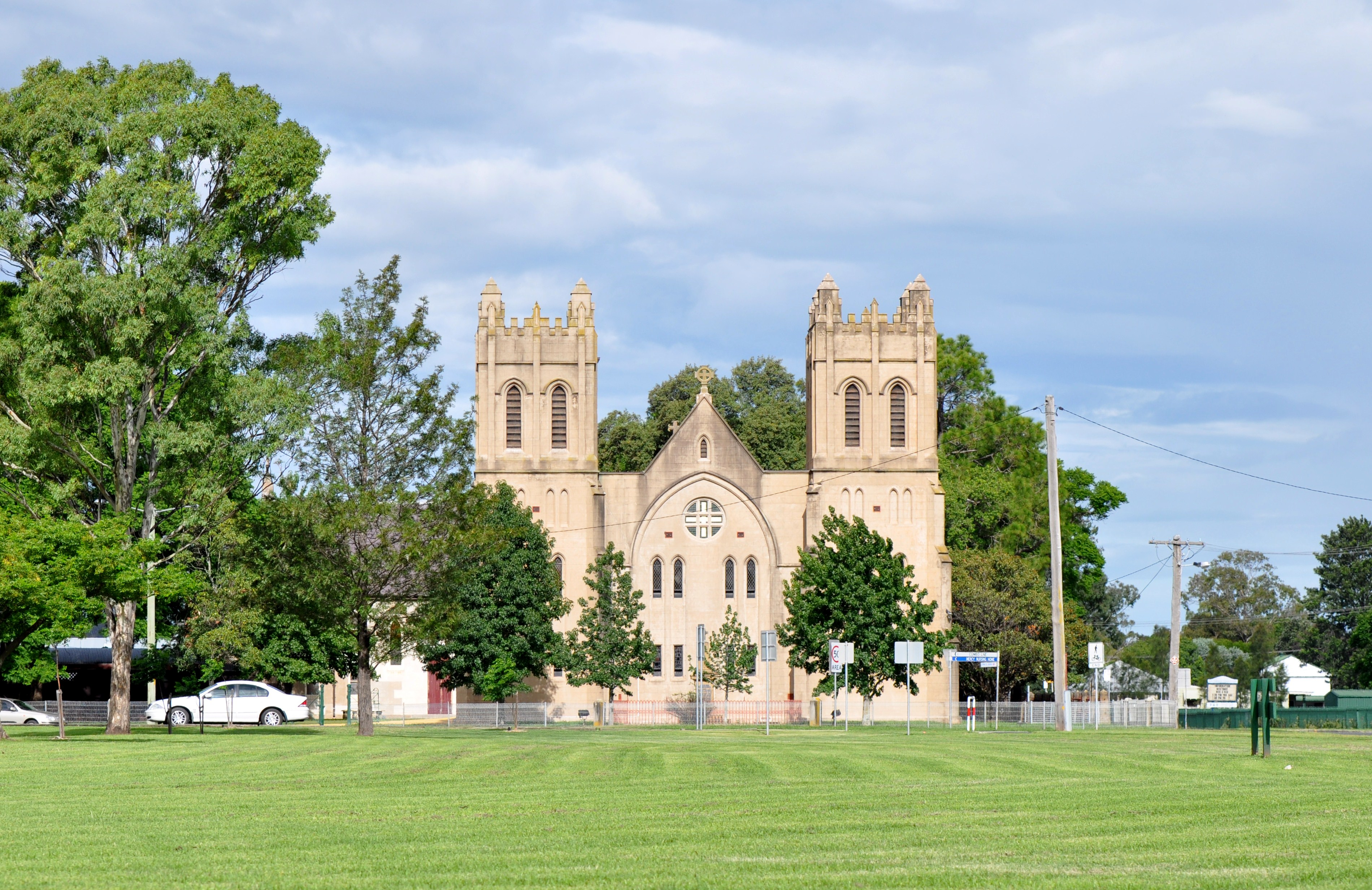
- St Patrick's Church

- Coordinates: 32°34′0″S 151°10′11″E
- Country: Australia
- State: New South Wales
- LGA: Singleton Shire Council
- Location: 202 km (126 mi) NNW of Sydney; 80 km (50 mi) NW of Newcastle; 47 km (29 mi) SE of Muswellbrook; 44 km (27 mi) NW of Cessnock; 49 km (30 mi) WNW of Maitland

Government
  - State electorate: Upper Hunter
  - Federal division: Hunter
- Elevation: 40 m (130 ft)

Population
  - Total: 17,503 (2023)
- Postcode: 2330
- County: Northumberland
- Mean max temp: 24.7 °C (76.5 °F)
- Mean min temp: 11.1 °C (52.0 °F)
- Annual rainfall: 645.4 mm (25.41 in)

Singleton is a town on the banks of the Hunter River in New South Wales, Australia. Singleton is 202km (126 mi) north-north-west of Sydney, and 70 km (43 mi) north-west of Newcastle. As of 2023, Singleton had an estimated urban population of 17,503.

Singleton's main urban area includes the town centre, Singleton Heights, Dunolly, Darlington, The Retreat, Wattle Ponds and Hunterview. Surrounding rural villages include Broke, Camberwell, Jerrys Plains, Goorangoola/Greenlands, Belford and Lower Belford.

Singleton is located on the north-eastern part of the geological structure known as the Sydney basin, which borders the New England region.

Singleton is now home to a $100 million dollar lottery winner, the highest in the town’s history.

== History ==
The traditional landowners of the land around what is now Singleton are the Wonnarua / Wanaruah people. The Wonnarua / Wanaruah people have occupied the land in the Upper Hunter Valley for over 30,000 years.

Singleton was established in the 1820s. In its early years, it was also called Patrick's Plains. The Main Northern railway line reached Singleton in 1863 and was the end of the line until 1869. The town retains many historic buildings, including the original courthouse built in 1841, various large churches and many traditional Australian pubs. The countryside surrounding Singleton contains an unusual number of fine old mansions, reflecting the aristocratic nature of land grants when the area was settled. They include 'Neotsfield' (1828), the elaborate 'Baroona' (1829), 'Abbey Green' (1865) and stunning 'Minimbah' (1877).

A Telegraph Office was opened in Singleton on 25 February 1861 during the construction of the first telegraph line to Queensland. That Office combined with the Post Office on 1 January 1870. In May 1942, the community celebrated the appointment of the town's first female Telegram Messenger – Miss Daphne Lambkins. She was one of the first female Messengers in the Commonwealth.

Singleton was subject to the major flooding of the Hunter River in 1955, causing extensive damage to the town. When the area was being settled, the government originally attempted to create a town at Whittingham in a flood-free area, but the town grew by the river nonetheless. An embankment was constructed following the 1955 floods to help protect the town against any future flooding.

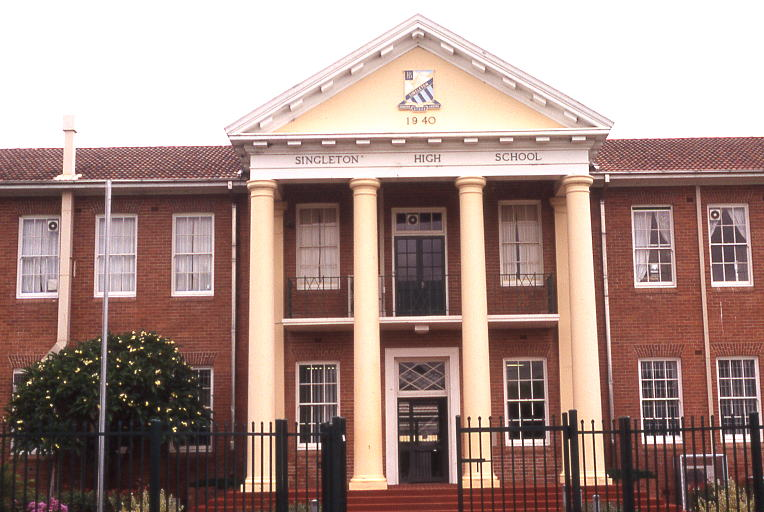
Singleton High School

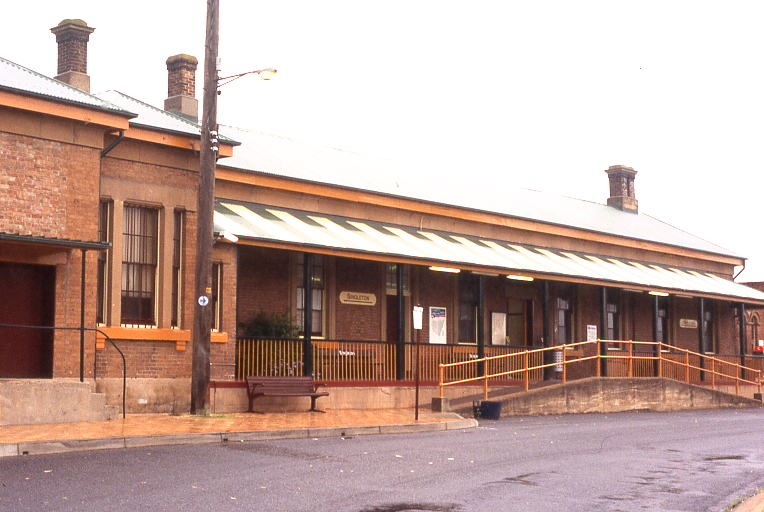
Singleton railway station

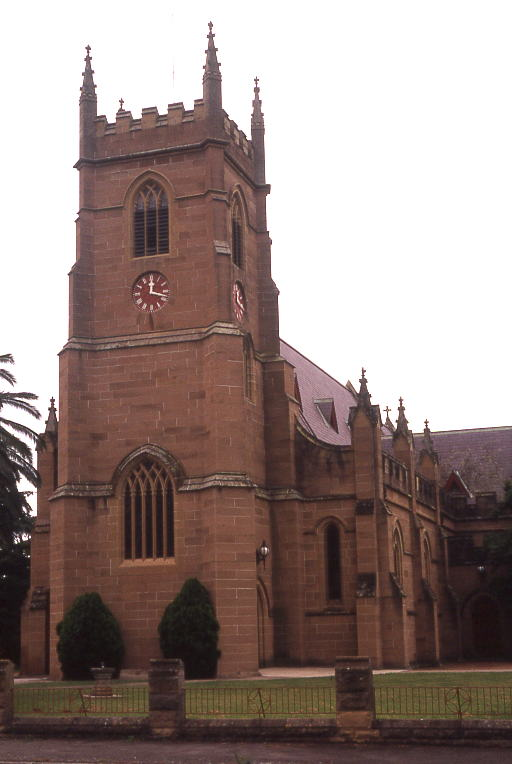
All Saints' Anglican Church

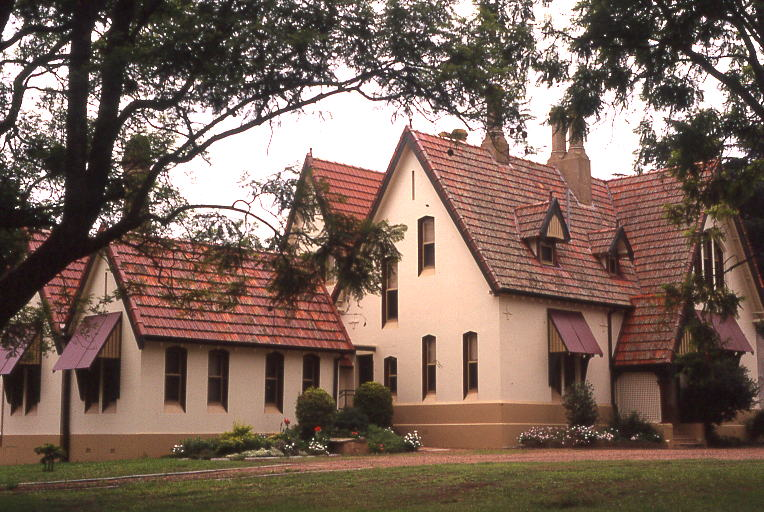
All Saints' Church Rectory

=== 1833 Revolt ===
In November 1833, six convicts decided to revolt because of their poor treatment, meagre provisions and floggings. Larnach and Mudie were away from the property at the time washing sheep. The rebels stole clothes, guns, food and horses. They held Emily Larnach hostage with several servants locking them in an outhouse. They also attempted to kill John Larnach but he managed to escape to Henry Dangar's house. Five of six men involved the riots were sentenced to death.During the months preceding the revolt nearly two thirds of the convicts had been flogged with one third of them being flogged multiple times. The subsequent trial in December 1833 led to the convicts being charged with stealing from two dwelling houses, shooting with intent to kill, aiding and abetting and an attempted murder. The inquiry produced little evidence of illegal work practice or servants and convicts being overworked.

== Notable properties ==
=== Baroona ===
Baroona was built in 1829 with property being on 33 hectares. John Larnach built the 1600ha house on land owned by his father-in-law James Mudie. Larnach and Mudie worked together on property with the help of convict labour to create a prominent agricultural establishment producing wool, meat and wheat. He was assigned 64 convicts which comprised 67% English, 25% Irish and a few from Scotland with a median age of 28 years old. A servant set fire to the estate in 1832. In 1893 Baroona was given an addition of a spiral staircase, a card room and a viewing terrace.

=== Pelerin ===
Located on 30 Edinburgh Avenue on 3370 sqm, Pelerin was built in the 1830s and is a stone-faced two storey building. In 1899 it sustained major storm damage. The home was rebuilt for D H Dight who decided to retain its original name. It has 27 rooms including 5 bedrooms, 3 bathrooms, study, and a timber kitchen. It has cedar joinery with 15-inch skirting board with 11-foot ceilings.

=== Ardersier House and Garden ===
Ardersier House was built in 1871 by Singleton's first mayor Alexander Munro. He named his property Ardersier after his birthplace in Scotland. It is a 1.26 ha property located at 48 Maitland Road. In 1981 it was listed in the National Trust. It has three bedrooms, two bathrooms, plus study and an attic of two large rooms.

=== Hambledon Hill ===
Completed in 1865, the land was given on a free grant to brothers Edward, Henry and William Nowland in 1824. Located on 535 Hambledon Hill Road, the land is 50 acres and is currently owned by artist Dale Frank. It has 7 bedrooms and 5 bathrooms. It is a two-storey sandstock brick home on stone foundations with hipped slate roof, a deep stone paved verandah, with cast-iron balustrade and French Doors. Last sold in September 2007 for $720,000.

== Population ==
According to the 2021 census, there were 17,018 people in the Singleton urban area.

- Aboriginal and Torres Strait Islander people made up 8.7% of the population.
- 85.4% of people were born in Australia. The next most common countries of birth were New Zealand 2.1%, England 1.5%, Philippines 1.1% and South Africa 0.6%.
- 90.3% of people spoke only English at home.
- The most common responses for religion were No Religion 36.4%, Anglican 22.2%, and Catholic 21.6%.

Historical population
Year	Pop.	±%
1921	3,270	—
1933	3,668	+12.2%
1947	3,940	+7.4%
1954	4,506	+14.4%
1961	4,519	+0.3%
1966	6,188	+36.9%
1971	7,187	+16.1%
1976	7,917	+10.2%
1981	9,572	+20.9%
1986	10,990	+14.8%
1991	11,861	+7.9%
1996	12,519	+5.5%
2001	12,495	−0.2%
2006	13,665	+9.4%
2011	13,961	+2.2%
2016	13,214	−5.4%
2021	14,229	+7.7%
Source: Australian Bureau of Statistics data.

== Climate ==
Singleton experiences a humid subtropical climate (Köppen: Cfa, Trewartha: Cfal), with hot summers and mild winters, and with a moderately low precipitation amount of 652.7 millimetres (25.71 in). Precipitation is more abundant during the summer, as the town is affected by foehn winds during winter and spring. The highest temperature recorded at Singleton was 43.6 °C (110.5 °F) on 15 January 2001; the lowest recorded was –4.2 °C (24.4 °F) on 16 August 1994.

Climate data for Singleton Water Board, New South Wales (1991–2002 normals and extremes); 40 m AMSL
Month	Jan	Feb	Mar	Apr	May	Jun	Jul	Aug	Sep	Oct	Nov	Dec	Year
Record high °C (°F)	43.6 (110.5)	40.0 (104.0)	41.0 (105.8)	34.7 (94.5)	28.2 (82.8)	25.4 (77.7)	26.0 (78.8)	30.4 (86.7)	33.0 (91.4)	39.0 (102.2)	43.0 (109.4)	41.4 (106.5)	43.6 (110.5)
Mean daily maximum °C (°F)	30.6 (87.1)	29.6 (85.3)	27.7 (81.9)	25.4 (77.7)	21.1 (70.0)	18.3 (64.9)	18.0 (64.4)	20.1 (68.2)	23.1 (73.6)	26.0 (78.8)	27.6 (81.7)	29.7 (85.5)	24.8 (76.6)
Daily mean °C (°F)	24.0 (75.2)	23.4 (74.1)	21.5 (70.7)	18.3 (64.9)	14.9 (58.8)	12.0 (53.6)	11.4 (52.5)	12.6 (54.7)	15.6 (60.1)	18.4 (65.1)	20.6 (69.1)	22.8 (73.0)	18.0 (64.3)
Mean daily minimum °C (°F)	17.3 (63.1)	17.2 (63.0)	15.2 (59.4)	11.1 (52.0)	8.6 (47.5)	5.6 (42.1)	4.8 (40.6)	5.0 (41.0)	8.0 (46.4)	10.7 (51.3)	13.5 (56.3)	15.9 (60.6)	11.1 (51.9)
Record low °C (°F)	9.6 (49.3)	9.6 (49.3)	7.5 (45.5)	2.5 (36.5)	0.4 (32.7)	−2.0 (28.4)	−3.9 (25.0)	−4.2 (24.4)	0.4 (32.7)	2.5 (36.5)	5.0 (41.0)	8.1 (46.6)	−4.2 (24.4)
Average precipitation mm (inches)	70.2 (2.76)	107.6 (4.24)	75.1 (2.96)	38.3 (1.51)	37.8 (1.49)	31.7 (1.25)	41.7 (1.64)	27.6 (1.09)	44.1 (1.74)	32.8 (1.29)	59.2 (2.33)	86.6 (3.41)	649.4 (25.57)
Average precipitation days (≥ 1.0 mm)	7.4	7.5	7.3	3.9	5.6	4.6	4.7	4.2	5.8	5.0	7.6	6.8	70.4
Average afternoon relative humidity (%)	49	52	54	51	60	57	54	44	43	43	46	47	50
Average dew point °C (°F)	15.6 (60.1)	16.5 (61.7)	15.2 (59.4)	12.3 (54.1)	10.9 (51.6)	8.0 (46.4)	6.5 (43.7)	5.3 (41.5)	7.4 (45.3)	9.6 (49.3)	11.6 (52.9)	14.1 (57.4)	11.1 (52.0)
Source: Australian Bureau of Meteorology (temperature, precipitation, humidity- 1991–2002 extremes)

== Transport ==
The town is located at the junction of the New England Highway and Putty Road. The Golden Highway branches northwest from the New England Highway ten kilometres south of Singleton. Construction of a bypass of the New England Highway commenced in July 2024.

Singleton is served by local and long-distance NSW TrainLink rail services. Singleton railway station on the Main Northern railway line is located at the southern end of the town centre. There are also local CDC NSW bus services.

== Economy ==
Major industries near Singleton include coal mining, electricity generation, light industry, vineyards, horse breeding and cattle production. Dairying was once a mainstay in the area, but has declined.

The largest employment industry is coal mining, which employs 24 percent of the town's workforce. Defence is the second largest employer with almost 4 percent of the workforce.

Lone Pine Barracks is located 8 kilometres (5.0 mi) south of Singleton.

== Media ==
=== Print ===
The Singleton Argus is a bi-weekly newspaper which was established in 1874. It is currently owned and published by Australian Community Media. The weekly newspaper that serves Singleton and the Hunter Valley is The Hunter Valley News, which, along with the Newcastle Herald newspaper (daily, except Sundays), is published by Australian Community Media. The Hunter River Times was established in 2020 and provides news for the surrounding Singleton area.

=== Radio ===
Radio stations that broadcast to the town are

- ABC Upper Hunter on 105.7 FM (part of ABC Local Radio)
- ABC Newcastle can also be received on 1233 AM (part of ABC Local Radio)
- Hit106.9 on 105.7 FM (commercial)
- Power FM 98.1 on 98.1 FM (community)
- 2NM on 981 AM (community)

=== Television ===
Singleton is part of the Newcastle–Hunter Region television market, which is served by 5 television networks, three commercial and two national services (which include new sub-channels that started in 2009 for the commercial networks and in recent years from the national services):

- ABC
- SBS
- Seven
- Nine
- Ten

== Tourism ==
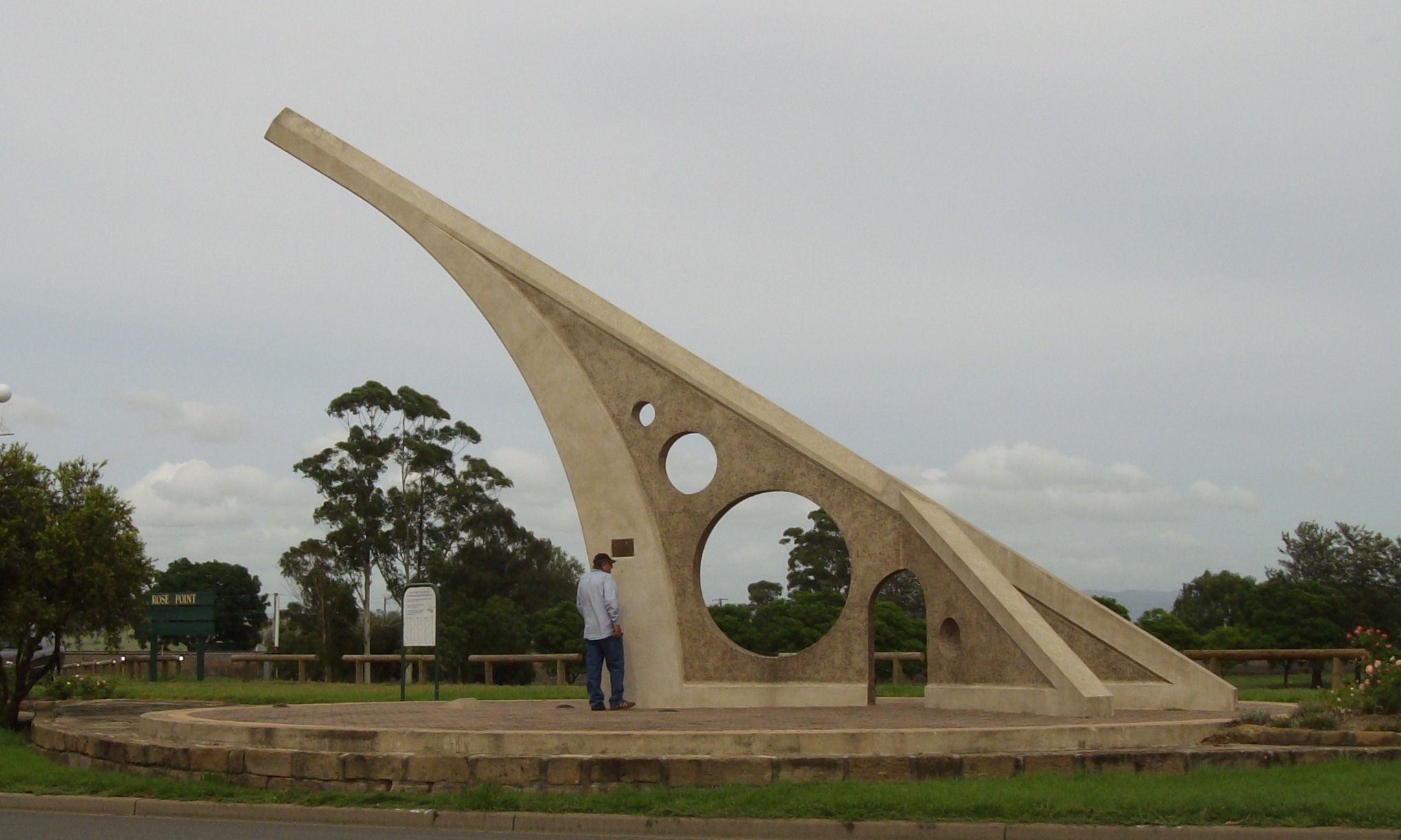
One of the world's largest sundials, Singleton

- Sundial. Singleton is home to one of the world's largest sundials, presented by a local coal mine for the 1988 Bicentennial Celebrations.
- Wineries. The town is close to the famous Pokolbin wine region (southeast). There are also many wineries in the shire, especially around Broke.
- Boating. Lake St Clair is an artificial lake located to the north of the town, with facilities for boating and camping.
- National Parks. Wollemi and Yengo National Parks are located south of the town via the Putty Road. Barrington Tops National Park borders the north of the shire.
- Museums. Singleton has three main museums, the Singleton Historic Society Museum in Burdekin Park, the Royal Australian Infantry Corps Museum at the nearby barracks and the Mercy Convent Museum 'Sacred Spaces' within the grounds of the Convent of the Sisters of Mercy (Singleton).
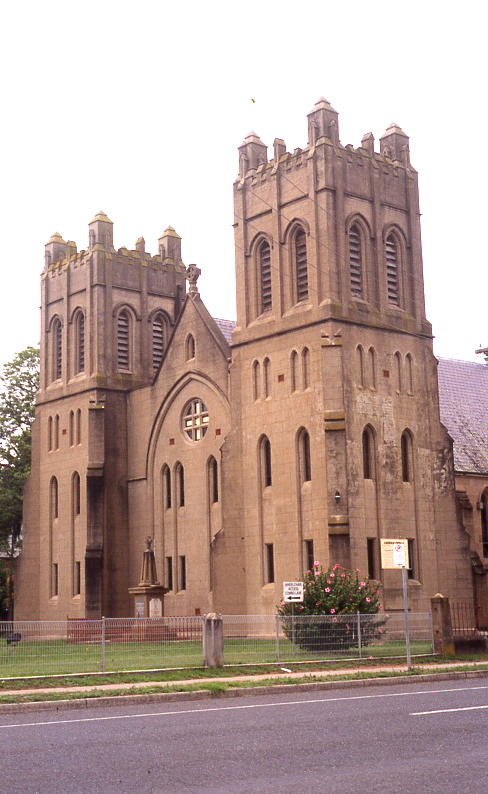
St Patrick's Catholic Church, Queen Street

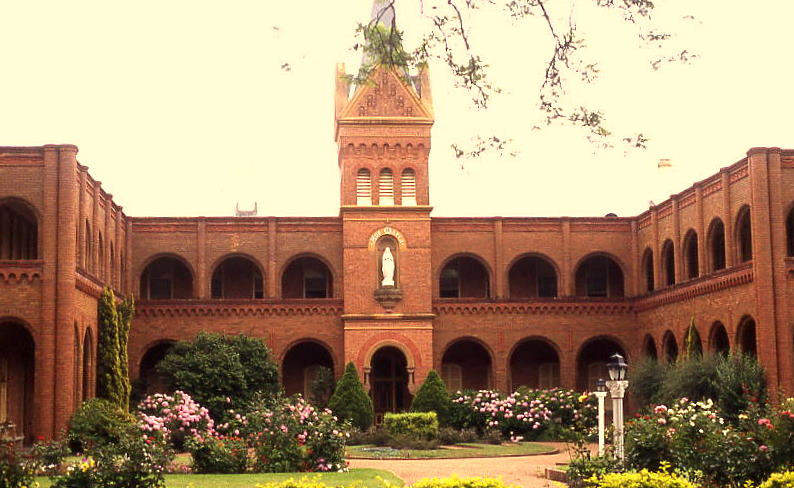
Convent of the Sisters of Mercy

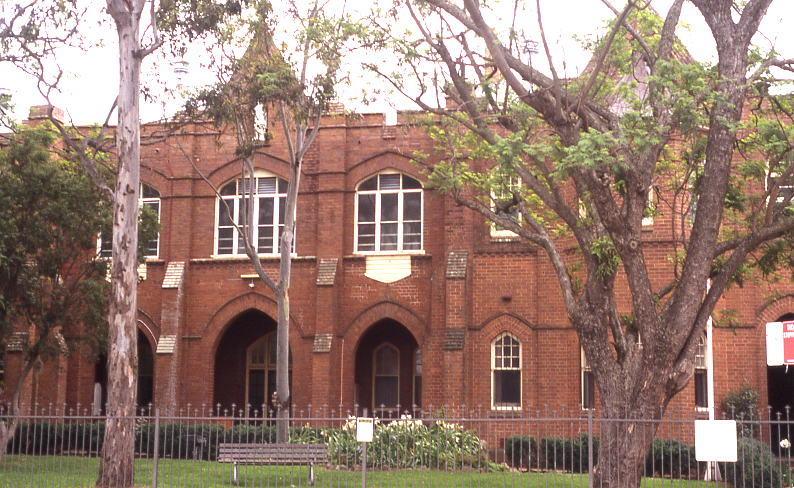
St Catherine's College

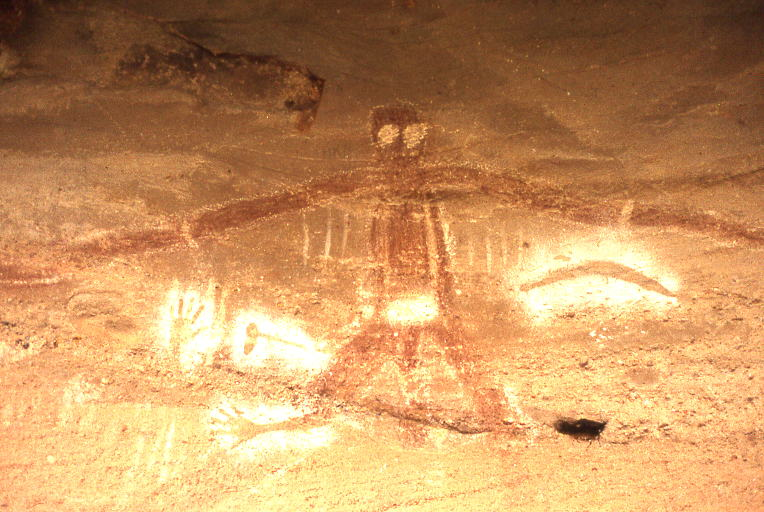
Aboriginal painting, Baiame Cave, Milbrodale

== Heritage listings ==
Singleton has a number of heritage-listed sites, including:

- 25 Dangar Road: Singleton District Hospital
- 25–27 George Street: Singleton Post Office
- 88 George Street: Ewbank
- Main Northern railway: Singleton railway station
- Queen Street: St Patrick's Roman Catholic Church Cemetery

== Education ==
Singleton is home to a number of educational facilities. These include schools operated by NSW Department of Education and two non-government schools at both Primary and Secondary levels; as well as a TAFE campus, Singleton Community College and a number of pre-schools. St Catherine's Catholic College provides classes from kindergarten to year 12, while Australian Christian College has classes from pre-kindergarten to year 12.

Schools operated by NSW Department of Education include:

- Broke Public School
- Jerrys Plains Public School
- King Street Public School
- Milbrodale Public School
- Kirkton Public School
- Mount Pleasant Public School
- Singleton Heights Public School
- Singleton Public School
- Singleton High School

Hunter Institute of TAFE operates a campus in Singleton. It provides training and further education as well as collaborating with secondary schools for students completing Senior years.

== Notable people ==
- Joseph Burnett – born in Singleton in 1899 and is best known as the Captain of the ill-fated HMAS Sydney, which was lost on 19 November 1941 in a battle with German auxiliary cruiser Kormoran
- Charles Dutton – a Queensland politician and great-great grandfather of Peter Dutton was born in Singleton
- Dale Frank – an artist, was born and currently lives in Singleton
- Carl Heine – was born in Singleton, missionary in the Marshall Islands, executed in April 1944 by Japanese authorities
- Kerrod Holland – a rugby league player
- Joy McKean – an Australian country music matriarch, was born in Singleton in 1930
- Cherie Nowlan – a television and film producer, was born in Singleton, best known for directing the 1997 film Thank God He Met Lizzie
- Toby Price – the 2016 Dakar Rally champion lives in Singleton
- Wendy Richardson OAM – a playwright, was born in Singleton in 1933
- Anthony Joseph Burgess – a roman catholic bishop
- Sean Rudder – a rugby league player
- Josh Valentine – a rugby union player
- Sir Charles Wade – a former premier of New South Wales, serving from 1907 to 1910, was born in Singleton
- Jimmy Crute – a professional mixed martial artist signed to the UFC, was born in Singleton
- Steve Merrick – an Australian representative Rugby Union player, was born and lives in Singleton

== Sister city ==
Japan - Takahata, Yamagata, Japan

== See also ==
- List of world's largest roadside attractions
