= Singleton Council =

- Local government area
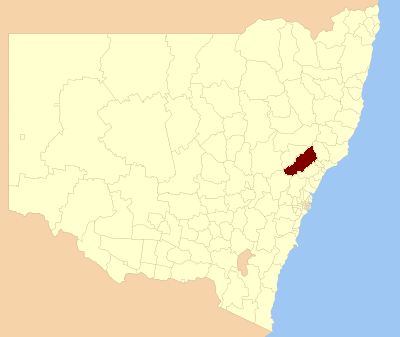
- Location in New South Wales

- Interactive map of Singleton Council
- Coordinates: 32°34′S 151°10′E
- Country: Australia
- State: New South Wales
- Region: Hunter
- Established: 1 January 1976
- Council seat: Singleton

Government
  - Mayor: Cr Sue Moore
  - State electorates: Upper Hunter; Cessnock
  - Federal division: Hunter

Area
  - Total: 4,893 km^{2} (1,889 sq mi)

Population
  - Totals: 22,987 (2016 census); 23,422 (2018 est.)
  - Density: 4.6979/km^{2} (12.1676/sq mi)
- Time zone: UTC+10 (AEST)
  - Summer (DST): UTC+11 (AEDT)
- Website: Singleton Council
LGAs around Singleton Council
Muswellbrook	Upper Hunter	Dungog
Muswellbrook	Singleton Council	Maitland
Mid-Western	Hawkesbury	Cessnock

Singleton Council is a local government area in the Hunter Region of New South Wales, Australia. It is situated adjacent to the New England Highway and the Main North railway line.

The mayor of the council is Cr. Sue Moore, an independent politician.

Singleton Shire was established on 1 January 1976 with the amalgamation of Patrick Plains Shire and the Municipality of Singleton.

== History ==
=== Aboriginal history ===
Singleton and the surrounding area was originally occupied by The Wonnarua / Wanaruah people and they are the traditional land owners of the Singleton area.

=== Early history ===
The town is named after Ben Singleton who explored the area in 1820s. In 1821 he started to occupy the land. In 1823 he started an agistment business on the Hunter River and started a flour mill in 1827. In 1829 the town expanded to a post office and an inn.

== Main towns and villages ==
The Council area includes Singleton, Broke, Bulga, Howes Valley, Putty, Warkworth, Jerrys Plains, Camberwell, Ravensworth, Mount Olive, Carrowbrook, Mirranie, Elderslie, Belford and Branxton.

== Demographics ==
At the 2011 census, there were 22,694 people in the Singleton Council local government area, of these 51.3 per cent were male and 48.7 per cent were female. Aboriginal and Torres Strait Islander people made up 3.7 per cent of the population, which was higher than the national and state averages of 2.5 per cent. The median age of people in the Singleton Council area was 35 years, which was slightly lower than the national median of 37 years. Children aged 0–14 years made up 22.2 per cent of the population and people aged 65 years and over made up 10.4 per cent of the population. Of people in the area aged 15 years and over, 51.5 per cent were married and 10.5 per cent were either divorced or separated.

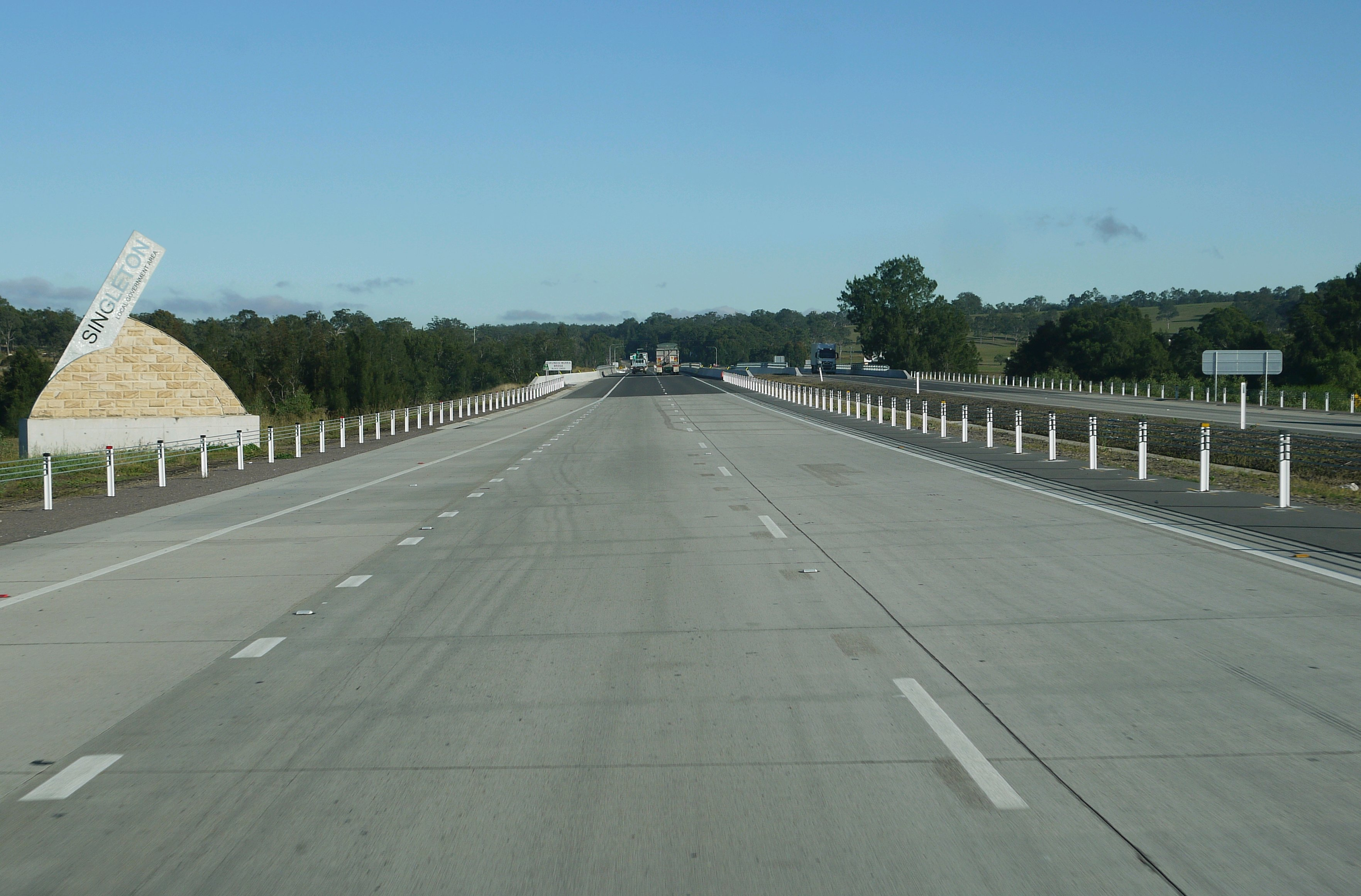
Singleton Council boundary, at the western end of the Hunter Expressway near Black Creek

Population growth in the Singleton Council area between the 2001 census and the 2006 census was 8.12 per cent; and in the subsequent five years to the 2011 census, population growth was 3.45 per cent. When compared with total population growth of Australia for the same periods, being 5.78 per cent and 8.32 per cent respectively, population growth in the Singleton Council local government area was slightly lower than the national average. The median weekly income for residents within the Singleton Council area was marginally higher than the national average.

At the 2011 census, the proportion of residents in the Singleton Council local government area who stated their ancestry as Australian or Anglo-Celtic exceeded 83 per cent of all residents (national average was 65.2 per cent). In excess of 69% of all residents in the Singleton Council area nominated a religious affiliation with Christianity at the 2011 census, which was significantly higher than the national average of 50.2 per cent. Meanwhile, as at the census date, compared to the national average, households in the Singleton Council local government area had a significantly lower than average proportion (4.0 per cent) where two or more languages are spoken (national average was 20.4 per cent); and a significantly higher proportion (93.5 per cent) where English only was spoken at home (national average was 76.8 per cent).

Selected historical census data for the Singleton Council local government area
Census year		2001	2006	2011
Population	Estimated residents on Census night	20,290	21,937	22,694
Population	LGA rank in terms of size within New South Wales			
Population	% of New South Wales population			0.33%
Population	% of Australian population	0.11%	0.11%	0.11%
Cultural and language diversity				
Ancestry, top responses	Australian			36.8%
Ancestry, top responses	English			31.5%
Ancestry, top responses	Irish			7.8%
Ancestry, top responses	Scottish			7.3%
Ancestry, top responses	German			3.6%
Language, top responses (other than English)	Afrikaans	n/c	▲0.1%	▲0.4%
Language, top responses (other than English)	German	0.1%	▲0.2%	0.2%
Language, top responses (other than English)	Italian	n/c	n/c	▲0.1%
Language, top responses (other than English)	Filipino	0.1%	▼ n/c	▲0.1%
Language, top responses (other than English)	Cantonese	n/c	▲0.2%	▼0.1%
Religious affiliation				
Religious affiliation, top responses	Anglican	38.6%	▼36.4%	▼34.6%
Religious affiliation, top responses	Catholic	26.3%	▼26.2%	26.2%
Religious affiliation, top responses	No Religion	9.2%	▲11.4%	▲15.5%
Religious affiliation, top responses	Uniting Church	7.5%	▼7.0%	▼6.2%
Religious affiliation, top responses	Presbyterian and Reformed	3.2%	▼2.9%	▼2.8%
Median weekly incomes				
Personal income	Median weekly personal income		A$487	A$640
Personal income	% of Australian median income		104.5%	▲110.9%
Family income	Median weekly family income		A$1,458	A$1,927
Family income	% of Australian median income		124.5%	▲130.1%
Household income	Median weekly household income		A$1,258	A$1,692
Household income	% of Australian median income		122.5%	▲137.1%

== Council ==
=== Current composition and election method ===
Singleton Council is composed of ten councillors, including the mayor, for a fixed four-year term of office. The mayor is directly elected while the nine other councillors are elected proportionally as one entire ward. The most recent election was held on 4 December 2021, and the makeup of the council, including the mayor, is as follows:

Party	Councillors
Independent and unaligned	9
Labor	1
Total	10

The current Council, elected in 2021, in order of election by ward, is:

Councillor	Party	Notes
Sue Moore	Independent	Mayor
Danny Thompson	Independent	
Tony Jarrett	Labor	
Tony McNamara	Independent	
Malinda McLachlan	Independent	Left Shooters, Fishers and Farmers Party in December 2022
Val Scott	Unaligned	
Godfrey Adamthwaite	Independent	
Sue George	Independent	
Belinda Charlton	Independent	
Hollee Jenkins	Independent	

== Election results ==
=== 2024 ===
2024 New South Wales local elections: Singleton
Party	Candidate	Votes	%	±%
Independent	Sue Moore (elected Mayor)	3,318	26.11	+1.85
Independent	Danny Thompson (elected 3)	2,945	23.17	+5.50
Labor	1. Peree Watson (elected 1); 2. Patrick Thompson (elected 9); 3. Timothy McGeachie	1,987	15.63	
Independent	Malinda (Mel) McLachlan (elected 2)	1,638	12.89	−2.46
Independent	Godfrey Adamthwaite (elected 5)	677	5.33	−1.72
Independent	Hollee Jenkins (elected 6)	672	5.29	+1.61
Libertarian	Scott Yeomans (elected 8)	493	3.88	
Independent	Sue George (elected 4)	457	3.60	+1.30
Greens	Louise Scott	397	3.12	
Independent	Anne McGowan (elected 7)	126	0.99	
Total formal votes		12,710	85.19	
Informal votes		2,210	14.81	
Turnout		14,920	83.79%	

=== 2022 ===
2022 New South Wales local elections: Singleton (Note: Changes compared with the results at the 2021 elections.)
Party	Candidate	Votes	%	±%
Independent	Danny Thompson (elected 3)	2,208	17.70	+0.00
Shooters, Fishers, Farmers	Mel McLachlan (elected 1)	2,168	17.38	+6.98
Labor	Tony Jarrett (elected 4)	1,557	12.48	+0.08
Independent	Godfrey Adamthwaite (elected 1)	1,270	10.18	+3.08
Labor	Sarah Johnstone (elected 5)	886	7.10	+3.60
Independent	Hollee Jenkins (elected 8)	853	6.84	+2.57
Independent	Val Scott (elected 7)	847	6.79	+3.99
Independent	Sue George (elected 6)	782	6.27	+3.97
Independent	Tony McNamara (elected 9)	494	3.96	+1.46
Independent	Belinda Charlton	480	3.85	−2.15
Independent	Kay Sullivan	406	3.25	+0.95
Independent	Shane Feeney	330	2.65	+2.65
Independent	Wayne Riley	194	1.56	+1.56
Total formal votes		12,475	94.09	+5.19
Informal votes		784	5.91	−5.19
Turnout		13,259	76.70	−7.30
