= James Cobb White =

Australian politician (1855–1927)

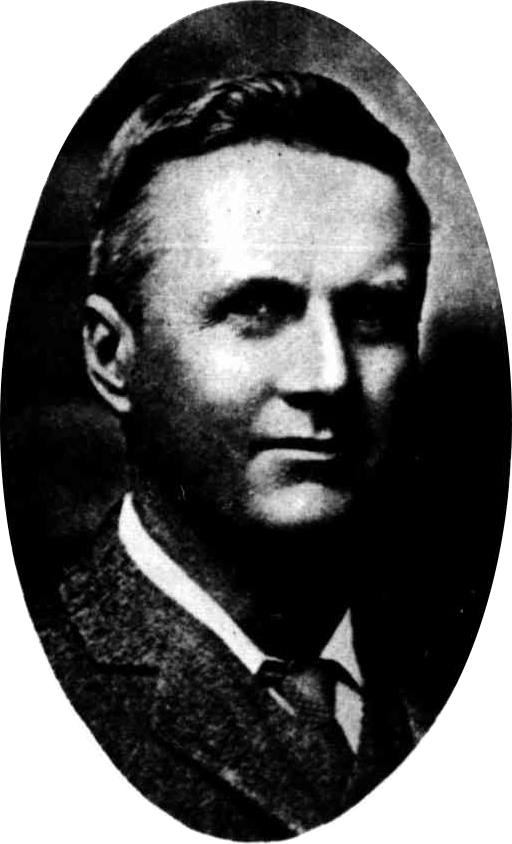

James Cobb White (29 November 1855 – 18 January 1927) was an Australian grazier and politician, predominantly in New South Wales.

He was born at the property Edinglassie, near Muswellbrook, to pastoralist Frank White and Mary Hannah Cobb, the second of five brothers. He also had a younger sister, Mary Sarah. He received a private education, initially at Newcastle Grammar School and then in Sydney. On leaving school he worked at the Commercial Bank of Australia. On his father's death in 1875 James entered into a partnership with his elder brother Francis, operating a number of properties, including Edinglassie, while his younger brothers Henry, William, Arthur, and Victor, formed a partnership that operated another family property, Belltrees. James married Emmeline Eliza Ebsworth on 13 April 1882 and they had five children, 2 daughters and 3 sons. In a dynastic union, Henry and Arthur married sisters of Emiline, Henry married Louisa Maude in 1887 and Arthur married Millicent in 1893.

In 1880 he commenced construction of a two-storey sandstone house at Edinglassie in a simplified Italianate style, designed by John Horbury Hunt and the second stage was completed around 1895. The property was listed on the New South Wales State Heritage Register on 2 April 1999 as illustrating the degree of opulence achieved and lifestyles led by the leading pastoral families in the area. He was recognised as an authority on Aberdeen Angus and as a breeder of stud cattle, including Durham shorthorn, Devon, Hereford and horses, including Welsh ponies and light Clydesdales. He had a reputation for locating suitable places for sinking a well using a divining rod.

He and his brother Francis expanded their holdings to include further property in New South Wales, Queensland and the Northern Territory. In 1906 he was appointed a temporarily councillor for the Wybong Shire, (renamed Muswellbrook in 1907), serving as shire president in 1924. He was President of the Muswellbrook Agricultural and Pastoral Association, Upper Hunter Pastoral and Agricultural Association and chairman of the Denman Pastures Protection Board.

In 1908 he was a Liberal nominee to the New South Wales Legislative Council, where he remained until his death. He did not regularly attend parliament.

Emmeline died on 1 December 1926, and White died at Edinglassie the following month (aged 71). They were survived by their sons, James, Allan and Bruce and daughters Jessie and Ruth.

His father, uncle James, and nephew Harold also served in the Parliament of New South Wales. He was an uncle of the writer Patrick White, however they were not close.
