= Weidmann Cottage =

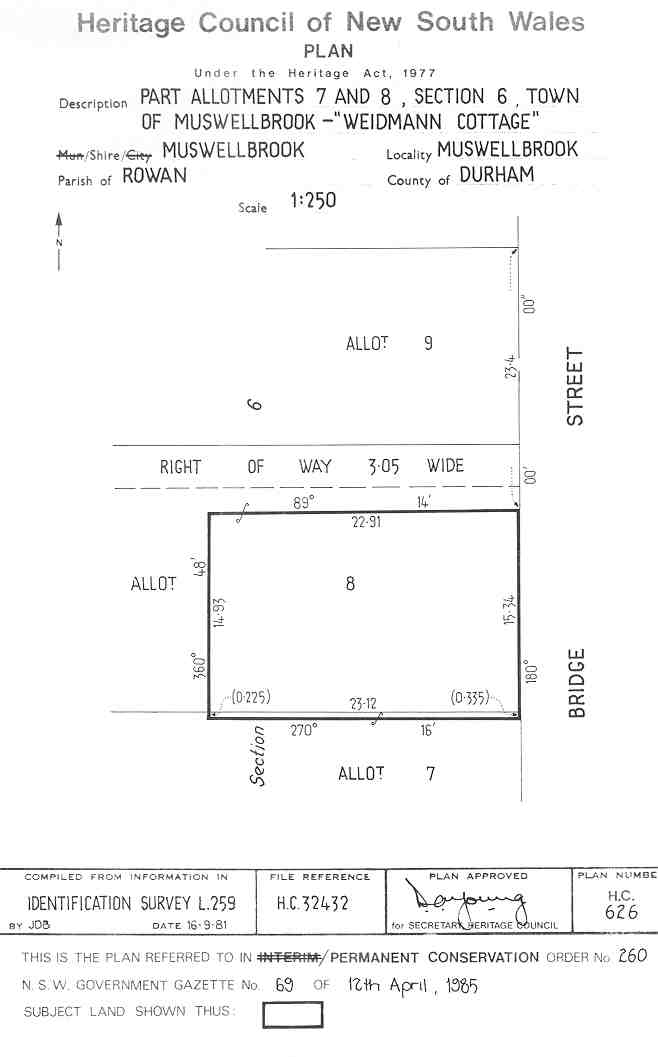
- Heritage boundaries

- Location within New South Wales Location within Australia
- 32°15′42″S 150°53′20″E
- Location: 132 Bridge Street, Muswellbrook, Muswellbrook Shire, New South Wales, Australia

History
- Built: 1840–1845

Site notes
- Owner: Muswellbrook Shire Council

New South Wales Heritage Register
- Official name: Weidmann Cottage
- Type: State heritage (built)
- Designated: 2 April 1999
- Reference no.: 260
- Type: Cottage
- Category: Residential buildings (private)

Weidmann Cottage is a heritage-listed former retail building, residence and town house and now unused building located at 132 Bridge Street, Muswellbrook in the Muswellbrook Shire local government area of New South Wales, Australia. It was built from 1840 to 1845. The property is owned by Muswellbrook Shire Council and was added to the New South Wales State Heritage Register on 2 April 1999.

== History ==
Weidman Cottage lies on a Crown grant given to David Brown on 27 November 1838. He sold the property to Henry Richard Clovell McAlpin, a store and innkeeper. The year of this transaction is not known.

Stafford sold the property to Albert Weidman, whom the cottage is named after, in 1891. The property remained in Weidman family hands until 1977 when it was purchased by Muswellbrook Council. However, in 1935 the property was transferred into the name of A.Weidman & Company Ltd, passing out of individual private ownership.

The cottage was constructed sometime between 1840 and 1850, and quite probably before 1845, by the original owner David Brown. The building was erected as one of a pair of semi-detached town cottages. The other cottage has since been demolished to make way for the council public library. Brown appears to have erected the buildings as a speculative venture or as a town residence. An inspection of the building suggested that part of the ground floor served as a shop. It is also possible that Brown was the designer, there being no record of an architect having been employed.

The property was purchased by another storekeeper, William Corby Thompson in 1867 who sold it to David Stafford in 1882.

An adjoining building sharing a common south wall with Weidmann Cottage was later built as a semi detached two storey dwelling similar in all respects to the cottage. Photographs support the possibility that this building was an exact copy of Weidmann Cottage.

Albert Weidmann, who purchased both properties in 1891 used the adjoining residence as his butcher shop. Prior to being demolished in 1977, the second cottage was used as a cakeshop.

Albert Weidmann was born in Muswellbrook and contributed significantly to the local community over a 50-year period in commercial, pastoral and sporting interests. In addition to his contribution to the Upper Hunter community, his brother Alexander was one of the founders of the Muswellbrook Colliery and his eldest son, Leslie Albert Weidmann left sufficient funds on his death to facilitate construction of the Weidmann Memorial Wing at Muswellbrook District Hospital.

== Description ==
Weidman Cottage is located on gently rising ground on the western side of Bridge Street, the town's main thoroughfare and has been incorporated within the precinct of the public library, which is at its rear.

The two-storey stone section of the building and its projecting top verandah contribute greatly to the streetscape of Bridge Street and in particular, their relationship to nearby Loxton House.

The building consists of a predominately symmetrically designed monolithic structure constructed of sandstone, probably quarried from "Ravensworth". The building comprises a 2-storey main structure of four rooms with the remains of an original one room stone wing extending on the west side at the south end.

A typical colonial middle / working-class house of the period - a merchant's townhouse.

The building has a colonnaded verandah along the east facade, a light timber framed outbuilding on the western side at the northern end and a cellar. All these appear to be original except for the ground floor terrace brick coping walls which were built in the 1920s.

The building is constructed of quarried sandstone and fieldstone and the south wall of quarried rubble. Internal walls are of similar rubble masonry finished with hair plaster and painted. The roof is corrugated galvanised iron. The double storeyed verandah and posts had a simple infill balustrade at first floor level, evident today.

=== Condition ===
As at 13 August 1997 the physical condition of the building was fair; and the archaeological potential assessed as medium.

Externally the building has not been substantially altered except for the rear western elevation and removal of the semi-detached building at the south end. Internally, apart from general deterioration, the cottage generally remains as it would have bee,

=== Modifications and dates ===
Modifications to the structure include:

- c. 1900–1914 – Large timber framed and weatherboard sheeted extension added.
- c. 1910 – Verandah altered
- Post 1910 – Back wing reconstructed
- Back skillion possibly contemporary.

== Heritage listing ==
As at 28 September 2009, Weidmann cottage was a sturdy, monolithic structure of symmetrical proportions and reflects the type of architecture and design of a typical colonial middle/working-class house of the period - a merchant's townhouse. The two storey stone section of the building and its verandah contribute greatly to the streetscape of Bridge Street and in particular, their relationship to nearby Loxton House.

Weidmann Cottage was listed on the New South Wales State Heritage Register on 2 April 1999 having satisfied the following criteria.

The place is important in demonstrating the course, or pattern, of cultural or natural history in New South Wales.

The building is a good example of a typical merchant class townhouse and as such is an important element in both the streetscape of Bridge Street and the ongoing social history of the community.

The place is important in demonstrating aesthetic characteristics and/or a high degree of creative or technical achievement in New South Wales.

The building is a well proportioned, symmetrically designed middle-era colonial town residence typical of the reasonably affluent middle/working class merchant housing. It exhibits an interesting and very broad use of solid masonry walls devoid of moulding and utilising stone lintels in otherwise rough hewn stone walls.

The place is important in demonstrating the principal characteristics of a class of cultural or natural places/environments in New South Wales.

The building is a typical merchant class townhouse.

== See also ==
- Australian residential architectural styles
