= Rous Lench =

Rous Lench may refer to:

- Rous Lench, Muswellbrook, a heritage-listed homestead in Muswellbrook, Australia
- Rous Lench, Worcestershire, a village in the United Kingdom
