= John Bridge Woolstore =

Australian heritage-listed building

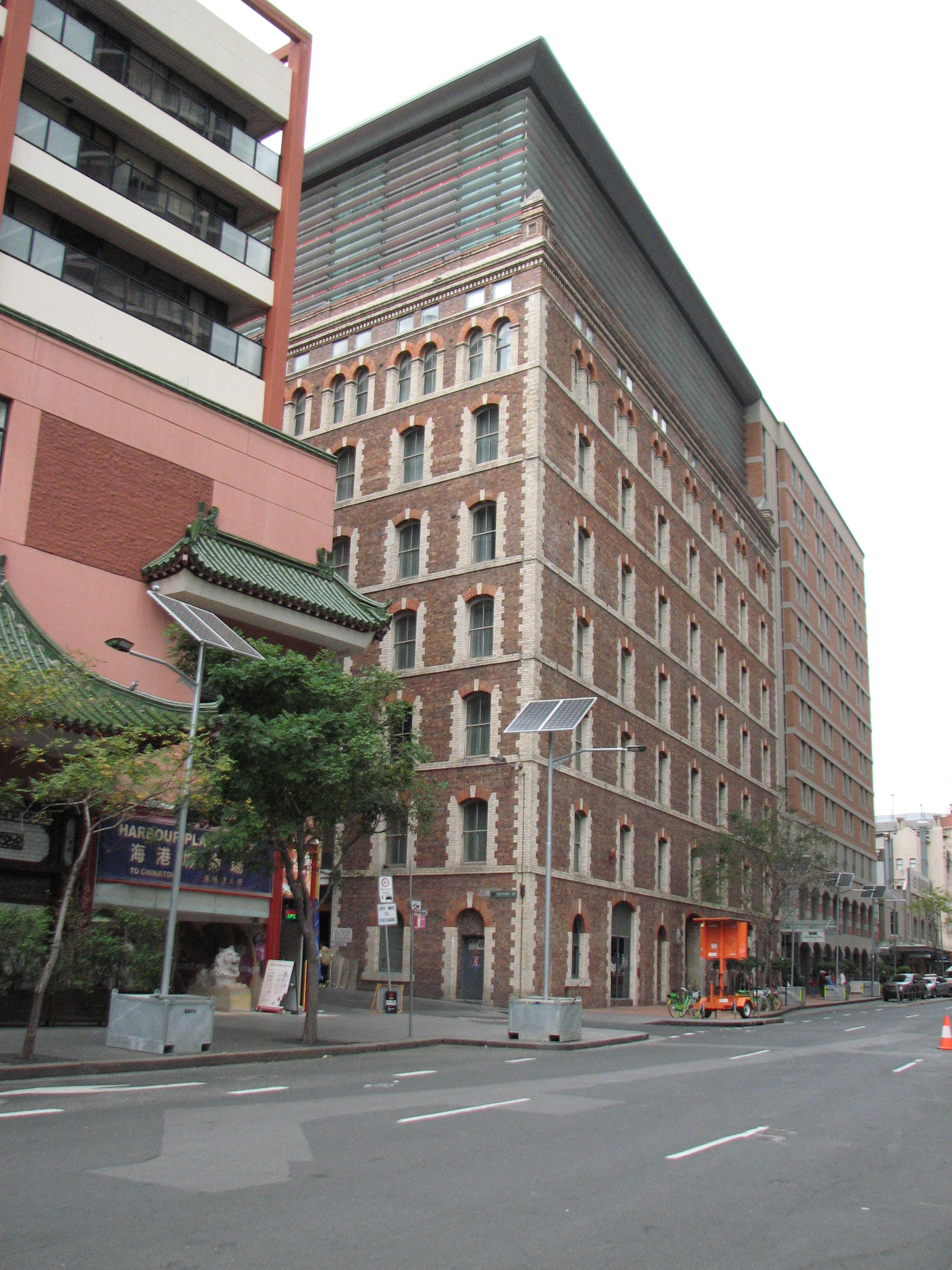
- John Bridge Woolstore, 64 Harbour Street, Sydney

- Location within Sydney Location within Australia
- 33.8783°S 151.2036°E
- Location: 64 Harbour Street, Sydney, City of Sydney, New South Wales, Australia

History
- Built: 1889
- Built for: John Bridge & Co

Site notes
- Architect: William Pritchard or his son Arthur Pritchard (attrib.)
- Architectural style: Victorian Free Classical

New South Wales Heritage Register
- Official name: Post Office Stores
- Type: State heritage (built)
- Designated: 2 April 1999
- Reference no.: 608
- Type: Post Office
- Category: Postal and Telecommunications
- Builders: Stuart Brothers

The John Bridge Woolstore is a heritage-listed former warehouse located at 64 Harbour Street, in the Sydney central business district, in the City of Sydney local government area. It was probably designed by either William Pritchard or his son Arthur Pritchard, and was built by Stuart Bros. in 1889. It was added to the New South Wales State Heritage Register on 2 April 1999.

== History ==
This former wool warehouse was designed in 1889 for John Bridge & Co and constructed by Stuart Brothers. John Bridge & Co was one of the leading wool and grain businesses of Australia. The building was used as a woolstore until it was acquired by the Commonwealth Government in 1914, for use as a Postmaster-General's Department stores branch. Its designer was probably William Pritchard. A perspective drawing published in The Freeman's Journal in April 1889 bears the Pritchard name (the initial is missing, so it is not known whether it was William or his son Arthur, who was also an architect). The building is often likened to the enlarged Mort & Co wool warehouse designed at Circular Quay by the Blackets (or by John Horbury Hunt when he was in Blacket's office). Like the Harbour Street warehouse, the Mort building had a roof of sawtooth truss construction with south-light glazing to provide excellent light in the top floor, conventionally the wool sale floor. Hunt claimed that he introduced this roof form into Australia. Interestingly, Blacket & Son designed a wool warehouse for a Jonathon Bridge in 1882. It also had a sawtooth roof. In 1977 the former John Bridge warehouse was converted to offices. In 1989 the internal structure of cast iron columns and heavy timber girders was demolished and the whole converted to its present hotel use. In 1992, the ground floor was converted to a licensed tavern.

== Description ==
Designed in the Victorian Free Classical style, the building addresses both Harbour Street and Factory Street in a distinguished planar design. The storey levels are marked in the orange-brown walling by projecting bands, and the angles of the facades and the window reveals are quoined, with cream bricks. The arches of the openings are laid in red bricks. The parapet is rendered as a panelled entablature. The great thickness of the perimeter walls at ground floor level signifies the difficulty encountered in traditional loadbearing construction as building heights increased. Internally the seven levels of the old building were gutted and in 1989 replaced by a concrete structure; the only original structural elements now visible are re-positioned in the ground-floor restaurant in the south end. The cruciform-section cast iron columns have distinctive saddle-form capitals and stiffening rings, and the heavy timber girders support timber joists.

It is now part of a modern hotel development (now Furama Darling Harbour) which extends to Little Hay Street to the south.

== Heritage listing ==
The John Bridge Woolstore was listed on the New South Wales State Heritage Register (as the Post Office Stores) on 2 April 1999.

=== Significance ===
The former John Bridge Woolstore has historic significance for its association with John Bridge & Co, one of the leading wool and grain businesses for which it was built. Now part of the Holiday Inn Darling Harbour (formerly Furama Hotel), it is a rare example of a large fine Victorian period woolstore beautifully built in polychrome brickwork. It is a superbly-scaled element in the streetscape. It is representative of a period of development which saw many warehouses constructed around the piers, wharves and goods railway sidings of Darling Harbour. The small display section of cruciform cast-iron structure retained from the original structure has scientific significance.

== See also ==
- Australian non-residential architectural styles
- Media related to John Bridge Woolstore at Wikimedia Commons
