= Edinglassie (New South Wales) =

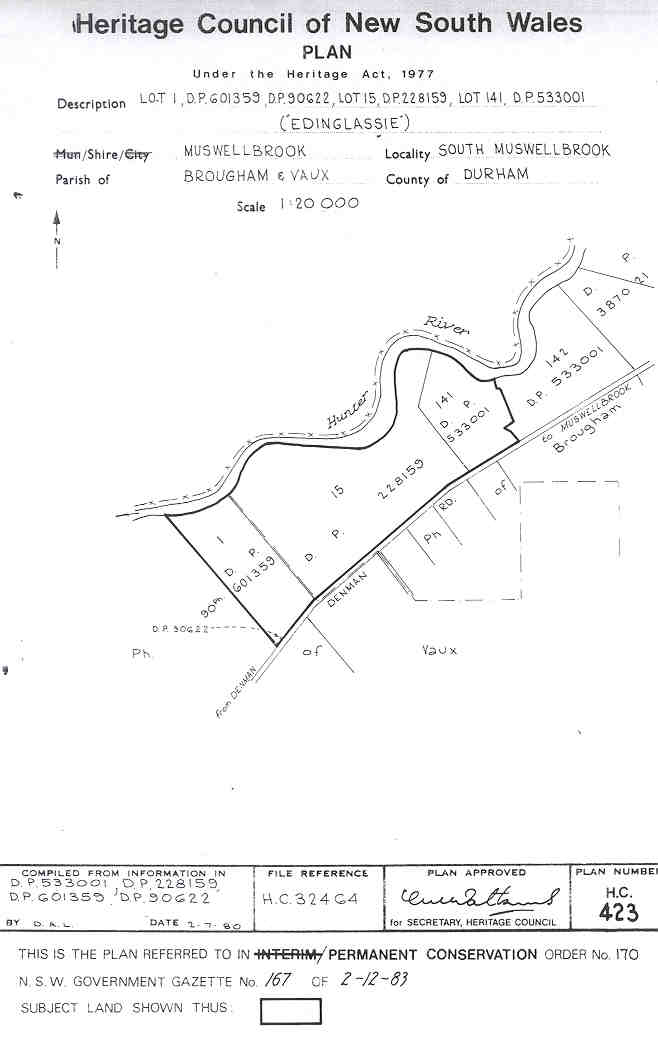
- Heritage boundaries

- Location within New South Wales Location within Australia
- 32°18′12″S 150°49′44″E
- Location: 710 Denman Road, Muswellbrook, Muswellbrook Shire, New South Wales, Australia

History
- Built: 1880–1895

Site notes
- Architect: John Horbury Hunt
- Architectural style: Italianate

New South Wales Heritage Register
- Official name: Edinglassie
- Type: State heritage (landscape)
- Designated: 2 April 1999
- Reference no.: 170
- Type: Homestead Complex
- Category: Farming and Grazing

Edinglassie is a heritage-listed farm and homestead located at 710 Denman Road, Muswellbrook in the Hunter region of New South Wales, Australia. It was built from 1880 to 1895. It was added to the New South Wales State Heritage Register on 2 April 1999.

== History ==
The land on which both Edinglassie and Rous Lench are located was the original Portion 4 of the Parish of Brougham in the County of Durham. This comprised an area of 520 hectares (1,280 acres) the deed of grant for which was issued to George Forbes on 1 August 1839. Like many grants of the period the land had been occupied for many years before it was officially surveyed and the deed grant issued.

A two-storey sandstone house with hipped iron roof of simplified Italianate style built in two stages c. 1880, and c. 1895, for James White, designed by John Horbury Hunt.

== Description ==
The house is approached through original iron gates and through well kept grounds containing many fine mature trees, including some Queensland species brought from other White family properties. The homestead is set back from the access road, and a substantial line of screening trees fronts the entrance. The siting of the homestead is intrinsic to its significance.

A two-storey sandstone house with hipped iron roof of simplified Italianate style built in two stages c. 1880, and c. 1895, for James White. Each elevation is asymmetrical about a large full height projecting bay with a continuous single storey verandah (originally two stories to east and south) supported on cast iron columns stamped 'F. REVETT, W. MAITLAND.'

The fourteen principal rooms have a variety of pressed metal ceilings and marble and timber fireplaces whilst the fine joinery throughout is of cedar. All joinery has been sensitively restored.

A timber bridge links across a large trussed roof breezeway to a two-storey service wing containing the original kitchen. Close to the house is the fine stables group of buildings designed by Hunt in timber and built in the 1880s. Although lacking in the more exuberant details characteristic of Hunt's work, these buildings nonetheless form a coherent and impressive whole. Other buildings include a meat house, killing shed and dovecote.

=== Modifications and dates ===
The following modifications have been made to the site:

- 2004 – Power line installed across front of property, involving the removal of three trees. An arborist report, submitted as part of the application identifies this fabric as one yellow box (Eucalyptus melliodora), 40–45 years old, 12 metres (39 ft) high; and two Lombardy poplar (Populus nigra Italica), native to Italy, 10–14 years old, 5 metres (16 ft) high.

== Heritage listing ==
As at 31 July 2007, the Edinglassie property including the Edinglassie homestead, associated buildings and Rous Lench cottage are closely associated with the earliest European occupation of the area and collectively represent one of the earliest land grants of the initial settlement of the Hunter Valley.

The Edinglassie property demonstrates various phases of human activities such as settlement and clearing, water supply and management, sheep and cattle running, development of specialist cattle breeding activities, recreation, viticulture and horse breeding.

The Edinglassie homestead with its associated outbuildings and Rous Lench cottage are good architectural examples of their type and style.

The Edinglassie property demonstrates an excellent application of the Arcadian design approach to the siting of structures and elements in the landscape which is rare in the region.

The place is also significant because it is associated with George Forbes, the original grantee, who was one of the "gentry" settlers in the early settlement of the area. It is associated with a prominent family, the Whites, a leading pastoral dynasty, who were synonymous with the opening and development of the region. It illustrates the degree of opulence achieved and lifestyles led by the leading pastoral families in the area. It is associated with a significant Australian architect, John Horbury Hunt.

It is a well known landmark, and has provided a community focus over a number of generations form the turn of the 19th century. It has extant and potential intact archaeological evidence capable of helping interpret past occupation and lifestyles of the area.

The siting of the homestead is intrinsic to its significance.

Edinglassie was listed on the New South Wales State Heritage Register on 2 April 1999.

== See also ==
- Australian residential architectural styles
