= St Alban's Anglican Church, Muswellbrook =

St Alban's Anglican Church
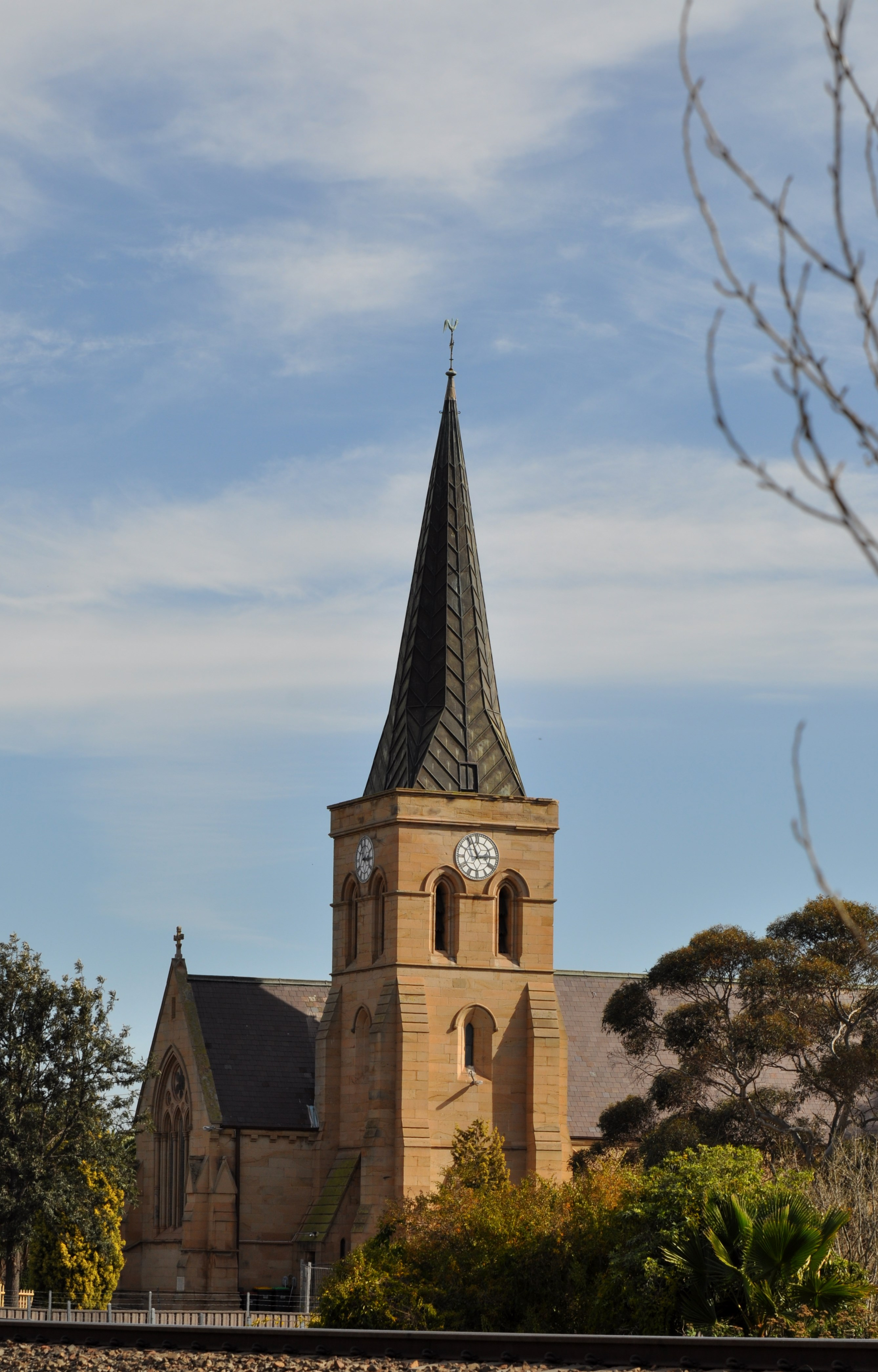
- The steeple of St Alban's Anglican Church, Muswellbrook, in 2013

- Location of St Alban's Anglican Church in New South Wales
- 32°15′45″S 150°53′14″E
- Location: Hunter Terrace, Muswellbrook, Muswellbrook Shire, New South Wales
- Country: Australia
- Denomination: Anglican
- Website: www.anglicanmuswellbrook.com.au

History
- Status: Church

Architecture
- Architect: Sir George Gilbert Scott
- Architectural type: English, Victorian Gothic Revival
- Years built: 1864–1869

Administration
- Province: New South Wales
- Diocese: Newcastle
- Parish: Muswellbrook

New South Wales Heritage Register
- Official name: St. Alban's Anglican Church; St Albans Church
- Type: State heritage (built)
- Designated: 2 April 1999
- Reference no.: 458
- Type: Church
- Category: Religion
- Builders: Edmund Blacket supervised by John Horbury Hunt

St Alban's Anglican Church is a heritage-listed Anglican church located at Hunter Terrace, Muswellbrook in the Muswellbrook Shire local government area of New South Wales, Australia. It was designed by Sir George Gilbert Scott and built from 1864 to 1869 by James Black and Son, stonemasons and builders, work supervised by John Horbury Hunt. It is also known as St. Alban's Anglican Church and St Albans Church. The property is owned by the Trustees of the Anglican Diocese of Newcastle. The church was added to the New South Wales State Heritage Register on 2 April 1999.

== History ==
In 1981 the National Trust classified the St Alban's Church precinct. Within the precinct are St Alban's Church, the Gothic fence, the bellcote, the Rectory and the Sunday School Hall with attached residence. The church is the only known design for a church executed in Australia based on the designs of Sir George Gilbert Scott. The construction was supervised by John Horbury Hunt on behalf of Edmund Blacket.

The church is a superb example of English, Victorian Gothic Revival. Complete with 19th century plantings, fence and bellcote. The precinct "is closely identified the artistic and religious patronage of the White family, which was responsible more than any other, for much of the 19th century development in the Hunter Valley. The Rectory was built c. 1881 and for many years was the residence of Mrs Jane Wilson, sister of the Archdeacon W. E. White, Rector of the Parish from 1860-1900. It was acquired by the church in 1937 and now forms an essential element of the precinct. It is a good example of late 19th-century romanticism, featuring a complexity of gables, hipped roofs, tall chimneys and a semi-circular, single storey wing. The Sunday School and Hall, erected in 1874 as the St. Alban's School, was the first non-ecclesiastical building undertaken by Horbury Hunt. It was in pious memory of Sarah White, and Francis, her son, to the glory of God. Special features of this building are bellcote on the roof ridge, a triple arch porch, multiple gables and high chimney stacks. It is constructed of warm red sandstock bricks recovered from the original St. Alban's (c. 1840). The attached residence was initially for the schoolmaster, later for the schoolmaster, later for the organist and currently for the curate. In 1934, a kindergarten room, stage and porch were added in a style compatible with Hunt's concept. The rear room was dedicated in memory of Lillian Luke, cousin of Mrs Jane Wilson.

== Description ==
St Alban's Church is constructed of stone quarried at Atienne and has a slate roof, with a square north-east tower. The interior construction features, chancel with scissor-truss roof and original polychrome application. Carved limestone reredos by Harry Hemes of England designed by Pirie and Clyne, Aberdeen, Scotland. Floor tiles throughout the church were made by Minton and Hollins. Needle point kneelers and cushions were possibly made by early Rector's wife, Mrs Beedle. Chancel arch supported by short shafts and volute corbels. Four bay with south aisle and arcade. Scissor and collar truss with braced principals and polychrome decoration. A complete set of stained glass windows by Howard Bros. of Frome, Somersetshire, England. Original oak pews. Nine shafted carved stone font, built by James Black & Son.

=== Condition ===
As at 13 January 1998, it is Sir George Gilbert Scott's only known design for a church executed in Australia, supervised by J. H. Hunt on behalf of E. Blacket. The Church is a superb example of English, Victorian Gothic Revival. Complete with 19th century plantings, fence and bellcote.

=== Modifications and dates ===
The following modifications have been undertaken to the site:

- 1880s – a fence, believed to be designed by John Horbury Hunt was built on the Brook Street and Hunter Terrace boundaries.
- 1886 – further maintenance works undertaken: whole exterior of church's stonework was re=pointed and the fence repainted.
- 1893 – roof repair works and guttering on the tower. Organ reubilt by Sydney organ builder, Charles Richardson, keeping some of the original facade and Walker pipes.
- 1894 – gas lighting installed by Muswellbrook Gas Co.
- late 19th century – termite damage led to replacing some floor boards and foundations below pulpit re-laid.
- 1913 – re-roofing carried out in slate for the roof and copper for the church spire. Stone work repointed.
- 1914 – Archdeacon White memorial clock with chiming bells installed in church tower, detached stand-alone belfry/bellcote/bell tower of timber erected in the church yard to house original church bell (from 1843 church, transferred to new one in 1869). Vestry enlarged on north-west side of tower, moving the wall approx. 1.2 metres (4 ft) with sandstone of the same quality as the original and workmanship similar. The only style departure was using copper gutter and downpiping and diamond lead-lighting with clear glass with red border around the edges of the window.
- mid-1980s – Belfry/belcote/bell tower - major maintenance works done in the mid-1980s based on a 1979 Donald Ellsmore Report.

== Heritage listing ==
St Alban's Anglican Church was listed on the New South Wales State Heritage Register on 2 April 1999.

== See also ==
- Australian non-residential architectural styles
- List of Anglican churches in New South Wales
