= The Muswellbrook Chronicle and Upper Hunter advertiser =

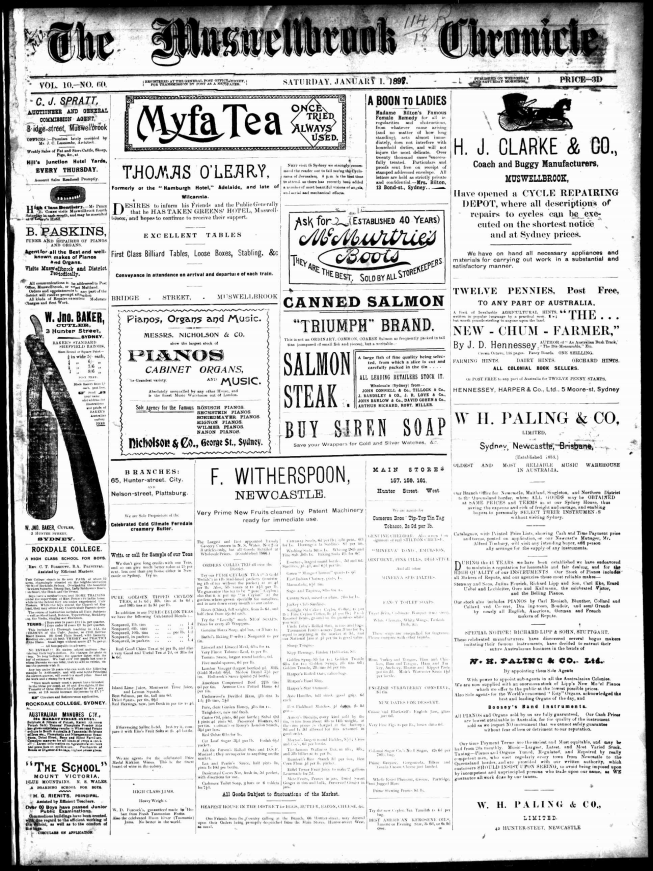
Muswellbrook Chronicle, 1 January 1898

The Muswellbrook Chronicle and Upper Hunter advertiser is a newspaper published in Muswellbrook, New South Wales, Australia since 1872. It has also been published as Muswellbrook chronicle, Muswellbrook & Denman, Upper Hunter regional show, and Hunter unlimited.

== History ==
The Muswellbrook Chronicle can trace its origin back to 1868 when it was called The Muswellbrook Monitor, this was then followed by the Courier, published from 1872 to 1876 and continued by the Upper Hunter Standard from 1876 to 1888. This subsequently gave way to the Muswellbrook Chronicle, which was established in August 1888 by Pierce Healy.

== Digitisation ==
The paper has been digitised as part of the Australian Newspapers Digitisation Program project of the National Library of Australia.

== See also ==
- List of newspapers in Australia
- List of newspapers in New South Wales
