= Muswellbrook Post Office =

- Location within New South Wales
- 32.2649°S 150.8890°E
- Location: 7 Bridge Street, Muswellbrook, New South Wales, Australia

Site notes
- Architect(s): Alexander Dawson, James Barnet

Commonwealth Heritage List
- Official name: Muswellbrook Post Office
- Type: Listed place (Historic)
- Designated: 08 November 2011
- Reference no.: 106128

Muswellbrook Post Office is a heritage-listed post office at 7 Bridge Street, Muswellbrook, New South Wales, Australia. It was added to the Australian Commonwealth Heritage List on 8 November 2011.

== History ==
The Muswellbrook Post Office was erected in two stages. The first section (to the rear of the site) was constructed as a post or telegraph office in 1861, possibly by Colonial Architect Alexander Dawson. The second portion of the building was designed by Dawson's successor as Colonial Architect, James Barnet, and erected in 1885. The building contained both a post and a telegraph office by 1878. The telegraph office continued for a time in the 1861 building after the present post office in front of it was completed. The 1880s works also included upstairs quarters.

== Description ==
Muswellbrook Post Office is at 7 Bridge Street, Muswellbrook, comprising the whole of Lot 17 DP758740.

Muswellbrook had both a post and a telegraph office by 1878. This appears to have been in an 1861 building at the rear of the present post office building fronting Bridge Street, which was constructed in 1883–85. The whole 1861–1885 fabric is taken as being the original complex for purposes of this survey. The telegraph office continued for a time in the 1861 building after the present post office in front of it was completed. The combined buildings have three distinct components. Maisy Stapleton's 1981 roof plan, included with the original submission for the Register of the National Estate, shows the current post office as an oblong mass fronting Bridge Street with a return verandah to the west and south. Behind that are two more blocks, listed as "rendered outbuildings" and linked by covered walkways. These appear to be the 1861–1878 fabric.

Details of construction and form largely relate to the 1883–85 component. This was two storied, possibly with a stucco rendered exterior (resprayed in 1968 with a sprayed concrete finish). The roof is hipped, evidently timber-framed, and is clad with corrugated colorbond, and supported on a broad eave with planking soffits. One chimney is visible from the street: it has a cornice and the stack has a sprayed concrete finish with the high points screed off. The chimney has four terracotta pots. The original roof is a double-hip form, which drains to a rainhead under the rear eaves. Fabric indicates that another rainhead may have been removed, and its downpipe connected to the upper gutter. The post office at Scone still uses this method of disposal of rainwater from box gutters. The verandah roof is shed- framed and clad in corrugated colorbond, supported on a set of octagonal, tapered posts. There is a verandah frieze in a floral pattern which resembles cast iron lace but is actually in fretted timber. The verandah also has an Italianate railing with waisted balusters in cast iron. The verandah base is coursed and rendered. The floor has modern, non slip tiles, over concrete. There is a flagpole fitted to one of the verandah posts.

The walls have a sprayed concrete finish and there are wide bracketed sills to the windows. The simple rendered arches have been overcoated. The windows are double hung, with scotia horns and a light arch effect in the top rail of the upper sash.

Fenestration is in a broadly symmetrical pattern, apart from a single window on the ground floor. These windows all have segmental heads with prominent drip mouldings on both floors, and bracketed sills. The frames are double-hung sashes with single panes. On the first floor the three central windows facing Bridge Street are clustered in a trio, and this is matched on the ground floor by a central set of windows, of similar width to the upstairs window trio. Entry is by two sets of steps at each end of the verandah, and by a pedestrian ramp on the north side. The pattern of two flanking windows on the Bridge Street frontage at the first floor is matched by corresponding window placement on the south end of the ground floor. But a door and window to the north side are relocated off symmetry. Window placement to the south elevation is regular, though the south side extension simply continues the first floor course line as a parapet, and encompasses two small parcel room windows at its rear. The encircling verandah gives the two-storey design a "through-the-roof" appearance.

Various unspecified repairs were made in 1890 and 1895. A car port-garage was added at the rear of the 1861–78 blocks. It has the appearance of 1950s construction, with a stud frame and rusticated weatherboards. The store room for bikes has a concrete floor and a roller shutter. The principal alterations, though, appear to have been in reassigning spaces in the former post office buildings of 1861–78. These currently house two storerooms, a lunch room, a postmen's area, a contractors' room, male toilets and locker room, cleaner's room, foyer, two verandahs and a bike shed. The upstairs quarters of 1883–85 have been refitted to provide a lunch room, a postal manager's office, cleaner's room, tea room and store, though the valuation report still lists this area as 'an old manager's residence including two bedrooms, a study, bathroom and kitchen, and also lists executive-style office suites as being in the building. There is no upstairs bathroom.

In the 1980s the ground floor of the 1883–85 block became a long transverse retail space and after 2004, two counters were formed with joinery and partitions. The entry doors are to each end, and the main retail entry door has been replaced with a reproduction, four-panel timber / glass door. The main chamber has a retailing "overlay" which retains large openings at each end, under raked ceilings. They have fluted reveals, and chamfered, square dressed architraves. All ceilings are plasterboard with scotia cornices. A fireplace is concealed by the display. There are two counters, one formed by joinery, and the other framed by a large opening to the rear wall. The square heads of the windows are visible at the sides. Architraves are an ogee pattern and all joinery is painted. The flooring is carpet over timber.

Behind the main chamber is a corridor. It leads to a storeroom with a lower floor level and a concrete step. It was originally an open verandah facing the south driveway, and has remnant external wall finishes. The room has two modern fixed glass windows, and a plasterboard ceiling with scotia cornice. The flooring is carpet over concrete. There is also a unisex toilet.

Behind the second counter, is an area with a lower floor, plasterboard ceiling, carpet floor and a door, which leads to the rear post box filling room.

The large rear room provides access to a mail sorting room for filling the front suite of postal boxes. The ceiling is raked, and is lined with plasterboard and a scotia cornice. The flooring is carpet. The larger room has similar finishes, and with rendered walls, carpet floor and vinyl skirting. There is a flush panel door to the central rear office. It has a threshold under the carpet, indicating that it was once an external wall of the larger rear pavilion.

A rubber-floored ramp leads to the east, to the rear pavilion, which contains a large sorting room. It has a carpet on timber floor, vinyl skirting, and a plasterboard ceiling and scotia cornice. Walls are rendered and there is a flush panel exit door.

The rear office is one of two rooms contained within the smaller pavilion. A fireplace is partly obscured some of its tiling is evident. The other room is a staff room. The fireplace is sealed and the chimney breast has chamfered corners.

The contractors' room has door which leads to the "truckport" outside. The room has a vinyl floor on concrete, which is probably contributing to the deterioration of the stone plinth. The concrete floor is at a lower level than the main sorting room, and is reached via a short ramp. Walls are rendered, and the sheet ceiling has half-round cover strips. The room leads to a small sorting room, located in a former verandah which has been enclosed. The original outer wall is ashlar scored.

The stairwell retains the original timber stair (painted) with vinyl covered, tapered treads. Balusters and newel posts are turned, and the stringers are plain. All doors are four panel, with inlaid mouldings, pivoted transoms and ogee architraves. Two double hung windows have no glazing bars.

The staff (lunch) room has double hung timber framed windows to both the front and south elevations. There is a distinctive cast iron fireplace with an elaborately carved timber surround. The ceiling is strapped, and has a timber scotia cornice. There is a vinyl floor and skirting, covering the painted ogee skirting. The rear office is similar to the staff room and has a similar fire surround, but fitted with a less decorative fire insert. A small room off the landing has similar finishes and timber shelves installed.

Returning to the ground floor, the mail room spaces are located to the north side of the building and partway along the rear, around an inset general office, strong room, male toilet, stair and parcel room. The PO boxes were relocated along the entire north side of the front building, with a cranked walkway under a stepped awning roof. The postal boxes are fitted into timber framed walls sitting on modern raked brick which has been painted. Above the boxes are fixed windows. The verandah has a raked, sheeted ceiling with extruded jointing strips. The verandah roof is supported with tubular steel posts, and extends in a single plane to the upper floor wall above.

A steel-framed covered way leads to the demountable building further back along the north side. Opposite the demountable are the two pavilions, joined with a matching "infill" wall, which has been ashlar scored to match the finish of the pavilions. These walls retain their unpainted finish and the larger of the two pavilions is sited atop a coursed sandstone plinth.

At the south east corner of the site is large "truckport" serving the contractors' room and access to the staff facilities. It partly covers overlaps the roofs of the two early pavilions, which have hipped roofs of corrugated steel. There is a battery charging room off a rear access door.

At the rear, a concreted plant area was set out at the south east corner of the 1883–85 block. Washing facilities are at the rear of the 1861–78 blocks, housed in the weatherboard skillion and the back yard has been concreted. The driveway is brick paved.

=== Condition ===
The building is in good condition despite the changes in use and the building's age. Some cracking has occurred, and there is evidence of salt damp to the sandstone plinth and on north walls. Effects of rising damp are evident in other areas.

The main building is linked by a ramped access to a second pavilion. The link between the two is roofed in skillion forms. A further pavilion at the rear is connected by a skillion roof and matching infill rendered wall. Verandahs have been added or absorbed within later development. A weatherboard "lean to" is added at the rear. There is a weatherboard garage building, and a "Terrapin" demountable building with a covered link to the west side of the main building.

== Heritage listing ==
Muswellbrook Post Office, constructed in two stages in 1861 and 1885, comprises two buildings: a smaller structure to the rear of the site (1861), and a two-storey 1880s building facing Bridge Street. It is a rare example of the survival of two postal buildings on one site, both more than a century old, and designed and built for the same purpose, but of different generations and styles.

The significant components of Muswellbrook Post Office include the main 1861–1885 post office complex.

Muswellbrook Post Office was listed on the Australian Commonwealth Heritage List on 8 November 2011 having satisfied the following criteria.

Criterion A: Processes

Muswellbrook Post Office comprises two buildings: a smaller structure to the rear of the site (1861), and a two-storey 1880s building facing Bridge Street. It is a rare example of the survival of two postal buildings on one site, both more than a century old, and designed and built for the same purpose, but of different generations and styles. The buildings have the potential to contribute to an understanding of two different stages of the development of postal operations in regional NSW.

The significant components of Muswellbrook Post Office include the main 1861–1885 post office complex.

Criterion D: Characteristic values

Muswellbrook Post Office is an example of:

- A first generation typology Post Office (1803–1869), with a later larger Post office and telegraph office with quarters (second generation typology 1870–1929)
- Residential/domestic-style Victorian design by Alexander Dawson (1861) and James Barnet (1885)

Muswellbrook Post Office combines characteristics of the first (1803–1869) and second (1870–1929) typologies. The building is largely intact to its various phases of construction. While aspects of the original planning and detail have been impacted by changes of use, works and additions and a sprayed concrete finish to the exterior walls, the building is still visibly a Victorian-era civic building with the principal post office components.

Architecturally and stylistically, the building's distinctive domestic character is unusual in both its mid-late Victorian period of construction, and in the work of James Barnet. It is possible that the aesthetic of the earlier building informed the form and detailing of the later building. In other circumstances, a different character might have been expected for a prominent civic building in a by-then prospering and established regional centre. The timber verandah is a rare surviving example from the late Victorian period. It is also evidence of Barnet's distaste for cast iron ornament. The buildings are also distinguished by a domestic character and "Old Colonial" simplicity.

Criterion G: Social value

Socially the two buildings have local significance to the Muswellbrook community for being components of the commercial hub of the town over a sustained period.
