= Denman Shire =

Former local government area in New South Wales, Australia

Denman Shire New South Wales
- Established: 7 March 1906
- Abolished: 1 July 1979
- Council seat: Muswellbrook
- Region: Hunter

Denman Shire was a local government area in the Hunter region of New South Wales, Australia.

Denman Shire was proclaimed (as Wybong Shire) on 7 March 1906, one of 134 shires created after the passing of the Local Government (Shires) Act 1905. It was renamed Muswellbrook Shire on 6 March 1907. It was not until 10 April 1968 that the area was renamed Denman Shire.

The shire office was in Muswellbrook. Other towns and villages in the shire included Denman and Sandy Hollow.

Denman Shire merged with the Municipality of Muswellbrook to form a new Muswellbrook Shire on 1 July 1979.
