= Municipality of Muswellbrook =

- Local government area
- Country: Australia
- State: New South Wales
- Region: Hunter
- Established: 13 April 1870
- Abolished: 1 July 1979
- Council seat: Muswellbrook

Government
  - Mayor: John Hughes Jobling (1974–1979)

The Municipality of Muswellbrook was a local government area located in the Hunter Region of New South Wales, Australia.

The Municipality of Muswellbrook was established on 13 April 1870. It was established as the 'Municipality of Musclebrook', but later changed its name to Muswellbrook.

The Municipality of Muswellbrook was abolished on 1 July 1979, when it merged with Denman Shire to form Muswellbrook Shire.
