= Muswellbrook Shire =

- Local government area
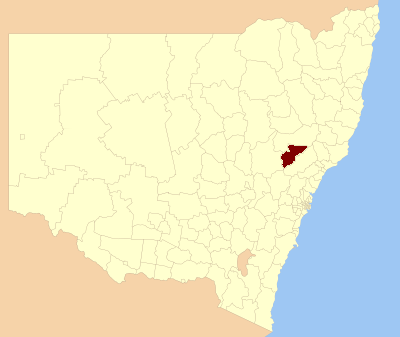
- Location in New South Wales
- Interactive map of Muswellbrook Shire
- Coordinates: 32°16′S 150°54′E
- Country: Australia
- State: New South Wales
- Region: Hunter
- Established: 1 July 1979
- Council seat: Muswellbrook

Government
  - Mayor: Jeffrey Drayton
  - State electorate: Upper Hunter
  - Federal division: New England

Area
  - Total: 3,405 km^{2} (1,315 sq mi)

Population
  - Total: 16,357 (2021 census)
  - Density: 4.8038/km^{2} (12.4418/sq mi)
- Time zone: UTC+10 (AEST)
  - Summer (DST): UTC+11 (AEDT)
- Website: Muswellbrook Shire
LGAs around Muswellbrook Shire
Upper Hunter	Upper Hunter	Upper Hunter
Mid-Western	Muswellbrook Shire	Singleton
Mid-Western	Singleton	Singleton

Muswellbrook Shire is a local government area in the Upper Hunter region of New South Wales, Australia. The Shire is situated adjacent to the New England Highway and the Hunter railway line.

Muswellbrook Shire was established on 1 July 1979 from the amalgamation of the Municipality of Muswellbrook with the adjacent Denman Shire, which had been called Muswellbrook Shire between 1907 and 1968.

The mayor of the Muswellbrook Shire Council is Cr. Jeffrey Drayton.

== Main towns and villages ==
The Shire includes Muswellbrook, Denman, Baerami, McCullys Gap, Martindale, Muscle Creek, Sandy Hollow, Widden and Wybong.

== Coal mining ==
Muswellbrook started as coal mining town in late 1800s and began open cut mining in 1944. The oldest coal was opened in 1906.

== Heritage listings ==
The Muswellbrook Shire has a number of heritage-listed sites, including:

- Denman, 4883 Jerrys Plains Road: Merton
- Muswellbrook, Denman Road: Rous Lench
- Muswellbrook, 132 Bridge Street: Weidmann Cottage
- Muswellbrook, 142–144 Bridge Street: Loxton House
- Muswellbrook, 178, 180–188 Bridge Street: Eatons Group
- Muswellbrook, 710 Denman Road: Edinglassie
- Muswellbrook, Hunter Terrace: St Alban's Anglican Church
- Muswellbrook, Main Northern railway: Muswellbrook railway station

== Demographics ==
At the 2011 census, there were 15,791 people in the Muswellbrook Shire local government area, of these 51.7 per cent were male and 48.3 per cent were female. Aboriginal and Torres Strait Islander people made up 5.4 per cent of the population, which was significantly higher than the national and state averages of 2.5 per cent. The median age of people in the Muswellbrook Shire was 34 years, which was lower than the national median of 37 years. Children aged 0–14 years made up 22.8 per cent of the population and people aged 65 years and over made up 10.6 per cent of the population. Of people in the area aged 15 years and over, 47.0 per cent were married and 11.8 per cent were either divorced or separated.

Population growth in the Muswellbrook Shire between the 2001 census and the 2006 census was 3.25 per cent; and in the subsequent five years to the 2011 census, population growth was 3.64 per cent. When compared with total population growth of Australia for the same periods, being 5.78 per cent and 8.32 per cent respectively, population growth in the Muswellbrook Shire local government area was approximately half the national average. The median weekly income for residents within the Muswellbrook Shire was marginally higher than the national average.

At the 2011 census, the proportion of residents in the Muswellbrook Shire local government area who stated their ancestry as Australian or Anglo-Saxon exceeded 81 per cent of all residents (national average was 65.2 per cent). In excess of 68% of all residents in the Muswellbrook Shire nominated a religious affiliation with Christianity at the 2011 census, which was considerably higher than the national average of 50.2 per cent. Meanwhile, as at the census date, compared to the national average, households in the Muswellbrook Shire local government area had a significantly lower than average proportion (4.3 per cent) where two or more languages are spoken (national average was 20.4 per cent); and a significantly higher proportion (89.7 per cent) where English only was spoken at home (national average was 76.8 per cent).

Selected historical census data for the Muswellbrook Shire local government area
Census year		2001	2006	2011
Population	Estimated residents on Census night	14,756	15,236	15,791
Population	LGA rank in terms of size within New South Wales			
Population	% of New South Wales population			0.23%
Population	% of Australian population	0.08%	0.08%	▼0.07%
Cultural and language diversity				
Ancestry, top responses	Australian			36.2%
Ancestry, top responses	English			30.4%
Ancestry, top responses	Irish			8.1%
Ancestry, top responses	Scottish			6.6%
Ancestry, top responses	German			2.9%
Language, top responses (other than English)	Shona	n/c	n/c	▲0.2%
Language, top responses (other than English)	Cantonese	0.1%	0.1%	▲0.2%
Language, top responses (other than English)	Italian	0.1%	0.1%	0.1%
Language, top responses (other than English)	Thai	n/c	▲0.1%	0.1%
Language, top responses (other than English)	Mandarin	n/c	▲0.1%	0.1%
Religious affiliation				
Religious affiliation, top responses	Anglican	40.3%	▼37.5%	▼35.6%
Religious affiliation, top responses	Catholic	28.0%	▼27.7%	▼26.1%
Religious affiliation, top responses	No Religion	7.6%	▲11.0%	▲13.9%
Religious affiliation, top responses	Uniting Church	5.2%	▼4.4%	▼3.9%
Religious affiliation, top responses	Presbyterian and Reformed	3.8%	▼3.2%	▼3.1%
Median weekly incomes				
Personal income	Median weekly personal income		A$453	A$619
Personal income	% of Australian median income		97.2%	▲107.3%
Family income	Median weekly family income		A$1,213	A$1,697
Family income	% of Australian median income		103.6%	▲114.6%
Household income	Median weekly household income		A$1,060	A$1,399
Household income	% of Australian median income		103.2%	▲113.4%

== Council ==
=== Current composition and election method ===
Muswellbrook Shire Council is composed of twelve councillors elected proportionally as a single ward. All councillors are elected for a fixed four-year term of office. The mayor is elected by the councillors at the first meeting of the council. The most recent election was held on 11 January 2022 and the makeup of the council is as follows:

Party	Councillors
Independents and Unaligned	12
Total	12

The current Council, elected in 2024, in order of election, is:

Councillor	Party	Notes
Max MORRIS	Independent	
Jeffrey DRAYTON	Independent	Mayor
De-Anne DOUGLAS	Independent	Deputy Mayor
Rohit MAHAJAN	Independent	
Louise DUNN	Independent	
Rod SCHOLES	Independent	
Clare BAILEY	Independent	
Darryl MARSHALL	Independent	
Amanda BARRY	Independent	
Graeme MCNEILL	Independent	
Stephen WARD		
David HARTLEY	Independent	

=== Mayors ===
The following is a list of mayors since the Shire of Denman amalgamated with the Municipality of Muswellbrook to form Muswellbrook Shire Council on 1 July 1979.

Councillor	Party	Term of office
J.H. Jobling	Unaligned	1979–1986
E.I. Wolfgang	Unaligned	1986–1989
I.E. Seymour	Unaligned	1989–1999
J.E. Colvin	Unaligned	1999–2008
Martin Rush	Unaligned	2008–2021
Rod Scholes	Unaligned	2021–2022
Steven Reynolds		2022–2024
Jeffrey Drayton		2024–present
