= Rous Lench, Muswellbrook =

Rous Lench
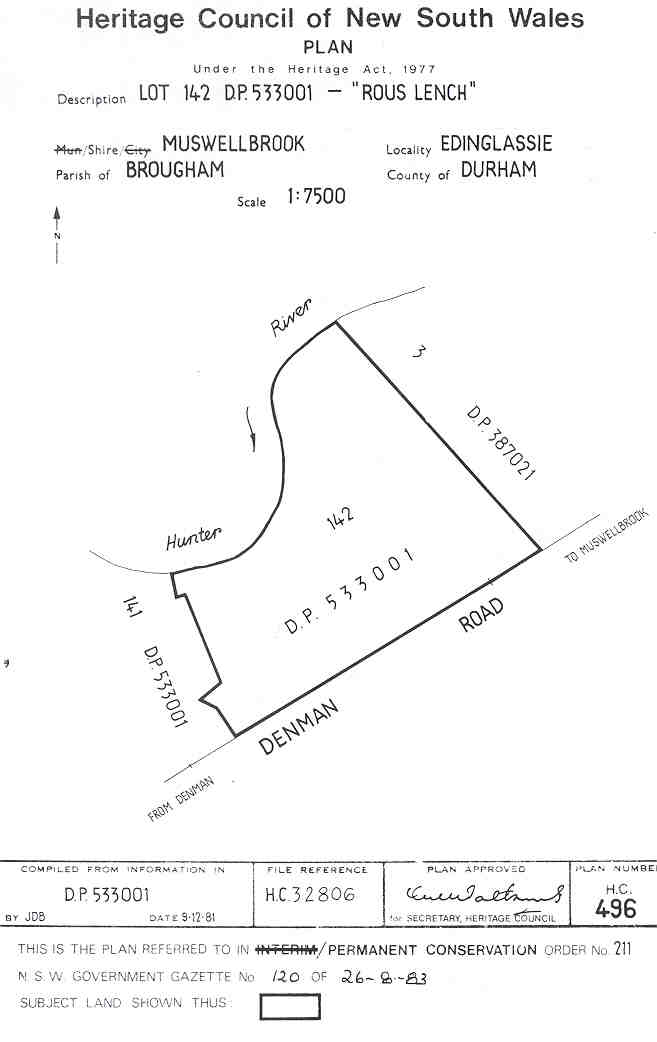
- Heritage boundaries

- Location within New South Wales Location within Australia
- 32°17′52″S 150°50′37″E
- Location: Denman Road, Muswellbrook, Muswellbrook Shire, New South Wales, Australia

History
- Built: 1875–1895

Site notes
- Architect: John Horbury Hunt
- Architectural style: Italianate

New South Wales Heritage Register
- Official name: Rous Lench
- Type: State heritage (landscape)
- Designated: 2 April 1999
- Reference no.: 211
- Type: Homestead Complex
- Category: Farming and Grazing

Rous Lench is a heritage-listed farm and homestead located at Denman Road, Muswellbrook in the Muswellbrook Shire local government area of New South Wales, Australia. It was built from 1875 to 1895. It was added to the New South Wales State Heritage Register on 2 April 1999.

== History ==
The land on which both Edinglassie and Rous Lench are located was the original Portion 4 of the Parish of Brougham in the County of Durham. This comprised an area of 1280 acres the deed of grant for which was issued to George Forbes on 1 August 1839. Like many grants of the period the land had been occupied for many years before it was officially surveyed and the deed grant issued.

The Italianate homestead is a low cottage constructed of rendered brick and corrugated iron featuring a roof ridge extended to form small gables, four panel doors, large four-pane sash windows, panelled ceilings, and gunstock stiles on French windows at the side. A photograph dating from the 1880s showing the first part of Edinglassie adjacent to an earlier hipped roof house indicates that the original house was demolished and/or rebuilt when the present Edinglassie was completed in c. 1895. It is therefore not likely that Rous Lench is the original homestead. The homestead was designed by John Horbury Hunt.

== Description ==
The homestead is a low cottage constructed of rendered brick and corrugated iron featuring a roof ridge extended to form small gables, four panel doors, large four-pane sash windows, panelled ceilings, and gunstock stiles on French windows at the side. A photograph dating from the 1880s showing the first part of Edinglassie adjacent to an earlier hipped roof house indicates that the original house was demolished and/or rebuilt when the present Edinglassie was completed in c. 1895. It is therefore not likely that Rous Lench is the original homestead.

== Heritage listing ==
As at 31 July 2007, the Edinglassie property including the Edinglassie homestead, associated buildings and Rous Lench cottage are closely associated with the earliest European occupation of the area and collectively represent one of the earliest land grants of the initial settlement of the Hunter Valley. The Edinglassie property demonstrates various phases of human activities such as settlement and clearing, water supply and management, sheep and cattle running, development of specialist cattle breeding activities, recreation, viticulture and horse breeding.

The Edinglassie homestead with its associated outbuildings and Rous Lench cottage are good architectural examples of their type and style. The Edinglassie property demonstrates an excellent application of the Arcadian design approach to the siting of structures and elements in the landscape which is rare in the region.

The place is also significant because it is associated with George Forbes, the original grantee, who was one of the "gentry" settlers in the early settlement of the area. It is associated with a prominent family, the Whites, a leading pastoral dynasty, who were synonymous with the opening and development of the region. It illustrates the degree of opulence achieved and lifestyles led by the leading pastoral families in the area. It is associated with a significant Australian architect, John Horbury Hunt.

It is a well known landmark, and has provided a community focus over a number of generations form the turn of the 19th century. It has extant and potential intact archaeological evidence capable of helping interpret past occupation and lifestyles of the area.

The siting of the homestead is intrinsic to its significance.

Rous Lench was listed on the New South Wales State Heritage Register on 2 April 1999.

== See also ==
- Australian residential architectural styles
