= Cloncorrick, Darling Point =

Cloncorrick
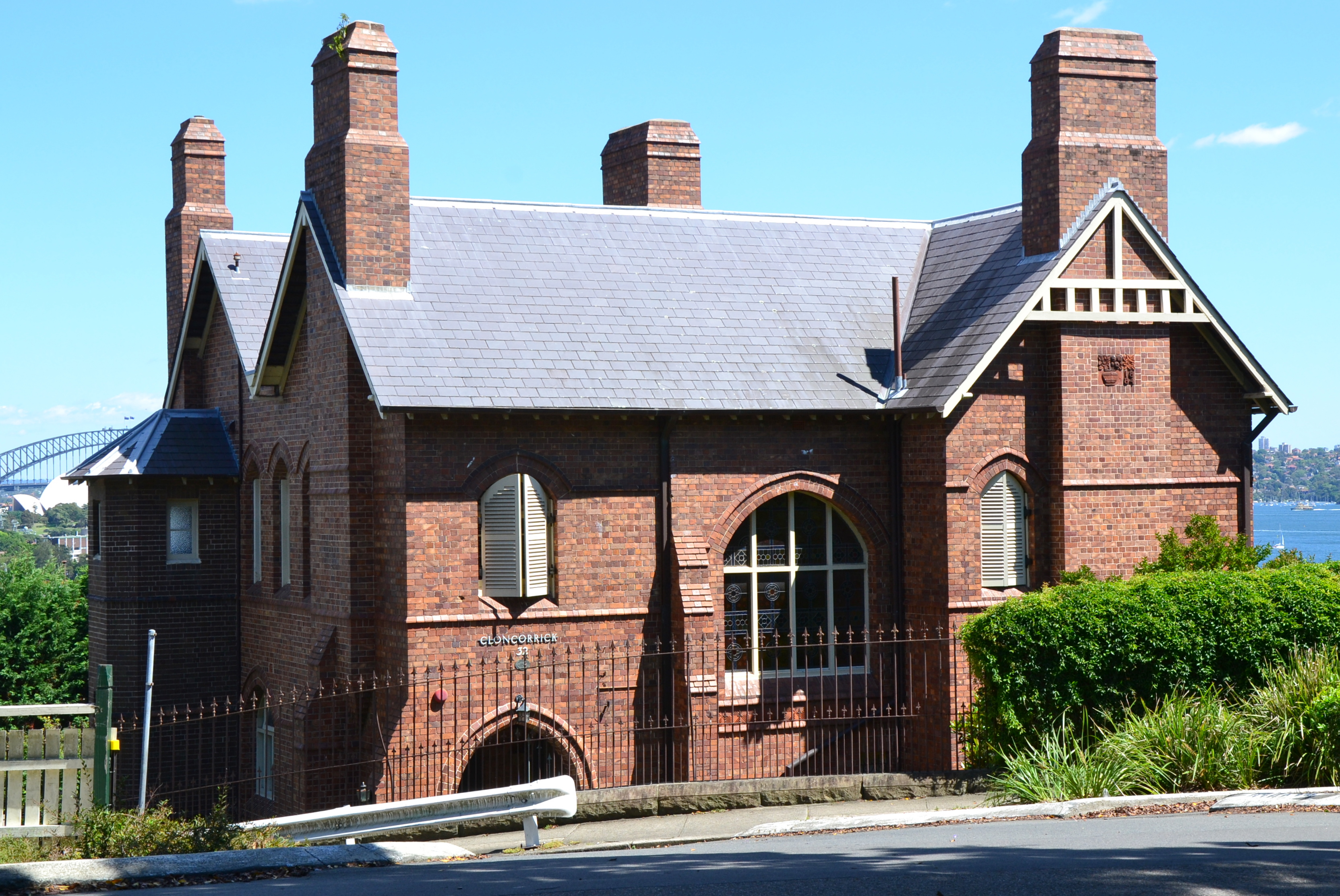
- Cloncorrick, Darling Point

- Location within inner Sydney

General information
- Status: Completed
- Type: House
- Architectural style: Victorian Free Gothic
- Location: 1 Annandale Street, Darling Point, New South Wales, Australia
- Coordinates: 33°52′26″S 151°14′10″E
- Named for: Cloncorrick Castle, Ireland
- Completed: 1884
- Client: Sir George Bowen Simpson

Technical details
- Material: Brick
- Floor count: 3

Design and construction
- Architect: John Horbury Hunt

Register of the National Estate
- Official name: Cloncorrick
- Designated: 21 March 1978
- Part of: St Mark's Church group
- Reference no.: 2480

New South Wales Heritage Database (Local Government Register)
- Official name: Cloncorrick – house, street fencing
- Type: Built
- Criteria: a., c., f., g.
- Designated: 10 March 1995
- Reference no.: Local register

Cloncorrick is a heritage-listed house located in Darling Point, a suburb of Sydney, in New South Wales, Australia. It was built in 1884 for Sir George Bowen Simpson to a design by John Horbury Hunt in the Victorian Free Gothic style. Simpson named the house after Cloncorrick Castle in Ireland, where his grandfather once lived. The home was the residence of several notable Australians and is considered to be a house of local historic significance. It has been converted into two apartments.

== Heritage listing ==
On 2 April 1999 was listed on the Woollahra Council local government list of the New South Wales Heritage Database with the following statement of significance:

The site at Darling Point is significant as part of the original grant to Thomas Barker in 1835. Cloncorrick has historic and social significance as an early residence in the district constructed for local identity Hon. George Simpson, and for the part it has played in the development of the district. It has historic significance for its long association with the Simpson Family. Hon. G. Simpson resided here until 1906 and Lady Simpson resided at Cloncorrick from 1922 into the mid twentieth century. Cloncorrick has high historic and architectural significance as designed by the American architect John Horbury Hunt for the Hon. George Simpson. It has architectural and aesthetic significance for its prominence and stylistic detailing, and as a relatively intact example of a Victorian Free Gothic home. The building is a dominant element in the landscape and contributes strongly to the character and quality of the area.

— Statement of significance, New South Wales Heritage Database.

== Owners ==
=== Sir George and Lady Simpson ===
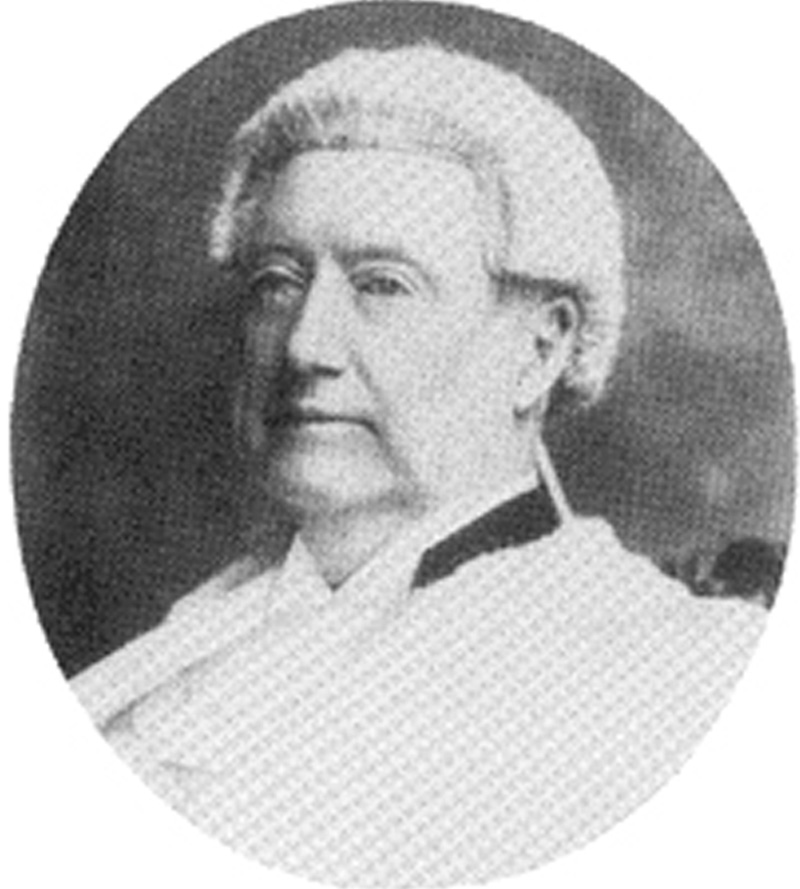
Sir George Bowen Simpson, c. 1900.

George Bowen Simpson was born in 1838 near Parramatta. His father was Pierce Simpson, a police magistrate, and his mother was Hester Elizabeth MacNeill. George was educated at Kings School, Parramatta, and was admitted to the bar in 1858.

In 1861 Simpson married Martha Margaret Cobcroft, who was the daughter of Enoch Cobcroft of Cumberland Hall, East Maitland. The couple had two children, a boy and a girl; both died when they were young. The daughter was only fifteen when she died and the son was 34. They had no immediate heirs.

Simpson became a very successful lawyer and in 1867 was made a district court judge. In 1885 he became a politician in the New South Wales Legislative Council and soon became attorney-general. In 1894 he became a judge of the Supreme Court. In 1909 he was knighted but because of poor health he retired in 1910. He spent his remaining years at Cloncorrick, and he died in 1915.

His wife Martha continued to live at Cloncorrick after his death. One of her main interests was the work done at St Mark's Church, Darling Point. After she died at age 90 in 1933 a memorial plaque was erected in memory of both Sir George and Lady Simpson at St Mark's Church, which can still be seen today.

Because they had no immediate heirs, their grandson Julian Simpson inherited the estate, and he sold Cloncorrick in 1934 to Esther Holt.

=== Esther Jane Holt ===
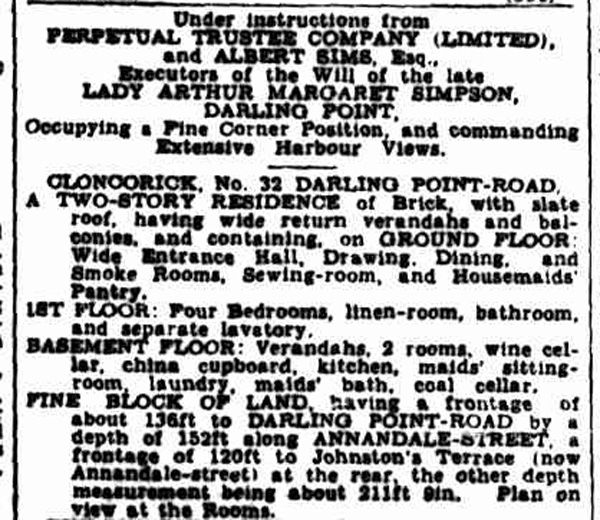
Advertisement in a newspaper for the sale of Cloncorrick in 1933.

Esther Jane Holt was the widow of Walter Henry Holt, a former wealthy pastoralist who had died in 1916. Esther had been born in Wales in 1867; her maiden name was Davies. She married Walter Holt in 1892 and the couple had lived at Glanwyre in Manly, which was a very large mansion and estate. They had four children, the eldest of whom was Sophia. When Walter died, Esther subdivided the Glanwyre estate and therefore had a substantial amount of money.

When Esther bought Cloncorrick in 1934, the house was described in the real estate advertisement in the following terms:

A two story (plus basement) residence of brick with slate roof having wide return verandahs and balconies and containing on the ground floor a wide entrance hall, drawing, dining and smoke rooms, sewing room and housemaids’ pantry. On the first floor there are four bedrooms, linen room and bathroom and separate lavatory. On the basement floor there are verandahs, wine cellar, china cupboard, kitchen maids sitting room, laundry, maids’ bath and coal cellar.

Esther’s daughter Sophia had married Aubrey Curtis, a Queensland pastoralist but unfortunately he died in 1927, leaving her a widow. When Ester bought Cloncorrick, Sophia lived with her mother for some years. Esther died at Cloncorrick in 1948, aged 81. In her will she left a substantial donation to St Mark's Church, Darling Point, and also to several other charities.

=== Herbert and Meredith Lloyd ===
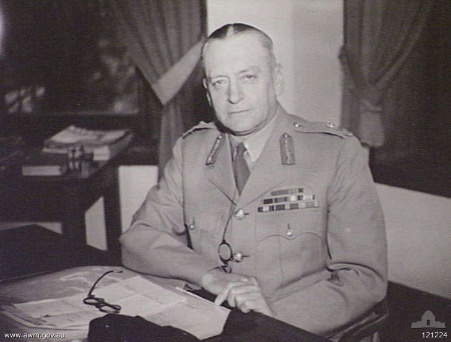
Major General Herbert William Lloyd 1945

Herbert William Lloyd was born in 1883 in South Yarra, Melbourne. His father, William, was a police officer. He was educated at Wesley College, and in 1910 he joined the military forces. Lloyd married Meredith Pleasents in May 1914. Meredith was born in 1890 in Euroa, Victoria. She was the daughter of William Benjamin Pleasents and Ada Pleasents (née Watt).

A few months after they were married, the First World War began and Lloyd went to Egypt. In the following year he was at Gallipoli, where he was promoted to the rank of major. For his conduct during the Gallipoli Campaign he received the DSO. During the rest of the war he was awarded other distinctions. When the war ended, he remained in the military until 1925. In 1929 he became a politician in the New South Wales Legislative Assembly and remained there until 1941.

When the Second World War commenced, Lloyd again entered the military forces and this time was promoted to major general. In 1946, after the war, he retired. Shortly before his retirement his son Mick Lloyd married at St Mark's Church, Darling Point, and a photo of his wedding was in the Australian Women’s Weekly.

After his retirement Herbert became a resident of Cloncorrick, and his wife, Meredith, died there in 1952. After her death Lloyd continued to live at the house for some time. In 1957 he died at the age of 74. He was cremated with Anglican rites and military honours.

== See also ==
- Australian residential architectural styles
- List of historic houses in New South Wales
