= Eatons Group =

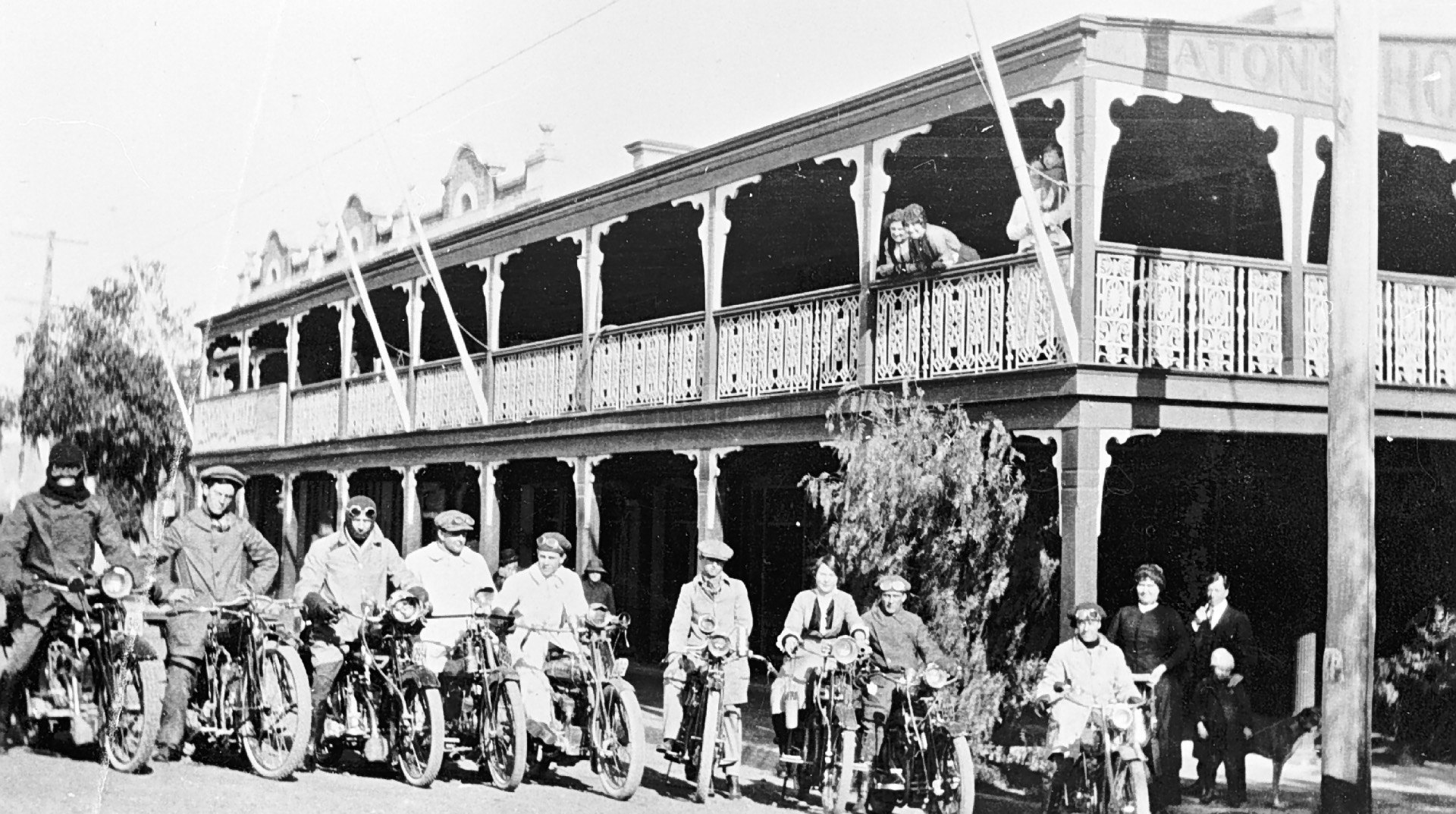
- Members of the Newcastle Motor Cycle Club outside Eaton's Hotel in Muswellbrook, circa 1918

- Location within New South Wales Location within Australia
- 32°15′35″S 150°53′20″E
- Location: 178, 180–188 Bridge Street, Muswellbrook, Muswellbrook Shire, New South Wales, Australia

Site notes
- Owner: Ryan Family and St Vincent de Paul Society

New South Wales Heritage Register
- Official name: Eatons Hotel and St Vincent De Paul; Eatons Hotel & St Vincent De Paul Group
- Type: State heritage (built)
- Designated: 2 April 1999
- Reference no.: 331
- Type: Hotel, shop, house, retail centre
- Category: Commercial

The Eatons Group is a heritage-listed site that contains a hotel, shop, house and retail centre located at 178, 180–188 Bridge Street, Muswellbrook, Muswellbrook Shire, New South Wales, Australia. It is also known as Eatons Hotel and St Vincent De Paul and Eatons Hotel & St Vincent De Paul Group. The property is privately owned by the Ryan Family and the St Vincent de Paul Society. The site was added to the New South Wales State Heritage Register on 2 April 1999.

== History ==
The first hotel on the site was the timber White Hart Inn which was constructed in 1839. William Eaton purchased the property in 1857 and licensed it as Eaton's White Hart Inn.

In 1866 Eaton made extensive additions and improvements to the hotel most likely in anticipation of the Great North railway line which reached Muswellbrook station in 1869. The name changed to Eaton's Hotel in 1867.

c. 1915 saw the area between the rear wings of the hotel filled in with a small hipped roof inserted between the other roof forms. A further addition was made to the northern side of the hotel, c. 1929. Also evidence suggests that the veranda was most likely widened no later than 1930 when works were carried out to the store/residence.

In 2007 an application was approved for alterations and additions including partial demolition of the single-story brick rear later addition, alternations and modifications to interiors, conservation and refurbishments of interiors and exteriors and construction of the new country style motel suites; completed in 2010.

== Heritage listing ==
The Eatons Group site was listed on the New South Wales State Heritage Register on 2 April 1999.

== See also ==
- Australian non-residential architectural styles
