= Loxton House =

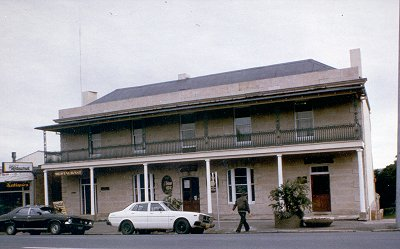

- Location within New South Wales Location within Australia
- 32°15′41″S 150°53′20″E
- Location: 142–144 Bridge Street, Muswellbrook, Muswellbrook Shire, New South Wales, Australia

History
- Built: 1838

New South Wales Heritage Register
- Official name: Loxton House
- Type: State heritage (built)
- Designated: 2 April 1999
- Reference no.: 185
- Type: House
- Category: Residential buildings (private)

Loxton House is a heritage-listed former residence and now restaurant located at 142–144 Bridge Street, Muswellbrook in the Muswellbrook Shire local government area of New South Wales, Australia. It was built in 1838 and was added to the New South Wales State Heritage Register on 2 April 1999.

== History ==
In January 1980 Muswellbrook Council requested comments from the Heritage Council regarding proposed renovations of Loxton House.

In March 1980 the Heritage Council recommended that an Interim Conservation Order be placed over the building as it was concerned that full compliance with Ordinance 70 of the Local Government Act would require an unacceptable sacrifice of the architectural integrity of the building. Non-compliance with the relevant provisions would not unduly affect its fire safety.

Following concurrence with the Minister for Local Government with the proposal an Interim Heritage Order was placed over the building. In recognition of its heritage significance a Permanent Conservation Order was placed over Loxton House on 8 January 1982. It was transferred to the State Heritage Register on 2 April 1999.

== Description ==
The front facade is stone with projecting quoins and an upper verandah supported on fluted timber columns. The side walls are stuccoed brick and the rear wall is painted brick. The rear elevation also has a two-story verandah. The roof is iron over shingles. Joinery is cedar and floors are pit-sawn timber boards. Internally the building retains much of its original cedar joinery including a staircase with carved handrail.

=== Modifications and dates ===
Major modifications include:

- 1980 – restoration/conversion for use as a restaurant in the basement. Shops on the ground floor and offices on the first floor.
- 1987 – approval granted for repaving of basement courtyard.
- 1992 – approval granted for repair of timber posts and repainting exterior.

== Heritage listing ==
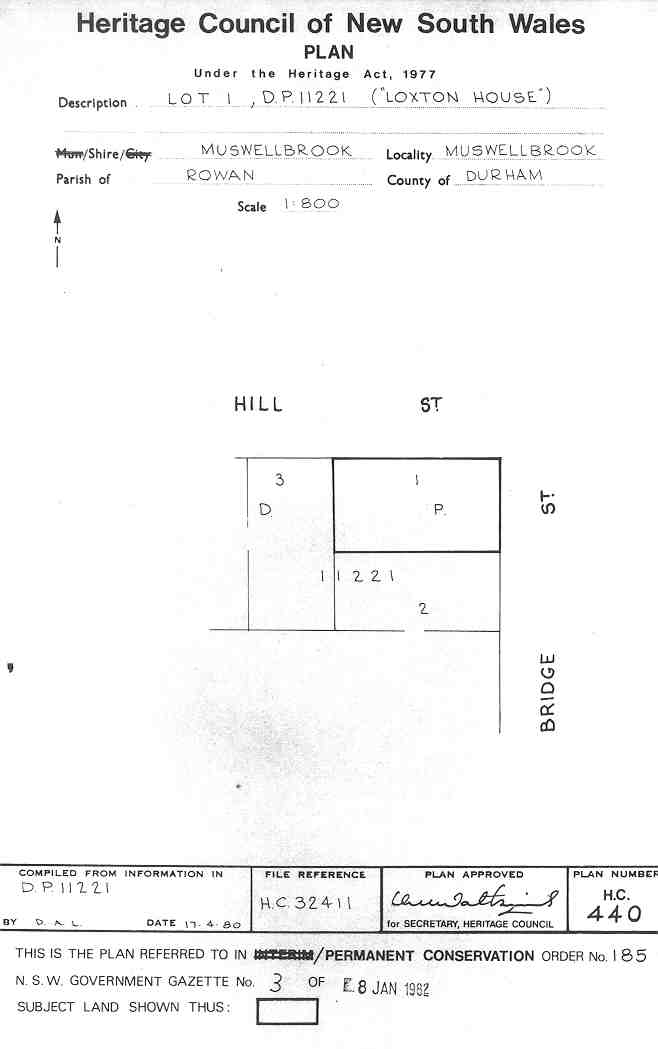
Heritage boundaries

As at 3 October 2000, Loxton House, built c. 1838 is a key building in the main street of Muswellbrook. It is a two-storey Colonial-Georgian building which is believed to be Muswellbrook's oldest remaining building.

Loxton House was listed on the New South Wales State Heritage Register on 2 April 1999.

== See also ==
- Australian residential architectural styles
