= John Horbury Hunt =

Australian architect (1838–1904)

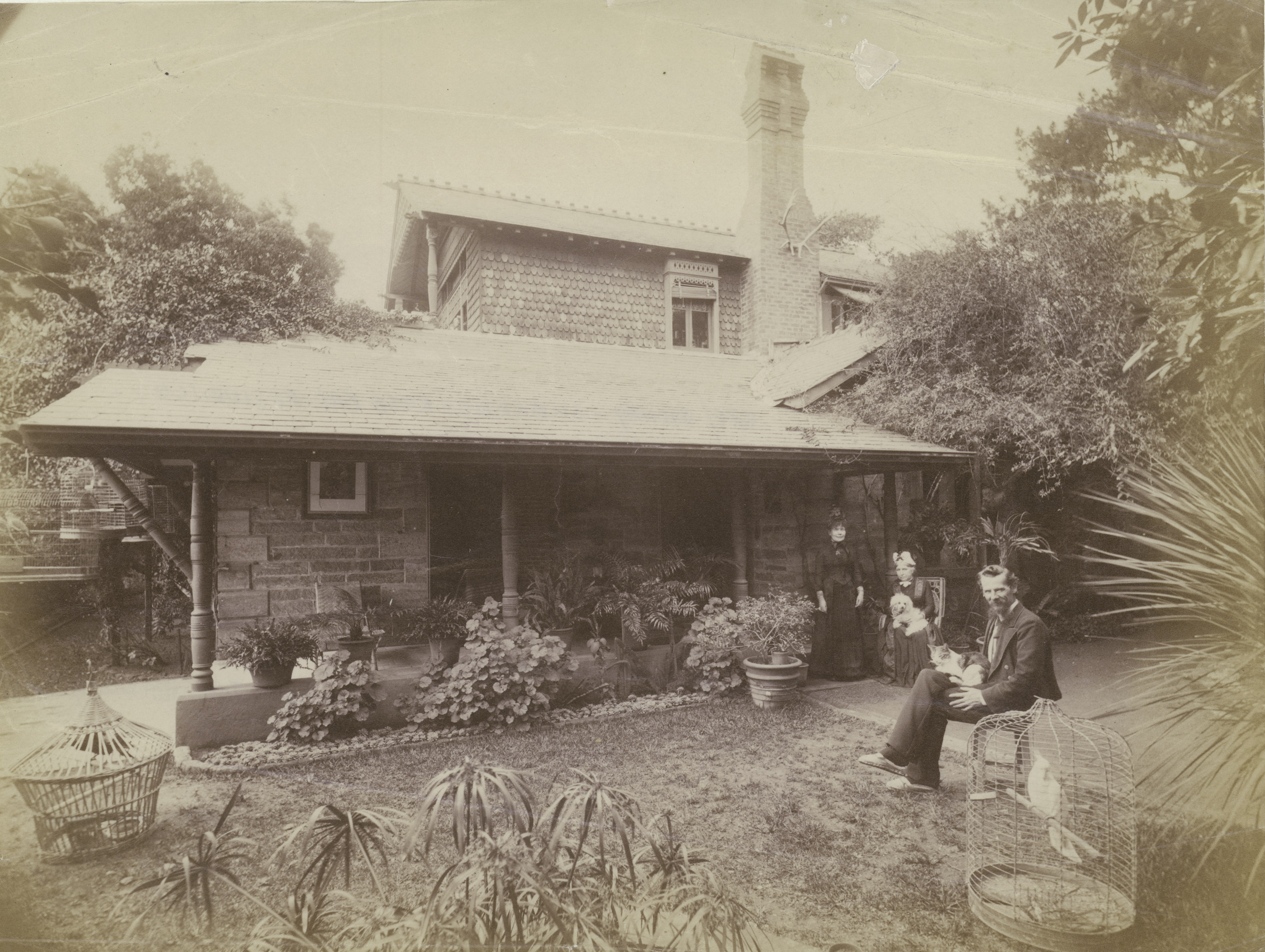
John Horbury Hunt and his wife outside 'Cranbrook Cottage', Bellevue Hill, Sydney

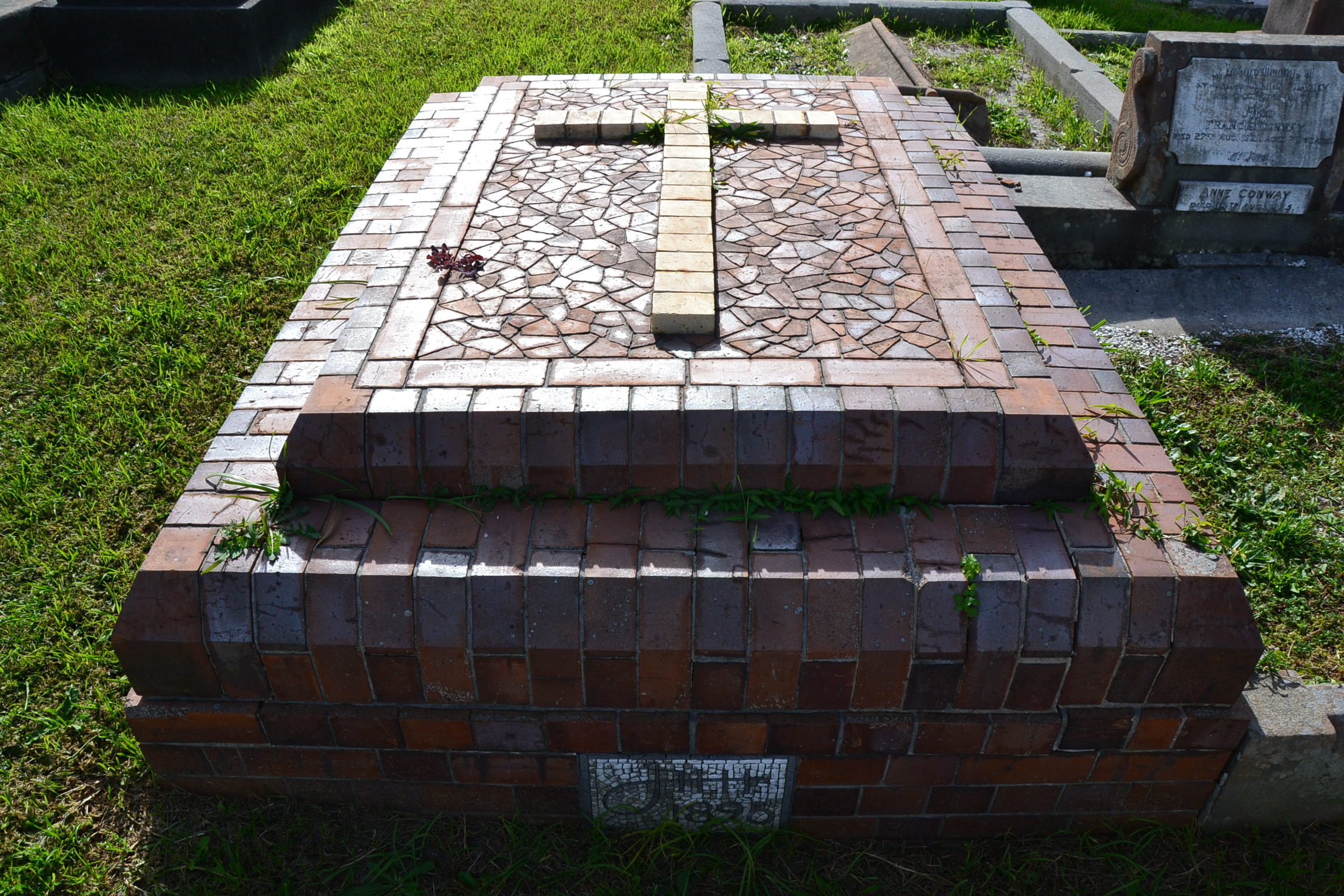
Hunt's grave at South Head Cemetery, Vaucluse, Sydney

John Horbury Hunt (1838 – 30 December 1904), often referred to as Horbury Hunt, was a Canadian-born Australian architect who worked in Sydney and rural New South Wales from 1863.

== Life and career ==
Born in Saint John, New Brunswick, the son of a builder, Hunt was trained in Boston, Massachusetts but then migrated to Australia in 1863. He worked in Sydney with Edmund Blacket for seven years prior to pursuing his own practice. His output was extremely varied and included cathedrals, churches, chapels, houses, homesteads, stables and schools. Probably his first building designed in Australia was the Superintendent's Residence at the Prince of Wales Hospital, Randwick, designed in 1863. A few years later he designed the Catherine Hayes Hospital, which was also built at the Prince of Wales Hospital, with the design modified by Thomas Rowe. Hunt's other works include the Convent of the Sacred Heart, now Kincoppal School, in the Sydney suburb of Vaucluse; and Tivoli, now part of Kambala, in the suburb of Rose Bay. In Armidale, he designed St Peter's Anglican Cathedral and Booloominbah and Trevenna which are now both part of the University of New England.

Hunt's distinctive, radical architecture was considered to be twenty years in advance of his peers, some of it unequalled in the world at that time, and sowed the seeds of some aspects of modern architecture in Australia. It has been said that "Undoubtedly men such as Hunt... have, through their buildings and their ideas, stiffened the intellectual backbone of Australian architecture." He was instrumental in bringing the North American Shingle Style to Australia. The outstanding example of this style was Highlands, a two-storey home designed by Hunt and built for Alfred Hordern in 1891. Situated in Highlands Avenue, Wahroonga, Sydney, Highlands is listed on the Register of the National Estate. Another notable example is Pibrac, designed by Hunt for Frederick Ecclestone du Faur. Pibrac is also on the Register of the National Estate.

Hunt was ruined by the Depression of the 1890s. He died in Royal Prince Alfred Hospital, Camperdown, eleven days after admission suffering from Bright's disease (a kidney disease). His personal effects, recorded in the hospital Admission Book, consisted of a metal box, three gold rings, a silver pencil and a pair of spectacles. He was buried at South Head Cemetery, Vaucluse (the story that he was buried in a tomb with his wife and pet pony is a popular myth).

He was close to destitute at the time of his death. His home, Cranbrook Cottage, had been repossessed by the mortgagor; it was demolished in 1925 to make room for the widening of New South Head Road. The site of the cottage is marked by a small rock garden, named Horbury Hunt Place. Riversdale House in Burradoo, now part of Chevalier College, still survives and is thought to be similar in design to Cranbrook Cottage, having been commissioned by Henry Osborne around the same period (c1875).

== Partial list of works ==
The following buildings designed either in part or in full by Hunt are listed on various national, state and local government heritage registers:

Buildings designed either in part or in full by John Horbury Hunt
Building name	Location	Year completed	Australian National Heritage List	NSW State Heritage Register	Local government register	Notes
All Saints Church	Hunters Hill, Sydney	1885				
Belltrees (shearing shed)	Scone	1907				
Booloominbah	University of New England, Armidale	1883		Yes		
Camelot	Kirkham	1888				
Catherine Hayes Building	Prince of Wales Hospital, Randwick	1867				completed by Thomas Rowe
Cloncorrick	Darling Point, Sydney	1884				
Christ Church Cathedral and Church Hall	Grafton	1881 (cathedral); 1890 (church hall)				
Christ Church Cathedral	Newcastle	1869				
Church of St James	Jerrys Plains	1875				
Church of the Good Shepherd and Rectory	Kangaroo Valley	1870 (church); 1879 (rectory)				
Cranbrook School, Sydney additions	Bellevue Hill, Sydney	1874–75				
Fairwater	Double Bay, Sydney	1881		Yes		
Havilah homestead	Hunter Valley					
Havilah property extensions	Mudgee area	1890				
Highlands	Wahroonga, Sydney	1891				
Osborne Memorial Church of St Luke	Dapto	1882				
Pibrac	Warrawee, Sydney	1888				
Public School	Rozelle, Sydney	1877				
Public School and Headmaster's Residence	Frederickton	1880				
Riversdale House at Chevalier College	Burradoo					designed by Hunt.
Sacred Heart Convent, (now part of Kincoppal School)	Vaucluse, Sydney	1888				
Sir John Robertson Memorial	South Head Cemetery, Sydney					
St Alban's Anglican Church	Muswellbrook	1869		Yes		
St Bartholomew's Church of England, Ollera Station	Guyra	1876				
St James' Anglican Church	Morpeth					partly designed by Hunt.
St Matthias Church	Denman	1871				
St Paul's Church of England	Murrurundi	1872				
St Peter's Anglican Cathedral Church	Armidale	1871				
Superintendent's Cottage, Prince of Wales Hospital	Randwick, Sydney	1863				

== Gallery ==
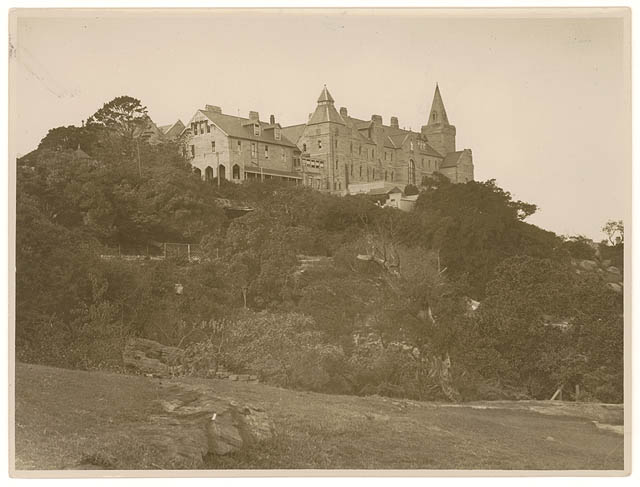
Sacred Heart Convent, c. 1930s, Vaucluse

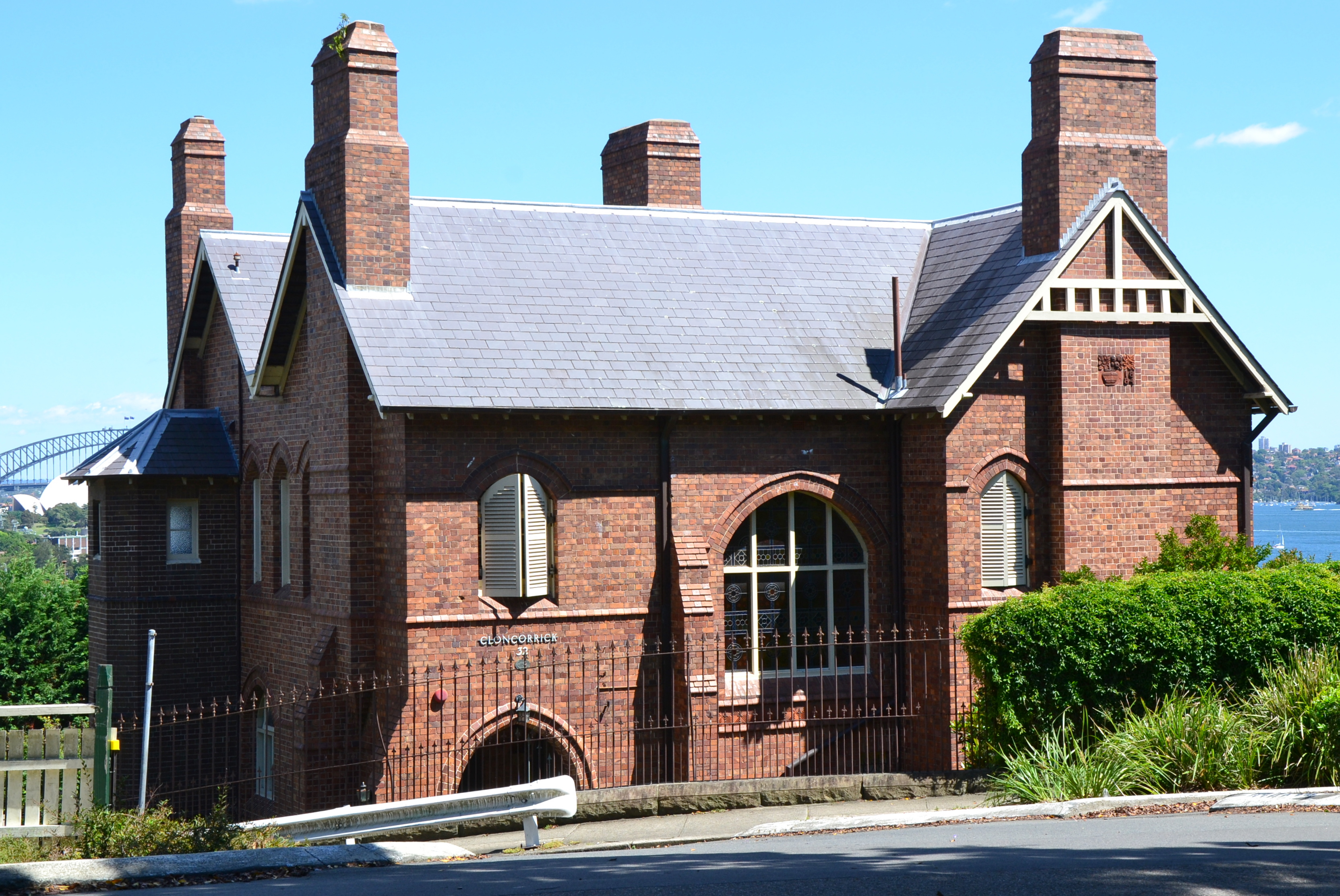
Cloncorrick, Darling Point

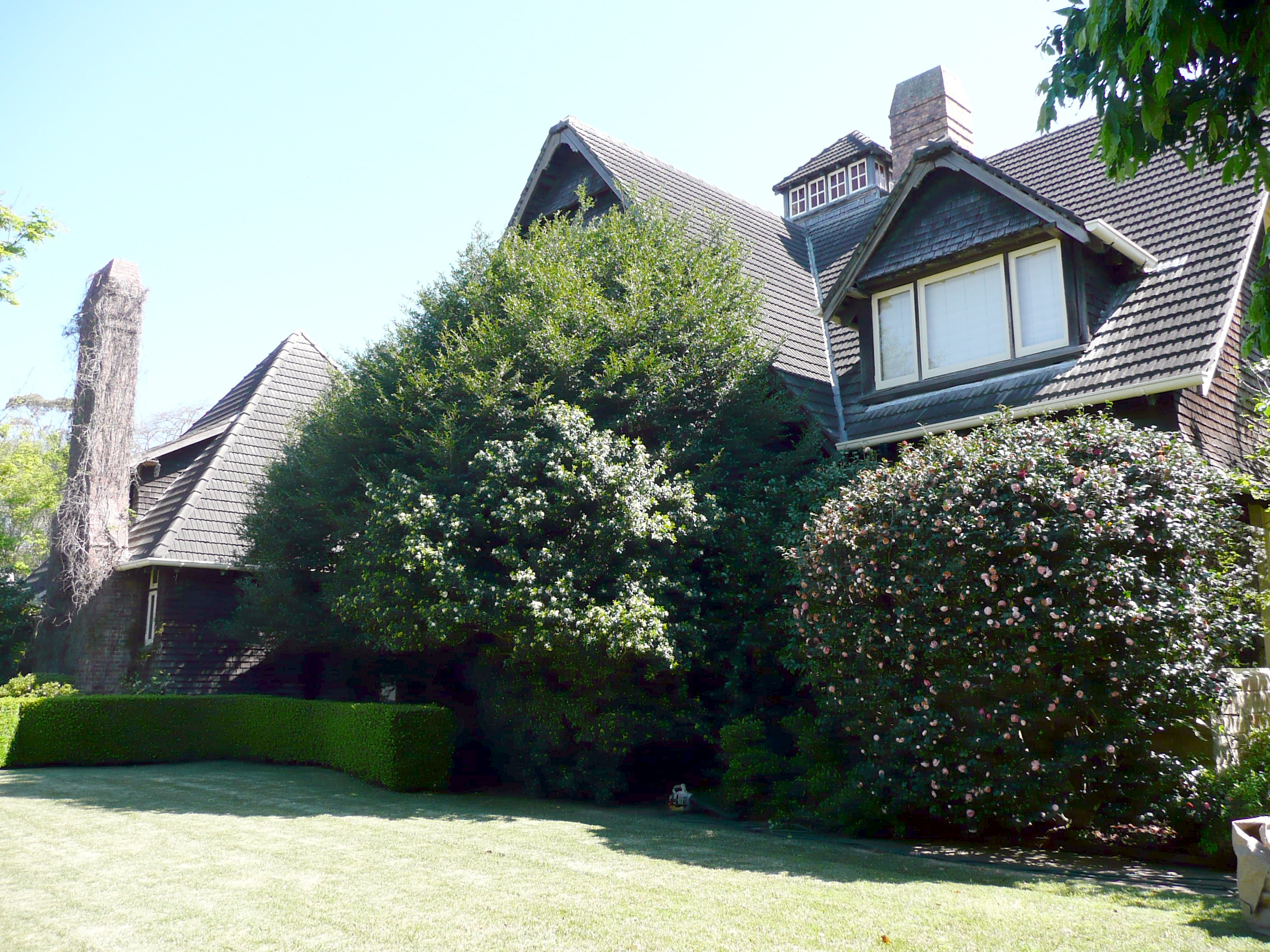
Highlands, Wahroonga

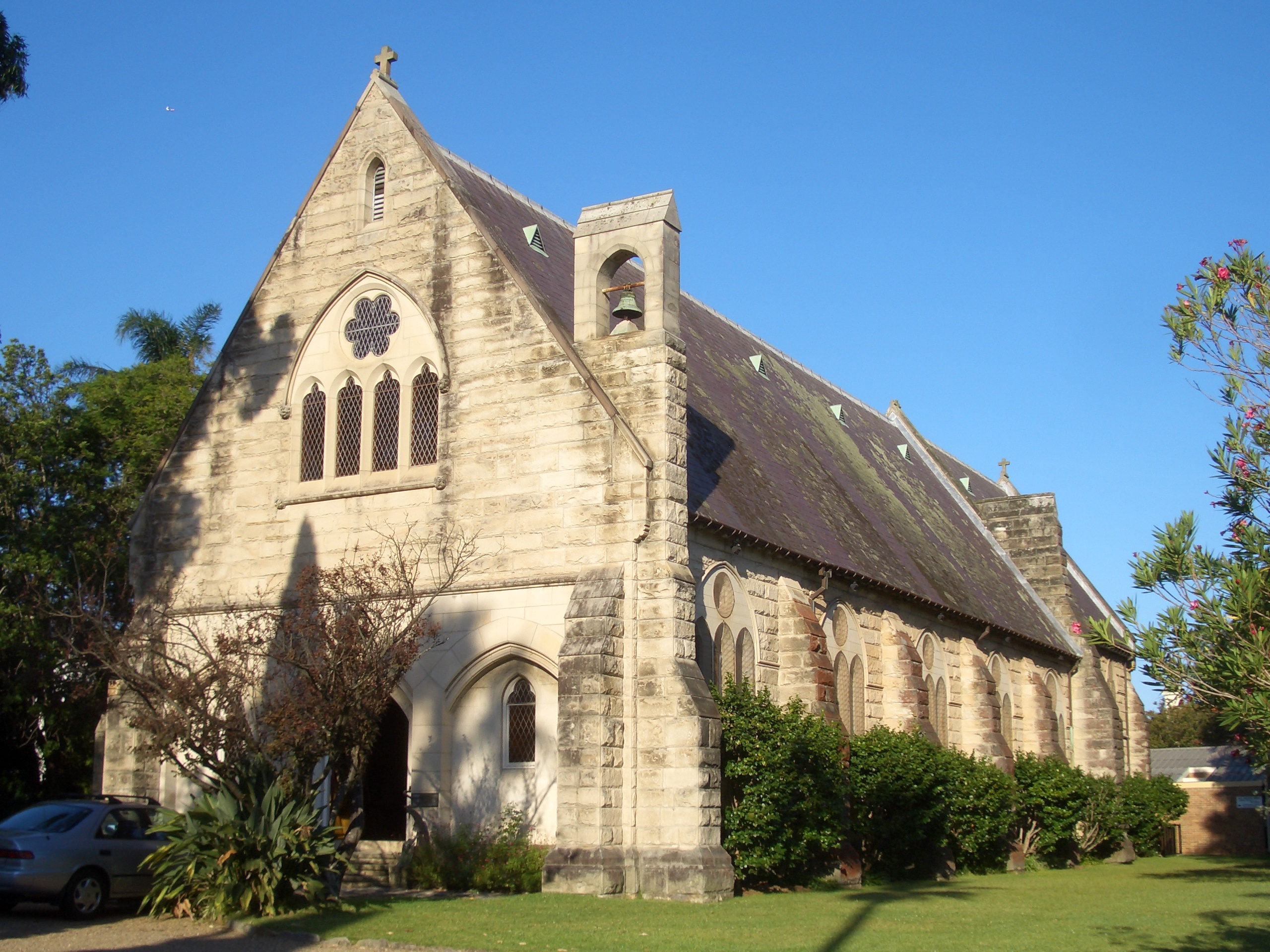
All Saints’ Church, Hunters Hill

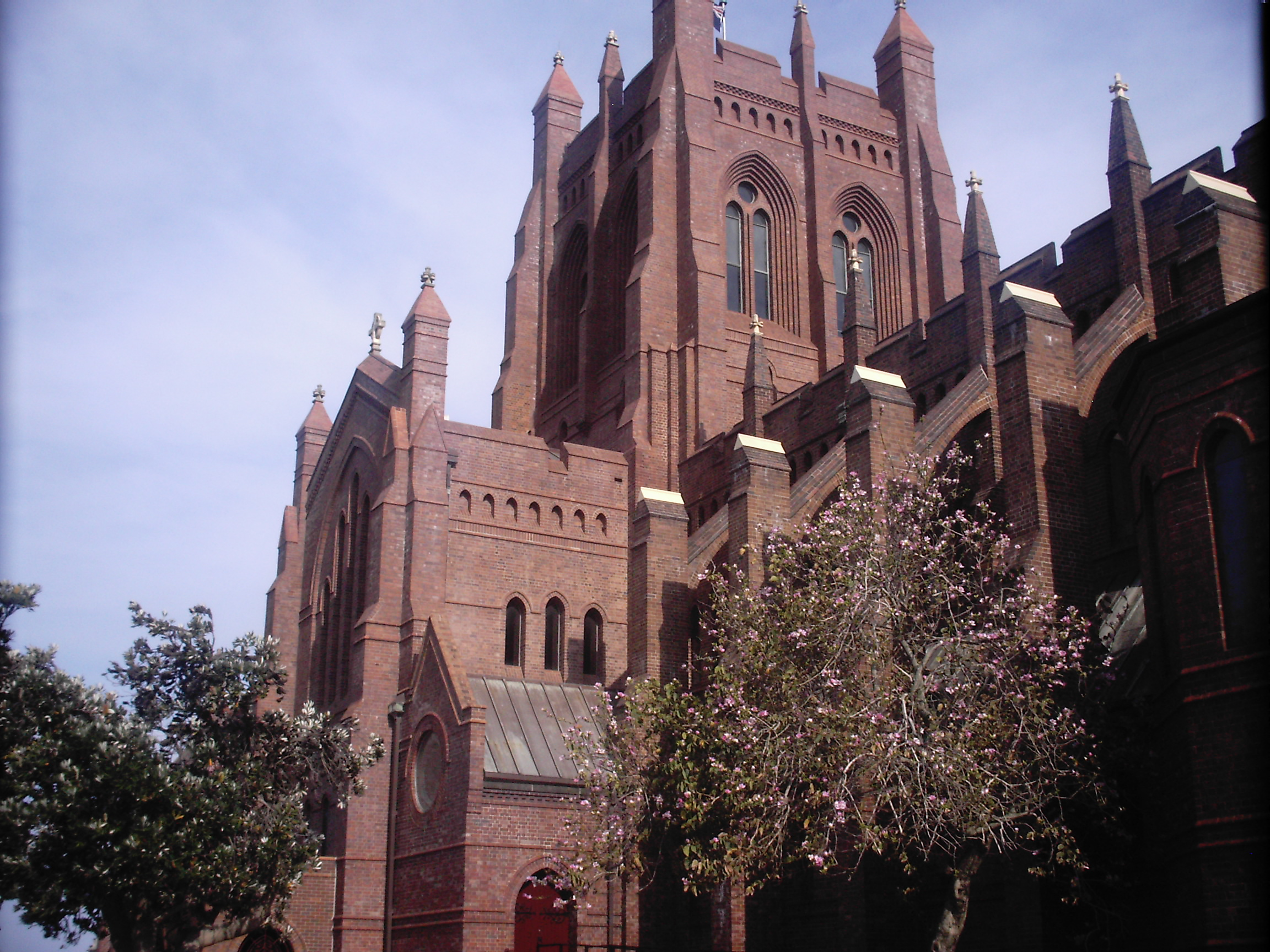
Christ Church Cathedral, Newcastle

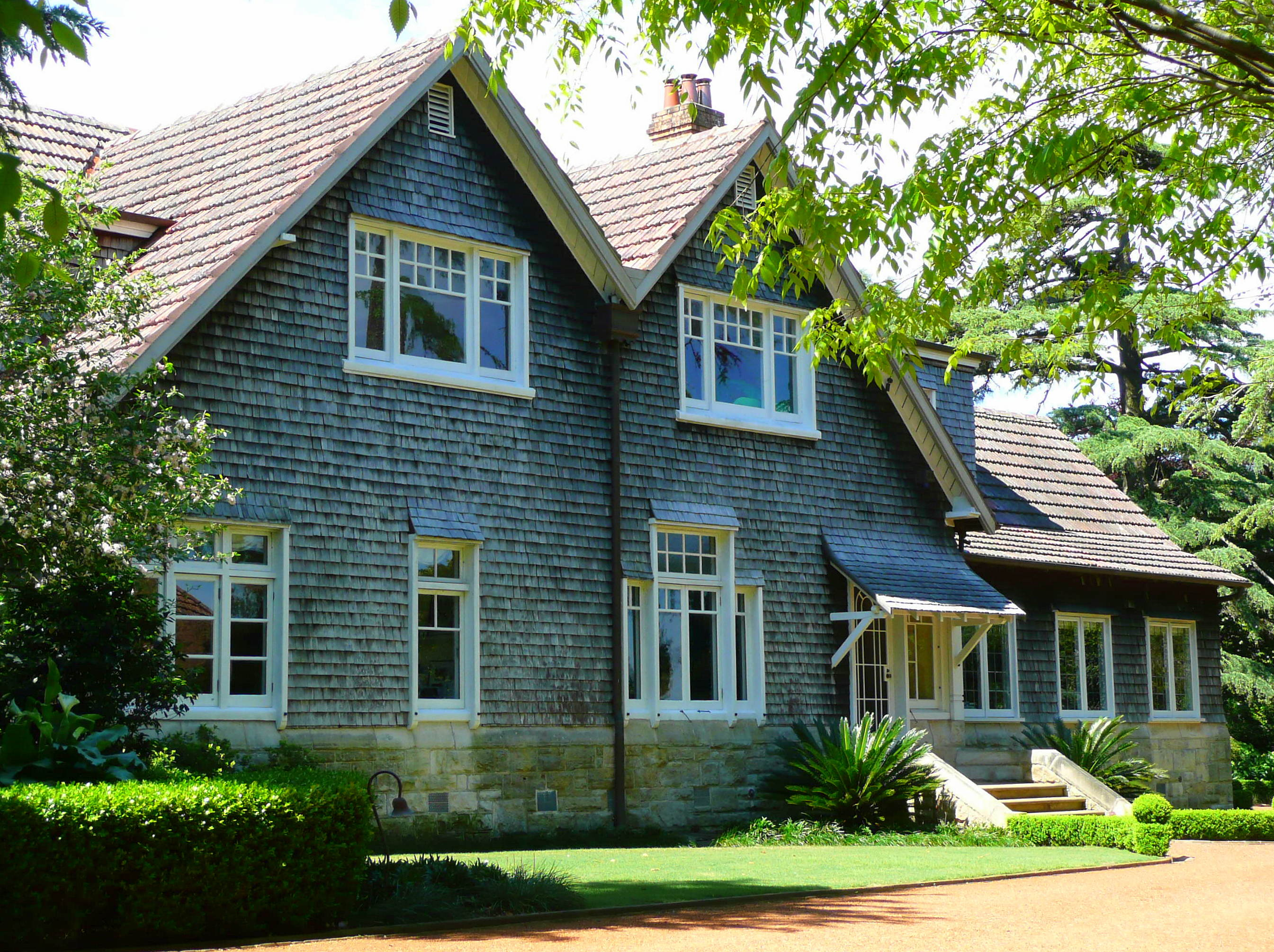
Pibrac, Warrawee

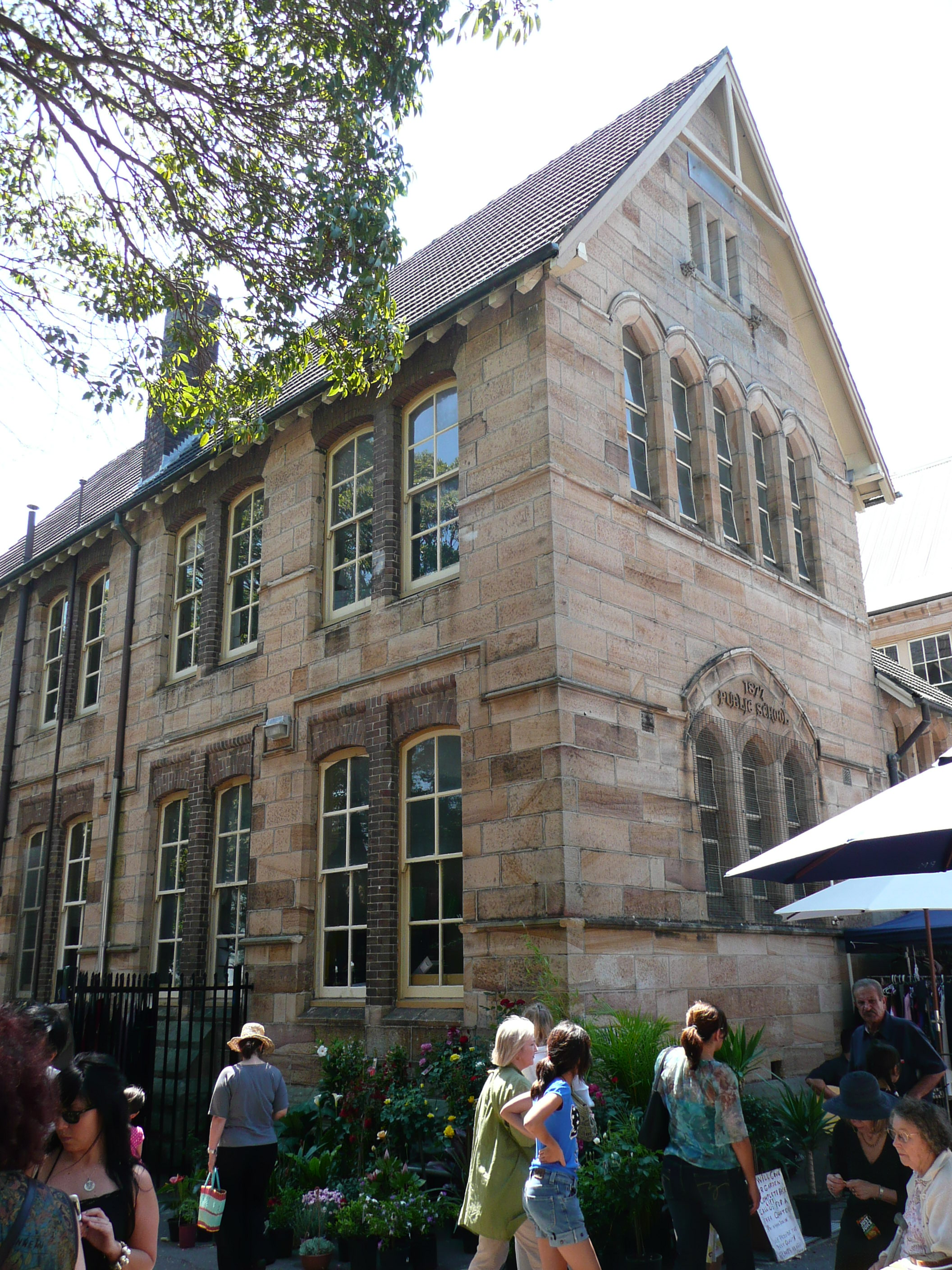
Public School, Rozelle

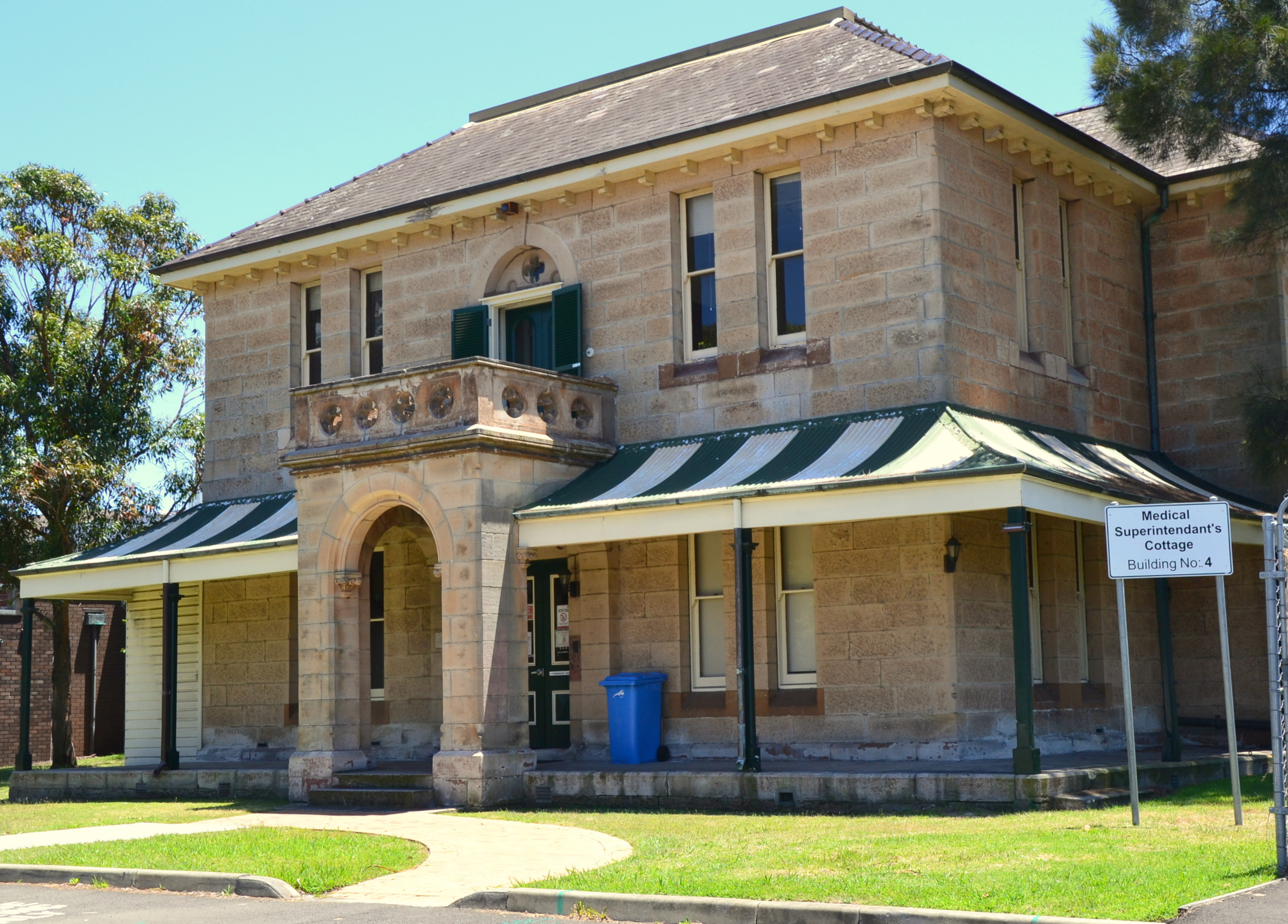
Superintendent's Cottage, Prince of Wales Hospital, Randwick

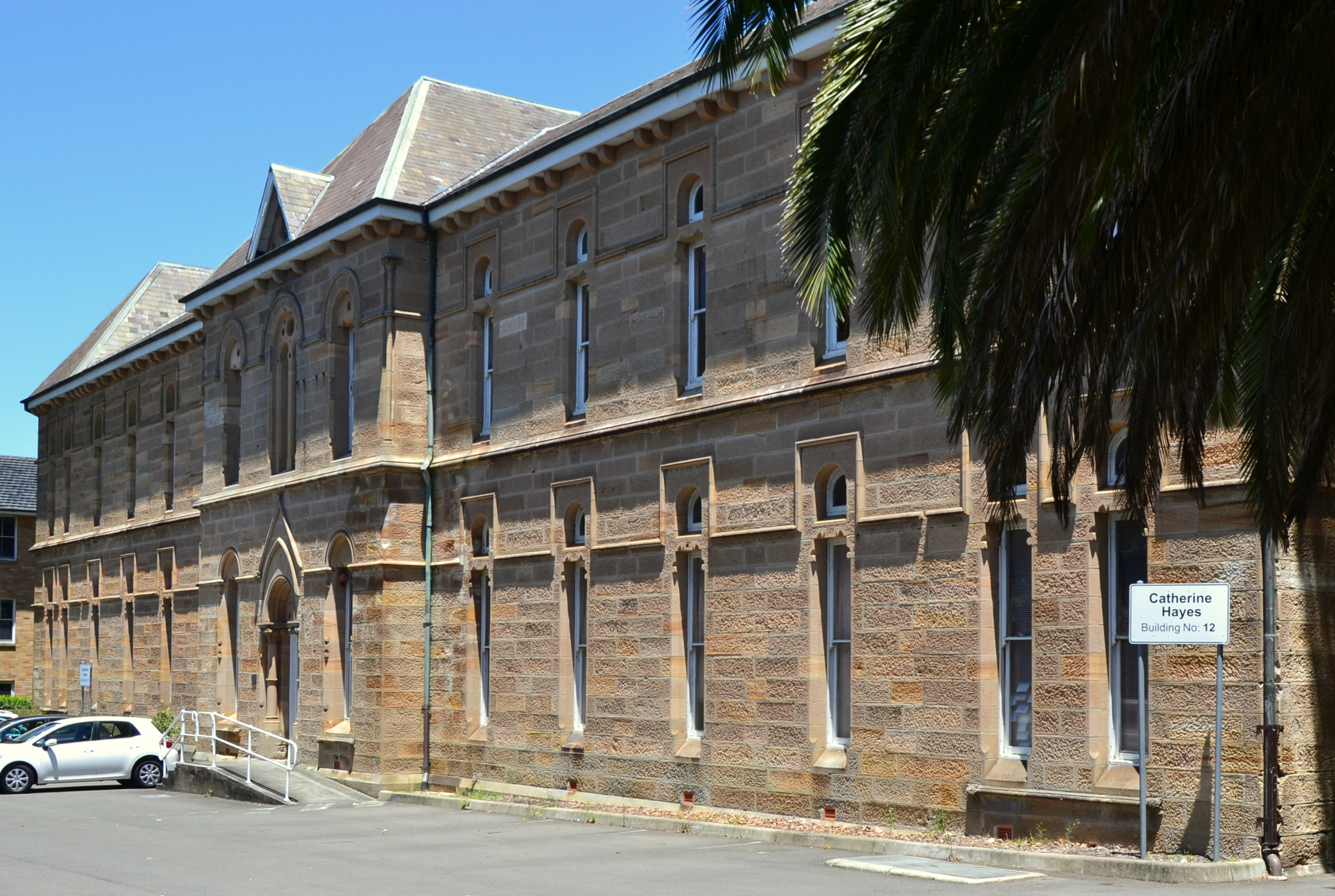
Catherine Hayes Building, Prince of Wales Hospital, Randwick

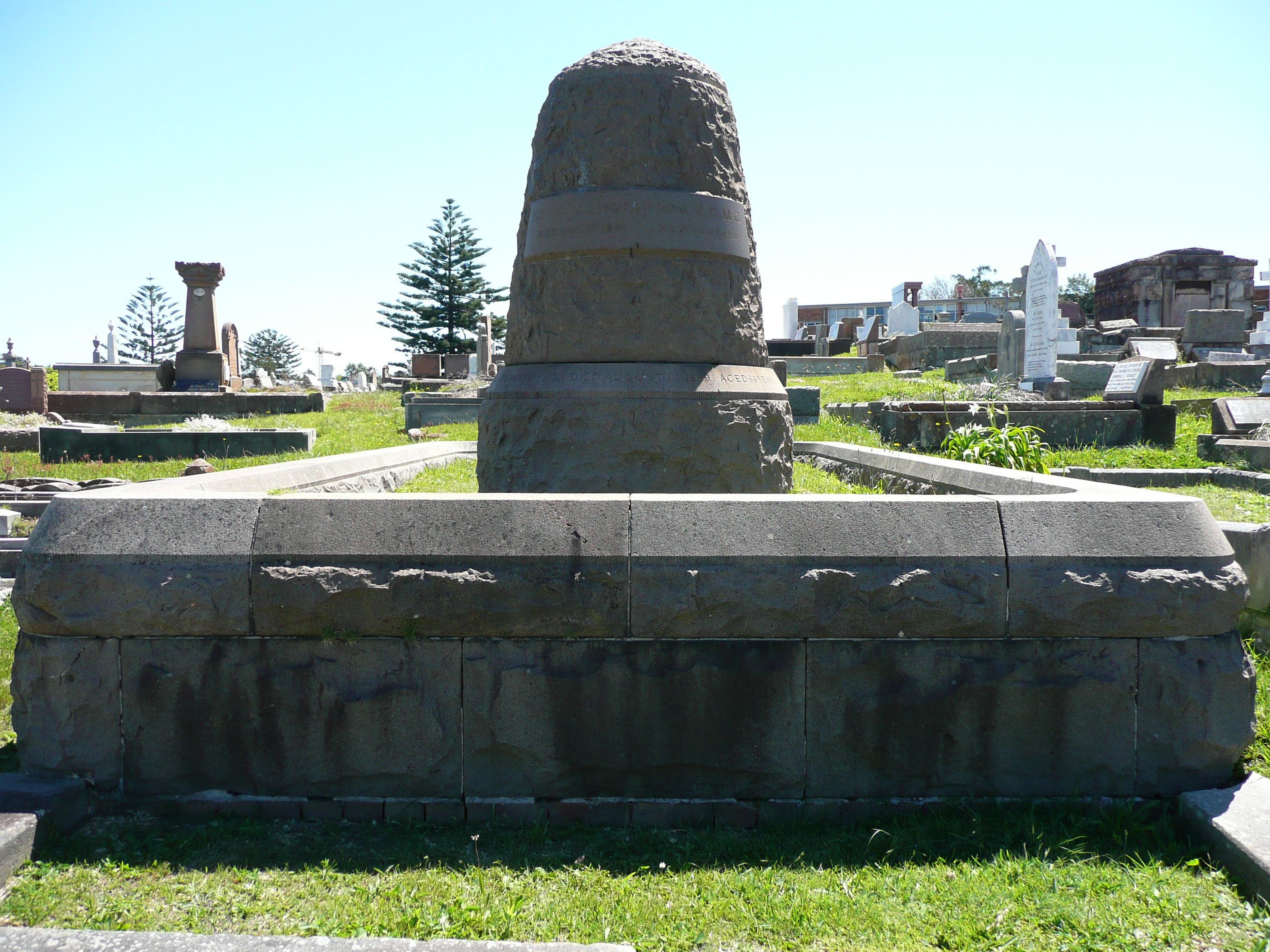
Sir John Robertson Memorial, South Head Cemetery, Vaucluse

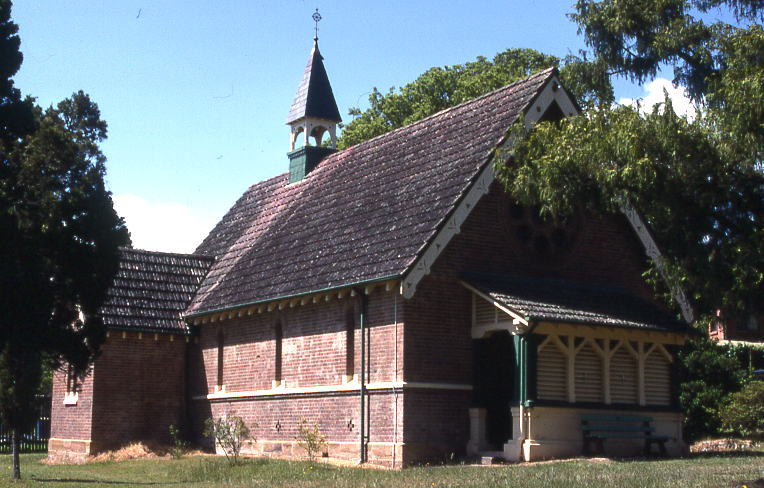
Church of the Good Shepherd, Kangaroo Valley

== See also ==
- Architecture of Australia
- Francis Greenway
- Edmund Blacket
- John H. Buckeridge

Professional and academic associations
Preceded by Thomas Rowe	President of the Institute of Architects of New South Wales; 1889–1895	Succeeded by Thomas Rowe
