= Muswellbrook =

- Town
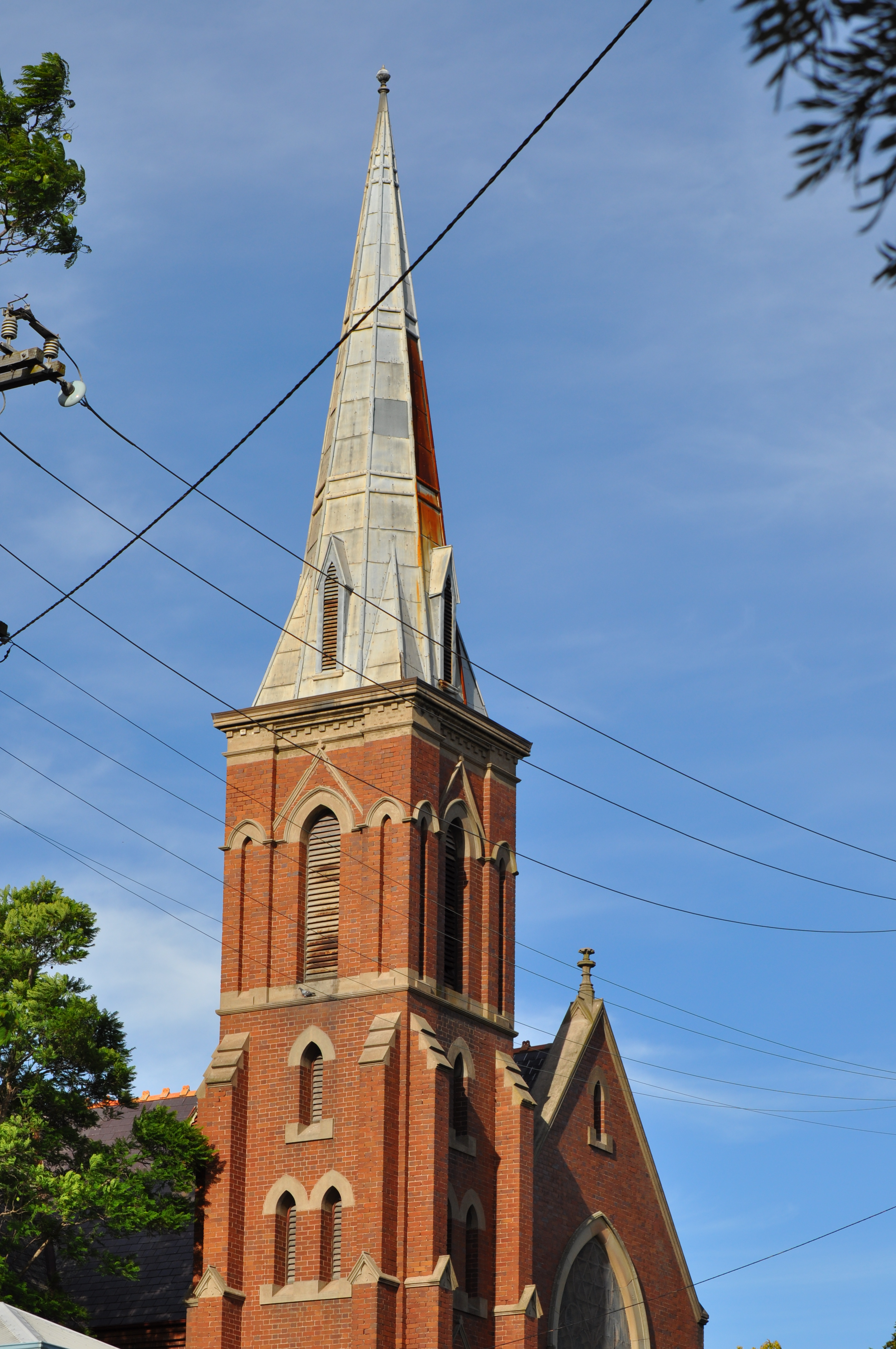
- Hope City Church

- Coordinates: 32°15′56″S 150°53′19″E
- Country: Australia
- State: New South Wales
- LGA: Muswellbrook Shire
- Location: 243 km (151 mi) N of Sydney; 127 km (79 mi) NW of Newcastle; 47 km (29 mi) NW of Singleton; 27 km (17 mi) S of Scone; 272 km (169 mi) E of Dubbo
- Established: 1833

Government
  - State electorate: Upper Hunter
  - Federal division: New England
- Elevation: 220 m (720 ft)

Population
  - Total: 16,000 (2021)
- Postcode: 2333

Muswellbrook (/ˈmʌsəlbrʊk/ MUSS-əl-bruuk) is a town in the Upper Hunter Region of New South Wales, Australia, about 243 km (151 mi) north of Sydney and 127 km (79 mi) north-west of Newcastle.

Geologically, Muswellbrook is situated in the northern parts of the Sydney basin, bordering the New England region.

The area is predominantly known for coal mining and horse breeding, but has also developed a reputation for gourmet food and wine production. As of the 2021 census Muswellbrook has a population of 12,272. Located to the south of the Muswellbrook township are two coal fuelled power stations, Liddell (closed in 2023) and Bayswater. They were commissioned in 1973 and mid 1980s respectively and employ approximately 500 people from the area. The Muswellbrook Coal Mine operated from 1907 to 2022, and is scheduled for a 135 MW solar facility with a 270 MWh / 135 MW grid battery. A 400 MW / 3,200M Wh (8-hour) pumped hydro project may operate by 2030.

== History ==
Before European settlement of the region the Wonnarua and Gamilaroi peoples occupied the land. The first European to explore the area was Chief Constable John Howe in 1819, with the first white settlement occurring in the 1820s. The township of Muswellbrook was gazetted on 23 October 1833. To the south, "Forbestown" was established by the sons of Francis Forbes in 1842; the name was changed in 1848 to "South Muswellbrook" to prevent confusion with the town of Forbes.

== Heritage listings ==
Muswellbrook has a number of heritage-listed sites, including:

- 7 Bridge Street: Muswellbrook Post Office
- 132 Bridge Street: Weidmann Cottage
- 142–144 Bridge Street: Loxton House
- 178, 180–188 Bridge Street: Eatons Group
- 710 Denman Road: Edinglassie
- Denman Road: Rous Lench
- Hunter Terrace: St Alban's Anglican Church
- Main Northern railway: Muswellbrook railway station

== Etymology ==
"Mussel Creek" (now called "Muscle Creek") was first named by a party of surveyors who found mussels in the small stream while camping along its banks in the early 19th century. The present spelling of Muswellbrook has a disputed etymology. Historians largely subscribe to one of two theories:

1. that the name derives from the Muswell Hill area of London (England), due to the influence of Sir Francis Forbes whose wife, Amelia, was born and schooled in that town; or
2. that the name is a gradual corruption of the original gazetted name "Musclebrook", eventually adopted as the official spelling due to common use.

== Population ==
According to the 2021 census of Population, there were 12,272 people in Muswellbrook.

- Aboriginal and Torres Strait Islander people made up 13.1% of the population.
- 84.7% of people were born in Australia. The most common countries of birth were New Zealand 1.5%, England 1.0% and Philippines 0.9%.
- 86.9% of people only spoke English at home.
- The most common responses for religion were No Religion 35.6%, Anglican 23.0%, and Catholic 20.2%.

Historical population
Year	Pop.	±%
1921	2,789	—
1933	3,984	+42.8%
1947	3,939	−1.1%
1954	5,635	+43.1%
1961	5,717	+1.5%
1966	6,486	+13.5%
1971	8,125	+25.3%
1976	7,805	−3.9%
1981	8,548	+9.5%
1986	9,988	+16.8%
1991	10,140	+1.5%
1996	10,541	+4.0%
2001	10,010	−5.0%
2006	10,222	+2.1%
2011	11,042	+8.0%
2016	10,404	−5.8%
2021	10,901	+4.8%
Source: Australian Bureau of Statistics data.

== Transport ==
The New England Highway currently passes through the town. A route was selected for a bypass in 2006 but the Australian Government suspended the project in August 2008. Denman Road provides a connection to the Golden Highway.

=== Rail ===
Muswellbrook railway station is served by local (Newcastle to Scone) and long-distance rail (Sydney to Armidale and Moree) services. Interstate coaches and local bus services also call at the station.

Muswellbrook lies at the junction of the Main Northern railway line and the Merriwa line, part of a cross country rail line to Gulgong. As such, it formed an important junction, as well as serving the numerous coal mining sidings found within a short distance from the main station building.

== Popular culture ==
The Steely Dan song "Black Friday" from the 1975 album Katy Lied contains the lyrics:

"When Black Friday comes,

I'll fly down to Muswellbrook, gonna strike all the big red words from my little black book.

Gonna do just what I please, gonna wear no socks and shoes, with nothing to do but feed

all the kangaroos."

Songwriter Donald Fagen explained the lyrics in an interview with Paul Cashmere of Undercover Music; "I think we had a map and put our finger down at the place that we thought would be the furthest away from New York or wherever we were at the time".

Donald Horne spent his early childhood in Muswellbrook and the first volume of his autobiography, The Education of Young Donald, features an extensive description of life in the town in the 1920s and early 1930s.

Muswellbrook is also mentioned in Thomas Keneally's book The Chant of Jimmie Blacksmith.

Muswellbrook also features prominently in the Robert G Barrett novel, "The Tesla Legacy".

== Annual events ==
- Blue Heeler Film Festival
- Muswellbrook Carnivale
- Muswellbrook and Upper Hunter Eisteddfod
- Muswellbrook Creative Arts Fair
- NAIDOC Week Art Awards
- Rock'n The Brook
- The Muswellbrook Show
- Noisy Heerler Music Festival (October)
- St Heliers Heavy Horse Field Days

== Media ==
=== Television ===
All major digital-only television channels are available in Muswellbrook. The networks and the channels they broadcast are listed as follows:

- Seven (formerly Prime7 and Prime Television), 7two, 7mate, 7Bravo and 7flix. Seven Network owned and operated station channels.
- Nine (NBN), 9Go!, 9Gem and 9Life. Nine Network affiliated channels, owned by WIN Corporation.
- 10, 10 Drama, 10 Comedy and Nickelodeon. Network 10 owned and operated station channels.
- ABC, ABC Family, ABC Kids, ABC Entertains and ABC News, part of the Australian Broadcasting Corporation.
- SBS, SBS2, SBS World Movies, SBS WorldWatch, SBS Food and NITV, part of the Special Broadcasting Service.

=== Radio ===
Muswellbrook has three local radio stations:

- ABC Upper Hunter on 105.7 FM and 1044 AM
- Power FM on 98.1 FM
- 2NM on 981 AM

Other radio stations that broadcast to the town are:

- Radio National on 1512 FM
- ABC NewsRadio on 104.9 FM
- KIX Country on 94.5 FM
- hit106.9 Newcastle on 106.9 FM

=== Newspapers ===
The town is served by the local newspaper The Muswellbrook Chronicle.

== Schools ==
- Muswellbrook High School
- Muswellbrook Public School
- Muswellbrook South Public School
- Pacific Brook Christian School
- Richard Gill School
- St James Muswellbrook

== Military history ==
During World War II, Muswellbrook was the location of RAAF No.5 Inland Aircraft Fuel Depot (IAFD), completed in 1942 and closed on 29 August 1944. Usually consisting of 4 tanks, 31 fuel depots were built across Australia for the storage and supply of aircraft fuel for the RAAF and the US Army Air Forces at a total cost of £900,000 (A$1,800,000).

== Notable persons ==
- Fletcher Baker (born 1999), a rugby league footballer for the Sydney Roosters NRL side, was born in Muswellbrook.
- Kurt Barnes (born 1981), a professional golfer, was born and raised in Muswellbrook
- Brooke Boney (born 1987), entertainment reporter on the Nine Network's breakfast program Today
- James Clifford (1936–1987), an artist, was born and raised in Muswellbrook
- Tommy Emmanuel AM (born 1955), a virtuoso guitarist, was born in Muswellbrook
- Jamie Feeney (born 1978), a rugby league footballer was born in Muswellbrook
- Rylan Gray (born 2006), a V8 Supercars driver for Dick Johnson Racing Supercars Team, was born in Muswellbrook.
- Wayne Harris (born 1960), a jockey who rode Jeune to victory in the 1994 Melbourne Cup, was born and raised in Muswellbrook
- Shayne Hayne (born 1967), a rugby league football referee, grew up and spent most of his life in Muswellbrook
- Donald Horne AO (1921–2005), an author and journalist, was raised in Muswellbrook. Much of one of Horne's memoirs, The education of young Donald, published in 1967, was based on his educative years in Muswellbook
- Simon Orchard (born 1986), an Australian hockey player and Olympic medalist, was born and raised in Muswellbrook
- Brydie Parker (born 1999), a rugby league footballer for the Sydney Roosters NRLW side, was born in Muswellbrook.
- Brian Wilkinson (1938–2026), an Australian swimmer.

== See also ==
- Hunter Institute of TAFE
- Hunter River (New South Wales)
- Power FM 98.1
- The Muswellbrook Chronicle and Upper Hunter advertiser
- Wollemi National Park
