= Electoral results for the district of Upper Hunter =

Election results for state seat of Hunter, New South Wales, Australia

Upper Hunter, an electoral district of the Legislative Assembly in the Australian state of New South Wales, has had three incarnations, the first from 1859 to 1894, the second from 1904 to 1920, and the third from 1927 to the present.

== Members ==
First incarnation (1856–1894)
Election	Member	Party		
1859	John Robertson	None		
1860	John Robertson	None		
1861 by	Thomas Dangar	None		
1864	James White	None		
1868 by	Archibald Bell	None		
1869	Archibald Bell	None		
1872	John Creed	None		
1874	Francis White	None		
1875 by 1	Thomas Hungerford	None		
1875 by 2	John McElhone	None		
1877	John McElhone	None	Member	Party
1880	John McElhone	None	John McLaughlin	None
1882	John McElhone	None	John McLaughlin	None
1883 by	John McElhone	None	John McLaughlin	None
1885	Robert Fitzgerald	None	Thomas Hungerford	None
1887	Robert Fitzgerald	Free Trade	John McElhone	Free Trade
1889	Robert Fitzgerald	Protectionist	William Abbott	Protectionist
1891	Robert Fitzgerald	Protectionist	Thomas Williams	Labor
Second incarnation (1904–1920)
Election	Member	Party		
1904	William Fleming	Liberal Reform		
1907	William Fleming	Liberal Reform		
1910 by	William Ashford	Labor		
1910	Henry Willis	Liberal Reform		
1913	Mac Abbott	Farmers and Settlers		
1917	Mac Abbott	Nationalist		
1918	William Cameron	Nationalist		
Third incarnation (1927–present)
Election	Member	Party		
1927	William Cameron	Nationalist		
1930	William Cameron	Nationalist		
1931 by	Malcolm Brown	Independent Country		
1932	Malcolm Brown	Country		
1935	Malcolm Brown	Country		
1938	Malcolm Brown	Country		
1939 by	D'Arcy Rose	Country		
1941	D'Arcy Rose	Country		
1944	D'Arcy Rose	Country		
1947	D'Arcy Rose	Country		
1950	D'Arcy Rose	Country		
1953	D'Arcy Rose	Country		
1956	D'Arcy Rose	Country		
1959	Leon Punch	Country		
1962	Frank O'Keefe	Country		
1965	Frank O'Keefe	Country		
1968	Frank O'Keefe	Country		
1970 by	Col Fisher	Country		
1971	Col Fisher	Country		
1973	Col Fisher	Country		
1976	Col Fisher	Country		
1978	Col Fisher	National Country		
1981	Col Fisher	National Country		
1984	Col Fisher	National		
1988	George Souris	National		
1991	George Souris	National		
1995	George Souris	National		
1999	George Souris	National		
2004	George Souris	National		
2007	George Souris	National		
2011	George Souris	National		
2015	Michael Johnsen	National		
2019	Michael Johnsen	National		
2021 by	Dave Layzell	National		
2023	Dave Layzell	National		

== Election results ==
=== Elections in the 2020s ===
==== 2023 ====
2023 New South Wales state election: Upper Hunter
Party	Candidate	Votes	%	±%
National	Dave Layzell	19,868	37.0	+7.6
Labor	Peree Watson	15,488	28.9	−2.0
Shooters, Fishers, Farmers	James White	6,302	11.7	−7.3
Independent	Dale McNamara	5,190	9.7	+9.7
Greens	Tony Lonergan	3,207	6.0	+0.5
Legalise Cannabis	Tom Lillicrap	2,743	5.1	+5.1
Sustainable Australia	Calum Blair	862	1.6	+1.6
Total formal votes		53,660	96.6	+0.1
Informal votes		1,871	3.4	−0.1
Turnout		55,531	89.2	−2.5
Two-party-preferred result
National	Dave Layzell	22,964	53.8	+3.3
Labor	Peree Watson	19,732	46.2	−3.3
National hold		Swing	+3.3	

==== 2021 ====
2021 Upper Hunter by-election
Party	Candidate	Votes	%	±%
National	Dave Layzell	14,805	31.20	−2.79
Labor	Jeff Drayton	10,055	21.19	−7.46
One Nation	Dale McNamara	5,845	12.32	+12.32
Shooters, Fishers, Farmers	Sue Gilroy	5,676	11.96	−10.08
Independent	Kirsty O'Connell	4,176	8.80	+8.80
Independent	Tracy Norman	1,951	4.11	+4.11
Greens	Sue Abbott	1,648	3.47	−1.31
Independent	Steven Reynolds	1,027	2.16	+2.16
Liberal Democrats	Eva Pears	698	1.47	−2.96
Independent	Kate Fraser	644	1.36	+1.36
Animal Justice	Michael Dello-Iacovo	397	0.84	−1.14
Sustainable Australia	Calum Blair	375	0.79	−1.43
Independent	Archie Lea	156	0.33	+0.33
Total formal votes		47,453	97.47	+0.85
Informal votes		1,234	2.53	−0.85
Turnout		48,687	86.74	−3.80
Two-party-preferred result
National	Dave Layzell	18,484	55.82	+3.26
Labor	Jeff Drayton	14,631	44.18	−3.26
National hold		Swing	+3.26	

=== Elections in the 2010s ===
==== 2019 ====
2019 New South Wales state election: Upper Hunter
Party	Candidate	Votes	%	±%
National	Michael Johnsen	16,492	33.99	−4.88
Labor	Melanie Dagg	13,900	28.65	−3.89
Shooters, Fishers, Farmers	Lee Watts	10,697	22.04	+22.04
Greens	Tony Lonergan	2,320	4.78	−0.73
Liberal Democrats	Mark Ellis	2,151	4.43	+4.43
Sustainable Australia	Calum Blair	1,077	2.22	+2.22
Animal Justice	Claire Robertson	961	1.98	+1.98
Christian Democrats	Richard Stretton	927	1.91	−0.21
Total formal votes		48,525	96.61	−0.30
Informal votes		1,701	3.39	+0.30
Turnout		50,226	90.54	−0.70
Two-party-preferred result
National	Michael Johnsen	19,341	52.56	+0.35
Labor	Melanie Dagg	17,456	47.44	−0.35
National hold		Swing	+0.35	

==== 2015 ====
2015 New South Wales state election: Upper Hunter
Party	Candidate	Votes	%	±%
National	Michael Johnsen	18,384	38.9	−15.6
Labor	Martin Rush	15,387	32.5	+14.3
Independent	Lee Watts	9,170	19.4	+19.4
Greens	John Kaye	2,608	5.5	−0.1
Christian Democrats	Richard Stretton	1,003	2.1	−0.3
No Land Tax	Louisa Checchin	744	1.6	+1.6
Total formal votes		47,296	96.9	+0.4
Informal votes		1,506	3.1	−0.4
Turnout		48,802	91.2	+0.2
Two-party-preferred result
National	Michael Johnsen	20,496	52.2	−20.8
Labor	Martin Rush	18,764	47.8	+20.8
National hold		Swing	−20.8	

==== 2011 ====
2011 New South Wales state election: Upper Hunter
Party	Candidate	Votes	%	±%
National	George Souris	24,555	54.7	−5.5
Independent	Tim Duddy	8,653	19.3	+19.3
Labor	Michael Gibbons	8,047	17.9	−13.4
Greens	Chris Parker	2,563	5.7	−2.8
Christian Democrats	Fred Cowley	1,109	2.5	+2.5
Total formal votes		44,927	97.2	−0.7
Informal votes		1,276	2.8	+0.7
Turnout		46,203	93.7	
Notional two-party-preferred count
National	George Souris	27,723	73.3	+8.6
Labor	Michael Gibbons	10,087	26.7	−8.6
Two-candidate-preferred result
National	George Souris	26,179	68.3	+3.5
Independent	Tim Duddy	12,161	31.7	+31.7
National hold		Swing	+3.5	

=== Elections in the 2000s ===
==== 2007 ====
2007 New South Wales state election: Upper Hunter
Party	Candidate	Votes	%	±%
National	George Souris	26,342	60.2	+16.9
Labor	Jennifer Lecky	13,685	31.3	−4.4
Greens	Bev Smiles	3,731	8.5	+2.9
Total formal votes		43,758	97.9	−0.2
Informal votes		939	2.1	+0.2
Turnout		44,697	94.1	
Two-party-preferred result
National	George Souris	27,189	64.7	+7.4
Labor	Jennifer Lecky	14,807	35.3	−7.4
National hold		Swing	+7.4	

==== 2003 ====
2003 New South Wales state election: Upper Hunter
Party	Candidate	Votes	%	±%
National	George Souris	21,251	55.1	+5.9
Labor	Chris Connor	12,310	31.9	+0.2
Greens	Neil Strachan	2,285	5.9	+2.9
Independent	Steven Lawler	1,420	3.7	+3.7
One Nation	David Churches	1,332	3.5	−9.3
Total formal votes		38,598	96.1	+0.0
Informal votes		748	1.9	−0.0
Turnout		39,346	93.3	
Two-party-preferred result
National	George Souris	22,446	62.7	+2.2
Labor	Chris Connor	13,345	37.3	−2.2
National hold		Swing	+2.2	

=== Elections in the 1990s ===
==== 1999 ====
1999 New South Wales state election: Upper Hunter
Party	Candidate	Votes	%	±%
National	George Souris	19,307	49.2	−16.4
Labor	Chris Connor	12,450	31.7	+0.8
One Nation	Barrie Lawn	5,030	12.8	+12.8
Greens	Neil Strachan	1,195	3.0	+3.0
Citizens Electoral Council	George Easey	670	1.7	+1.7
Christian Democrats	Derrick Paxton	626	1.6	+1.1
Total formal votes		39,278	98.1	+4.8
Informal votes		756	1.9	−4.8
Turnout		40,034	94.9	
Two-party-preferred result
National	George Souris	21,250	60.5	−8.1
Labor	Chris Connor	13,880	39.5	+8.1
National hold		Swing	−8.1	

==== 1995 ====
1995 New South Wales state election: Upper Hunter
Party	Candidate	Votes	%	±%
National	George Souris	23,421	69.0	+10.8
Labor	Pat Baks	10,521	31.0	−0.9
Total formal votes		33,942	93.0	+0.1
Informal votes		2,542	7.0	−0.1
Turnout		36,484	94.7	
National hold		Swing	+4.3	

==== 1991 ====
1991 New South Wales state election: Upper Hunter
Party	Candidate	Votes	%	±%
National	George Souris	19,262	58.2	−4.5
Labor	Pat Baks	10,554	31.9	+0.6
Country Residents	Robert Duff	2,177	6.6	+6.6
Citizens Electoral Council	Margaret Hawkins	1,115	3.4	+3.4
Total formal votes		33,108	93.0	−4.6
Informal votes		2,511	7.0	+4.6
Turnout		35,619	94.9	
Two-party-preferred result
National	George Souris	20,661	64.7	−2.5
Labor	Pat Baks	11,274	35.3	+2.5
National hold		Swing	−2.5	

=== Elections in the 1980s ===
==== 1988 ====
1988 New South Wales state election: Upper Hunter
Party	Candidate	Votes	%	±%
National	George Souris	20,055	67.8	+9.7
Labor	Colleen Green	9,522	32.2	−8.3
Total formal votes		29,577	97.0	−1.9
Informal votes		900	3.0	+1.9
Turnout		30,477	94.0	
National hold		Swing	+9.1	

==== 1984 ====
1984 New South Wales state election: Upper Hunter
Party	Candidate	Votes	%	±%
National	Col Fisher	18,999	59.5	+3.1
Labor	Colleen Green	12,926	40.5	−3.1
Total formal votes		31,925	98.6	+0.6
Informal votes		456	1.4	−0.6
Turnout		32,381	93.9	+1.1
National hold		Swing	+3.1	

==== 1981 ====
1981 New South Wales state election: Upper Hunter
Party	Candidate	Votes	%	±%
National Country	Col Fisher	16,640	56.4	+2.0
Labor	Ronald Brumpton	12,886	43.6	−2.0
Total formal votes		29,526	98.0	
Informal votes		589	2.0	
Turnout		30,115	92.8	
National Country hold		Swing	+2.0	

=== Elections in the 1970s ===
==== 1978 ====
1978 New South Wales state election: Upper Hunter
Party	Candidate	Votes	%	±%
National Country	Col Fisher	13,818	54.4	−8.3
Labor	Ronald Brumpton	11,597	45.6	+8.3
Total formal votes		25,415	98.3	−0.3
Informal votes		436	1.7	+0.3
Turnout		25,851	95.2	+0.1
National Country hold		Swing	−8.3	

==== 1976 ====
1976 New South Wales state election: Upper Hunter
Party	Candidate	Votes	%	±%
Country	Col Fisher	15,432	62.7	+1.5
Labor	Michael Reddy	9,164	37.3	+1.8
Total formal votes		24,596	98.6	−0.2
Informal votes		357	1.4	+0.2
Turnout		24,953	95.1	−0.1
Country hold		Swing	−1.1	

==== 1973 ====
1973 New South Wales state election: Upper Hunter
Party	Candidate	Votes	%	±%
Country	Col Fisher	14,413	61.2	+4.6
Labor	Kenneth Cosgrove	8,360	35.5	−7.9
Democratic Labor	Kathleen Buckingham	711	3.3	+3.3
Total formal votes		23,544	98.8	
Informal votes		277	1.2	
Turnout		23,821	95.2	
Two-party-preferred result
Country	Col Fisher	15,030	63.8	+7.2
Labor	Kenneth Cosgrove	8,514	36.2	−7.2
Country hold		Swing	+7.2	

==== 1971 ====
1971 New South Wales state election: Upper Hunter
Party	Candidate	Votes	%	±%
Country	Col Fisher	9,631	48.1	−17.1
Labor	Kenneth Cosgrove	5,922	29.6	−4.9
Labor	Alexander Trevallion	4,474	22.3	+22.3
Total formal votes		20,027	98.8	
Informal votes		248	1.2	
Turnout		20,275	94.5	
Two-party-preferred result
Country	Col Fisher	10,347	51.7	−13.8
Labor	Alexander Trevallion	9,680	48.3	+13.8
Country hold		Swing	−13.8	

==== 1970 by-election ====
1970 Upper Hunter by-election Saturday 14 February
Party	Candidate	Votes	%	±%
Country	Col Fisher	7,092	36.8	−28.6
Labor	Roger Nott	8,501	44.1	+9.6
Liberal	Ivor Peebles	3,666	19.0	
Total formal votes		19,259	99.0	−0.1
Informal votes		196	1.0	+0.1
Turnout		19,455	90.4	−5.6
Two-party-preferred result
Country	Col Fisher	9,929	51.6	−13.9
Labor	Roger Nott	9,330	48.4	+13.9
Country hold		Swing	−13.9	

Frank O'Keefe (Country) resigned to successfully contest the federal seat of Paterson.

=== Elections in the 1960s ===
==== 1968 ====
1968 New South Wales state election: Upper Hunter
Party	Candidate	Votes	%	±%
Country	Frank O'Keefe	12,860	65.5	+1.8
Labor	Leo Musgrave	6,785	34.5	−1.8
Total formal votes		19,645	99.1	
Informal votes		184	0.9	
Turnout		19,829	96.0	
Country hold		Swing	+1.8	

==== 1965 ====
1965 New South Wales state election: Upper Hunter
Party	Candidate	Votes	%	±%
Country	Frank O'Keefe	10,797	63.7	+13.3
Labor	Leslie Uhrig	6,162	36.3	−13.3
Total formal votes		16,959	99.1	−0.3
Informal votes		145	0.9	+0.3
Turnout		17,104	95.6	−0.4
Country hold		Swing	+13.3	

==== 1962 ====
1962 New South Wales state election: Upper Hunter
Party	Candidate	Votes	%	±%
Country	Frank O'Keefe	8,651	50.4	+10.4
Labor	Geoffrey Heuston	8,517	49.6	+8.8
Total formal votes		17,168	99.4	
Informal votes		97	0.6	
Turnout		17,265	96.0	
Country hold		Swing	−2.1	

=== Elections in the 1950s ===
==== 1959 ====
1959 New South Wales state election: Upper Hunter
Party	Candidate	Votes	%	±%
Labor	Geoffrey Heuston	6,564	40.8	
Country	Leon Punch	6,430	40.0	
Independent	George Adams	2,025	12.6	
Independent	John Moore	1,066	6.6	
Total formal votes		16,085	98.4	
Informal votes		263	1.6	
Turnout		16,348	96.7	
Two-party-preferred result
Country	Leon Punch	8,442	52.5	
Labor	Geoffrey Heuston	7,643	47.5	
Country hold		Swing		

==== 1956 ====
1956 New South Wales state election: Upper Hunter
Party	Candidate	Votes	%	±%
Country	D'Arcy Rose	9,166	57.0	+1.7
Labor	Albert Khan	6,907	43.0	−1.7
Total formal votes		16,073	99.4	+0.3
Informal votes		99	0.6	−0.3
Turnout		16,172	94.6	−1.1
Country hold		Swing	+1.7	

==== 1953 ====
1953 New South Wales state election: Upper Hunter
Party	Candidate	Votes	%	±%
Country	D'Arcy Rose	8,791	55.3	
Labor	George McGuirk	7,093	44.7	
Total formal votes		15,884	99.1	
Informal votes		144	0.9	
Turnout		16,028	95.7	
Country hold		Swing		

==== 1950 ====
1950 New South Wales state election: Upper Hunter
Party	Candidate	Votes	%	±%
Country	D'Arcy Rose	9,512	63.1	
Labor	Leonard Neville	5,571	36.9	
Total formal votes		15,083	98.3	
Informal votes		261	1.7	
Turnout		15,344	85.9	
Country hold		Swing		

=== Elections in the 1940s ===
==== 1947 ====
1947 New South Wales state election: Upper Hunter
Party	Candidate	Votes	%	±%
Country	D'Arcy Rose	9,341	63.5	+5.9
Labor	John Speers	5,377	36.5	−5.9
Total formal votes		14,718	98.9	+0.9
Informal votes		165	1.1	−0.9
Turnout		14,883	94.7	+3.7
Country hold		Swing	+5.9	

==== 1944 ====
1944 New South Wales state election: Upper Hunter
Party	Candidate	Votes	%	±%
Country	D'Arcy Rose	7,506	57.6	+1.6
Labor	Walter Geraghty	5,528	42.4	−1.6
Total formal votes		13,034	98.0	−0.6
Informal votes		267	2.0	+0.6
Turnout		13,301	91.0	−3.4
Country hold		Swing	+1.6	

==== 1941 ====
1941 New South Wales state election: Upper Hunter
Party	Candidate	Votes	%	±%
Country	D'Arcy Rose	7,607	56.0	
Labor	Walter Geraghty	5,969	44.0	
Total formal votes		13,576	98.6	
Informal votes		187	1.4	
Turnout		13,763	94.2	
Country hold		Swing		

=== Elections in the 1930s ===
==== 1939 by-election ====
1939 Upper Hunter by-election Saturday 7 October
Party	Candidate	Votes	%	±%
Labor	James Russell	5,470	42.5	
Country	D'Arcy Rose	2,099	16.3	
Ind. United Australia	Augustine Marshall	2,031	15.8	
Country	Arie Dorsman	1,682	13.1	
Country	Marcus Hyndes	1,596	12.4	
Total formal votes		12,878	96.8	
Informal votes		433	3.3	
Turnout		13,311	90.1	
Two-party-preferred result
Country	D'Arcy Rose	6,489	50.4	
Labor	James Russell	6,389	49.6	
Country hold		Swing		

Malcolm Brown (Country) died.

==== 1938 ====
1938 New South Wales state election: Upper Hunter
Party	Candidate	Votes	%	±%
Country	Malcolm Brown	unopposed		
Country hold				

==== 1935 ====
1935 New South Wales state election: Upper Hunter
Party	Candidate	Votes	%	±%
Country	Malcolm Brown	7,573	54.0	−2.4
Labor (NSW)	John Wood	4,274	30.5	+4.0
Ind. United Australia	William Chapman	2,178	15.5	+15.5
Total formal votes		14,025	98.5	−0.2
Informal votes		211	1.5	+0.2
Turnout		14,236	96.0	−0.3
Country hold		Swing	N/A	

- Preferences were not distributed.

==== 1932 ====
1932 New South Wales state election: Upper Hunter
Party	Candidate	Votes	%	±%
Country	Malcolm Brown	7,380	56.4	+56.4
Labor (NSW)	Joseph Shakespeare	3,467	26.5	−16.5
Independent	Arie Dorsman	2,232	17.1	+17.1
Total formal votes		13,079	98.7	+1.9
Informal votes		176	1.3	−1.9
Turnout		13,255	96.3	−1.8
Country gain from United Australia		Swing	N/A	

William Cameron (Nationalist) died and Malcolm Brown (Independent Country) won the resulting by-election, standing as a Country candidate at this election.

==== 1931 by-election ====
1931 Upper Hunter by-election Saturday 13 June
Party	Candidate	Votes	%	±%
Nationalist	Alister McMullin	5,216	45.7	−10.6
Independent Country	Malcolm Brown	3,964	34.7	
Independent Labor	Percy Forsyth	2,173	19.0	
Communist	William Richards	65	0.6	
Total formal votes		11,418	96.6	−0.2
Informal votes		406	3.4	+0.2
Turnout		11,824	89.6 (Note: based on a roll of 13,202 at the 1930 election.)	−8.5
Two-party-preferred result
Independent Country	Malcolm Brown	6,078	52.5	
Nationalist	Alister McMullin	5,494	47.5	
Independent Country gain from Nationalist		Swing		

William Cameron (Nationalist) died.

==== 1930 ====
1930 New South Wales state election: Upper Hunter
Party	Candidate	Votes	%	±%
Nationalist	William Cameron	7,052	56.3	
Labor	Albert Burns	5,383	43.0	
Communist	Henry Scanlon	96	0.8	
Total formal votes		12,531	96.8	
Informal votes		417	3.2	
Turnout		12,948	98.1	
Nationalist hold		Swing		

=== Elections in the 1920s ===
==== 1927 ====
This section is an excerpt from 1927 New South Wales state election § Upper Hunter

1927 New South Wales state election: Upper Hunter
Party	Candidate	Votes	%	±%
Nationalist	William Cameron	7,561	66.3	
Labor	James Russell	3,843	33.7	
Total formal votes		11,404	98.6	
Informal votes		163	1.4	
Turnout		11,567	81.9	
Nationalist win		(new seat)		

==== 1920–1927 ====
District abolished

=== Elections in the 1910s ===
==== 1918 by-election ====
1918 Upper Hunter by-election Saturday 8 June
Party	Candidate	Votes	%	±%
Nationalist	William Cameron	4,010	51.8	−3.9
Labor	Sam Toombs	3,732	48.2	+3.9
Total formal votes		7,742	100.0	+1.0
Informal votes		0	0.0	−1.0
Turnout		7,742	63.5	+2.9
Nationalist hold		Swing		

Mac Abbott (Nationalist) resigned.

==== 1917 ====
This section is an excerpt from 1917 New South Wales state election § Upper Hunter

1917 New South Wales state election: Upper Hunter
Party	Candidate	Votes	%	±%
Nationalist	Mac Abbott	3,811	55.7	+5.6
Labor	Robert Kennedy	3,034	44.3	+2.8
Total formal votes		6,845	99.0	+2.0
Informal votes		66	1.0	−2.0
Turnout		6,911	60.7	−11.7
Nationalist hold		Swing	+5.6	

==== 1913 ====
This section is an excerpt from 1913 New South Wales state election § Upper Hunter

1913 New South Wales state election: Upper Hunter
Party	Candidate	Votes	%	±%
Farmers and Settlers	Mac Abbott (Note: Also endorsed by Liberal Reform.)	3,803	50.1	
Labor	George Cann	3,149	41.5	
Independent Liberal	Henry Willis	640	8.4	
Total formal votes		7,592	97.0	
Informal votes		233	3.0	
Turnout		7,825	72.4	
Farmers and Settlers gain from Liberal Reform				

The sitting member was Henry Willis (Liberal Reform) who stood as an independent, describing himself as a radical liberal.

==== 1910 ====
This section is an excerpt from 1910 New South Wales state election § The Upper Hunter

1910 New South Wales state election: The Upper Hunter
Party	Candidate	Votes	%	±%
Liberal Reform	Henry Willis	3,225	51.9	
Labour	William Ashford	2,995	48.2	
Total formal votes		6,220	98.7	
Informal votes		84	1.3	
Turnout		6,304	74.6	
Liberal Reform gain from Labour				

==== 1910 by-election ====
1910 The Upper Hunter by-election Wednesday 13 April
Party	Candidate	Votes	%	±%
Labor	William Ashford	2,365	54.4	+8.0
Liberal Reform	James Waller	1,979	45.6	−4.2
Total formal votes		4,344	98.6	+1.2
Informal votes		62	1.4	−1.2
Turnout		4,406	62.7 (Note: based on an electoral roll of 7,028 at the 1907 election.)	−4.8
Labor gain from Liberal Reform		Swing		

William Fleming (Liberal Reform) resigned to unsuccessfully contest the federal seat of New England.

=== Elections in the 1900s ===
==== 1907 ====
This section is an excerpt from 1907 New South Wales state election § The Upper Hunter

1907 New South Wales state election: The Upper Hunter
Party	Candidate	Votes	%	±%
Liberal Reform	William Fleming	2,301	49.8	
Labour	William Ashford	2,146	46.4	
Independent	Edward Eagar	117	2.5	
Independent	Wilfred Young	57	1.2	
Total formal votes		4,621	97.4	
Informal votes		123	2.6	
Turnout		4,744	67.5	
Liberal Reform hold				

==== 1904 ====
This section is an excerpt from 1904 New South Wales state election § The Upper Hunter

1904 New South Wales state election: The Upper Hunter
Party	Candidate	Votes	%	±%
Liberal Reform	William Fleming	2,742	60.5	
Progressive	John Treflé	1,787	39.5	
Total formal votes		4,529	98.8	
Informal votes		54	1.2	
Turnout		4,583	68.3	
Liberal Reform hold				

The Upper Hunter was a re-created seat which comprised parts of the abolished seats of Robertson and Rylstone. William Fleming (Liberal Reform) was the member for Robertson and the member for Rylstone was John Fitzpatrick (Liberal Reform) who unsuccessfully contested Northumberland.

==== 1894–1904 ====
District abolished

==== 1891 ====
This section is an excerpt from 1891 New South Wales colonial election § The Upper Hunter

1891 New South Wales colonial election: The Upper Hunter Wednesday 24 June
Party	Candidate	Votes	%	±%
Labour	Thomas Williams (elected 1)	1,087	32.5	
Protectionist	Robert Fitzgerald (re-elected 2)	1,071	32.0	
Protectionist	William Abbott (defeated)	522	15.6	
Free Trade	John McElhone	496	14.8	
Free Trade	Frederick Morris	174	5.2	
Total formal votes		3,350	99.4	
Informal votes		19	0.6	
Turnout		2,044	59.9	
Labour gain 1 from Protectionist				
Protectionist hold 1				

=== Elections in the 1880s ===
==== 1889 ====
This section is an excerpt from 1889 New South Wales colonial election § The Upper Hunter

1889 New South Wales colonial election: The Upper Hunter Monday 4 February
Party	Candidate	Votes	%	±%
Protectionist	Robert Fitzgerald (elected 1)	925	38.9	
Protectionist	William Abbott (elected 2)	831	35.0	
Protectionist	Thomas Hungerford	620	26.1	
Total formal votes		2,376	99.5	
Informal votes		13	0.5	
Turnout		1,495	49.1	
Protectionist hold 1 and gain 1 from Free Trade				

One of the sitting members John McElhone (Free Trade) did not contest the election. Robert Fitzgerald (Protectionist) was the other sitting member

==== 1887 ====
This section is an excerpt from 1887 New South Wales colonial election § The Upper Hunter

1887 New South Wales colonial election: The Upper Hunter Friday 18 February
Party	Candidate	Votes	%	±%
Free Trade	John McElhone (elected 1)	984	36.7	
Free Trade	Robert FitzGerald (re-elected 2)	599	22.4	
Protectionist	William Abbott	549	20.5	
Free Trade	Thomas Hungerford (defeated)	548	20.5	
Total formal votes		2,680	99.8	
Informal votes		6	0.2	
Turnout		1,637	57.0	

==== 1885 ====
This section is an excerpt from 1885 New South Wales colonial election § The Upper Hunter

1885 New South Wales colonial election: The Upper Hunter Monday 26 October
Candidate	Votes	%
Robert Fitzgerald (elected 1)	910	37.3
Thomas Hungerford (elected 2)	776	31.8
John McElhone (defeated)	756	31.0
Total formal votes	2,442	99.5
Informal votes	12	0.5
Turnout	1,591	56.4

==== 1883 by-election ====
1883 Upper Hunter by-election Tuesday 6 March
Candidate	Votes	%
John McElhone (elected)	516	37.8
Robert Fitzgerald	460	33.7
James Wilshire	216	15.8
Alexander Bowman	173	12.7
Informal votes	1,365	100.0
Informal votes	0	0.0
Turnout	1,365	51.2

John McElhone resigned to challenge Adolphus Taylor for his seat of Mudgee. McElhone was defeated at the by-election for Mudgee which was conducted on the same day.

==== 1882 ====
This section is an excerpt from 1882 New South Wales colonial election § The Upper Hunter

1882 New South Wales colonial election: The Upper Hunter Thursday 14 December
Candidate	Votes	%
John McElhone (re-elected 1)	1,016	36.4
John McLaughlin (re-elected 2)	941	33.7
James Wilshire	496	17.8
Thomas Hungerford (defeated)	337	12.1
Total formal votes	2,790	99.5
Informal votes	15	0.5
Turnout	1,667	62.5

John McElhone had already been elected for East Sydney. Thomas Hungerford was a sitting member for Northumberland.

==== 1880 ====
This section is an excerpt from 1880 New South Wales colonial election § The Upper Hunter

1880 New South Wales colonial election: The Upper Hunter Tuesday 30 November
Candidate	Votes	%
John McElhone (re-elected 1)	1,050	37.2
John McLaughlin (elected 2)	979	34.7
William Clendinning	791	28.1
Total formal votes	2,820	99.5
Informal votes	15	0.5
Turnout	2,835	51.1
	(1 new seat)	

=== Elections in the 1870s ===
==== 1877 ====
This section is an excerpt from 1877 New South Wales colonial election § The Upper Hunter

1877 New South Wales colonial election: The Upper Hunter Saturday 3 November
Candidate	Votes	%
John McElhone (re-elected)	1,169	71.9
Sir John Robertson	456	28.1
Total formal votes	1,625	100.0
Informal votes	0	0.0
Turnout	1,651	50.4

==== 1875 by-election 2 ====
1875 The Upper Hunter by-election Thursday 5 August
Candidate	Votes	%
John McElhone (elected)	1,057	54.9
Thomas Hungerford	869	45.1
Total formal votes	1,926	99.2
Informal votes	15	0.8
Turnout	1,941	64.3

The June by-election was overturned by the Election and Qualifications Committee because two polls were taken at Belltrees.

==== 1875 by-election 1 ====
1875 The Upper Hunter by-election Monday 7 June
Candidate	Votes	%
Thomas Hungerford (elected)	771	44.4
John McElhone	726	41.8
Oliver Saunders	97	5.6
Patrick Jennings	88	5.1
William Gordon	31	1.8
Archibald Hamilton	22	1.3
Total formal votes	1,735	100.0
Informal votes	0	0.0
Turnout	1,735	57.4

Francis White died. The by-election was overturned by the Election and Qualifications Committee because two polls were taken at Belltrees.

==== 1874 ====
This section is an excerpt from 1874-75 New South Wales colonial election § The Upper Hunter

1874–75 New South Wales colonial election: The Upper Hunter Monday 28 December 1874
Candidate	Votes	%
Francis White (elected)	673	52.3
Thomas Hungerford	331	25.7
John Smart	153	11.9
William Gordon	129	10.0
Total formal votes	1,286	100.0
Informal votes	0	0.0
Turnout	1,286	46.0

==== 1872 ====
This section is an excerpt from 1872 New South Wales colonial election § The Upper Hunter

1872 New South Wales colonial election: The Upper Hunter Thursday 29 February
Candidate	Votes	%
John Creed (elected)	845	56.1
James White	661	43.9
Total formal votes	1,506	95.5
Informal votes	71	4.5
Turnout	1,577	57.8

=== Elections in the 1860s ===
==== 1869 ====
This section is an excerpt from 1869-70 New South Wales colonial election § The Upper Hunter

1869–70 New South Wales colonial election: The Upper Hunter Thursday 16 December 1869
Candidate	Votes	%
Archibald Bell (re-elected)	510	63.2
William Gordon	297	36.8
Total formal votes	807	100.0
Informal votes	0	0.0
Turnout	807	32.4

==== 1868 by-election ====
1868 Upper Hunter by-election Saturday 6 June (Note: The declaration of the poll had Archibald Bell with a majority of 248 votes, however the final results for Jerry's Plains do not appear to have been reported and are not included in the table.)
Candidate	Votes	%
Archibald Bell (elected)	591	59.1
Thomas Dangar	383	38.3
William Gordon	20	2.0
Sydney Drewe	6	0.6
Total formal votes	1,000	100.0
Informal votes	0	0.0
Turnout	1,000	40.3

James White resigned.

==== 1864 ====
This section is an excerpt from 1864–65 New South Wales colonial election § The Upper Hunter

1864–65 New South Wales colonial election: The Upper Hunter Thursday 15 December 1864
Candidate	Votes	%
James White (elected)	601	65.2
Thomas Dangar (defeated)	283	30.7
William Gordon	38	4.1
Total formal votes	922	100.0
Informal votes	0	0.0
Turnout	922	54.9

==== 1861 by-election ====
1861 Upper Hunter by-election Monday 15 April
Candidate	Votes	%
Thomas Dangar (elected)	163	35.8
William Gordon	104	22.9
Alexander Johnston	108	23.7
Donald McIntyre	80	17.6
Total formal votes	455	100.0
Informal votes	0	0.0
Turnout	455	34.1

John Robertson resigned to be appointed to the Legislative Council to ensure the passage of the Robertson Land Acts into law.

==== 1860 ====
This section is an excerpt from 1860 New South Wales colonial election § The Upper Hunter

1860 New South Wales colonial election: The Upper Hunter Monday 10 December
Candidate	Votes	%
John Robertson (re-elected)	unopposed	

=== Elections in the 1850s ===
==== 1859 ====
This section is an excerpt from 1859 New South Wales colonial election § The Upper Hunter

1859 New South Wales colonial election: The Upper Hunter Friday 24 June
Candidate	Votes	%
John Robertson (re-elected)	356	73.6
Thomas Dangar	112	23.1
Daniel Deniehy	16	3.3
Total formal votes	484	100.0
Informal votes	0	0.0
Turnout	484	47.1
