= 1868 Upper Hunter colonial by-election =

By-election in New South Wales, Australia

A by-election was held for the New South Wales Legislative Assembly electorate of Upper Hunter on 3 July 1868 due to the resignation of sitting member James White, who left the colony to travel to England, Europe and the United States.

== Dates ==
| Date | Event |
|---|---|
| 8 May 1868 | James White resigned. |
| 18 May 1868 | Writ of election issued by the Speaker of the Legislative Assembly. |
| 2 June 1868 | Nominations |
| 6 June 1868 | Polling day |
| 15 June 1868 | Return of writ |
| 24 June 1868 | Poll held at Jerry's Plains as no poll was held there on 6 June. |
| 21 August 1868 | Election proclaimed valid despite not being returned by 15 June. |

== Results ==
1868 Upper Hunter by-election Saturday 6 June (Note: The declaration of the poll had Archibald Bell with a majority of 248 votes, however the final results for Jerry's Plains do not appear to have been reported and are not included in the table.)
| Candidate | Votes | % |
|---|---|---|
| Archibald Bell (elected) | 591 | 59.1 |
| Thomas Dangar | 383 | 38.3 |
| William Gordon | 20 | 2.0 |
| Sydney Drewe | 6 | 0.6 |
| Total formal votes | 1,000 | 100.0 |
| Informal votes | 0 | 0.0 |
| Turnout | 1,000 | 40.3 |

== See also ==
- Electoral results for the district of Upper Hunter
- List of New South Wales state by-elections
