= Electoral results for the district of Robertson =

Election results for Robertson, New South Wales, Australia

Robertson, an electoral district of the Legislative Assembly in the Australian state of New South Wales, was created in 1894 and abolished in 1904.

Election	Member	Party
1894	Robert Fitzgerald	Protectionist
1895	Robert Fitzgerald	Protectionist
1898	Robert Fitzgerald	National Federal
1901	William Fleming	Liberal Reform

== Election results ==
=== Elections in the 1900s ===
==== 1901 ====
1901 New South Wales state election: Robertson
Party	Candidate	Votes	%	±%
Liberal Reform	William Fleming	1,017	50.7	+12.3
Progressive	Robert Fitzgerald (defeated)	991	49.4	−12.3
Total formal votes		2,008	98.8	+0.4
Informal votes		24	1.2	−0.4
Turnout		2,032	68.3	+6.6
Liberal Reform gain from Progressive				

=== Elections in the 1890s ===
==== 1898 ====
1898 New South Wales colonial election: Robertson
Party	Candidate	Votes	%	±%
National Federal	Robert Fitzgerald	1,055	61.7	
Free Trade	Thomas Houghton	656	38.3	
Total formal votes		1,711	98.5	
Informal votes		27	1.6	
Turnout		1,738	61.8	
National Federal hold				

==== 1895 ====
1895 New South Wales colonial election: Robertson
Party	Candidate	Votes	%	±%
Protectionist	Robert Fitzgerald	1,052	58.5	
Labour	Francis Gilbert	738	41.1	
Ind. Free Trade	Thomas Johnston	8	0.4	
Total formal votes		1,798	98.5	
Informal votes		27	1.5	
Turnout		1,825	71.0	
Protectionist hold				

==== 1894 ====
1894 New South Wales colonial election: Robertson
Party	Candidate	Votes	%	±%
Protectionist	Robert Fitzgerald	903	46.6	
Free Trade	Edwin Tucker	900	46.4	
Ind. Protectionist	Michael Hickey	137	7.1	
Total formal votes		1,940	97.9	
Informal votes		41	2.1	
Turnout		1,981	77.1	
Protectionist win		(new seat)		
