= 1875 Upper Hunter colonial by-election =

1875 Upper Hunter colonial by-election may refer to

- June 1875 Upper Hunter colonial by-election caused by the death of Francis White
- August 1875 Upper Hunter colonial by-election because the June by-election was overturned by the Election and Qualifications Committee

== See also ==
- List of New South Wales state by-elections
