= 1861 Upper Hunter colonial by-election =

By-election in New South Wales, Australia

A by-election was held for the New South Wales Legislative Assembly electorate of Upper Hunter on 15 April 1861 because of the resignation of John Robertson. Roberston had resigned as Premier on 9 January 1861 to concentrate on the passage of the Robertson Land Acts, which would open up the free selection of Crown land. The bills were passed by the Legislative Assembly on 26 March 1861, and Robertson resigned to be appointed to the Legislative Council to ensure their passage into law.

== Dates ==
Date	Event
9 January 1861	John Robertson resigned as Premier.
26 March 1861	Robertson Land Acts passed by the Legislative Assembly.
28 March 1861	John Robertson resigned as member for Upper Hunter. Writ of election issued by the Speaker of the Legislative Assembly.
11 April 1861	Nominations
15 April 1861	Polling day
20 April 1861	Return of writ

== Results ==
1861 Upper Hunter by-election Monday 15 April
Candidate	Votes	%
Thomas Dangar (elected)	163	35.8
William Gordon	104	22.9
Alexander Johnston	108	23.7
Donald McIntyre	80	17.6
Total formal votes	455	100.0
Informal votes	0	0.0
Turnout	455	34.1

== Aftermath ==
The Robertson Lands Acts became law on 18 October 1861. John Robertson resigned from the Legislative Council on 30 December 1861, and returned to the Legislative Assembly on 7 January 1862, unopposed at the 1862 Shoalhaven by-election.

== See also ==
- Electoral results for the district of Upper Hunter
- List of New South Wales state by-elections
