= 1970 Upper Hunter state by-election =

Election result for Upper Hunter, New South Wales, Australia

The 1970 Upper Hunter state by-election was held on 14 February 1970 for the New South Wales Legislative Assembly seat of Upper Hunter. It was triggered by the resignation of Frank O'Keefe (Country) to successfully contest the federal seat of Paterson at the 1969 election.

== Dates ==
Date	Event
22 September 1969	Resignation of Frank O'Keefe.
25 October 1969	1969 Australian federal election
19 January 1970	Writ of election issued by the Speaker of the Legislative Assembly and close of electoral rolls.
23 January 1970	Day of nomination
14 February 1970	Polling day
10 March 1970	Return of writ

== Results ==
1970 Upper Hunter by-election Saturday 14 February
Party	Candidate	Votes	%	±%
Labor	Roger Nott	8,501	44.1	+9.6
Country	Col Fisher	7,092	36.8	−28.6
Liberal	Ivor Peebles	3,666	19.0	
Total formal votes		19,259	99.0	−0.1
Informal votes		196	1.0	+0.1
Turnout		19,455	90.4	−5.6
Two-party-preferred result
Country	Col Fisher	9,929	51.6	−13.9
Labor	Roger Nott	9,330	48.4	+13.9
Country hold		Swing	−13.9	

== See also ==
- Electoral results for the district of Upper Hunter
- List of New South Wales state by-elections
