= 1883 Upper Hunter colonial by-election =

By-election in New South Wales, Australia

The 1883 Upper Hunter colonial by-election was held on 6 March 1883 for the New South Wales Legislative Assembly electorate of Upper Hunter because of the resignation of John McElhone after a heated argument with the member for Mudgee Adolphus Taylor in which McElhone challenged Taylor to resign and both would contest Taylor's seat. The Newcastle Morning Herald and Miners' Advocate reported that despite McElhone saying he would not stand for Upper Hunter, he had been nominated without his authority.

== Dates ==
Date	Event
22 February 1883	Writ of election issued by the Speaker of the Legislative Assembly and close of electoral rolls.
3 March 1883	Nominations
6 March 1883	Polling day
13 March 1883	Return of writ

== Results ==
1883 Upper Hunter by-election Tuesday 6 March
Candidate	Votes	%
John McElhone (elected)	516	37.8
Robert Fitzgerald	460	33.7
James Wilshire	216	15.8
Alexander Bowman	173	12.7
Informal votes	1,365	100.0
Informal votes	0	0.0
Turnout	1,365	51.2

John McElhone was defeated at the by-election for Mudgee which was conducted on the same day.

== See also ==
- Electoral results for the district of Upper Hunter
- List of New South Wales state by-elections
