= 1931 Upper Hunter state by-election =

Election result for Upper Hunter, New South Wales, Australia

The 1931 Upper Hunter state by-election was held on 13 June 1931 for the New South Wales Legislative Assembly electorate of Upper Hunter because of the death of William Cameron (Nationalist). The Country Party did not nominate an official candidate because the seat had been held by the Nationalist Party. Malcolm Brown was nominated as an independent country candidate, and was supported in his campaign by the leader of the Country Party, Michael Bruxner.

== Dates ==
Date	Event
6 May 1939	Death of William Cameron.
18 May 1931	Writ of election issued by the Speaker of the Legislative Assembly.
26 May 1931	Nominations
13 June 1931	Polling day
27 June 1931	Return of writ

== Results ==
1931 Upper Hunter by-election Saturday 13 June
Party	Candidate	Votes	%	±%
Nationalist	Alister McMullin	5,216	45.7	−10.6
Independent Country	Malcolm Brown	3,964	34.7	
Independent Labor	Percy Forsyth	2,173	19.0	
Communist	William Richards	65	0.6	
Total formal votes		11,418	96.6	−0.2
Informal votes		406	3.4	+0.2
Turnout		11,824	89.6 (Note: based on a roll of 13,202 at the 1930 election.)	−8.5
Two-party-preferred result
Independent Country	Malcolm Brown	6,078	52.5	
Nationalist	Alister McMullin	5,494	47.5	
Independent Country gain from Nationalist		Swing		

Malcom Brown won the seat on Labor preferences, and joined the Country Party once he entered Parliament.

== See also ==
- Electoral results for the district of Upper Hunter
- List of New South Wales state by-elections
