= 1918 Upper Hunter state by-election =

Election result for Upper Hunter, New South Wales, Australia

A by-election was held in the New South Wales state electoral district of Upper Hunter on 8 June 1918. The by-election was triggered by the resignation of Mac Abbott (Nationalist).

Abbott had been re-elected on a pro-conscriptionist platform at the 1917 state election, despite his electorate voting "No" in the 1916 referendum on overseas service for conscripted soldiers. During his re-election campaign he publicly committed to resigning his seat if another "No" vote was returned at the repeat referendum in 1917. He kept his promise by resigning his seat on 10 May 1918 and returned to his legal practice.

== Dates ==
Date	Event
10 May 1918	Resignation of Mac Abbott.
14 May 1918	Writ of election issued by the Speaker of the Legislative Assembly.
21 May 1918	Nominations
8 June 1918	Polling day
25 June 1918	Return of writ

== Results ==
1918 Upper Hunter by-election Saturday 8 June
Party	Candidate	Votes	%	±%
Nationalist	William Cameron	4,010	51.8	−3.9
Labor	Sam Toombs	3,732	48.2	+3.9
Total formal votes		7,742	100.0	+1.0
Informal votes		0	0.0	−1.0
Turnout		7,742	63.5	+2.9
Nationalist hold		Swing		

== See also ==
- Electoral results for the district of Upper Hunter
- List of New South Wales state by-elections
