= August 1875 Upper Hunter colonial by-election =

By-election in New South Wales, Australia

A by-election was held for the New South Wales Legislative Assembly electorate of Upper Hunter on 5 August 1875 as the by-election that returned Thomas Hungerford was overturned by the Election and Qualifications Committee on the basis that two polls were taken at Belltrees.

== Dates ==
Date	Event
7 June 1875	Poll conducted, including at Belltrees
21 June 1875	Further poll conducted at Denison Town, Merry's Crossing, Wybong Reserve and Belltrees.
6 July 1875	John McElhone lodged a petition against the election.
12 July 1875	Election of Thomas Hungerford declared to be void.
13 July 1875	Writ of election issued by the Speaker of the Legislative Assembly.
29 July 1875	Nominations
5 August 1875	Polling day
23 August 1875	Return of writ

== Results ==
1875 The Upper Hunter by-election Thursday 5 August
Candidate	Votes	%
John McElhone (elected)	1,057	54.9
Thomas Hungerford	869	45.1
Total formal votes	1,926	99.2
Informal votes	15	0.8
Turnout	1,941	64.3

== Aftermath ==
Thomas Hungerford also lodged an unsuccessful petition, in which he alleged John McElhone committed acts of bribery and corruption by supplying electors with food, drink and transport.

== See also ==
- Electoral results for the district of Upper Hunter
- List of New South Wales state by-elections
