= 1910 Upper Hunter state by-election =

Election result for Upper Hunter, New South Wales, Australia

The 1910 Upper Hunter state by-election was held on 13 April 1910 for the New South Wales Legislative Assembly electorate of Upper Hunter. The by-election was triggered by the resignation of William Fleming (Liberal Reform) to unsuccessfully contest the federal seat of New England at the 1910 election.

The by-election and those for Darling Harbour and Queanbeyan were held on the same day as the 1910 Federal election.

== Dates ==
Date	Event
28 February 1910	William Fleming resigned.
8 March 1910	Writ of election issued by the Speaker of the Legislative Assembly.
23 March 1910	Nominations
13 April 1910	Polling day and 1910 Federal election
3 May 1910	Return of writ

== Results ==
1910 The Upper Hunter by-election Wednesday 13 April
Party	Candidate	Votes	%	±%
Labor	William Ashford	2,365	54.4	+8.0
Liberal Reform	James Waller	1,979	45.6	−4.2
Total formal votes		4,344	98.6	+1.2
Informal votes		62	1.4	−1.2
Turnout		4,406	62.7 (Note: based on an electoral roll of 7,028 at the 1907 election.)	−4.8
Labor gain from Liberal Reform		Swing		

== See also ==
- Electoral results for the district of Upper Hunter
- List of New South Wales state by-elections
