= 1939 Upper Hunter state by-election =

Election result for Upper Hunter, New South Wales, Australia

The 1939 Upper Hunter state by-election was held on 7 October 1939 for the New South Wales Legislative Assembly electorate of Upper Hunter because of the death of Malcolm Brown (Country). There were three candidates endorsed by the Country Party.

== Dates ==
Date	Event
29 August 1939	Death of Malcolm Brown.
11 September 1939	Writ of election issued by the Speaker of the Legislative Assembly.
19 September 1939	Nominations
7 October 1939	Polling day
21 October 1939	Return of writ

== Results ==
1939 Upper Hunter by-election Saturday 7 October
Party	Candidate	Votes	%	±%
Labor	James Russell	5,470	42.5	
Country	D'Arcy Rose	2,099	16.3	
Ind. United Australia	Augustine Marshall	2,031	15.8	
Country	Arie Dorsman	1,682	13.1	
Country	Marcus Hyndes	1,596	12.4	
Total formal votes		12,878	96.8	
Informal votes		433	3.3	
Turnout		13,311	90.1	
Two-party-preferred result
Country	D'Arcy Rose	6,489	50.4	
Labor	James Russell	6,389	49.6	
Country hold		Swing		

== See also ==
- Electoral results for the district of Upper Hunter
- List of New South Wales state by-elections
