= Fitzgerald Bridge (disambiguation) =

Fitzgerald Bridge is a bridge in Pune, India.

Fitzgerald Bridge may also refer to:

- Fitzgerald Bridge, Aberdeen, New South Wales, Australia
- Fitzgerald Bridge, Raymond Terrace, New South Wales, Australia
