= William Parr (explorer) =

Land surveyor, mineral surveyor, explorer in Australia

- Occupations: Land surveyor, draughtsman, mineral surveyor, explorer
- Known for: Exploring with John Oxley and Benjamin Singleton, and preparing the way for the successful expedition by John Howe

William Parr was an Australian explorer, known for his roles of mineralogist and cartographer with John Oxley, as expedition leader with Benjamin Singleton, and as trailblazer for the successful expedition by John Howe.

== Biography ==
He arrived in the colony of New South Wales as a convict in 1813, on the Fortune. He was a land surveyor and draughtsman by profession, and was employed on arrival by the Surveyor General's Department as a mineral surveyor. In 1817 he took part in two separate journeys of exploration.

=== Exploring with Oxley ===
In mid-1817 John Oxley led an expedition of 13 men (including himself) to follow the courses of the Lachlan and Macquarie Rivers. He was accompanied by Parr, who had been granted a ticket of leave by Governor Macquarie. Parr’s roles were those of mineralogist and cartographer, where he was responsible for production of a chart of the journey.

=== Expedition leader with Singleton ===
In October 1817, Parr set out in charge of a party of men including Benjamin Singleton and Aboriginal guides to find a route, suitable for wagons, to the Hunter River. They almost reached the Hunter Valley before turning back. Singleton was unhappy and had already turned back, leaving Parr to continue alone.

=== Trailblazing for Howe ===
When, in 1819, John Howe managed to reach the Hunter, he followed in part the route discovered by Parr and Singleton.

== Confusion with another William Parr ==
A convict named Thomas William Parr arrived in the colony of New South Wales as a convict in 1788, on the Alexander, a ship of the First Fleet. He is shown on the list of convicts of the First Fleet as William Parr, aged 47 years on embarkation.

In some sources the activities of the younger Parr (the subject of this article) have been incorrectly credited to the older Parr (who would have been about 76 years of age in 1817).
