= Thomas Williams (New South Wales politician) =

Australian politician

Thomas Henry Williams
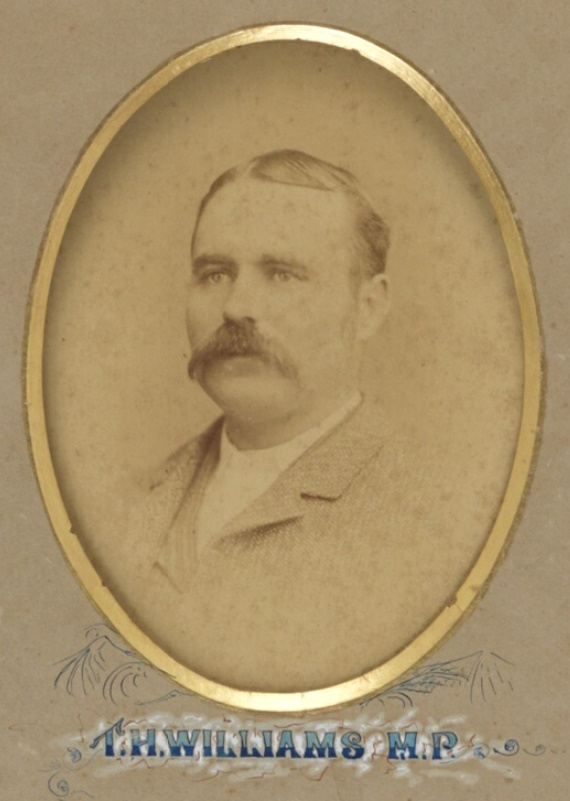

Member for Upper Hunter (NSW Legislative Assembly)
- In office 24 June 1891 – 25 June 1894

Personal details
- Born: 2 May 1862 Goulburn, New South Wales
- Died: 6 June 1953 (aged 91) Goulburn, New South Wales
- Parents: Thomas Williams (father); Mary (née Williams) (mother)

Thomas Henry Williams (2 May 1862 – 6 June 1953) was an English-born Australian union organiser and politician.

Williams joined the Amalgamated Shearers' Union (ASU) when it was formed in January 1887 and worked as a travelling union agent, encouraging union membership and organising strikes to enforce union terms and conditions on pastoral properties.

In June 1891 Williams was amongst the initial group of Labor Party members elected to the New South Wales Legislative Assembly. He represented the Upper Hunter electorate in the New South Wales Legislative Assembly for one term to July 1894, as a member of the Labor Electoral League (though he consistently refused to sign Labor's caucus solidarity pledge).

Williams was elected first president of the Australian Workers' Union (AWU) in 1894 for a one-year term. In later years he worked for an independent protectionist member of parliament.

== Biography ==
=== Early life ===
Thomas Henry Williams was born on 2 May 1862 at Ludgvan, county Cornwall in England, the eldest child of Thomas Prous Williams and Mary (née Williams).

Williams emigrated to Australia, aged eight, with his parents and five siblings. The family arrived at Melbourne, in the colony of Victoria, in July 1870 aboard the Alumbagh.

The Williams family eventually settled in the Castlemaine district in central Victoria.

=== Australia ===
As a young adult Williams spent twelve months droving stock to Queensland. In the early 1880s he went to Western Australia where he lost all his savings on speculative activities associated with the gold discoveries in that colony. Williams returned to Melbourne, working his passage aboard a steamer as a cook.

After his return to south-east Australia Tom Williams found employment on pastoral properties, engaged in activities such as fencing, tank-sinking and shearing. After his election to parliament in 1891 Williams was described as "a shearer, a shearer's cook, a rouseabout, a fencer and splitter, a horsebreaker, an all-round bushman".

Williams joined the Amalgamated Shearers' Union (ASU) at its inception in January 1887 and for three years worked as a travelling agent for the union. At the annual meeting of the Wagga Wagga branch of the ASU in February 1888 it was explained that union agents were "appointed to travel the country and visit sheds at the commencement of the shearing, for the purpose of acting as leaders to the members, and endeavouring, where strikes had arisen, to effect an amicable settlement of the dispute". Tom Williams had been acting as a voluntary agent in the Hay district before he was formally appointed as a union agent, operating in the western portion of the country under the control of the Wagga branch. At the meeting he was one of three delegates elected to represent the Wagga branch at the ASU conference at Echuca in March 1888. Williams' duties as the travelling union agent also involved calling out and organising strikes involving unionised shearers, as he did with success at 'Llanillo' station in the Walgett district in late July and early August 1888. At a meeting convened at Narrabri in September 1888 Williams was the featured speaker who explained "the objects of the union" to an audience of "some sheepowners, shearers – non-union and unionists – and a number of townspeople".

Thomas H. Williams and Rosina Victoria Beaudoin were married on 9 February 1889 in the Wesleyan church at Hay, in the western Riverina district of New South Wales. The couple had eight children born from May 1890 to July 1904.

From 1889 Williams served as secretary of the Scone branch of the ASU. During the 1890 mid-year shearing season there were ongoing negotiations between the Shearers' Union and the Pastoralists' Union of New South Wales, formed in July 1890 to resist the demands of the ASU, regarding the acceptance of union shearers and wages and conditions on stations in the Murrurundi sheep district. The leading district negotiator for the Pastoralists' Union was the wealthy pastoralist, William E. Abbott. His thirty thousand acre 'Abbotsford' estate near Wingen, incorporating 'Glengarry' and 'Murrulla' stations, was one of the most valuable sheep runs in the Upper Hunter district. Abbott was also one of the sitting members for the Upper Hunter electorate in the New South Wales Legislative Assembly. Brisbane's The Worker newspaper described Abbott as "one of the bitterest anti-unionists in N.S.W.".

=== Political career ===
In February 1891 Williams was elected as an alderman of Scone Municipal Council.

The negotiations between the Pastoralists' Union and the ASU during the 1890 shearing season had forestalled any strike action in the Murrurundi sheep district. The Shearers' Union claimed that "a large number of sheds" had accepted union terms and two-thirds of the district sheep were shorn by union labour. The lead negotiators on both sides, Williams and Abbott, had begun a letter writing campaign to local and metropolitan newspapers that continued into the early months of 1891, the writers explaining their respective points of view and often rebutting the words of the other party. By the early months of 1891 the exchange of correspondence between Williams and Abbott has become increasingly antagonistic and personal.

On 23 April 1891 Williams, in his role as secretary of the Scone branch of the ASU, told the Trades and Labour Council that he was "taking a tour through the Hunter electorate for the purpose of forming Labor Leagues".

In early June 1891 it was reported that four candidates had been announced to contest the Upper Hunter electorate, namely the protectionist Robert G. D. Fitzgerald (one of the two sitting members), John McElhone and Frederick Morris, both free-traders, and Williams "in the labor interest". At that stage William Abbott, the other protectionist member, had not announced his intention, but it was "generally understood he will contest the electorate". The newspaper report concluded: "The election will probably be a very exciting one".

The 1891 general election in New South Wales, held in June and early July 1891, saw the first electoral successes of the Labor Party (then known as the Labor Electoral League of New South Wales). At that time the Upper Hunter electorate returned two members of parliament and a total of five candidates were nominated to fill the available seats, including the two sitting members, Abbott and Fitzgerald, both representatives of the Protectionist Party. At the election held on 24 June 1891 Williams topped the poll with 1,087 votes (32.5 percent), with Fitzgerald, one of the sitting members, in close second place. The defeated member, William Abbott, received 522 votes (15.6 percent).

After the election newspapers noted the class divide between the defeated member and the Labor newcomer. A columnist for the Windsor and Richmond Gazette wrote: "Just think of it; W. E. Abbott, the cast-iron champion of squatterdom in the Australian press and the N.S.W. Parliament, beaten at the ballot-box by, and having to hand his parliamentary pass over to, Williams, a shearer's cook!".

The newly-elected Labor Electoral League members attempted a form of "controlled solidarity" by requiring the signing of a pledge affirming that decisions made at caucus meetings would be binding on all parliamentary members, based on the trade union tradition of acceptance of decisions freely made at union meetings. At once eight of the Labor members elected to the Legislative Assembly, including Williams, refused to sign the pledge "because of promises to favour protection they had given while campaigning". A compromise was afterwards reached to the effect that no Labor member should propose fiscal policy changes until the matter had been decided by a referendum. The question of party solidarity and the signing of a pledge remained an issue for the Labor parliamentary members throughout the term of parliament from 1891 to 1894. There was no unanimity of opinion amongst the Labor Party members on the fiscal issue of free trade versus protectionism (at that time the major parliamentary factions in the New South Wales parliament), and voting and debates on fiscal concerns often pitted the concept of party solidarity against members' personal beliefs and their constituents' interests. During the parliamentary term Williams continued to refuse the pledge, though he maintained his connections to the Labor Electoral League and the union movement.

In February 1894 Williams was elected president of the Australian Workers' Union (AWU), formed from an amalgamation of the Shearers' Union and the General Laborers' Union. In February 1895 Arthur Rae replaced Williams as president of the AWU.

Williams was listed as the Labor Electoral League candidate for the seat of Robertson as late as June 1894. However, at the general election held the following month, no Labor candidate contested the election for that seat. Williams was the only one of the original thirty-six Labor members elected to the Legislative Assembly who did not contest a seat at the 1894 general election.

Williams was listed as a candidate in the by-election held for the seat of Rylstone on 14 October 1895. In the previous poll, held on 17 July 1895 in a general election, significant irregularities were identified causing the Elections and Qualifications Committee to overturn the result and call a by-election. The sitting member and free-trade candidate, John Fitzpatrick, was returned at the by-election. Williams, who was listed as an independent or independent labor candidate, initially campaigned on the strength of his connection with the Australian Workers' Union (which had absorbed the Amalgamated Shearers' Union). In the end he received just 14 votes, though he had withdrawn from the contest in the days before the poll was held.

=== Later life ===
In the electorate of Quirindi at the 1898 general election Williams campaigned for Harry Levien, the sitting member and independent protectionist candidate. In a closely fought contest against the Labor candidate, John Perry, Levien won with 53.8 percent of the vote. In a report of the result in The Worker newspaper it was stated that "the most contemptible means were resorted to" in defeating Perry. During the campaign Williams spoke at two places in support of Levien during which "the basest accusations were made against" the Labor candidate. In September 1899 it was reported that Williams was employed in the office of Harry Levien, the member for Quirindi in the New South Wales Legislative Assembly.

In 1904 Williams was living at Narrandera, on the Murrumbidgee River.

Williams' wife Rosina died on 1 May 1946 at Randwick.

Thomas Henry Williams died on 6 June 1953 at Newtown, an inner suburb of Sydney, aged 91.

New South Wales Legislative Assembly
Preceded by William Abbott	Member for Upper Hunter; 1891–1894; Served alongside: Robert Fitzgerald	Abolished
