= June 1875 Upper Hunter colonial by-election =

By-election in New South Wales, Australia

A by-election was held for the New South Wales Legislative Assembly electorate of Upper Hunter on 7 June 1875 caused by the death of Francis White.

== Dates ==
Date	Event
4 May 1875	Death of Francis White.
12 May 1875	Writ of election issued by the Speaker of the Legislative Assembly.
31 May 1875	Nominations
7 June 1875	Polling day
21 June 1875	Return of writ

== Results ==
1875 The Upper Hunter by-election Monday 7 June
Candidate	Votes	%
Thomas Hungerford (elected)	771	44.4
John McElhone	726	41.8
Oliver Saunders	97	5.6
Patrick Jennings	88	5.1
William Gordon	31	1.8
Archibald Hamilton	22	1.3
Total formal votes	1,735	100.0
Informal votes	0	0.0
Turnout	1,735	57.4

The by-election was overturned by the Election and Qualifications Committee because two polls were taken at Belltrees.

== See also ==
- Electoral results for the district of Upper Hunter
- List of New South Wales state by-elections
