= 1883 Mudgee colonial by-election =

By-election in New South Wales, Australia

A by-election was held for the New South Wales Legislative Assembly electorate of Mudgee on 6 March 1883 because of the resignation of Adolphus Taylor after a heated argument with the member for Upper Hunter John McElhone in which McElhone challenged Taylor to resign and both would contest Taylor's seat.

== Dates ==
Date	Event
22 February 1883	Writ of election issued by the Speaker of the Legislative Assembly and close of electoral rolls.
3 March 1883	Nominations
6 March 1883	Polling day
13 March 1883	Return of writ

== Results ==
1883 Mudgee by-election Tuesday 13 March
Candidate	Votes	%
Adolphus Taylor (elected)	1,289	66.6
John McElhone	645	33.4
Total formal votes	1,934	100.0
Informal votes	0	0.0
Turnout	1,934	38.6

== Aftermath ==
McElhone was re-elected at the by-election for Upper Hunter which was conducted on the same day, with the Newcastle Morning Herald and Miners' Advocate reporting that McElhone had been nominated without his authority.

== See also ==
- Electoral results for the district of Mudgee
- List of New South Wales state by-elections
