= Archibald Bell Jr. =

English politician

Archibald Bell, Jr
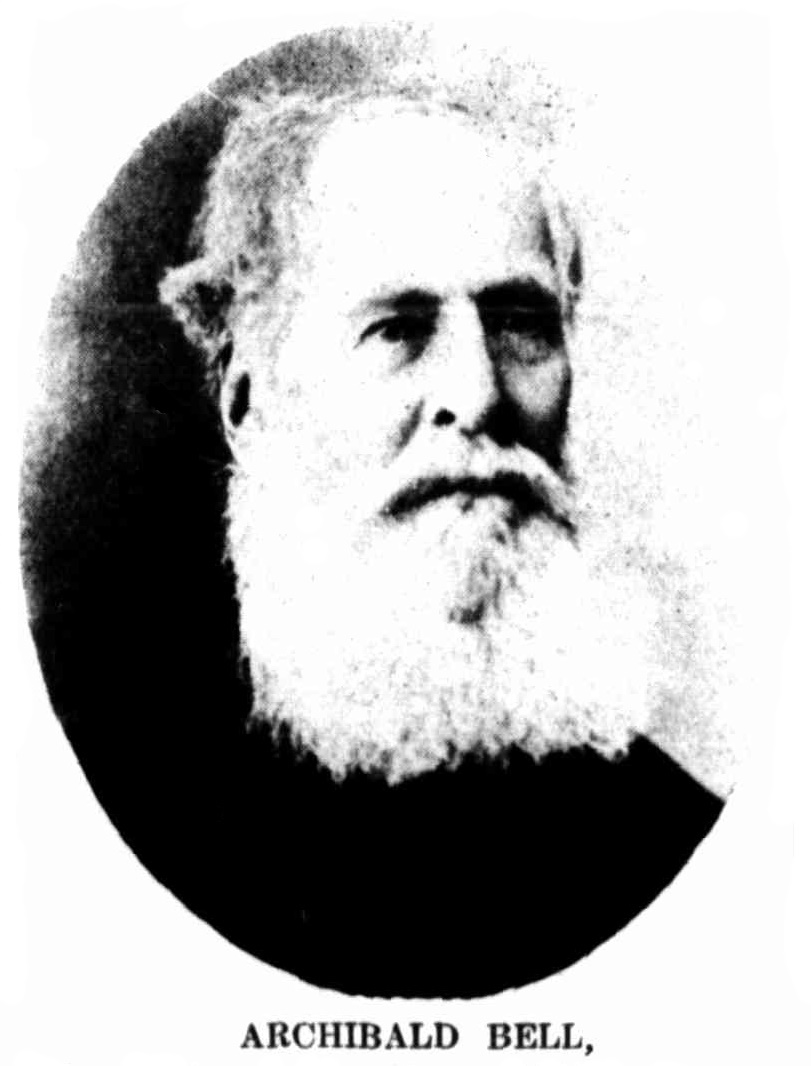
- Born: 15 April 1804; Hertfordshire, England, United Kingdom
- Died: 9 August 1883 (aged 79); Denman, New South Wales, Australia
- Occupations: Pastoralist, explorer
- Years active: 1823−1879
- Spouse: Francis Ann North
- Parents: Archibald Bell, Sr (father); Maria Kitching (mother)

Archibald Bell (15 April 1804 – 9 August 1883) was an English explorer and politician.

== Life and family ==
Archibald Bell was born on 15 April 1804 in county Hertfordshire, England, the son of Archibald Bell and Maria (née Kitching), one of ten children. He arrived in New South Wales with his family in July 1807 aboard the Young William, his father being an officer of the New South Wales Corps. Bell married Francis Ann North in 1833 at Windsor; Ann was the daughter of Lieutenant Samuel North, pastoralist and Police Magistrate for Windsor. Bell maintained his activities as a pastoralist in between explorations of Sydney's north-west.

== Exploration ==
In August 1823 Archibald Bell, aged nineteen years, traveled along the route that would later become the Bell's Line of Road. Although the mountains had been crossed at Katoomba a decade earlier, there was still no satisfactory route through the mountains from Richmond at this time. On the journey from Richmond to Mount Tomah Bell followed the directions of an Aboriginal woman who had travelled the route. Other sources claim Bell was shown the route by the Darug men, Emery and Cogy. He initially failed to find a safe descent to the west from Mount Tomah, but returned a month later and was able to travel into the Hartley valley where he joined up with Cox's road. Bell found the greatest difficulty on the journey "was in the thick part of his way to Tomah, so much so that in one place he was forced to cut his way through three miles". Bell used the Aboriginal term 'Balcamatta' to describe the country below Mount Tomah where he encountered difficulty proceeding.

Upon his return in September 1823 Archibald Bell sent his report of the route over the Blue Mountains to Governor Brisbane. Soon afterwards the surveyor-general John Oxley instructed his assistant-surveyor Robert Hoddle to survey Bell's line of road. Hoddle completed the task and his survey report was submitted in November 1823. The road across the mountains was soon afterwards cleared and formed by convict labour.

Bell also explored the Hunter River and saved the explorers Howe and Singleton from starvation. As a reward, he was given a grant of 1,000 acres (4 km^{2}) at Patrick's Plains, naming his estate 'Corinda'. He specialized in breeding horses for coaching and hackney horses. He was granted 1,000 acres (4 km^{2}) on the Hunter River near Belford in 1839. He had other estates in the Hunter Valley and moved from Corinda to Milgarra at Bunnan near Scone in 1849. In 1859 he bought Pickering at Denman, an 8,000 acres (32 km^{2}) freehold estate on the Hunter River. He lived there until his death on 9 August 1883.

Bell represented Upper Hunter in the New South Wales Legislative Assembly from 1868 to 1872 and was appointed to the Legislative Council for life in 1879.

The township of Bell, Mount Bell, the Bell Range and Bells Line of Road were named after the explorer.

New South Wales Legislative Assembly
Preceded by James White	Member for Upper Hunter; 1868 – 1872	Succeeded by John Creed
