= Archibald Bell Sr. =

English-born Australian politician

Archibald Bell (January 1773 – 23 April 1837) was an English-born Australian politician.

Archibald Bell was born in January 1773 at Cheshunt in Hertfordshire to the Nonconformist minister Archibald Bell. He married Maria Kitching in 1794; they had ten children. He was a schoolmaster for a time and in 1806 enlisted in the New South Wales Corps, arriving in Sydney with his family in July 1807 aboard the Young William. In New South Wales he was a magistrate and lieutenant, and settled near Richmond. From 1832 to 1837 he was a member of the New South Wales Legislative Council. One of his sons, Archibald, was also a New South Wales politician.

Archibald Bell Snr. died at Richmond on 23 April 1837.
