= Leon Punch =

Australian politician (1928-1991)

The Honourable Leon Punch

8th Deputy Premier of New South Wales
- In office 17 December 1975 – 14 May 1976
- Premier: Tom Lewis; Sir Eric Willis
- Preceded by: Sir Charles Cutler
- Succeeded by: Jack Ferguson

Member of the New South Wales Parliament for Upper Hunter
- In office 21 March 1959 – 3 March 1962
- Preceded by: D'Arcy Rose
- Succeeded by: Frank O'Keefe

Member of the New South Wales Parliament for Gloucester
- In office 3 March 1962 – 2 July 1985
- Preceded by: Ray Fitzgerald
- Succeeded by: Wendy Machin

Personal details
- Born: 21 April 1928 Inverell, New South Wales
- Died: 28 December 1991 (aged 63) Church Point, New South Wales, Australia
- Party: Country/National Party

Leon Ashton Punch (21 April 1928 – 28 December 1991) was a New South Wales politician, Deputy Premier, and Minister of the Crown in the cabinets of Sir Robert Askin, Tom Lewis and Sir Eric Willis. From 1975 to 1976 he was the Deputy Premier of New South Wales. He was a member of the New South Wales Legislative Assembly for 26 years from 21 March 1959 until his retirement on 2 July 1985 for the Country Party, renamed the National Party during his time.

== Early life ==
Punch was born in Inverell, New South Wales in 1928, the son of Thomas Sydney Punch, a local physician. He attended Inverell High School and The King's School, Parramatta. He worked on his family's properties in northeastern New South Wales from 1947 to 1959, first at Jerrys Plains and then at Barraba. At Barraba, he first entered politics in 1956 when he was elected as a Councillor on Barraba Shire Council, on which he served until he resigned to enter the state parliament in 1959. On 15 September 1960 he married Suzette Meyers and together had two sons.

== Early political career ==
On 16 February 1959, the Member for Upper Hunter, d'Arcy Rose, retired and Punch was preselcted to contest the seat for the Country Party. At the election on 21 March 1959, he won the seat, gaining 52.48% of the vote.

He represented Upper Hunter until 5 February 1962 when he contested the nearby seat of Gloucester at the 1962 election, which had been left vacant by the retirement of the sitting member, Ray Fitzgerald. Punch contested preselection for Gloucester against Alan Borthwick, who had contested Gloucester three years earlier, as an independent candidate. Borthwick won the ballot, but Punch appealed to the State Executive, claiming irregularities in the vote. The party eventually resolved the matter by endorsing both Borthwick and Punch for the election, creating the unusual situation where two Country Party candidates contested the same seat. Despite this, Borthwick was excluded on the second count and Punch was elected with 64.09% against Labor. Punch was re-elected a further eight times with a significant majority.

In 1966 he was appointed as a Councillor for the University of Newcastle, an office which he held until 1974. During his early political years he remained on the backbench and gained parliamentary experience as Chairman of Committees from 26 March 1968 to 13 January 1971 and 16 March 1971 to 17 January 1973.

== Minister of the Crown and Leader ==
Early in 1973 he was elected by his party as Deputy Leader (Sir Charles Cutler was still its leader) and on 17 January, the Premier, Sir Robert Askin, appointed him to succeed Sir Davis Hughes as Minister for Public Works, an office he was to hold through successive cabinets until the Coalition Government lost office on 14 May 1976. On 3 January 1975, the new Premier, Tom Lewis, appointed him as the first Minister for Ports which he also held until 14 May 1976. When Cutler retired on 16 December 1975, Punch was elected to succeed him as Leader of the National Country Party and as Deputy Premier the next day. He served as Deputy Premier of New South Wales, Minister for Public Works and Ports in the government of Sir Eric Willis until it was narrowly defeated at the 1976 election.

Punch remained as leader of the National Country Party (National Party from 1982) under successive Opposition Leaders but did not hold any shadow ministry. Following the landslide loss at the September 1981 election, the National Country Party and the Liberals both held 14 seats. Punch then contested the vacant Leadership of the Opposition, a move which was opposed by former Deputy Leader Tim Bruxner; but he lost to the new leader of the Liberals, John Dowd, whom Punch considered too far left-wing on matters of human rights. Punch had a reputation as a strong debater and was recognised as one of the few people who could match the style of Premier Neville Wran.

On 6 April 1984 Nick Greiner, who the previous year had deposed Dowd as Opposition Leader, appointed Punch the Shadow Minister for Public Works and Ports. Possessing socially conservative views, Punch was vehemently opposed to the gay liberation movement that pushed for reform of laws which criminalised homosexuality. Punch in particular opposed the landmark 'Crimes (Amendment) Act 1984', which decriminalised homosexual acts in NSW, describing it as an "outrageous and smutty epitaph" which would assist in the "collapse of civilization through the breakdown of spiritual values". George Petersen, a longtime supporter of homosexual law reform and the ALP Member for Illawarra, retorted to Punch's opposition by saying that "your case is one of blind, homophobic prejudice which takes no account of reality or humanity." On 16 October 1984, Punch was suspended from Parliament for 48 hours for unparliamentary behaviour after an unruly session in which Punch accused the speaker, Laurie Kelly, of bias towards the government.

== Later life ==
Punch held his shadow portfolio until his retirement from politics on 2 July 1985. Following his retirement he was made a NSW National Party life member. A staunch monarchist, Punch had been permitted on 13 July 1976 by Queen Elizabeth II, on the Governor's recommendation, to retain use of the title "The Honourable". Punch died in the Sydney suburb of Church Point on 28 December 1991.

New South Wales Legislative Assembly
Preceded by D'Arcy Rose	Member for Upper Hunter; 1959 – 1962	Succeeded by Frank O'Keefe
Preceded by Ray Fitzgerald	Member for Gloucester; 1962 – 1985	Succeeded by Wendy Machin
Political offices
Preceded by Davis Hughes	Minister for Public Works; 1973 – 1976	Succeeded by Jack Ferguson
New title	Minister for Ports; 1975 – 1976	Succeeded by Jack Ferguson
Preceded by Sir Charles Cutler	Deputy Premier of New South Wales; 1975 – 1976	Succeeded by Jack Ferguson
Party political offices
Preceded by Davis Hughes	Deputy Leader of the New South Wales Country Party; 1973 – 1975	Succeeded by James Bruxner
Preceded by Sir Charles Cutler	Leader of the New South Wales National Country Party; 1975 – 1985	Succeeded by Wal Murray
