= Mac Abbott =

Australian politician

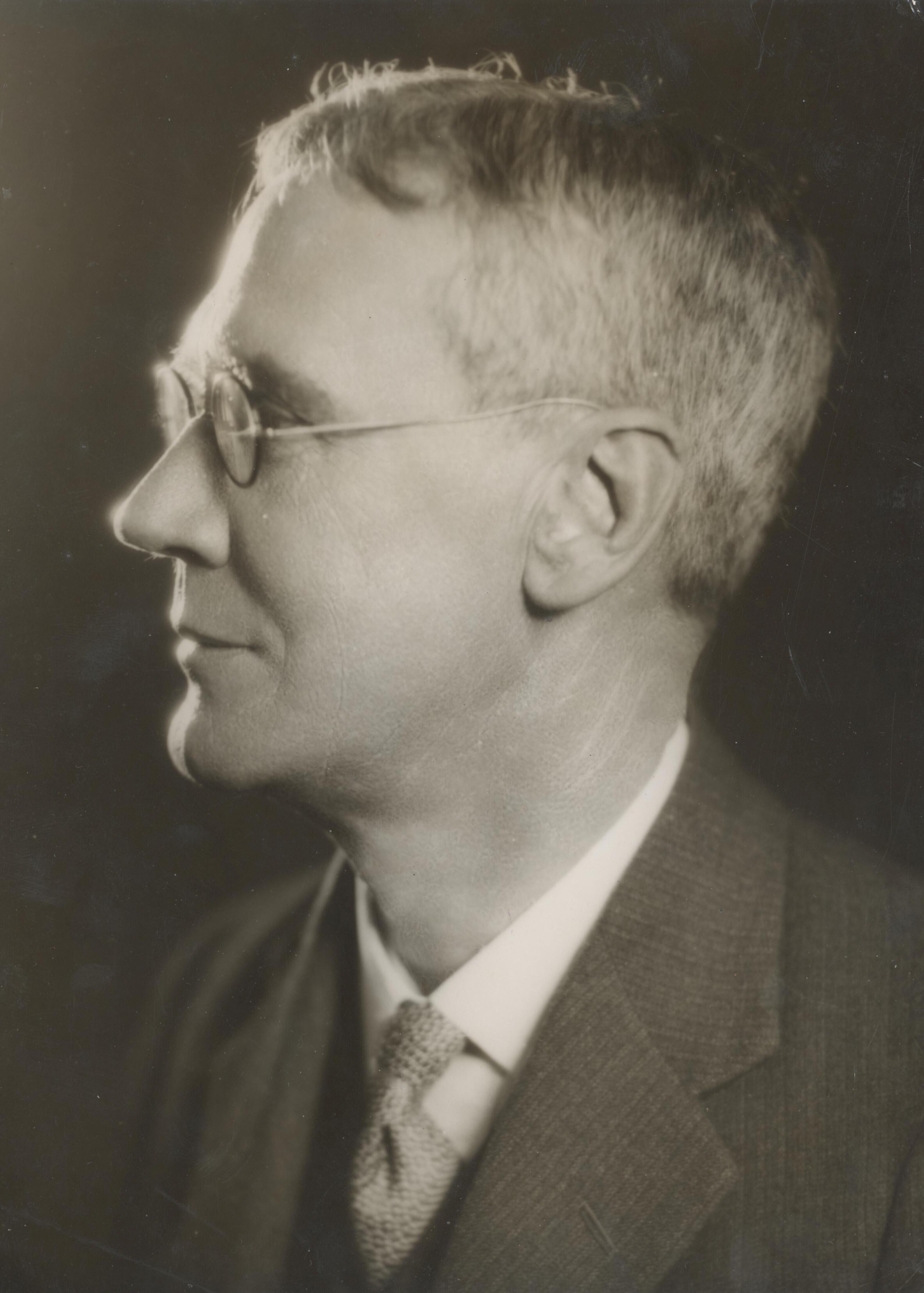

Senator for New South Wales
- In office 1 July 1935 – 30 June 1941

Member of the New South Wales Legislative Assembly
- In office 6 December 1913 – 10 May 1918
- Preceded by: Henry Willis
- Succeeded by: William Cameron
- Constituency: Upper Hunter

Personal details
- Born: 3 July 1877 Murrurundi, New South Wales, Australia
- Died: 30 December 1960 (aged 83) Scone, New South Wales, Australia
- Party: Australian Country Party
- Spouse: Elizabeth Hall (m. 1905)
- Relations: Joseph Palmer Abbott (father); John Abbott (brother); Joe Abbott (half-brother)
- Profession: Solicitor

Macartney "Mac" Abbott (3 July 1877 – 30 December 1960) was an Australian lawyer, politician and peace activist. He was a Senator for New South Wales from 1935 to 1941, representing the Country Party, and had previously served in the New South Wales Legislative Assembly from 1913 to 1918. He was a leader of the new state movement in the late 1920s and in the 1930s became known for his idiosyncratic efforts towards world peace.

== Early life ==
Abbott was born on 3 July 1877 in Murrurundi, New South Wales. He was one of three children born to Matilda Elizabeth (née Macartney) and Joseph Palmer Abbott. His father was a solicitor who was elected to the parliament of New South Wales in 1880, while his older brother John Henry Macartney Abbott was a novelist and poet.

Abbott's mother died in 1880 and his father remarried in 1883. He had four half-siblings from his father's second marriage, including Joe Abbott whom he briefly served alongside in federal parliament. Abbott spent his early years in country New South Wales and attended the state school at Wingen. He went on to attend Sydney Church of England Grammar School from 1889 to 1891 and The King's School, Parramatta, from 1892 to 1896. He was school captain in his final two years.

== Legal career and business interests ==
After leaving school, Abbott studied law as an articled clerk with his father's Sydney legal firm and later worked for his cousin John Shaw in Scone. He was admitted to practice as a solicitor in 1901 and went into partnership with Frederick Tout. Their firm of Abbott Tout was initially based in Sydney and later had offices in Parramatta and Boorowa.

Abbott had a long association with the NRMA, beginning with its formation in the early 1920s. His firm was engaged to offer free legal advice to NRMA members, including acting for members in traffic cases. He continued to represent the NRMA into the 1950s, prior to his retirement in 1957 at the age of 80. Although the partnership between Abbott and Tout was formally dissolved in 1933, the name "Abbott Tout" remained in use for their firm. It was eventually acquired by Home Wilkinson Lowry in 2006, having continued to specialise in motor vehicle insurance cases.

== State politics ==
Abbott was elected to the New South Wales Legislative Assembly at the 1913 state election, defeating the incumbent MP Henry Willis. He was endorsed by the Farmers' and Settlers' Association but joined the Liberal Reform Party in parliament. He was re-elected with an increased majority at the 1917 state election, following the creation of the new Nationalist Party.

Abbott's electorate voted "No" during the 1916 referendum on overseas service for conscripted soldiers. Although identifying as a "wholehearted conscriptionist", during his re-election campaign he publicly committed to resigning his seat if another "No" vote was returned by his electorate at the 1917 referendum on the same question. He kept his promise by resigning his seat on 10 May 1918 and did not recontest the resulting by-election.

Abbott resumed his political involvement in the 1920s as a supporter of the new state movement, seeking the creation of several new states in country New South Wales. In 1921 he helped create the Sydney-based New States of Australia League, becoming president of the league in 1922.

== Federal politics ==
Abbott was an unsuccessful preselection candidate for the Nationalist Party prior to the 1928 federal election. His association with new statism led him to involvement with the Country Party and he campaigned for the party in several elections. In 1931, he also joined the All for Australia League (AFA), while retaining his membership of the Country Party. He was an unsuccessful candidate for the seat of Martin at the 1931 federal election, losing to former New South Wales premier William Holman. He and Holman were both endorsed candidates of the newly created United Australia Party (UAP), representing competing strands within the UAP.

At the 1934 election, Abbott was elected to a six-year Senate term commencing on 1 July 1935. He stood as the Country Party's nominee on the joint ticket with the UAP. He lost his seat after a single term at the 1940 election, with his tenure concluding on 30 June 1941.

According to Country Party historian Ulrich Ellis, Abbott was the only lawyer in the parliamentary Country Party. He served on several parliamentary committees including the joint select committee into federal bankruptcy law from 1935 to 1936. He spoke on a wide range of subjects including "tobacco, tariffs, wool, the trawling industry, the greater use of shale oil deposits, land titles, citizenship and insect pests".

=== Peace activism ===
During the late 1930s, Abbott becoming a leading parliamentary advocate for international peace, which he believed could be obtained through a world government and world language. In November 1935, he moved a Senate motion calling for the Australian government to support the creation of an International Thought Exchange at the next League of Nations Assembly. At the request of government Senate leader George Pearce he amended the motion to instead present an address to King Edward VIII, which was passed by the Senate in September 1936. His proposal envisaged "a scheme to further world peace through the compulsory teaching in schools of an international language".

In 1936, Abbott established a peace organisation called the Fellowship of International Understanding, securing both Prime Minister Joseph Lyons and former ALP leader Jim Scullin as members. He believed that a new world government should be created "to which all arms would be surrendered and which would promote peace and good order". In 1943, after leaving parliament, Abbott lobbied ALP prime minister John Curtin and external affairs minister H. V. Evatt for greater international co-operation in the post-war period. He praised Evatt for his work and promised to support his re-election at the next election.

== Personal life ==
Abbott married Elizabeth Hall in 1905, with whom he had two sons. In 1927 he acquired a farming property, Tooloogan Vale, near Scone, New South Wales. He died in Scone on 30 December 1960, aged 83.

New South Wales Legislative Assembly
Preceded by Henry Willis	Member for Upper Hunter; 1913–1918	Succeeded by William Cameron
