= Thomas Hungerford (Australian politician) =

Australian politician (1823–1904)

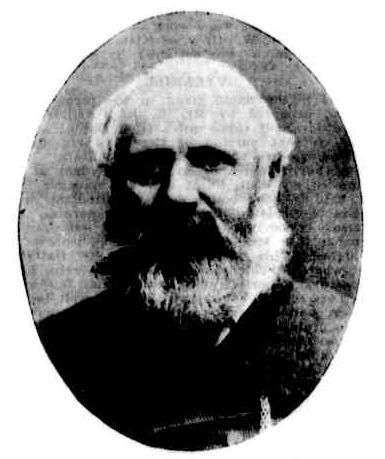
Thomas Hungerford

Thomas Hungerford (6 September 1823 – 4 May 1904) was a pioneer pastoralist and politician in Australia. He was a Member of the New South Wales Legislative Assembly.

== Early life ==
Hungerford was born near Cork to Captain Emanuel Hungerford and Catherine Loan(e). The family migrated to New South Wales in 1828, and his father settled on the Hunter River. Hungerford became a pastoralist, owning property near Walgett and inheriting his father's Hunter property in 1852. On 19 June 1852 he married Emma Hollingsworth Wood, with whom he had nine children; a second marriage to Catherine Mary Mallon produced six children.

== Politics ==
He first stood as a candidate for the New South Wales Legislative Assembly for Upper Hunter at the election for The Upper Hunter, but was unsuccessful, finishing second behind Francis White with a margin of 342 votes (26.6%). White died 6 months later and Hungerford won the resulting by-election, however the by-election was overturned by the Election and Qualifications Committee on the basis that two polls were taken at Belltrees. A second by-election was held in August 1875, however Hungerford was defeated. He was elected to Northumberland at the 1877 election, but he resigned in 1880. He was re-elected at the 1882 by-election, but decided to contest The Upper Hunter at the 1882 election, but finished last on the poll. He was elected again for Upper Hunter at the 1885 election, but he was defeated for a final time in 1887, although he continued to contest elections until 1894.

== Later life ==
Hungerford was ruined by the 1890s depression, and by 1900 had lost all his property. He died at Ashfield in 1904.

== Legacy ==
The town of Hungerford, Queensland was named after him.

New South Wales Legislative Assembly
Preceded by Francis White	Member for Upper Hunter; 1875	Succeeded by John McElhone
Preceded by William Turner	Member for Northumberland; 1877–1880	Succeeded by Ninian Melville
Preceded by William Turner	Member for Northumberland; 1882; Served alongside: Ninian Melville	Succeeded by Atkinson Tighe
Preceded by John McElhone; John McLaughlin	Member for Upper Hunter; 1885–1887; Served alongside: Robert Fitzgerald	Succeeded by John McElhone
