= William Abbott (Australian politician) =

Australian politician

Member of the NSW Legislative Assembly
- In office 4 February 1889 – 6 June 1891

Personal details
- Born: 1 April 1844 Muswellbrook, New South Wales
- Died: 13 November 1924 (aged 80) Wingen, New South Wales
- Party: Protectionist
- Parent(s): John Kingsmill Abbott; Frances Amanda Brady

William Edward Abbott (1 April 1844 – 14 November 1924), commonly referred to as W. E. Abbott, was an Australian politician. He was a member of the New South Wales Legislative Assembly for Upper Hunter as a Protectionist in 1890 and served as president of the Council of the Pastoralists' Union and the Pastoralists' Federal Council of Australia.

== Biography ==
He was born at Muswellbrook to squatter John Kingsmill Abbott and Frances Amanda Brady. He attended The King's School in Parramatta and Sydney Grammar School, but left at the age of sixteen to run the family farm at Wingen. He eventually owned one of the most valuable estates in the area, totaling 30,000 acres (12,000 ha). In 1889 he was elected to the New South Wales Legislative Assembly for Upper Hunter as a Protectionist, but was defeated in 1891. From 1890 he was a member of the Council of the Pastoralists' Union of New South Wales, serving as president from 1894 to 1897 and from 1900 to 1910. He was also President of the Pastoralists' Federal Council of Australia in 1891. He published a series of books, including an early work on the effect of rabbits in Australia. Abbott died on his property from a self-administered dose of arsenic in 1924.

New South Wales Legislative Assembly
Preceded by John McElhone	Member for Upper Hunter; 1889–1891; Served alongside: Robert Fitzgerald	Succeeded by Thomas Williams
