= Benjamin Singleton (Australian settler) =

Australian settler (1788–1853)

Benjamin Singleton (1788–1853) was a free settler, miller, and explorer of Australia in the early period of British colonisation. He was born in England on 7 August 1788 and arrived in the Colony of New South Wales on 14 February 1792 in the Pitt, a convict ship. His father, William, had been sentenced to transportation for seven years, and had brought his wife and two sons with him. An older son, James, arrived as a free settler in 1808.

== Career as a miller ==
James and Benjamin built and operated several steam-powered and water-driven flour mills in the following years. They had mills at various times both in the Hunter Valley, near Singleton, and on the Hawkesbury River.

One of the mills was a tidal mill on the right bank of Hawkesbury River estuary, situated about halfway between Wisemans Ferry and Peats Ferry. It was near the confluence with tidal Laybury's Creek, which was impounded to provide the necessary tidal flows of water to power the undershot water wheel. It was used to mill wheat and maize, until the great flood of 1867, which caused extensive damage and it was derelict by the 1880s. The ruin survived in substantially complete form into the early 20th Century. Only some foundation stones remain now. The mill has given its name to the suburb, Singletons Mill, New South Wales, which includes its former site.

== Exploration ==
In October 1817, Benjamin Singleton set out with a party of men including William Parr and Aboriginal guides to find a route, suitable for wagons, to the Hunter River. They almost reached the Hunter Valley before turning back. In April 1818 he led a private expedition to the Hunter which was also unsuccessful.

When, in 1819, John Howe managed to reach the Hunter, he followed in part the route discovered by Singleton and Parr. He had discovered some fine grazing land, but Howe was dissatisfied with the route.

In February, 1820, John Howe left Windsor with a party of fifteen, including Benjamin Singleton and two Aboriginal guides. By following the advice of the guides they were able to find a route which became known as the Bulga Road. On 15 March they reached the Hunter, and followed its course upstream as far as Maitland. For his part in this expedition Singleton was granted 200 acres (81 ha), part of which became the site of the town of Singleton.

== Later occupations ==
Singleton used his land for grazing cattle while pursuing other activities. He was appointed to be a district constable, and continued his mill building business. He also built a horse-drawn boat, which was not a commercial success.

== Death ==
He died on 2 May 1853, leaving a wife and ten children, and was buried in the Whittingham cemetery, near Singleton.

== Singleton Council ==
The Singleton Council publishes a brochure about Benjamin Singleton, and displays a copy on its website. It contains the story of his life and includes a photograph of the plaque on his grave. The plaque describes him as "Pioneer of the Hunter District and Founder of the Town of Singleton". It recounts that, in 1837, he donated land for a market square, which is now known as Burdekin Park. It also mentions him as making the first gifts of land to the Anglican and Presbyterian churches in the town.
