= D'Arcy Rose =

Australian politician

Personal details
- Born: 14 August 1888 Ashfield, New South Wales
- Died: 17 August 1964 (aged 76) Wahroonga, New South Wales
- Party: Country Party

D'Arcy Rose (14 August 1888 – 17 August 1964) was an Australian politician and a member of the New South Wales Legislative Assembly from 1939 until 1959. He was a member of the Country Party.

== Life ==
Rose was born in Ashfield, New South Wales. He was the son of a company director and as a young man he established seed and produce and real estate businesses on the Central Coast of New South Wales. He later owned a dairy farm in the Upper Hunter Valley. Rose was elected to the New South Wales Parliament as the Country Party member for the seat of Upper Hunter at the 1939 by-election caused by the death of the sitting Country Party member Malcolm Brown. He retained the seat at the next 6 elections and retired at the 1959 election. He did not hold party, parliamentary or ministerial office.

New South Wales Legislative Assembly
Preceded by Malcolm Brown	Member for Upper Hunter; 1939 – 1959	Succeeded by Leon Punch
