= Col Fisher =

Australian politician

Colin Murray "Col" Fisher, OAM (23 January 1923 – 7 July 2003) was an Australian politician. He was the National Party member for Upper Hunter in the New South Wales Legislative Assembly from 1970 to 1988, and held ministerial positions from 1975 to 1976.

Fisher was born in Leura, the son of dairy farmer Leslie Fisher and his wife Florence Lipscomb. He was educated at Seaham Public School, Sydney Church of England Grammar School and Hawkesbury Agricultural College before running a beef and dairy farm at Jerrys Plains. In 1942 he enlisted in the AIF and served in New Guinea, Borneo and Celebes, rising to the rank of captain. He left the armed forces in 1946. On 6 January 1949, Fisher married Adrienne Goldring, with whom he had two children.

In 1956, Fisher was elected to Patrick's Plains Shire Council. He served on the council until 1970, when the Country Party member for the state seat of Upper Hunter, Frank O'Keefe, resigned to contest the Australian House of Representatives seat of Paterson. Fisher was selected as the Country candidate for the by-election, and narrowly defeated Labor candidate Roger Nott in a three-cornered contest. In 1975, he was appointed Minister for Local Government; he was transferred to Lands and Forests early in 1976. He lost his position when Labor won power at the 1976 state election. Fisher continued in the shadow ministry until 1986, and retired from politics in 1988.

Fisher died in Singleton in 2003.

New South Wales Legislative Assembly
Preceded by Frank O'Keefe	Member for Upper Hunter; 1970–1988	Succeeded by George Souris
