= Jerrys Plains, New South Wales =

Jerrys Plains
- Town
- Coordinates: 32°30′S 150°55′E
- Country: Australia
- State: New South Wales
- LGAs: Muswellbrook Shire; Singleton Council

Government
  - State electorate: Upper Hunter
  - Federal division: Hunter

Population
  - Total: 447 (SAL 2021)
- Postcode: 2330

Jerrys Plains is a village in the Hunter Valley in New South Wales, Australia about 33 kilometres west of Singleton on the Golden Highway.

The surrounding countryside is home to some substantial horse-breeding properties, notably the Australian branch of Ireland's giant Coolmore Stud, as well as viticulture and coal mining.

== History ==
Jerrys Plains is on the land of the Wonnarua and Darkinjung peoples, with some sources also mentioning Gamilaraay territory extending to this area. The area is considered the intersection of these Indigenous peoples.

The first Europeans to the area came in an expedition led by mineralogist William Parr, who made it as far as the hills above Doyles Creek in 1817. In 1819, John Howe followed roughly the same route then traced what is now known as Doyles Creek to its junction with the Hunter River. Howe's Aboriginal guide, Myles, told him that this was 'Coomery Roy', the land of the Kamilaroi peoples who apparently called it 'Pullmyheri' or 'Pullumunbra'.

Pastoral squatters soon moved to the area, operating sheep stations. Edmund Doyle took up property at "Jerry's Plains" in the 1830s. He established "Montrose Park" pastoral holdings there.

Jerrys Plains Public School opened in January 1881. It had an enrolment of 40 students in 2018.

Jerrys Plains Post Office opened in 1837; it has now closed, though the closure date is unknown. The former post office building later served as a visitor information centre.

St James Anglican Church, designed by John Horbury Hunt, dates from the 1870s. It has monthly services, held on the second Sunday of each month.

The town has a hotel, the Jerrys Plains Tavern, located on Golden Highway. A long-running earlier hotel, the Post Office Hotel, burnt down in December 1947 and was not rebuilt. It initially carried on in temporary premises, but was delicensed in 1953.

=== Etymology ===
Jerrys Plains is believed to be named after a member of John Howe's party, Jeremiah Butler, Jerry, an ex-convict and servant, who was injured while lighting a camp fire in damp weather using gunpowder. Another theory postulates that Jerry developed gangrene after his gun exploded and blew off his thumb.

== Population ==
In the 2016 Census, there were 385 people in Jerrys Plains. 68.8% of people were born in Australia and 86.5% of people spoke only English at home. The most common responses for religion were Anglican 30.1% and Catholic 27.4%.
