= John McLaughlin (Australian politician) =

Australian politician

John McLaughlin (5 June 1850 – 5 February 1918) was an Irish-born Australian politician.

He was born in Westmeath to Daniel and Anne McLaughlin. The family migrated to New South Wales around 1852 and settled in the Hunter region. McLaughlin attended school at Maitland and then went to Lyndhurst College in Sydney. He became a solicitor's clerk in October 1874 and was admitted as a solicitor two months later. In 1882 he married Ada Moore, with whom he had four children. In 1880 he was elected to the New South Wales Legislative Assembly as the member for Upper Hunter. He was defeated in 1885, but continued contesting elections for the next decade, becoming associated first with the Free Trade Party and then with the Protectionists. In 1895 he was elected the independent protectionist member for Raleigh. He retired in 1901, although he did later contest Raleigh once more in 1907 as an independent Liberal. McLaughlin died at Waverley in 1918.

New South Wales Legislative Assembly
| Preceded by John McElhone | Member for Upper Hunter; 1880–1885; Served alongside: John McElhone | Succeeded by Robert Fitzgerald; Thomas Hungerford |
| Preceded by Patrick Hogan | Member for Raleigh; 1895–1901 | Succeeded by George Briner |
