= Fitzgerald Bridge, Aberdeen =

Fitzgerald Bridge
- Coordinates: 32.1568°S 150.8852°E
- Carries: New England Highway
- Crosses: Hunter River
- Begins: Aberdeen, New South Wales
- Owner: Transport for NSW

History
- Opened: 26 July 1893 (1st); December 1986 (2nd); June 2014 (third)

The Fitzgerald Bridge is a bridge that carries the New England Highway over the Hunter River to the north of Aberdeen, New South Wales, Australia.

== History ==
The original metal lattice truss Fitzgerald Bridge was opened on 26 July 1893. In 1937 the wooden deck was replaced with concrete. In December 1986 the bridge was duplicated with a nearly identical second warren truss bridge built by Britton & Kell to carry northbound traffic with the original converted to carry southbound traffic. In June 2014 both were replaced by a single structure to allow heavier trucks to operate. The 1893 bridge was retained as a pedestrian and cycle bridge while the 1986 bridge was demolished. It was named after Robert Fitzgerald.
