= Alister McMullin =

Australian politician

The Honourable Sir Alister McMullin KCMG
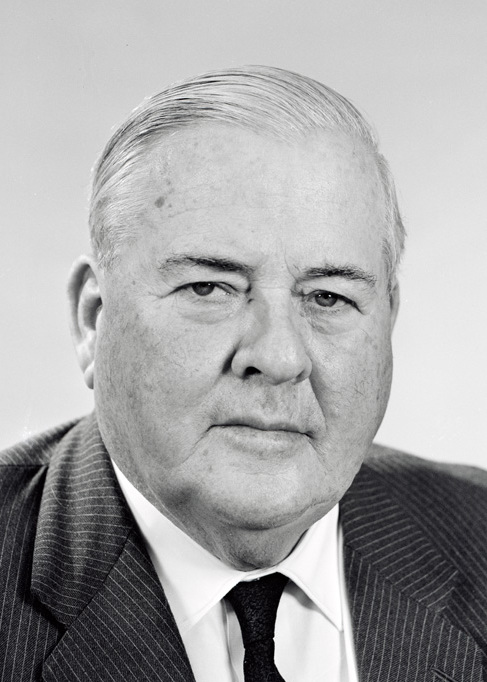

President of the Senate
- In office 8 September 1953 – 30 June 1971
- Preceded by: Ted Mattner
- Succeeded by: Magnus Cormack

Senator for New South Wales
- In office 28 April 1951 – 30 June 1971

Personal details
- Born: 14 July 1900 Rouchel, New South Wales, Australia
- Died: 7 August 1984 (aged 84) Scone, New South Wales, Australia
- Party: Liberal
- Spouse: Thelma Smith (m. 1946)
- Occupation: Farmer

Sir Alister Maxwell McMullin, KCMG (14 July 1900 – 7 August 1984) was an Australian politician who served as a Senator for New South Wales from 1951 to 1971, representing the Liberal Party. He was President of the Senate for a record term of almost 18 years, from 1953 to 1971.

== Early life ==
McMullin was the youngest of seven children born to Catherine (née McDonald) and William George McMullin. He was born on his father's grazing property Bingeberry in Rouchel, New South Wales, near the town of Aberdeen. He was educated at Rouchel Public School. After his father's death in 1928, McMullin bought Yarramoor, a property where he raised prime lambs. He served on the Upper Hunter Shire Council.

McMullin enlisted in the Australian Army in July 1940, transferring to the Royal Australian Air Force in January 1941. He finished the war with the rank of flight lieutenant and briefly commanded No. 42 Squadron RAAF. He was demobilised on 22 February 1946 and married Thelma Louise Smith on 23 November.

== Politics ==
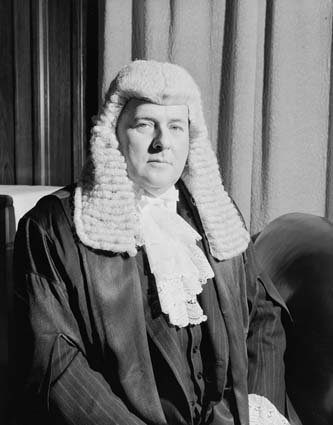
McMullin in 1953

McMullin twice attempted to enter the New South Wales Legislative Assembly, standing as a Nationalist candidate at the 1931 Upper Hunter by-election and as one of three Country candidates at the 1941 Liverpool Plains election, but was unsuccessful.

In 1951, he was elected to the Australian Senate as a Liberal Senator for New South Wales. In 1953, he succeeded Ted Mattner as President of the Senate; he served as President for 18 years, until his retirement from the Senate in 1971. He is thus the longest serving President of the Senate in Australian history.

He was closely associated with the planning and development of the National Library of Australia as Chairman of the Australian Advisory Council on Bibliographical Services, Chairman of the Commonwealth Parliamentary Library Committee and Deputy Chairman of the Council of the National Library of Australia.

He was also involved in the preparation of plans for the new Parliament House in Canberra as Chairman of a special Parliamentary Joint Select Committee. He represented the Australian Government at numerous international events, including the funeral of John F. Kennedy.

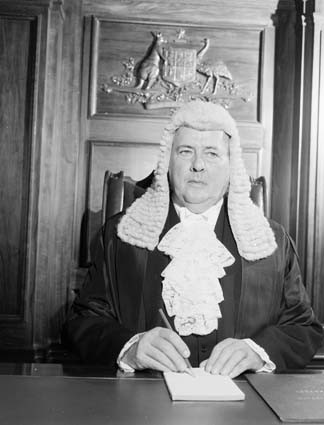
McMullin in 1967

Whilst serving as President of the Senate, McMullin was appointed a Knight Commander of the Order of St Michael and St George in 1957.

== Other activities ==
Outside politics McMullin was Chancellor of the University of Newcastle from 1966 until 1977.

He died at the Scone District Nursing Home in 1984.

Parliament of Australia
Preceded by Ted Mattner	President of the Senate; 1953 – 1971	Succeeded by Magnus Cormack
