= John Creed (politician) =

Australian politician (1842 – 1930)

John Mildred Creed
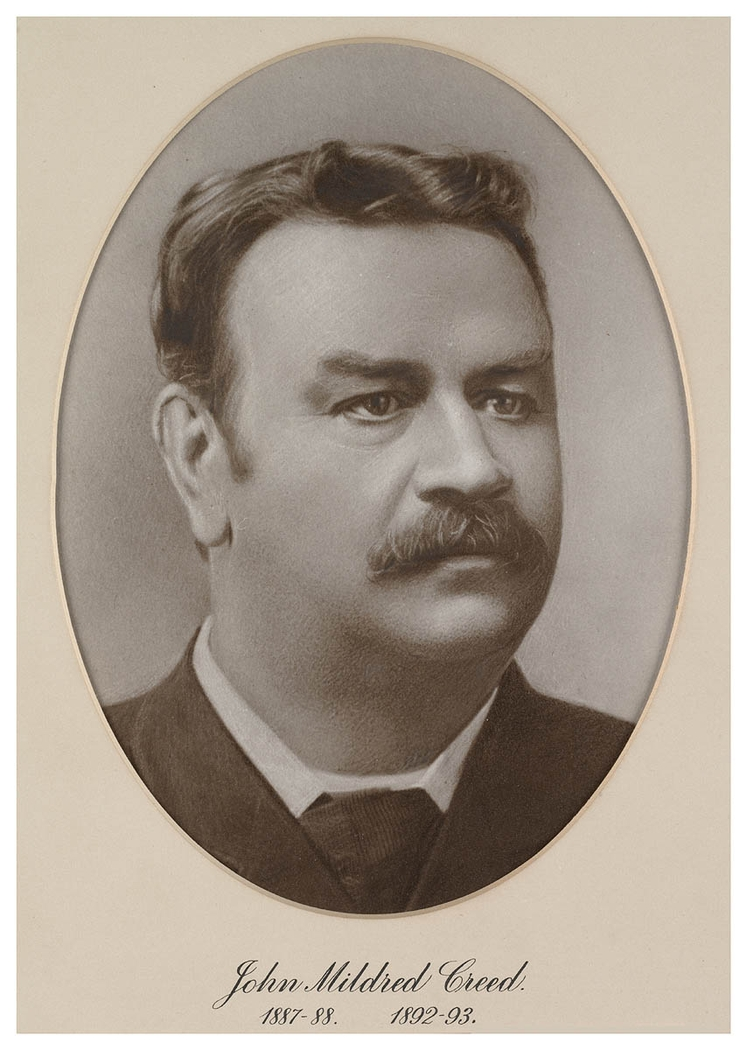
- Born: 21 November 1842; Ashbrook, Gloucester, England
- Died: 30 October 1930 (aged 87); North Sydney, NSW, Australia
- Occupations: Physician, Politician

John Mildred Creed (21 November 1842 – 30 October 1930), commonly referred to as J. Mildred Creed, was an English-born Australian doctor and politician.

== Early life ==
Creed was born at Ashbrook (Ampney St Mary), near Cirencester, Gloucestershire, England and educated at Cowley, Gloucestershire and Kingsdown College, Bristol. He migrated with his family to Melbourne in 1861 but returned to England to study medicine. He qualified M.R.C.S. from University College, London and L.R.C.P. from University of Edinburgh in 1866.

== Career ==
Creed returned to Australia and was appointed resident physician at the Sydney Infirmary. In 1867 he was appointed medical officer on the Cadell expedition to the Northern Territory. In April 1868 Creed was registered by the New South Wales Medical Board, and he established a practice at Scone and served as a magistrate. Creed represented Upper Hunter in the New South Wales Legislative Assembly from 1872 to 1874.

In 1882 Creed set up practice in the Sydney suburb of Woollahra. He was secretary of the New South Wales branch of the British Medical Association from 1883 to 1886 and its president in 1887 and 1892. In 1885 he was appointed for life to the Legislative Council. He had a significant role in passing legislation to license medical practitioners, to protect children, to validate marriage and to deal with inebriates. He was a strong opponent of the White Australia Policy.

== Later life ==
In 1916 Creed had his book My Recollections of Australia and Elsewhere 1842–1914 published in London. He also wrote a number of booklets, mostly in the twentieth century. His papers from the years 1882–1911 are held by the State Library of New South Wales.

== Family ==
Creed married Clara Sophia Farmer (died 19 April 1896) on 30 April 1868. He married again, to the widow Agnes Williams on 12 May 1905.

He died in North Sydney.

== Works ==
- Fear as a factor in producing many of the alarming symptoms following the bite of Australian snakes (1885)
- A colonist's views on army reform (1902)
- The control of liquor traffic (1902)
- The settlement by "whites" of tropical Australia (1912)
- The German peril : neglected forecasts (1914–1918)
- "Words not deeds" of the Right Honourable Sir George Houston Reid : re-issued in view of his candidature for the British House of Commons in 1916 (1916)
- Diabetes : a paper setting forth certain facts relative to the new insulin treatment for diabetes and its original use in Australia by a Sydney medical practitioner ... (1923?)

New South Wales Legislative Assembly
Preceded by Archibald Bell	Member for Upper Hunter; 1872 – 1874	Succeeded by Francis White
