= Malcolm Brown (politician) =

Australian politician (1881–1939)

Malcolm Brown (1 January 1881 – 29 August 1939) was an Australian politician. He was a Country Party member of the New South Wales Legislative Assembly from 1931 to 1939, representing the electorate of Upper Hunter.

Brown was born at Jerrys Plains, New South Wales, and educated at Jerrys Plains Public School. He worked as a farm and station hand after leaving school, and later in life was a mail contractor in the Western districts and a storekeeper and farmer at Jerrys Plains. He served as a councillor of the Patricks Plains Shire from 1926 until 1931, and was shire president in 1931, the year he was elected to parliament.

The local MLA, Nationalist William Cameron, died in 1931, and Brown nominated to contest the by-election as an Independent Country candidate. He was supported by the local branches of the Country Party, but was not officially endorsed as the seat was allocated to the Nationalists under the Country Party's coalition agreement. He won the seat on preferences, and joined the Country Party caucus upon his election. He was easily re-elected in 1932 and 1935, and was unopposed in 1938.

Brown died in office of a long illness in 29 August 1939 (aged 58), and was buried at the cemetery in Jerrys Plains. His later life had been marked by personal tragedy; his only son had been killed in an accident, and his only daughter had died of an illness.

New South Wales Legislative Assembly
Preceded by William Cameron	Member for Upper Hunter; 1931–1939	Succeeded by D'Arcy Rose
