= Frank O'Keefe =

Australian politician

Frank O'Keefe AM
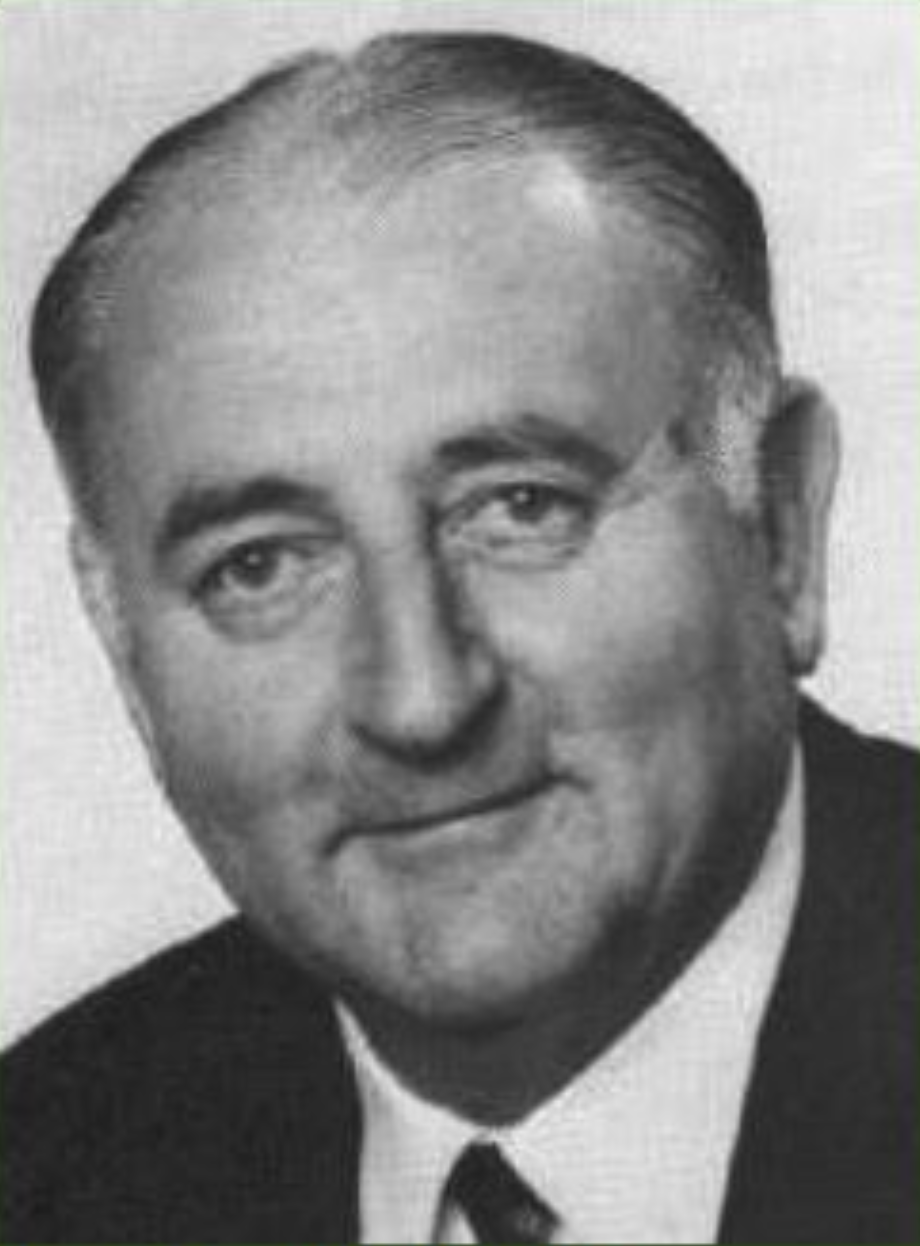

Member of the Australian Parliament for Paterson
- In office 25 October 1969 – 26 October 1984
- Preceded by: Allen Fairhall
- Succeeded by: Division abolished

Personal details
- Born: Frank Lionel O'Keefe; 6 October 1912 Gunnedah, New South Wales
- Died: 21 April 1989 (aged 76)
- Party: Country Party
- Occupation: Farm machinery and oil merchant

Frank Lionel O'Keefe, AM (6 October 1912 – 21 April 1989) was an Australian politician. Born in Gunnedah, New South Wales, he attended state schools before becoming a farm machinery distributor and oil merchant. He was mayor of Gunnedah Shire Council for 18 years, and also served on Namoi Valley County Council. In 1961 he was elected to the New South Wales Legislative Assembly for Liverpool Plains, representing the Country Party; he transferred to Upper Hunter in 1962, which he held until 1969. In that year he was elected to the Australian House of Representatives as the member for Paterson. He held the seat until its abolition in 1984, at which time he retired. O'Keefe died in 1989.

New South Wales Legislative Assembly
Preceded by Roger Nott	Member for Liverpool Plains; 1961–1962	Succeeded by Abolished
Preceded by Leon Punch	Member for Upper Hunter; 1962–1969	Succeeded by Col Fisher
Parliament of Australia
Preceded by Allen Fairhall	Member for Paterson; 1969–1984	Succeeded by seat abolished
