= John McElhone =

Australian politician (1833–1898)

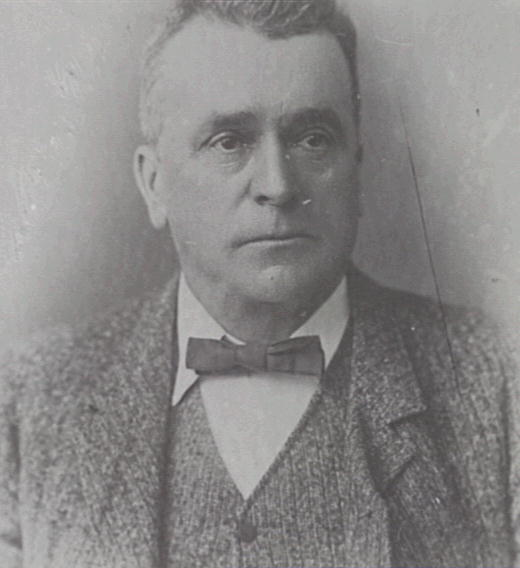
Alderman John McElhone

John McElhone (16 June 1833 – 6 May 1898) was an Australian politician.

He was born in Sydney to milk vendor Terence McElhone and Catherine Mallon. He attended St Mary's Seminary School and was an apprentice seaman from 1851. In 1859 he was a commercial agent, and from 1867 to 1872 he was a merchant dealing with hide and tallow. On 5 February 1862 he married Mary Jane Browne, with whom he had nine children. Two of his sons, William Percy (1871–1932) and Arthur Joseph (1868–1946), each served as Lord Mayor of Sydney.

A Sydney City alderman from 1878 to 1882, he was elected to the New South Wales Legislative Assembly in 1875 as the member for Upper Hunter. In 1882 he was concurrently elected for both Upper Hunter and East Sydney, resigning from East Sydney shortly after. In 1883 he challenged Adolphus Taylor to resign his seat and both would contest Taylor's seat of Mudgee. McElhone was defeated by Taylor in the Mudgee by-election, however he was re-elected at the Upper Hunter by-election held on the same day, with the Newcastle Morning Herald and Miners' Advocate reporting that McElhone had been nominated without his authority. He lost Upper Hunter in 1885, but returned in 1887, retiring in 1889.

Associated with the Free Trade Party, he ran unsuccessfully in 1891, and 1894, before winning election to the seat of Sydney-Fitzroy in 1895.

He died at Potts Point in 1898.

New South Wales Legislative Assembly
Preceded by Thomas Hungerford	Member for Upper Hunter; 1875–1885; Served alongside: None/John McLaughlin	Succeeded by Robert Fitzgerald; Thomas Hungerford
Preceded by Henry Dangar; Henry Parkes; Arthur Renwick	Member for East Sydney; 1882–1883; Served alongside: Edmund Barton, George Griffiths, George Reid	Succeeded by Henry Copeland
Preceded by Thomas Hungerford	Member for Upper Hunter; 1887–1889; Served alongside: Robert Fitzgerald	Succeeded by William Abbott
Preceded by Henry Chapman	Member for Sydney-Fitzroy; 1895–1898	Succeeded by John Norton
