= John Howe (Australian settler) =

John Howe (1774–1852) was a free settler and explorer of Australia in the early period of British colonisation. He became a successful building contractor, and also served as a chief constable and coroner. It is believed that he was born at Redbourn, Hertfordshire, England, the son of John How and his spouse Mary Roberts.

== Early life ==
Howe was educated to a reasonable level for the time, such that he had some plans to become a teacher when he was able to emigrate to the colony of New South Wales. Meanwhile, he worked for a grocer in London.

== Emigration ==
The Coromandel was a convict ship that carried, on her first voyage to Sydney, a small number of free settlers who had been given free passage and the promise of 100 acres (40 ha) of land.

Howe arrived in Sydney on the Coromandel in June 1802, along with his spouse Frances Ward, and daughter Mary. Upon his arrival, he received a grant of 100 acres (40 ha) at Mulgrave Place (now Mulgrave) on the Hawkesbury River. Frances died three months later and was buried at Parramatta.

== Auctioneer and building contractor ==
Andrew Thompson arrived in Sydney as a convict on the Pitt in February, 1792, and became the richest man in the colony before his death in 1810.

In 1811, Howe was appointed as licensed auctioneer at Windsor, a position previously held by Andrew Thompson. His successful completion of the disposal of Thompson's property earned the gratitude of Governor Lachlan Macquarie. In 1813, he formed a partnership with James McGrath. Together they entered into a contract to complete and upgrade the road from Sydney to Windsor. He also agreed to build a toll-bridge over South Creek at Windsor. For some years, this was known as Howe's Bridge. In 1815, the partners enlarged the wharf at Windsor; in 1816, they began another wharf for the government.

== Government appointments ==
In addition to his work as an auctioneer, Howe served as chief constable at Windsor from 1814 to 1821. From then until 1828 he served as coroner.

== Finding a route to the Hunter ==
=== Prior attempts ===
==== William Parr ====
William Parr was a convict who arrived on the Fortune on 11 June 1813. In 1817 he gained exploration experience when he accompanied John Oxley on an expedition to the west of Sydney, on which he was employed as a draftsman. In October 1817, he set out with a party of men including Benjamin Singleton and Aboriginal guides to find a route, suitable for wagons, to the Hunter River. They almost reached the Hunter Valley before turning back.

==== Benjamin Singleton ====
Benjamin Singleton (1788–1853) was a free settler, miller, and explorer of Australia in the early period of British colonisation. He was born in England on 7 August 1788 and arrived in the colony on 14 February 1792 in the Pitt, a convict ship. His father, William, had been sentenced to transportation for seven years, and had brought his wife and two sons with him. An older son, James, arrived as a free settler in 1808.

Using information gained on his 1817 expedition with William Parr, Singleton led a private expedition to the Hunter in April 1818 but this was also unsuccessful.

=== Howe's expeditions ===
On 24 October 1819, encouraged by Governor Macquarie, Howe left Windsor with a party of seven, including two Aboriginals, hoping to discover a trafficable route from the Hawkesbury to the Hunter River. He followed in part the route discovered by Parr and Singleton. The party managed to reach the Hunter near Doyles Creek on 5 November 1819. They had discovered some fine grazing land, but Howe was dissatisfied with the route.

In February, 1820, he left Windsor with a party of fifteen, including Benjamin Singleton and two Aboriginal guides. By following the advice of the guides he was able to find a route which became known as the Bulga Road. On 15 March he reached the Hunter, where he followed its course as far as Maitland. On his return, Governor Macquarie rewarded him with a grazing licence for land at Paticks Plains (near Singleton). He was also granted 700 acres (283 ha) near the present site of Singleton. He named this property Redbourneberry. An additional 500 acres (202 ha) grant was made in 1824.

For his part in this expedition Singleton was granted 200 acres (81 ha), part of which became the site of the town of Singleton.

== Second family and later life ==
James Raworth Kennedy

On 13 May 1811 Howe again married, at St John's, Parramatta, to Jane, a daughter of James Raworth Kennedy. Jane had arrived in Sydney, as a free settler on Sovereign in 1795, with her father, her aunt and her two sisters. Howe and his second wife, Jane, had nine children. In 1839, he retired to Raworth, a small farm near Morpeth, New South Wales, where he stayed until his death.

== Death and legacy ==
Howe died on 19 December 1852, and was buried in St James's churchyard, Morpeth. His wife Jane died on 1 January 1859, aged 75. Seven of their nine children remained alive on that date.

The names of John Howe and his first wife, Frances Ward, are shown on a commemorative stone in the Presbyterian Church at Ebenezer. They are described as two of its founding members.

Howes Park in Singleton, formerly a part of the Redbourneberry estate, was named in his honour. The features Howes Swamp and Howes Mountain, and the locality Howes Valley, all along the Bulga Road, are reminders of his exploration of the area.

== Other possible associations ==
The locality of Redbournberry, near Singleton, is probably part of the Redbourneberry estate.

The locality of Raworth, near Morpeth, is probably all or part of Raworth farm.

== See also ==
- Putty Road, which closely follows the original Bulga Road.
