= William Fleming (Australian politician) =

Australian politician (1874–1961)

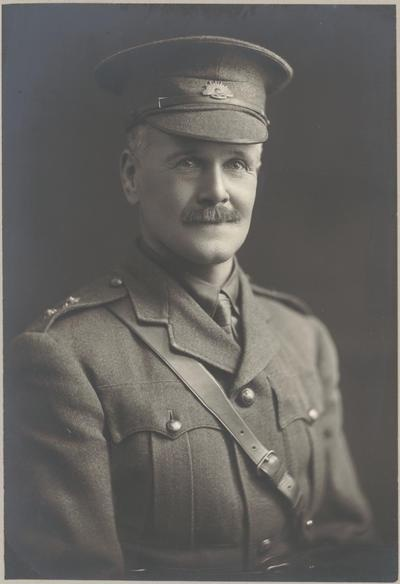

Deputy Leader of the Country Party
- In office 27 June 1922 – 16 January 1923
- Leader: Earle Page
- Preceded by: vacant
- Succeeded by: William Gibson

Member of the Australian Parliament for Robertson
- In office 31 May 1913 – 16 December 1922
- Preceded by: William Johnson
- Succeeded by: Sydney Gardner

Personal details
- Born: 19 May 1874 Donald, Victoria
- Died: 24 July 1961 (aged 87) Terrigal, New South Wales
- Party: Liberal (1901–17); Nationalist (1917–20); Country (1921–22)
- Spouse: Caroline Benn
- Occupation: Farmer

William Montgomerie Fleming (19 May 1874 – 24 July 1961) was an Australian politician, who served in the Australian House of Representatives and the New South Wales Legislative Assembly.

== Early life ==
Born in Avon Plains, Victoria to Scottish migrant and station manager John Fleming and his wife Helen (née Hastie), Fleming moved with his family to a farm near Walgett, New South Wales in 1882. Educated on the farm, private schools (including Cooerwull Academy) and at the University of Sydney, Fleming worked on the family farm while also employed as a journalist for various local newspapers. A Presbyterian, Fleming married Caroline Benn in 1900; together they had one daughter and two sons.

== Parliamentary career ==
Elected as an independent member for the electoral district of Robertson as a 27-year-old in 1901, Fleming transferred to the seat of Upper Hunter upon the abolition of Robertson in 1904.

Fleming moved to Federal parliament in 1913 as the member for the Division of Robertson, initially as a representative of the Commonwealth Liberal Party, then the Nationalist Party and later the Country Party.

While a member of Federal parliament, Fleming joined the Australian Imperial Force on 6 October 1916 and served as a Driver in the Army Service Corps until his discharge in England on 27 December 1918. He returned to parliament and served until his retirement from politics in 1922. Fleming became an orchardist in Terrigal, New South Wales, where he died in 1961. He was the last surviving MP who served when Joseph Cook was Prime Minister, as well as the last who served during Andrew Fisher's third tenure as PM.

In addition to his parliamentary career, William Fleming wrote poetry, novels and books for children through his lifetime. His earliest poems appeared in The Queenslander and The Bulletin in 1896 and 1897, and his last children's book was published in 1939.

== Bibliography ==
=== Novels ===
- Where Eagles Build (1925)
- Broad Acres (1939)

=== Poetry collections ===
- War Verses (1915)
- Australia in Peace and War (1917)

=== Children's ===
- Bunyip Says So : A Tale of the Australian Bush (1922)
- Bunyip Told Me (1926)
- The Hunted Piccaninnies (1927)
- Jessie the Elephant : Her Life Story (1939)

Parliament of Australia
Preceded by William Johnson	Member for Robertson; 1913–1922	Succeeded by Sydney Gardner
New South Wales Legislative Assembly
Preceded by Robert Fitzgerald	Member for Robertson; 1901–1904	District abolished
New district	Member for Upper Hunter; 1904–1910	Succeeded by William Ashford
Party political offices
Preceded by Henry Gregory	Deputy Leader of the Country Party of Australia; 1922	Succeeded by William Gibson
