= Thomas Dangar =

Australian politician

Thomas Dangar (13 March 1808 – 13 March 1878) was an English-born Australian politician.

He was born at St Neot in Cornwall to William Dangar and Judith Hooper. His obituary in the Sydney Morning Herald gives his date of birth as 13 March 1808, while his parliamentary biography gives it as 1 February 1807. His two brothers, Henry Dangar and William Danger, migrated to New South Wales and he followed them, arriving on 13 March 1825. He first worked in Sydney and then establishing a business at West Maitland in 1834. On 31 October 1832 he married Charlotte Selina Gibbons née Hutchinson, who was widowed, with one son Tom who took the surname Dangar. In 1836 he became Scone's first postmaster, also establishing a local inn and store. He opened another store at Muswellbrook, but in 1860 returned to Sydney.

In 1861 he was elected to the New South Wales Legislative Assembly for Upper Hunter, but he was defeated in 1864. Both his stepson, Tom, and his nephew, Henry Cary Dangar, would also become members of the Legislative Assembly.

Dangar died at Lavender Bay in 1878 (aged 70 or 71).

New South Wales Legislative Assembly
Preceded by John Robertson	Member for Upper Hunter; 1861–1864	Succeeded by James White
