= Frank White (Australian politician) =

Pastoralist and politician in New South Wales, Australia

Francis White
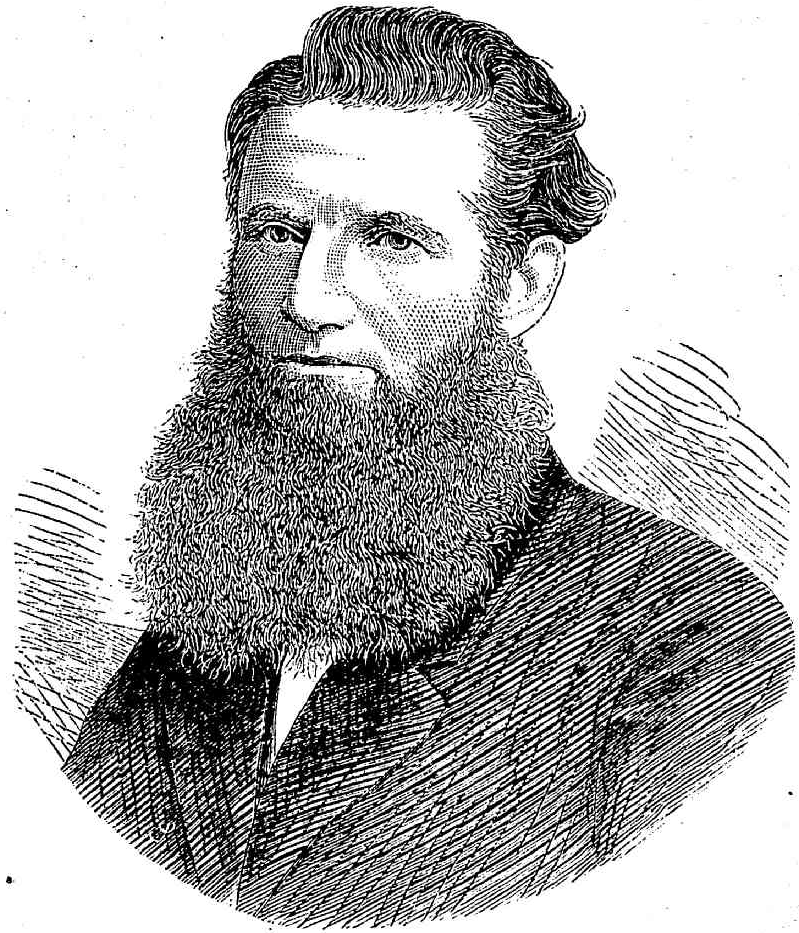

Member of the New South Wales Legislative Assembly for Upper Hunter
- In office 28 December 1874 – 4 May 1875
- Preceded by: John Creed
- Succeeded by: Thomas Hungerford

Personal details
- Born: 21 April 1830 Ravensworth
- Died: 4 May 1875 (aged 45) Edinglassie
- Occupation: Pastoralist, politician

Francis John White (21 April 1830 – 4 May 1875) was a pastoralist and politician in New South Wales, Australia.

== Early life ==
White was born at Ravensworth to overseer James White and Sarah Crossman, the 3rd of 10 children, Jane, James, George, Sarah, William Edward, Frederick Robert, Edward, Henry Charles, and Jane. He was educated by the Reverend John Gregor at West Maitland and then Dr Aitken. His father died in 1842 when he was aged 11.

== Land ownership and squatting ==
He qualified as a surveyor however he returned to work on the family property, Edinglassie, near Muswellbrook, which he operated in partnership with his brothers James and George. On 6 July 1853 he married Mary Hannah Cobb. In 1848 the brothers leased Belltrees near Scone from William Wentworth buying the property in 1853. He later bought further land in the Liverpool Plains and New England, including Saumarez, in partnership with his brothers, making them some of the leading squatters in the colony.

== Public office ==
White was appointed a magistrate in 1855, later becoming chairman of the bench of magistrates. His brother William was the minister at the Episcopal Church in Muswellbrook and the church was built chiefly by donations from the White family. He was president of the local Agricultural Society, and took an active part in the management of the Muswellbrook Hospital and the Benevolent Society of Muswellbrook.

== Politics ==
In 1874 he was elected to the New South Wales Legislative Assembly for Upper Hunter, but he died the following year. His brother, James, had represented the Upper Hunter from 1864 until 1868 and had been appointed to the Legislative Council in 1874.

== Death ==
White died at Edinglassie on 4 May 1875 (aged 45), survived by Mary and 7 of their children. His obituary published by the Maitland Mercury gave his cause of death as typhoid fever, however it subsequently published a denial which stated he had been suffering from a remittent fever for six weeks, with no sign of typhoid.

== Family ==
White had 10 children with Mary, the eldest also named Francis John, James, Walter, Henry, Mary, William, Arthur, Victor, Adelaide and John.

New South Wales Legislative Assembly
Preceded by John Creed	Member for Upper Hunter; 1874–1875	Succeeded by Thomas Hungerford
