= Robert Fitzgerald (Australian politician) =

Australian politician

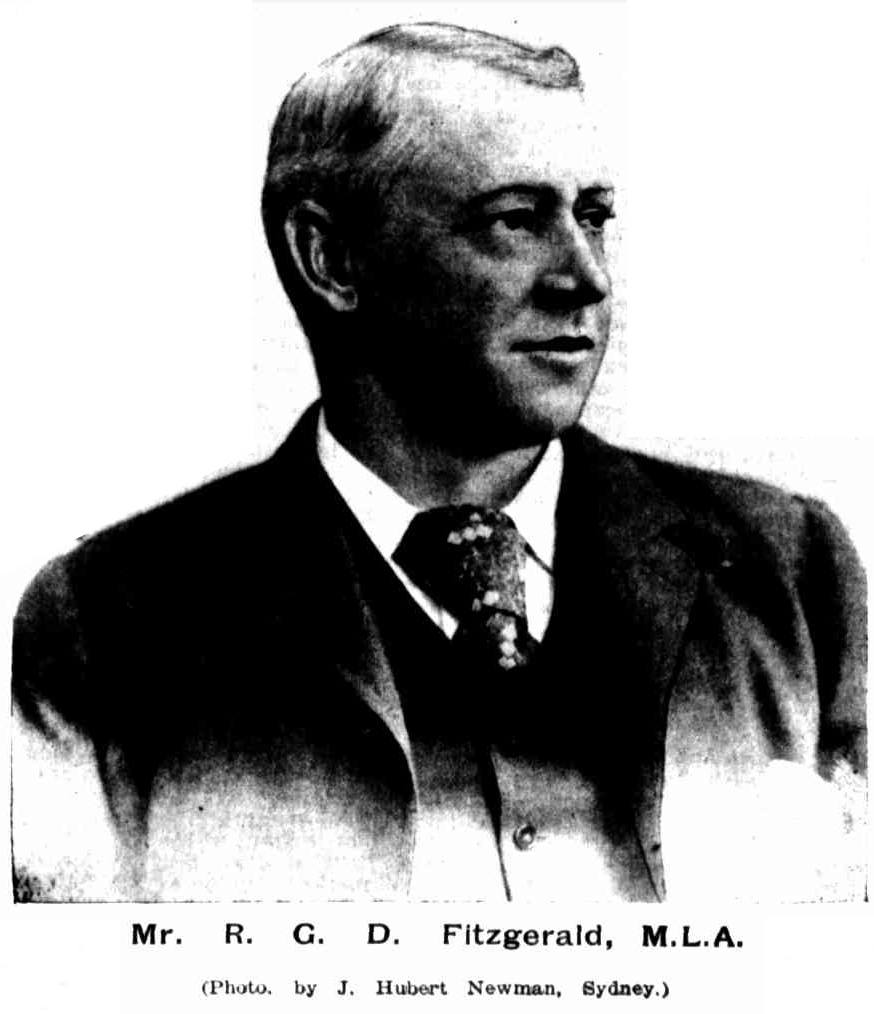
- Born: 5 January 1846; Auckland, New Zealand
- Died: 24 December 1933 (aged 87); Muswellbrook, New South Wales

Robert George Dundas Fitzgerald (5 January 1846 – 24 December 1933) was a New Zealand-born Australian politician.

He was born at Auckland to cotton planter Robert Appleyard Fitzgerald and Isabella Stevenson. The family moved to New South Wales in 1851 and Fitzgerald attended Sydney Grammar School and also a private school at Muswellbrook. He then became a solicitor's clerk in Maitland and was admitted a solicitor in 1869. In 1870 he married Elizabeth Frances Mary Batten, with whom he had a daughter. He established a partnership in Muswellbrook, and served as a local alderman (1871–73, 1878–80, 1885–86) and mayor (1878–79).

In 1885 he was elected to the New South Wales Legislative Assembly as one of the two members for Upper Hunter. Although associated with the Free Trade Party early in his career, by 1889 he was a Protectionist. In 1894 he was elected the member for the single-member seat of Robertson. In April 1901 he was appointed Minister of Justice in the See ministry, but was defeated at the 1901 election for Robertson. He was appointed to the New South Wales Legislative Council in September but did not have any further ministerial or parliamentary appointment, serving until his death in 1933.

== Honours ==
The Fitzgerald Bridge over the Hunter River in Aberdeen, a structure built in 1893 and listed on the Register of the National Estate, was opened by Fitzgerald and is believed to be named for him.

Parliament of New South Wales
Political offices
Preceded by William Wood	Minister of Justice; April – July 1901	Succeeded by Bernhard Wise
New South Wales Legislative Assembly
Preceded by John McElhone; John McLaughlin	Member for Upper Hunter; 1885 – 1894; With: Hungerford/McElhone/Abbott/Williams	District abolished
New seat	Member for Robertson; 1894 – 1901	Succeeded by William Fleming
