= William Cameron (Australian politician) =

Australian politician (1877–1931)

William Cameron (6 July 1877 – 6 May 1931) was an Australian politician.

== Life and career ==
Cameron was born at Rouchel Brook, south-east of Scone, to grazier Donald Cameron and Elizabeth, née McMullen. After serving in the Boer War, he settled near Scone as a grazier and became active in the local community, serving on the Upper Hunter Pastoral Protection Board, the Graziers' Association and Upper Hunter Shire Council and supporting the New England New State Movement.

He was well known in the district as a cricketer, a clever leg-spin bowler and big-hitting batsman. He toured Ceylon with a New South Wales cricket team led by Mick Waddy in 1914. He was the leading bowler on the tour, taking 36 wickets at an average of 6.80.

In 1918 he was elected to the New South Wales Legislative Assembly as the Nationalist member for Upper Hunter. He was one of the members of Maitland while proportional representation was used from 1920 to 1927, and represented Upper Hunter again from 1927 until his death in Muswellbrook in 1931. He left a wife and six children.

New South Wales Legislative Assembly
Preceded by Mac Abbott	Member for Upper Hunter; 1918–1920	Succeeded by Seat abolished
Preceded by Charles Nicholson	Member for Maitland; 1920–1927; Served alongside: Bennett, O'Hearn	Succeeded by Walter O'Hearn
Preceded by New seat	Member for Upper Hunter; 1927–1931	Succeeded by Malcolm Brown
