= Electoral district of Robertson =

Former state electoral district of New South Wales, Australia

Robertson was an electoral district of the Legislative Assembly in the Australian state of New South Wales from 1894 to 1904, in the upper Hunter Region around Scone and named after John Robertson. The district was created when multi-member constituencies were abolished in 1894, and comprised the eastern part of the Upper Hunter and the western part of Patrick's Plains. The district was abolished in 1904 as a result of the 1903 New South Wales referendum, which reduced the number of members of the Legislative Assembly from 125 to 90, and largely replaced by a re-created Upper Hunter.

== Members for Robertson ==
| Member | Party | Term |
|---|---|---|
| Robert Fitzgerald | Protectionist | 1894–1901 |
| William Fleming | Liberal Reform | 1901–1904 |

== Election results ==
1901 New South Wales state election: Robertson
| Party | Candidate | Votes | % | ±% |
|---|---|---|---|---|
| Liberal Reform | William Fleming | 1,017 | 50.7 | +12.3 |
| Progressive | Robert Fitzgerald (defeated) | 991 | 49.4 | −12.3 |
| Total formal votes | | 2,008 | 98.8 | +0.4 |
| Informal votes | | 24 | 1.2 | −0.4 |
| Turnout | | 2,032 | 68.3 | +6.6 |
| Liberal Reform gain from Progressive | | | | |
