= Electoral district of Upper Hunter =

State electoral district of New South Wales, Australia

Upper Hunter New South Wales—Legislative Assembly
- Interactive map of district boundaries from the 2023 state election
- State: New South Wales
- Dates current: 1856–1894; 1904–1920; 1927–present
- MP: Dave Layzell
- Party: National
- Namesake: Upper Hunter Shire
- Electors: 62,282 (2023)
- Area: 27,687.50 km^{2} (10,690.2 sq mi)
- Demographic: Rural
Electorates around Upper Hunter:
Barwon	Northern Tablelands	Northern Tablelands
Dubbo	Upper Hunter	Myall Lakes
Bathurst	Cessnock	Port Stephens

Upper Hunter is an electoral district of the Legislative Assembly in the Australian state of New South Wales. The seat is currently held by Dave Layzell for the National Party after he was elected at a by-election to replace Michael Johnsen.

Upper Hunter covers the entirety of Dungog Shire, Muswellbrook Shire, Upper Hunter Shire, Singleton Shire, part of the City of Cessnock (including Branxton) and all of the City of Maitland north of the Hunter River.

== History ==
In 1859, Upper Hunter replaced the Electoral district of Phillip, Brisbane and Bligh, established in the first Parliament in 1856. It had two members from 1880 to 1894. It was abolished in 1894 and largely replaced by Robertson and Singleton. In 1904 Robertson was abolished and Upper Hunter was recreated. It was abolished from 1920 with the introduction of proportional representation, but was recreated in 1927.

Upper Hunter is one of three electorates to have never been held by the Labor Party and always by the conservative side of politics since the abolition of proportional representation in 1927, the other two being Tamworth and Oxley. The Nationals have held the district without interruption since 1931.

== Members for Upper Hunter ==
=== First incarnation 1856–1894 ===
1859–1880, 1 member
Member	Party	Term
John Robertson	None	1859–1861
Thomas Dangar	None	1861–1864
James White	None	1864–1868
Archibald Bell	None	1868–1872
John Creed	None	1872–1874
Francis White	None	1874–1875
Thomas Hungerford	None	1875–1875
John McElhone	None	1875–1880

1880–1894, 2 members
Member	Party	Term	Member	Party	Term
John McLaughlin	None	1880–1885	John McElhone	None	1880–1885
Robert Fitzgerald	None	1885–1887	Thomas Hungerford	None	1885–1887
Robert Fitzgerald	Free Trade	1887–1889	John McElhone	Free Trade	1887–1889
Robert Fitzgerald	Protectionist	1889–1894	William Abbott	Protectionist	1889–1891
Robert Fitzgerald	Protectionist	1889–1894	Thomas Williams	Labor	1891–1894

=== Second incarnation 1904–1920 ===
1904–1920, 1 member
Member	Party	Term
William Fleming	Liberal Reform	1904–1910
William Ashford	Labor	1910–1910
Henry Willis	Liberal Reform	1910–1913
Henry Willis	Independent Liberal	1913–1913
Mac Abbott	Liberal Reform	1913–1917
Mac Abbott	Nationalist	1917–1918
William Cameron	Nationalist	1918–1920

=== Third incarnation 1927–present ===
1927–present, 1 member
Member	Party	Term
William Cameron	Nationalist	1927–1931
Malcolm Brown	Independent Country	1931–1932
Malcolm Brown	Country	1932–1939
D'Arcy Rose	Country	1939–1959
Leon Punch	Country	1959–1962
Frank O'Keefe	Country	1962–1969
Col Fisher	Country, National	1970–1988
George Souris	National	1988–2015
Michael Johnsen	National	2015–2021
Dave Layzell	National	2021–present

== Election results ==
2023 New South Wales state election: Upper Hunter
Party	Candidate	Votes	%	±%
National	Dave Layzell	19,868	37.0	+7.6
Labor	Peree Watson	15,488	28.9	−2.0
Shooters, Fishers, Farmers	James White	6,302	11.7	−7.3
Independent	Dale McNamara	5,190	9.7	+9.7
Greens	Tony Lonergan	3,207	6.0	+0.5
Legalise Cannabis	Tom Lillicrap	2,743	5.1	+5.1
Sustainable Australia	Calum Blair	862	1.6	+1.6
Total formal votes		53,660	96.6	+0.1
Informal votes		1,871	3.4	−0.1
Turnout		55,531	89.2	−2.5
Two-party-preferred result
National	Dave Layzell	22,964	53.8	+3.3
Labor	Peree Watson	19,732	46.2	−3.3
National hold		Swing	+3.3	
