= 1886 Melbourne Cup =

Annual horse race in Victoria, Australia

- Melbourne Cup
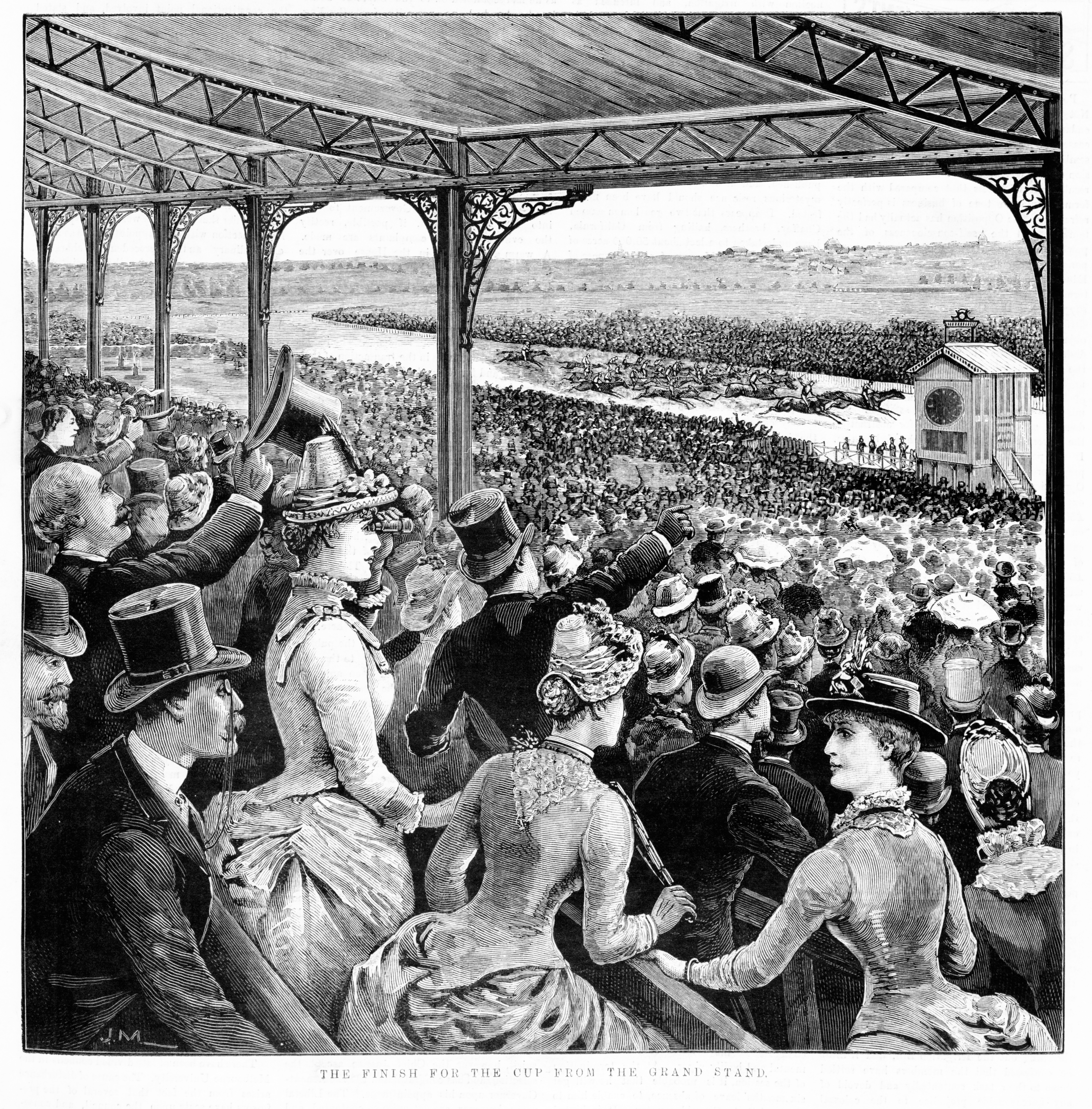
- The finish of the 1886 Melbourne Cup from the grand stand
- Location: Flemington Racecourse
- Date: 2 November 1886
- Distance: 2 miles
- Winning horse: Arsenal
- Winning time: 3:31.0
- Final odds: 20/1
- Jockey: William English
- Trainer: Harry Rayner
- Owner: William Gannon
- Conditions: Good
- Surface: Turf
- Attendance: ≈140,000

The 1886 Melbourne Cup was a two-mile handicap horse race which took place on Tuesday, 2 November 1886.

This year was the twenty-sixth running of the Melbourne Cup. The race was won by four-year-old stallion Arsenal, who had been lightly raced in 1886 after running unplaced in the 1885 Melbourne Cup.

For owner William Gannon the proprietor of Petty's Hotel in Sydney, the Melbourne Cup was his greatest sporting triumph and it was said that he was generous with his winnings giving "money away with both hands, and few who needed and deserved had to ask twice."

== Entries and odds ==
From an initial subscription of 143 entries, 38 runners had paid the final entry fee. The top-weighted runner was 1884 Melbourne Cup winner Malua. Ridden by its owner John Ord Inglis, Malua had won ten races in its career including the Newmarket Handicap and Adelaide Cup in 1884, as well as the Australian Cup at Flemington earlier in 1886. It was thought though that the handicap of 10 st 0 lb (63.5 kg) might be a little too for the horse to feature among the placegetters. The horse that Malua beat in the 1884 race, Commotion was a popular choice among observers, although its odds went out to 25/1 in the betting markets due to injury concerns.

The 1885 Melbourne Cup winner Sheet Anchor was seen as an outside chance of winning the race again for owner Martin Loughlin, while 1885 runner-up Grace Darling was similarly thought of as an outside chance at 33/1. Instead it was 1885 third placegetter Trenton that was more fancied to reverse its fortunes in the race. Having been blocked in its run to finish third, experts suggested that it would be hard to beat one year later, although there were concerns it had pulled up lame earlier in the spring racing season.

Following wins in the Caulfield Stakes, Moonee Valley Cup, and Melbourne Stakes, Isonomy was the form runner of the field and had been backed into odds of 6/1. Winner of the Metropolitan Handicap, Bohemian was thought that the two-mile distance might be too far for it, but from the Sydney horses, it was James White's Trident that had been supported into overall favouritism of 5/1 to win the Cup. Trident had been purchased by White from Etienne de Mestre's auction sale for £800 and as a three-year-old won the 1886 AJC Derby at Randwick. The horse backed up and won the Craven Plate and Randwick Plate in the same week. Ahead of the Melbourne Cup, Trident was the short-priced favourite to win the Victoria Derby, winning the race and equalling the race record time, despite some interference from stablemate Volcano. Champion jockey Tom Hales rode Trident in those wins and was again booked to ride the horse in the Melbourne Cup. Poet Banjo Paterson penned a poem titled Dream of the Melbourne Cup published by The Bulletin in the lead up to the race where he imagined Trident winning the race.

Of the other runners, it was doubted that many would feature in the finish, with the chances of Arsenal discounted as it was not "likely to develop staying abilities." Hexham had finished second behind Claptrap in the Hotham Handicap and was yet to register its maiden victory, while Bravo had finished a distant third behind Isonomy and Boolka in the Melbourne Stakes. Isonomy won a dead heat run off race by three lengths over Boolka to claim the Melbourne Stakes. Caulfield Cup winner Ben Bolt was thought to have good stamina for a Cup runner and seemingly liked the longer distance events. From the lighter-weighted runners, Little John was seen as a strong chance, especially with veteran jockey Sam Cracknell as its rider.

== The race ==
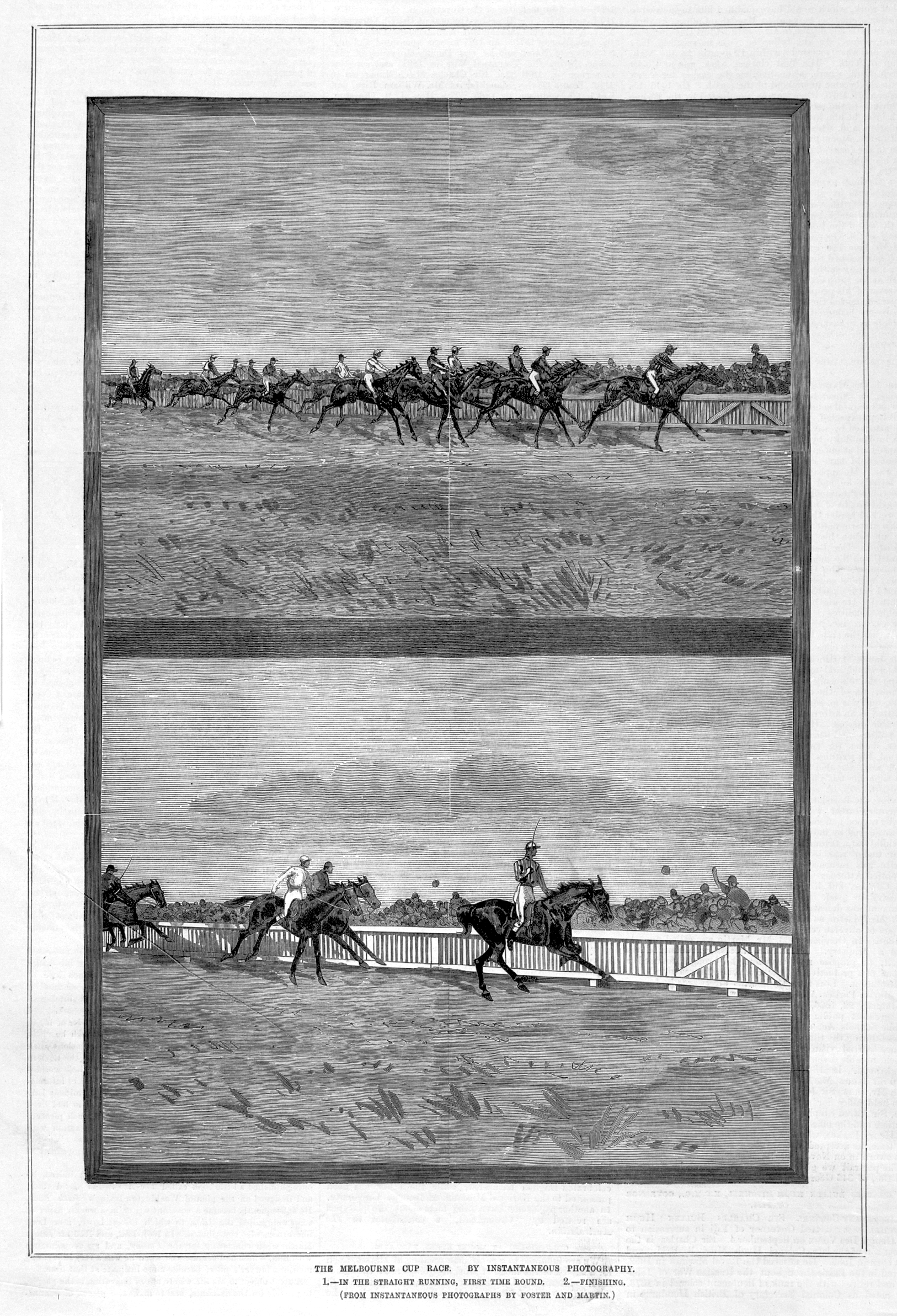
"Instantaneous photograph" of the race published in the Australian Sketcher.

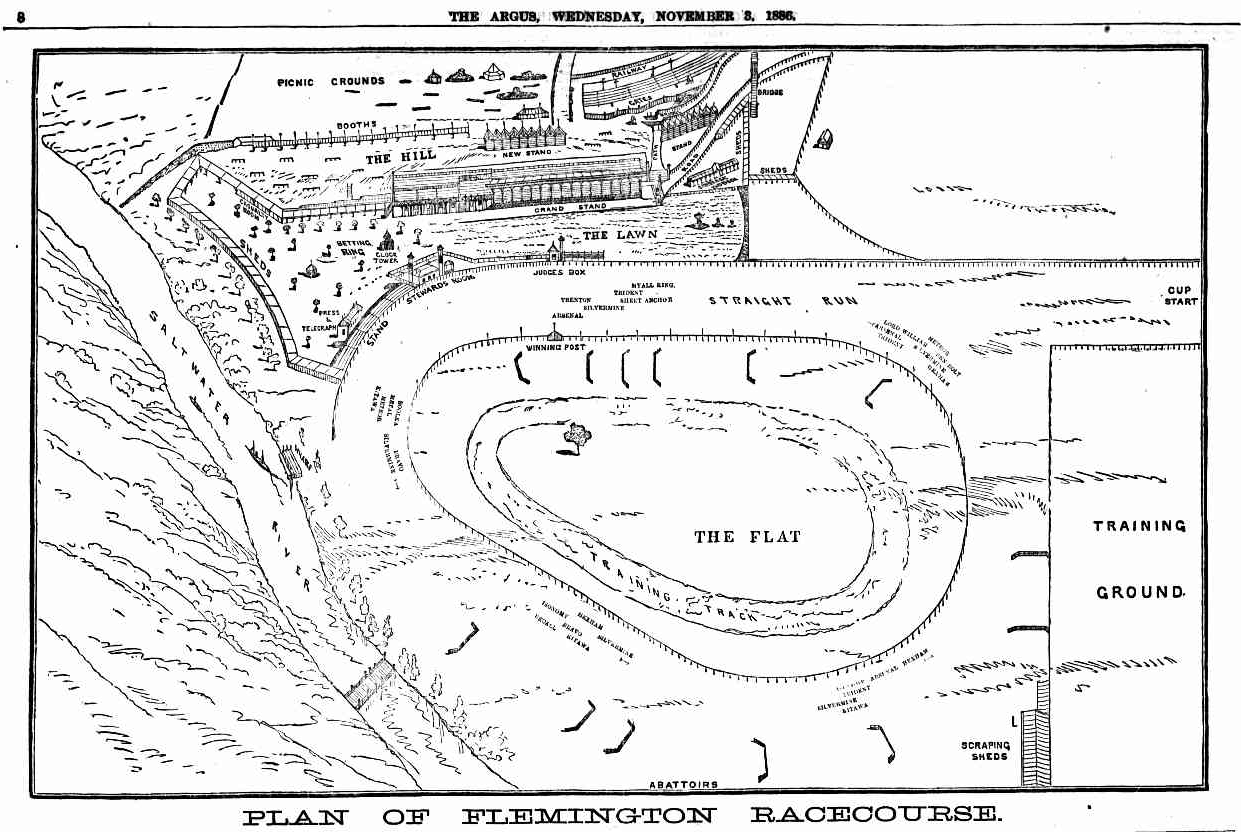
Map of the Flemington Racecourse showing the placing of runners published in The Argus.

A final field of 28 runners gathered for the start on a warm, partially sunny afternoon. Following the drop of the flag, Silvermine gained the early lead entering the course proper, and was joined by Metal and Boolka, while Little John brought up the rear of the field. Bravo joined the leaders as they headed for the first turn, with Silvermine and Bravo running side by side as the turned to run down the river side of the course. Silvermine maintained the lead until it was joined by Hexham about a mile from the winning post, while Metal suffered interference and dropped back. Stablemate of the favourite Trident, Hexham gained a lead of two lengths over the favourite, with Arsenal running ahead of a pack including Lord William, Crossfire, Bravo, Kitewa, Meteor, Myall King, Ben Bolt and Bohemian.

With half a mile to go, Trident took the lead momentarily, but Hexham took it straight back, while Arsenal continued to draw closer. As the runners took the final turn into the straight, Hexham's race was done and Arsenal started to sprint home. Lord William had the rails run, with Meteor, Ben Bolt, Silvermine, Sheet Anchor and Trenton forming the chasers behind Arsenal and Trident. Down the straight, Arsenal had jumped to what looked like a winning lead, while Trident wilted and faded, eventually finishing fourth. Going past Trident were Trenton who almost drew level with Arsenal in the final fifty yards, with Silvermine finishing third a length in front of Trident. Sheet Anchor finished a commendable fifth, while Malua came home strongly to finish eighth.

The win was just Arsenal's second career victory. It only other win was as a two-year-old in the Criterion Stakes held over five furlongs. The horse had been sold by to publican William Gannon by New South Wales parlimentarian William Pearson following its poor performance in the 1885 Melbourne Cup. Gannon sent the horse to be trained by Harry Raynor at Randwick Racecourse, with the trainer assisted by young jockey William (Billy) English. The pair had decided against racing Arsenal in any of the lead up races, so the victory in the Cup coming off a long spell was a surprise to many observers. After arriving in Melbourne a week before the race, Arsenal "would not touch his oats," with its connections advised to "put a pony" in the stall with the horse.

Following the race, rumours circulated that Arsenal was not the horse sold by Pearson in 1885, rather it was James Wilson's horse Off Colour who had been withdrawn from the 1883 event now racing under the Arsenal moniker. No protests were lodged though and the rumour was only perpetuated by those that had lost money on other runners, due to the so-called mysterious and secretive preparation of the horse, and the way it had improved without any public racing.

The winning jockey, Billy English from Maitland, New South Wales, was only 19-years-old when he won the Cup. Telling the press:

I settled him comfortably into his stride without bustling him. I let him go comfortably will coming into the turn into the straight, when I again took hold of him, and he went away with a dash of foot that I thought we could win. I saw after a few yards that Trenton was keeping stride for stride with Arsenal. I could not get any farther away, and I was very glad he could not get any nearer. I was very glad to keep him where he was. Arsenal did his best and I knew he would. He was all out at the finish. He was fit and well today, and is never likely to be a better horse than when he won the Cup.

A new grandstand increased capacity at Flemington, as well as other improvements including an electric public address system led to an estimated attendance of just short of 150,000 people. Dignitaries in attendance included the colonial governors of Victoria, New South Wales, South Australia and Tasmania. The VRC reported gate receipts of £3617, over £600 more than the previous year. Like in previous years, the attendees were entertained by the Australian Military Band conducted by Signor Zelman between races.

This would be the last Melbourne Cup where James White employed renowned Sydney trainer Michael Fennelly to train his horses. The pair had previously combined to win the 1883 Melbourne Cup with Martini-Henry. Fennelly would die of cancer in August 1887 at 47-years-old.

== Full results ==
This is the list of placegetters for the 1886 Melbourne Cup.

Place	Horse	Age Gender	Jockey	Weight	Trainer	Owner	Odds	Margin
1	Arsenal	4y h	William English	7 st 5 lb (46.7 kg) (Note: Was supposed to carry 7st 4lb)	Harry Rayner	William Gannon	20/1	Long neck
2	Trenton (NZL)	5y h	Alec Robertson (Note: Sometimes spelled Alick Robertson)	9 st 5 lb (59.4 kg)	Tom Lamond	William Cooper	12/1	1 length
3	Silvermine	5y h	Teddy McGrade	7 st 10 lb (49.0 kg)	Isaac Foulsham	Mr H.R. Falkner	14/1	2 lengths
4	Trident	3y c	Tom Hales	7 st 7 lb (47.6 kg)	Michael Fennelly	James White	5/1 fav.	
5	Sheet Anchor	8y h	Brickwood Colley	9 st 0 lb (57.2 kg)	Thomas Wilson	Martin Loughlin	33/1	
6	Myall King	4y g	Casey	6 st 9 lb (42.2 kg)	John Mayo	John Eales	100/1	
7	Crossfire	3y f	J. Bence	7 st 1 lb (44.9 kg)	Tom Brown	William A. Long	100/1	
8	Malua	7y h	John Ord Inglis	10 st 0 lb (63.5 kg)	John Ord Inglis	John Ord Inglis	14/1	
9	Bohemian	5y h	Gallagher	8 st 0 lb (50.8 kg)	Tommy Jones	Tommy Jones	25/1	
10	Ben Bolt	5y h	Mick O'Brien	7 st 10 lb (49.0 kg)	P. Kelly	Mr W. Strickland	8/1	
11	Bravo	3y c	Campbell	6 st 6 lb (40.8 kg)	Brennan	Mr W.E. Royd	50/1	
12	Hexham	4y h	Huxley	6 st 6 lb (40.8 kg) (Note: Was supposed to carry 6st 5lb)	Michael Fennelly	James White	25/1	
13	Lord William	3y c	Jim Gough	6 st 9 lb (42.2 kg)	W. Duggan	Mr W. Duggan	50/1	
14	Meteor	6y h	Fiddes	7 st 11 lb (49.4 kg)	J.D. Robertson	Mr R.K. Maitland	8/1	
15	Cyclops	4y h	Williamson	7 st 8 lb (48.1 kg) (Note: Was supposed to carry 7st 7lb)	W. Prestwych	Mr F. Henty	33/1	
16	Britisher	8y g	Fallon	7 st 13 lb (50.3 kg)	Thomas Wilson	Martin Loughlin	20/1	
17	Little John	6y h	Sam Cracknell	6 st 11 lb (43.1 kg)	W. Moran	Mr W. Moran	10/1	
18	Boolka	6y h	Olds	7 st 11 lb (49.4 kg) (Note: Was supposed to carry 7st 10lb)	H. Bellamy	Mr S. Miller	100/1	
19	Recall	4y h	Ted Gorry	6 st 11 lb (43.1 kg)	James Scobie	Mr R. Orr	100/1	
20	Commotion	8y h	Power	9 st 9 lb (61.2 kg)	Francis F. Dakin	William Pearson	25/1	
21	Lancer	6y g	B. Williams	7 st 9 lb (48.5 kg)	Thomas Ivory	Mr J.R. Smith	50/1	
22	Kitawa	4y h	Cox	7 st 9 lb (48.5 kg)	Phillips	Mr T. Coffey	50/1	
23	Jack Roach	5y g	D. Williams	6 st 2 lb (39.0 kg) (Note: Was supposed to carry 6st 0lb)	—N/a	Mr J. Calvert	50/1	
24	Isonomy	4y h	Quinn	8 st 3 lb (52.2 kg)	J.H. Hill	Mr M. Locke	6/1	
25	Highland Chief	4y h	Morrison	6 st 0 lb (38.1 kg)	N. Campbell	Richard Gilbert Talbot	100/1	
26	Monte Christo	4y h	Bob Ellis	7 st 9 lb (48.5 kg)	Michael Fennelly	James White	40/1	
27	Grace Darling	6y m	J. Williams	8 st 11 lb (55.8 kg)	J.G. Reid	Mr J.G. Reid	33/1	
Last	Metal	5y h	Tommy Sanders	7 st 2 lb (45.4 kg)	James Redfearn	Mr M. Jacobs	100/1	
SCR	Silver King	5y h	—N/a	7 st 8 lb (48.1 kg)	W. Baines	William Forrester		
SCR	Quintin Matsys	7y h	—N/a	7 st 5 lb (46.7 kg)	William E. Dakin	William E. Dakin		
SCR	Maddelina	3y f	—N/a	7 st 3 lb (45.8 kg)	A. Davis	William A. Long		
SCR	Kings Own	5y h	—N/a	7 st 2 lb (45.4 kg)	—N/a	Mr H. Kinsella		
SCR	Lesbia	7y m	—N/a	6 st 11 lb (43.1 kg)	Harry Chifney	Mr O. Barnett		
SCR	Fish O' Silver	4y h	—N/a	6 st 6 lb (40.8 kg)	Stodden	William J. Clarke		
SCR	Kingfish	3y c	—N/a	6 st 0 lb (38.1 kg)	Joe Monaghan	Mr W.H. Stockton		
SCR	Menotti	3y c	—N/a	6 st 0 lb (38.1 kg)	H. Yeend	William J. Clarke		
SCR	Salvo	5y h	—N/a	6 st 9 lb (42.2 kg)	T. Rennisop	Mr T. Bennison		
SCR	Affluence	4y h	—N/a	6 st 6 lb (40.8 kg)	H. Tothill	Mr J. Pile		

== Prizemoney ==
For the 1886 race, the Victoria Racing Club increased the prize money awarded, adding £2000 to the winner's sweepstakes, while also increasing the second prize by £200 and third prize by £100.

First prize £2865, second prize £500, third prize £300.

== See also ==
- Melbourne Cup
- List of Melbourne Cup winners
- Victoria Racing Club
