= 1885 Melbourne Cup =

Annual horse race in Victoria, Australia

- Melbourne Cup
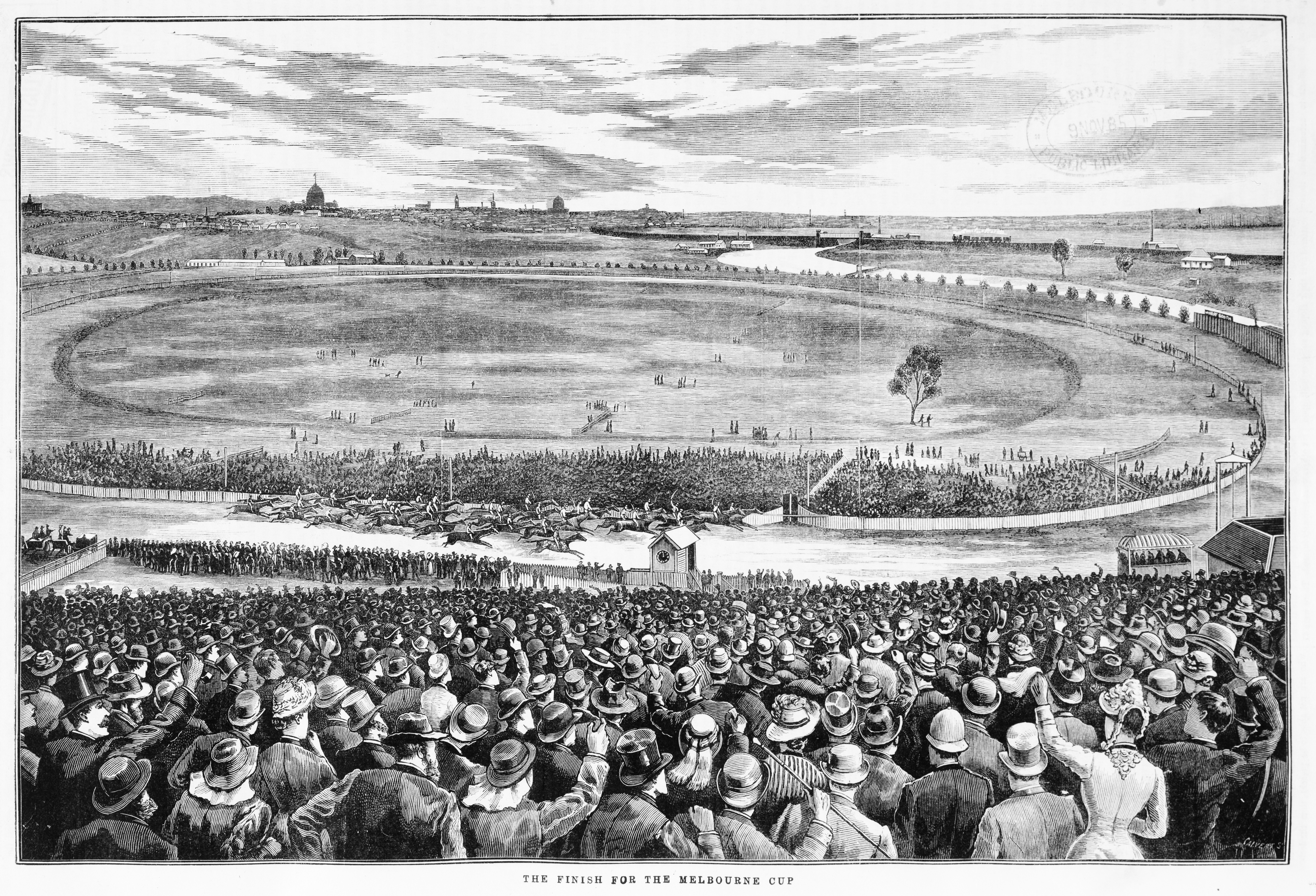
- Illustration of the finish of the race
- Location: Flemington Racecourse
- Date: 3 November 1885
- Distance: 2 miles
- Winning horse: Sheet Anchor
- Winning time: 3:29.50
- Final odds: 20/1
- Jockey: Mick O'Brien
- Trainer: Thomas Wilson
- Owner: Martin Loughlin
- Conditions: Good
- Surface: Turf
- Attendance: ≈130,000

The 1885 Melbourne Cup was a two-mile handicap horse race which took place on Tuesday, 3 November 1885.

This was the twenty-fifth running of the Melbourne Cup and was won by seven-year-old stallion Sheet Anchor in a close finish.

== Entries and odds ==
In the lead up to the running of the Melbourne Cup, tragedy had struck the Australian horse racing community, with 27-year-old jockey Donald Nicholson fatally injured from a fall during the running of the Caulfield Cup. Described as the worst fall in Australian history, Nicholson had been riding Lord Exeter when he was pushed into a post, thrown from his mount and killed instantly. There were up to a dozen other jockeys injured in the incident including Sam Cracknell and Teddy McGrade. A number of Melbourne Cup runners were also injured, including previous year's entries Claptrap, and Sardius, with Urara killed in the chaos.

The winner of the chaotic Caulfield Cup was six-year-old mare Grace Darling at 28/1, who beat out Britisher and Coriolanus. Grace Darling's chances for the Melbourne Cup were still seen as not very high, given the flukey nature of its win at Caulfield, with bookmakers offering odds of at least 20/1 for the Melbourne Cup. Also not heavily favoured was 1884 Caulfield Cup winner Blink Bonny.

New Zealand bred import Trenton was one of the favourites for the race, with the horse firming into 6/1 odds following its win in the Melbourne Stakes, easily beating Sheet Anchor. Jockey Alec Robertson was among the punters, reportedly placing a bet of £1,100 of his own money on his mount.

The betting favourite at odds of 5/1 was James White's colt Nordenfeldt, trained by Michael Fennelly. Bred by the same New Zealand company as 1883 Melbourne Cup winner, Martini-Henry, Nordenfeldt was also sired by Musket. Nordenfeldt had won the 1885 AJC Derby at Randwick in September, ahead of stablemate Uralla and First Chester. Nordenfeldt had dominated that race meeting, also winning the Spring Maiden Stakes, Craven Plate and Randwick Plate. Brought to Melbourne for the spring, Nordenfeldt again beat First Chester in the Victoria Derby, winning by a neck in heavy conditions. Stablemate Despot was seen as a chance to do well in the race with Nordenfeldt, with some observers also suggesting that Liverpool could win the Cup for Western Australia governor William C. F. Robinson.

== The race ==
In "beautifully fine" weather conditions, a field of 35 runners headed to the start, the largest number to start the race, eclipsing the 33 horses that started the 1881 race.

When the flag dropped to start the race, Brown and Rose jumped away to a strong start, while Yellow Hammer, Despot and Tom Brown were at the back of the field. First Chester would lead the pack onto the course proper, and was joined by Prometheus. Thunderbolt and First Chester rounded the first turn at the head of the field, while Grace Darling was at the rear of the field with Yellow Hammer. On the riverside straight, First Chester and Thunderbolt extended their lead to a length in front of the chasing pack, with Prometheus, Trenton, the favourite Nordenfeldt and Sheet Anchor among the forward runners. At the mile marker, First Chester had left behind Thunderbolt to establish a two-lengths lead. Soon though, First Chester was joined by Velocipede and Metal, with Nordenfeldt, Despot and Grace Darling close behind. First Chester had run its race with the field nearing the final turn, ceding the lead to Metal. With half a mile remaining, Velocipede and Minerva had the lead marginally ahead of a large pack. At the final turn, it was Sheet Anchor led the field into the straight, bringing Minerva and Grace Darling along. Down the final stretch, Sheet Anchor and Trenton were engaged in a sprint to the line. Jack Williams riding on board Grace Darling extracted a final burst out of his ride to join the two in the lead. In a three-way finish between Sheet Anchor, Grace Darling, and Trenton, it was Mick O'Brien on board Sheet Anchor that won the Melbourne Cup, a short head ahead of Grace Darling with Trenton just behind in third. Before the final turn, Alec Robertson riding on Trenton dropped his whip. Unable to convince another rider to give him theirs, Robertson was unable to draw much out of his ride down the straight to match Sheet Anchor or Grace Darling. Nordenfeldt finished fourth, finishing ahead of Minerva and Lesbia. Dunlop, Thunderbolt and Bosworth were among the last runners, with Yellow Hammer last of all, a long way behind the finish.

Trainer of Nordenfeldt, Michael Fennelly, maintained that his horse should have won but for two bouts of interference during the race. Like with Trenton, it was thought that jockey Bob Ellis had lost his whip during the interference encountered by Nordenfeldt.

Victoria Racing Club handicapper E.T. Barnard regarded the race was the best he ever saw in Australia.

Sheet Anchor had raced as a three-year-old in Tasmania, placing second in the Carrick Plate, also placing third in the Launceston Cup as a four-year-old. It won the President's Cup and Free Handicap in Hobart as a five-year-old, with its first notable win coming in the 1884 Launceston Cup. As a six-year-old, Sheet Anchor finished third in the Newmarket Handicap and came second in the 1885 Australian Cup behind Ringwood. The Melbourne Cup was its first major racing victory, beating the record time to be the first winner to run below 3:30. Owned by Irish immigrant Martin Loughlin who was mining investor from the Ballarat area. He had backed Sheet Anchor heavily, winning at least £24,000, donating £2,500 to Ballarat and other charities. Loughlin purchased Sheet Anchor from Richard Gilbert Talbot following the horse's lack of success at the 1885 autumn races in Sydney. It was the first Melbourne Cup wins for both trainer Thomas Wilson and jockey Mick O'Brien.

It was estimated that 130,000 people attended the racecourse, which was "a considerable advance upon last year." Dignitaries who attended the race included governors of Victoria, South Australia, and Western Australia, with the Australian Military Band playing music between the race program.

== Full results ==
This is the list of placegetters for the 1885 Melbourne Cup.

Place	Horse	Age Gender	Jockey	Weight	Trainer	Owner	Odds	Margin
1	Sheet Anchor	7y h	Mick O'Brien	7 st 11 lb (49.4 kg)	Thomas Wilson	Martin Loughlin	20/1	Head
2	Grace Darling	6y m	Jack Williams	7 st 12 lb (49.9 kg)	J.G. Reid	Mr J.G. Reid	20/1	½ Head
3	Trenton (NZL)	4y h	Alec Robertson (Note: Sometimes spelled Alick Robertson)	7 st 13 lb (50.3 kg)	Dan O'Brien	Dan O'Brien	6/1	¾ length
4	Nordenfeldt (NZL)	3y c	Bob Ellis	7 st 5 lb (46.7 kg)	Michael Fennelly	James White	5/1 fav.	
5	Minerva	5y m	Curran	6 st 8 lb (41.7 kg)	William Yeomans	Mr H.J. Bowler	66/1	
6	Lesbia	6y m	McDowell	6 st 5 lb (40.4 kg)	Harry Chifney	Mr S. Davis	100/1	
7	St. Lawrence	5y h	Smith	7 st 9 lb (48.5 kg)	T. Coffey	Abraham Halinbourg	100/1	
8	Velocipede	5y h	Burton	7 st 4 lb (46.3 kg)	R. Bence	Mr W. Condron	66/1	
9	Acolyte	4y h	Tommy Sanders	7 st 4 lb (46.3 kg)	T. Coffey	Abraham Halinbourg	20/1	
—N/a	First Chester	3y c	G. Williams	6 st 10 lb (42.6 kg)	Bill Kelso	Bill Kelso	40/1	
—N/a	Blink Bonny	7y m	Blair	8 st 5 lb (53.1 kg)	T. Jones	Richard Gilbert Talbot	50/1	
—N/a	Lord Wilton	5y h	C. Ivimy	8 st 0 lb (50.8 kg)	F. McNamara	Mr E.W. Ellis	50/1	
—N/a	Tom Brown	5y h	J. Gainsford	8 st 0 lb (50.8 kg)	T. Brackenberg	Mr C.J. Brackenreg	30/1	
—N/a	Kit Nubbles	6y h	Brickwood Colley	7 st 12 lb (49.9 kg)	R. Phillips	Mr R. Phillips	20/1	
—N/a	Coriolanus	Aged h	Moore	7 st 12 lb (49.9 kg)	J.D. Robertson	Mr J.D. Robertson	30/1	
—N/a	Warwick	5y h	Jim Gough	7 st 9 lb (48.5 kg)	J. Baines	Arthur F. Smart	20/1	
—N/a	Plausible	6y g	Power	7 st 8 lb (48.1 kg)	Francis F. Dakin	William Pearson	33/1	
—N/a	Liverpool	4y h	Deeritt	7 st 8 lb (48.1 kg)	R. Derritt	William Robinson	10/1	
—N/a	Promotheus	6y h	Trahan	7 st 6 lb (47.2 kg)	J.R. Crooke	Mr J. Whittingham	30/1	
—N/a	Stornoway	4y h	Musgrove	7 st 5 lb (46.7 kg)	William Lang	Mr T. Henty	20/1	
—N/a	Hill Top	6y h	Warke	7 st 4 lb (46.3 kg)	James Redfearn	Mr M. Jacobs	50/1	
—N/a	St. John	5y h	Flanagan	7 st 3 lb (45.8 kg)	G.H. Read	Mr C.H.T. Hart	25/1	
—N/a	Despot	6y h	McAuliffe	7 st 2 lb (45.4 kg)	Michael Fennelly	James White	8/1	
—N/a	Lord Exeter	4y h	John Williamson	7 st 1 lb (44.9 kg)	Tom Brown	Mr W.R. Hall	25/1	
—N/a	Brown and Rose	4y m	A. Gough	7 st 0 lb (44.5 kg)	J. Baines	Arthur F. Smart	20/1	
—N/a	Wing	5y h	T. Nerriker	7 st 5 lb (46.7 kg)	J. Swan	Mr R. Rouse	50/1	
—N/a	Britisher	7y g	Fallon	6 st 11 lb (43.1 kg)	Thomas Wilson	Martin Loughlin	33/1	
—N/a	Arsenal	3y c	Brown	6 st 9 lb (42.2 kg)	Francis F. Dakin	William Pearson	33/1	
—N/a	Metal	4y h	George Redfearn	6 st 6 lb (40.8 kg)	James Redfearn	Mr M. Jacobs	25/1	
—N/a	Cyclops	3y c	Johnson	6 st 3 lb (39.5 kg)	W. Prestwych	Mr F. Henty	50/1	
—N/a	Cerise and Blue	4y h	Ted Gorry	6 st 0 lb (38.1 kg)	M. Thompson	Humphrey L. Oxenham	20/1	
—N/a	Dunlop	3y c	Foon	7 st 6 lb (47.2 kg)	R.G. Griffiths	Mr A.R. Robertson	50/1	
—N/a	Thunderbolt (NZL)	3y c	Huxtable	7 st 5 lb (46.7 kg)	R. Derritt	William Robinson	50/1	
—N/a	Bosworth	Aged h	Riley	7 st 9 lb (48.5 kg)	W. Peraso	Mr M. Bryant	100/1	
Last	Yellow Hammer	5y h	Guy	6 st 5 lb (40.4 kg) (Note: Was supposed to carry 6st 0lb)	Alfred Francis Bradshaw	Alfred Francis Bradshaw	200/1	
SCR	Honeydew	4y h	—N/a	7 st 9 lb (48.5 kg)	Tom Brown	William A. Long		
SCR	Uralia	3y f	—N/a	7 st 8 lb (48.1 kg)	Michael Fennelly	James White		
SCR	Remus	3y c	—N/a	6 st 9 lb (42.2 kg)	W. Prestwych	Mr S.G. Cook		
SCR	Winchester (late Manchester) (NZL)	3y c	—N/a	6 st 9 lb (42.2 kg)	R. Derritt	William Robinson		

== Prizemoney ==
First prize £2412, second prize £300, third prize £200.

== See also ==
- Melbourne Cup
- List of Melbourne Cup winners
- Victoria Racing Club
