= 1884 Melbourne Cup =

Annual horse race in Victoria, Australia

- Melbourne Cup
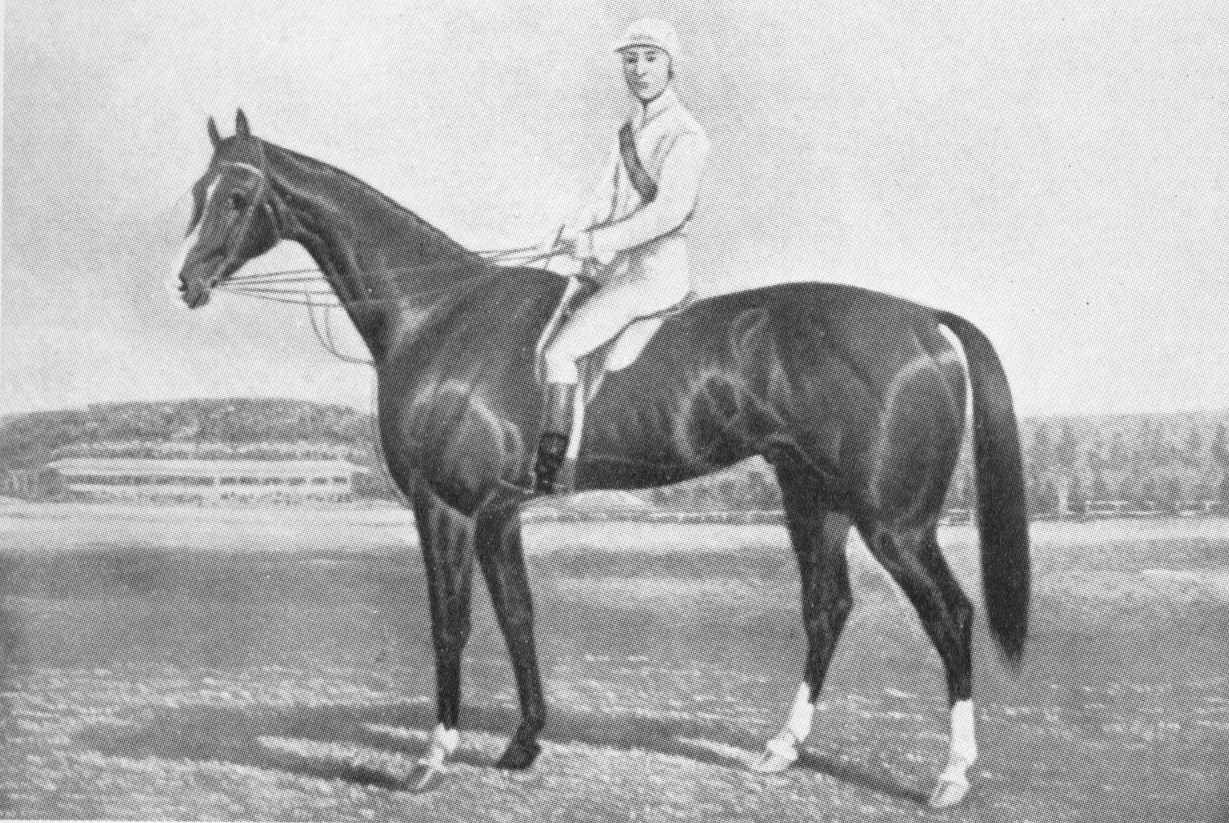
- 1884 Melbourne Cup winner Malua
- Location: Flemington Racecourse
- Date: 4 November 1884
- Distance: 2 miles
- Winning horse: Malua
- Winning time: 3:31.75
- Final odds: 6/1
- Jockey: Alec Robertson
- Trainer: Isaac Foulsham
- Owner: John Ord Inglis
- Surface: Turf
- Attendance: ≈100,000

The 1884 Melbourne Cup was a two-mile handicap horse race which took place on Tuesday, 4 November 1884.

This year was the twenty-fourth running of the Melbourne Cup. The race was won by five-year-old stallion Malua, owned by John Ord Inglis.

== Entries and odds ==
Praised before the race as "the greatest horse in the country" and as "having the greatest dash of foot of any horse we have seen this season," Malua was the pundits pick to win the race after winning the Melbourne Stakes on the Saturday before the race. The only query was whether it could finish strongly across the two miles.

Finishing a strong second in the Hotham Handicap, Hastings was seen as a strong chance across the two mile distance, with the horse eventually starting as the 5/1 favourite. Coming off a third placed finish in the Victoria Derby, Bargo was considered the strongest colt in the field following good form in Sydney, including winning the AJC Derby. After winning the Caulfield Cup at long odds, Tasmanian horse Blink Bonny showed that it would be hard to beat in the race, having beaten short-priced favourite Vergy. Of the other runners, there was some support for Off Colour, Hilltop and Claptrap.

Missing from the field were 1883 runners Le Grand, Despot and winner Martini-Henry, with Martini-Henry retired to stud after being injured running unplaced in the 1884 Caulfield Cup. Also not in the field was 1884 Metropolitan Handicap winner Sir Modred, while five-time winning trainer Etienne de Mestre was a notable absentee after financial and health problems saw his estate auctioned off in late 1883.

For the second year in a row, Commotion was the top-weighted runner, carrying 9 st 12 lb (62.6 kg), slightly less than what it had been handicapped when finishing third in 1883.

== The race ==
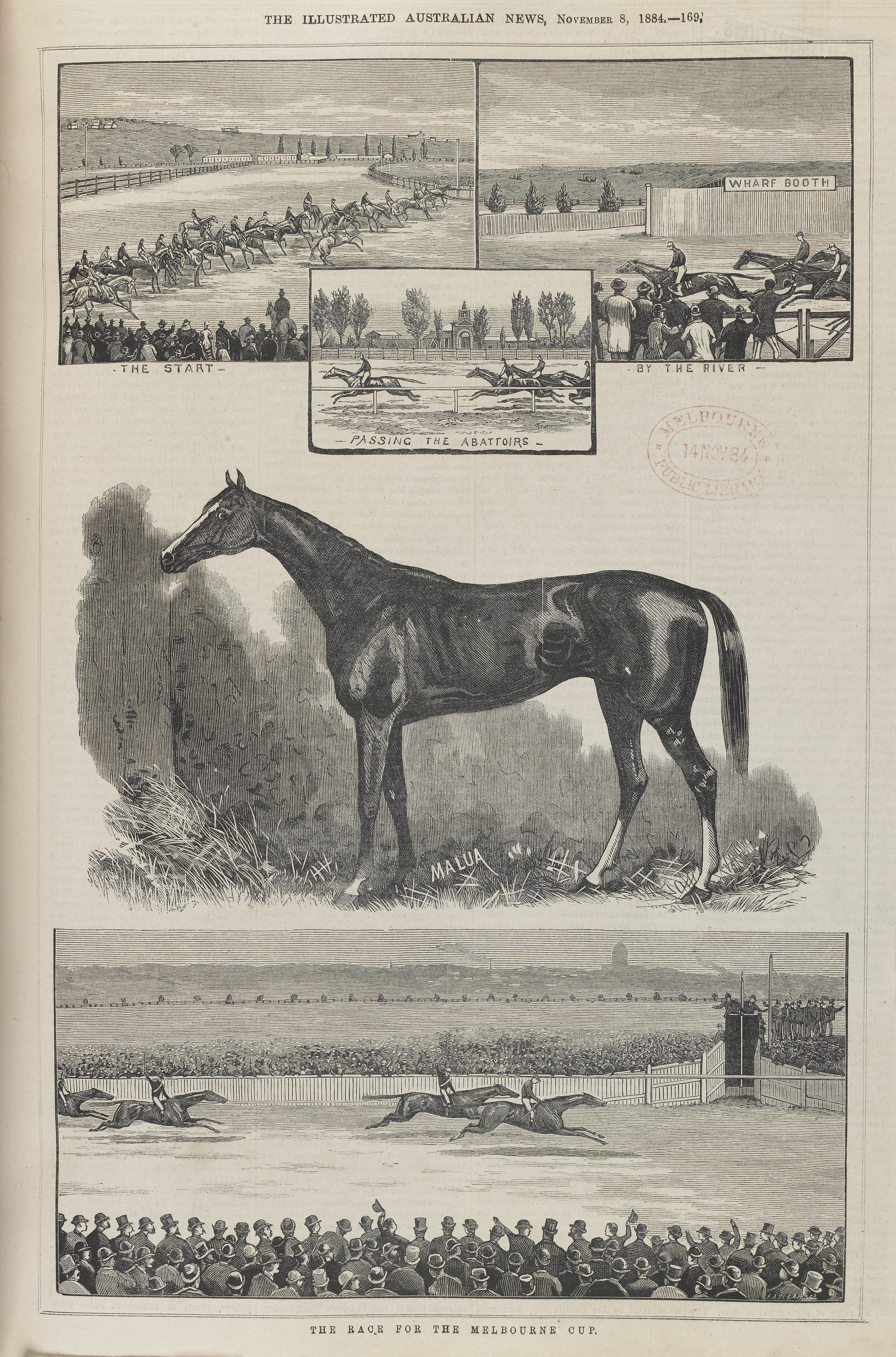
Illustrations of the 1884 Melbourne Cup published in The Illustrated Australian News

From the initial entry of 134 runners, 24 horses headed to the start under cloudless skies with a hint of a breeze.

An even start saw Hill Top find its way to the front of the field, in front of Vergy, Signor and Anchorite. Off Colour and Plausible brought up the rear of the field. Signor led the field past the stands and around the first turn, maintaining a lead of a length ahead of The Broker down the riverside part of the course. The Plunger made a move at the top of the course, but was running against Lord Clifden while trying to go forward. Able to shake loose, The Plunger took the lead as Signor faded, leading a pack which included Bargo, Hill Top, The Broker, Commotion, Plausible, Malua and Hastings. At the final turn, The Plunger led by three lengths from Commotion. Down the Flemington straight, The Plunger tired badly with Commotion taking the lead ahead of Plausible.To some observers it looked like Commotion had the race in its control, but down the outside Malua came with a rush, taking the lead in the final stages to win by half a length from a gallant Commotion. Plausible was third by more than two lengths having lost ground by swerving on the straight, heading a large group of runners. Bristol, Tremando, Claptrap and Merrimu the last to cross the line. The finishing time was the third fastest in the Melbourne Cup's history.

A brown-bay five-year-old stallion, Malua was bred in Tasmania and purchased by Thomas Reibey as a yearling where it raced under the moniker of Bagot. The horse was sold at auction to John Ord Inglis for £500 in November 1882. Malua won the Newmarket Handicap earlier in 1884, also winning the Oakleigh Handicap and Adelaide Cup, then the Spring Stakes at Randwick in the spring season before the Melbourne Cup.

As described in The Leader:

The Melbourne Cup of 1884 will long remain memorable for being associated with the victory of one of the best, if not the best, racehorses that ever tred Australia's turf. The performance was an equine triumph of the most pronounced order, and the style in which Malua cut down his field at the end of a severe two mile struggle under the crushing impact of 9st 9lb will not easily be obliterated from the memories of the thousands and tens of thousands who witnessed the spectacle. It was the conquest of a great horse in a great race and under what more judges of racing considered an annihilating burden. Nevertheless Malua accomplished the task assigned to him with comparitive ease, for there can be no mistaking that electric dash of his when he cut down the stable associates Commotion and Plausible in the last furlong, as if they were nothing more than a pair of common hacks.

It was the first Melbourne Cup win for owner John Ord Inglis, trainer Isaac Foulsham and jockey Alec Robertson. It was reported that Robertson rode "with commendable patience" to win the race in the final stages.

It was again estimated that a crowd of over 100,000 patrons attended the racecourse, with the "national holiday... rapidly becoming of wide intercolonial significance." At least half of those in attendance had made their way to the racecourse via railway using Melbourne's Spencer Street railway station.

== Full results ==
This is the list of placegetters for the 1884 Melbourne Cup.

Place	Horse	Age Gender	Jockey	Weight	Trainer	Owner	Odds	Margin
1	Malua	5y h	Alec Robertson (Note: Sometimes spelled Alick Robertson)	9 st 9 lb (61.2 kg)	Isaac Foulsham	John Ord Inglis	7/1	½ length
2	Commotion	6y h	Power	9 st 12 lb (62.6 kg)	Francis Dakin	William Pearson	20/1	2½ lengths
3	Plausible	5y g	Murphy	6 st 13 lb (44.0 kg)	Francis Dakin	William Pearson	10/1	4 lengths
4	Hastings (late Waterloo)	5y h	Teddy McGrade	7 st 13 lb (50.3 kg)	C.T. Roberts	Mr T. Sampson	5/1 fav.	
5	Boolka	5y h	Olds	7 st 7 lb (47.6 kg)	H. Bellamy	Mr S. Miller	33/1	
6	Battalious (late Brisbane)	5y h	J. Kelso	7 st 7 lb (47.6 kg)	Duggan	Mr M. Griffin	33/1	
7	Bargo	3y c	Tom Hales	7 st 6 lb (47.2 kg)	Michael Fennelly	James White	14/1	
8	The Plunger	5y h	Paddy Piggott	8 st 11 lb (55.8 kg)	James Redfearn	James Redfearn	12/1	
9	Lord Clifden	8y h	R. Davis	7 st 0 lb (44.5 kg) (Note: Was supposed to carry 6st 12lb)	E. Keys	Mr E. Keys	33/1	
10	Anchorite	4y h	T. Williams	6 st 11 lb (43.1 kg) (Note: Was supposed to carry 6st 9lb)	J.D. Robertson	Mr D.M. Robertson	50/1	
11	Lord Wilton	4y h	Sanders	6 st 11 lb (43.1 kg)	F. McNamara	Mr E.W. Ellis	50/1	
12	Brown and Rose	3y f	Jim Gough	7 st 3 lb (45.8 kg)	J. Baines	Arthur F. Smart	50/1	
13	Vergy	4y h	M. O'Brien	7 st 6 lb (47.2 kg)	William Lang	Mr J.A. Lang	12/1	
14	Off Colour	4y h	Moore	8 st 10 lb (55.3 kg)	James Wilson	William Branch	12/1	
15	Bonnie Bee	8y g	Trahan	7 st 5 lb (46.7 kg)	J. McDonald	Mr W.J. Forrester	50/1	
16	Hill Top	5y h	Donald Nicholson	7 st 2 lb (45.4 kg)	James Redfearn	Mr M. Jacobs	12/1	
17	Blink Bonny	6y m	John Williamson (Note: Also known as Jack Williamson)	7 st 7 lb (47.6 kg)	Thomas Wilson	Richard Gilbert Talbot	25/1	
—N/a	The Broker	3y c	Ettridge	7 st 1 lb (44.9 kg)	Joe Morrison	Mr A.R. Robertson	50/1	
—N/a	Signor	4y h	G. Williams	6 st 13 lb (44.0 kg)	W. Doyle	Mr E.P. Wilson	50/1	
—N/a	Hippogriff	3y c	Sam Cracknell	6 st 11 lb (43.1 kg)	W.H. Gray	Mr W.H. Gray	33/1	
—N/a	Bristol	4y h	Brickwood Colley	8 st 1 lb (51.3 kg)	D. Lawson	Mr J. Mondy	50/1	
—N/a	Claptrap	5y h	Charles Ivimy	7 st 4 lb (46.3 kg)	J.R. Crooke	John Whittingham	25/1	
—N/a	Tremando	3y c	Bob Ellis	6 st 9 lb (42.2 kg)	Michael Fennelly	James White	20/1	
Last	Merrimu	3y c	Bacchus	6 st 8 lb (41.7 kg)	J.R. Crooke	John Whittingham	50/1	
SCR	Guesswork	5y h	—N/a	8 st 12 lb (56.2 kg)	James Wilson Jr.	James Wilson Jr.		
SCR	Warwick	4y h	—N/a	8 st 8 lb (54.4 kg)	J. Baines	Arthur F. Smart		
SCR	Sir Garnet (late The Hebrew)	5y h	—N/a	7 st 8 lb (48.1 kg)	C.L. McDonald	Mr T. Barnfield		
SCR	Seahorse	3y c	—N/a	6 st 7 lb (41.3 kg)	Robert Howie	Robert Howie		
SCR	Silver King	3y c	—N/a	7 st 0 lb (44.5 kg)	James Wilson	William Branch		

== Prizemoney ==
First prize £1977, second prize £300, third prize £200.

== See also ==
- Melbourne Cup
- List of Melbourne Cup winners
- Victoria Racing Club
