= Kirkham, New South Wales =

Kirkham
- Suburb
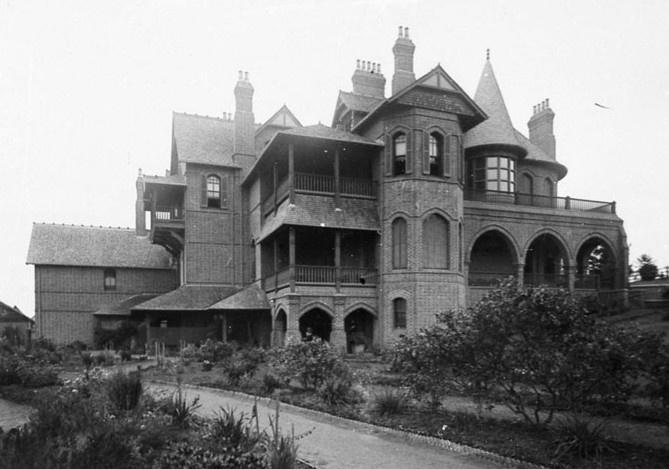
- Camelot, Kirkham (circa 1900)

- Interactive map of Kirkham
- Country: Australia
- State: New South Wales
- City: Sydney
- LGA: Camden Council
- Location: 64 km (40 mi) from Sydney CBD

Government
  - State electorate: Camden
  - Federal division: Hume
- Elevation: 79 m (259 ft)

Population
  - Total: 690 (2021 census)
- Postcode: 2570
Suburbs around Kirkham
Cobbitty	Cobbitty	Harrington Park
Cobbitty	Kirkham	Narellan
Camden	Camden	Elderslie

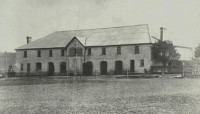
The stables of John Oxley's Kirkham property

Kirkham is a suburb of the Macarthur Region of Sydney in the state of New South Wales, Australia in Camden Council. The suburb is largely undeveloped at present and possibly will remain so since much of it is on low-lying flood-prone land.

== History ==
The area now known as Kirkham was originally home to the Muringong, southernmost of the Darug people. In 1805 John Macarthur established his property at Camden where he raised merino sheep. In 1810, explorer John Oxley was granted 600 acres (2.4 km^{2}) nearby, which he named Kirkham.

Kirkham has figured prominently in the 2013 - 2018 TV series A Place to Call Home. The fictional house known as Ash Park is actually a property called Camelot, which is situated on Oxley's old property at Kirkham. Oxley's original home was called Kirkham, after his birthplace in Yorkshire. The stables are all that remain.

Camelot was designed by the Canadian-born architect John Horbury Hunt for James White, New South Wales politician and great-uncle of Patrick White. It was built circa 1888, on the site of Oxley's old Kirkham Mill, and partly on its foundations. It was originally called Kirkham. The name was changed to Camelot by a new owner, Frances Faithful-Anderson, in 1900. When she saw the house, she was reminded of lines in Tennyson's poem "The Lady of Shalott", which make a reference to Camelot. The house is heritage-listed at the state and federal level.

== People ==
=== Demographics ===
In the 2021 census, the suburb of Kirkham had a population of 690 people. Like other suburbs in the Camden area, the people are very homogeneous with 83.3% Australian born; the other countries of birth included England 3.5%, Italy 2.0%, New Zealand 1.2%, Malta 1.2% and China 1.2%. The average personal weekly income of $1,009 is higher than the national average ($805) but the average monthly mortgage repayments ($2,800) are much higher than the national average ($1,863).

== Governance ==
Kirkham is part of the south ward of Camden Council represented by Eva Campbell, Paul Farrow and Peter Sidgreaves. Theresa Fedeli is currently the local mayor. The suburb is contained within the federal electorate of Macarthur, represented by former ultra-marathon runner Pat Farmer (Liberal), and the state electorate of Camden, currently held by former mayor Geoff Corrigan (Labor).
