= 1883 Melbourne Cup =

Edition of the Melbourne Cup

- Melbourne Cup
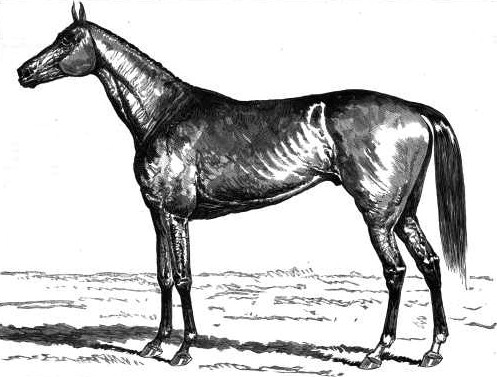
- Image of Martini-Henry
- Location: Flemington Racecourse
- Date: 6 November 1883
- Distance: 2 miles
- Winning horse: Martini-Henry
- Winning time: 3:30.50
- Final odds: 5/1
- Jockey: John Williamson
- Trainer: Michael Fennelly
- Owner: James White
- Surface: Turf
- Attendance: ≈123,000

The 1883 Melbourne Cup was a two-mile handicap horse race which took place on Tuesday, 6 November 1883.

This year was the twenty-third running of the Melbourne Cup. The race was run by 5/1 favourite Martini-Henry who became the first New Zealand bred horse to win the race. The horse was also the first, and to date only Melbourne Cup winner to have a hyphen in its name. Martini-Henry won the race in just its second start, having won the Victoria Derby in its maiden start three days earlier. Martini-Henry would go on to the VRC St Leger in the autumn before breaking down in the Caulfield Cup and being retired to stud.

== Entries and odds ==
The top weighted runner by the handicapper was five-year-old stallion Commotion. It had easily won the Melbourne Stakes on the Saturday before the Melbourne Cup, but wasn't seen as one of the more fancied chances in the race due to the extra distance and handicap. Instead favouritism in the betting ring went to Martini-Henry, Despot, Calma and Claptrap, especially after New Zealand import Sir Modred was withdrawn. The chances of AJC Metropolitan winner The Gem were discounted due to the weight penalty applied for winning that race ahead of First Demon and Aide-de-Camp. Following its win in the Caulfield Cup, Calma odds had shortened to 10/1, while Adelaide Derby winner Dirk Hatteraick was thought to be a good chance over the two-mile distance after not being placed in the Melbourne Stakes behind Commotion. Martini-Henry would emerge as a fairly short-priced favourite following its fast win in the Victoria Derby, while the connections of Claptrap had heavily backed their horse into 7/1. There was some controversy in the lead up to the race when it was accused that Huxley, the jockey who rode Archie in the Victoria Derby, did not ride the horse to win. After a hearing by the Victoria Racing Club stewards, Huxley was given a warning for his error in his ride where he pulled the horse to the back of the field during the race.

== The race ==
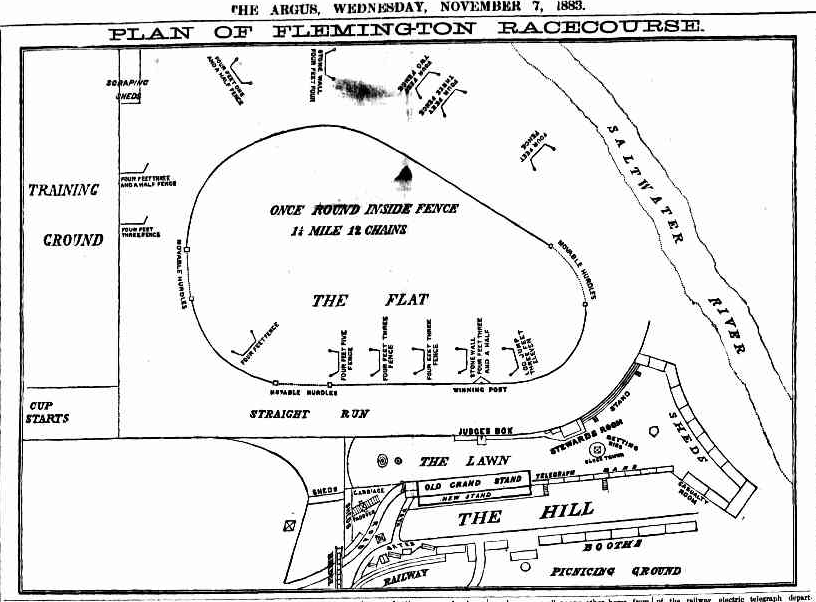
Map of Flemington Racecourse in 1883

From the initial acceptances of 150 runners, there were 33 horses entered at the start of the day before a number of withdrawals. The day had started warm, but a cool change passed through Melbourne during the afternoon. At the fall of the flag, 29 runners made their way from the start. Claptrap was the early leader, taking a lead of a length ahead of Archie at the first turn. Despot slipped at the turn, but was kept upright by its rider, but did lose several lengths to the field. Calma also slipped at the same turn. Down the riverside, Linda went to the lead, taking over from Claptrap and Archie. By the one mile marker, Archie had taken first position to lead by a length. Walker was ridden forward to join Archie, but had run its race in that effort. Archie started to drop back as the field headed for the straight, leaving Linda to briefly lead before Commotion and Claptrap took over the running. At the final turn, Trahan challenged Claptrap and took a lead of a length in front of First Demon, First Water and Martini-Henry who was coming fast. Down the straight, Claptrap was the first to fall away, while Commotion looked to be struggling under the weight. In the final stages, Martini-Henry hit the front with a rush and won easily by more than a length. First Water finished strongly to beat home Commotion. Martini-Henry's time of 3:30.5 was the fastest time ever to win the Melbourne Cup, beating the time of Darriwell to win the 1879 race. Commotion was lauded in the press for finishing as high as third despite the heavy weight afforded under the handicap rules.

Bred by the Auckland Stud Company, Martin-Henry was brought to Australia after being purchased as a yearling for £1,250 by colonial New South Wales politician, the pastoralist James White. He had previously won the Melbourne Cup with Chester in 1877. It was the third time a horse had won the Victoria Derby and Melbourne Cup in the same week, with 1864 winner Lantern winning the Derby after winning the Cup. It was the twelfth time a NSW-owned runner took home the Melbourne Cup. Jockey John Williamson had never ridden a horse that had finished in the top three places in previous Melbourne Cups.

The VRC estimated that over 123,000 people attended the racecourse, with the grandstands and additional work since the previous year's race deemed "altogether too small."

== Full results ==
This is the list of placegetters for the 1883 Melbourne Cup.

| Place | Horse | Age Gender | Jockey | Weight | Trainer | Owner | Odds | Margin |
|---|---|---|---|---|---|---|---|---|
| 1 | Martini-Henry (NZL) | 3y c | John Williamson (Note: Also known at Jack Williamson) | 7 st 5 lb (46.7 kg) | Michael Fennelly | James White | 5/1 fav. | 1½ lengths |
| 2 | First Water | 7y h | Teddy McGrade | 8 st 0 lb (50.8 kg) | C.L. McDonald | Mr T. Barnfield | 25/1 | Head |
| 3 | Commotion | 5y h | Trahan | 10 st 1 lb (64.0 kg) | Joe Morrison | William Pearson | 20/1 | Head |
| 4 | First Demon (late The Demon) | 3y c | Donald Nicholson | 6 st 12 lb (43.5 kg) | D. Lawson | Mr J. Mondy | 10/1 | |
| 5 | Sardius (late Emerald) | 3y c | Charles Hutchins | 6 st 13 lb (44.0 kg) (Note: Was supposed to carry 6st 11lb) | H. Tothill | Mr H. Aldridge | 14/1 | |
| 6 | Aide-de-Camp | 4y h | J. Gainsford | 7 st 5 lb (46.7 kg) | Etienne de Mestre | Mr H. Bowler | 12/1 | |
| 7 | Recovery | 5y h | Kelso | 7 st 2 lb (45.4 kg) | J. Moore | Mr T. Sampson | 50/1 | |
| 8 | Dukedom | 4y h | Moore | 7 st 0 lb (44.5 kg) | James Wilson | William Branch | 50/1 | |
| 9 | Claptrap | 4y h | Sam Cracknell | 7 st 3 lb (45.8 kg) | J.R. Crook | John Whittingham | 7/1 | |
| 10 | Archie | 3y c | Jim Gough | 8 st 3 lb (52.2 kg) | W. Baines | Arthur F. Smart | 33/1 | |
| 11 | Calma | 4y h | Mick O'Brien | 8 st 7 lb (54.0 kg) | P. Heywood | Donald Smith Wallace | 10/1 | |
| 12 | Despot | 4y h | Bob Ellis | 7 st 0 lb (44.5 kg) | Michael Fennelly | James White | 6/1 | |
| 13 | Magnet | 4y h | Power | 8 st 0 lb (50.8 kg) | Francis F. Dakin | William Pearson | 50/1 | |
| —N/a | Sweet William | 5y h | William Yeomans | 9 st 5 lb (59.4 kg) | Harry Raynor | William Gannon | 33/1 | |
| —N/a | The Gem | 5y h | W. Huxley | 9 st 4 lb (59.0 kg) | J. Moore | John Mayo | 100/1 | |
| —N/a | Stockwell | 5y h | J. Geoghegan | 8 st 13 lb (56.7 kg) | Robert Howie | Mr W. Bailey | 33/1 | |
| —N/a | Cunnamulla | 5y h | Brickwood Colley | 8 st 1 lb (51.3 kg) | Tom Brown | Mr W.R. Hall | 50/1 | |
| —N/a | Nicholas | 4y h | Tom Hales | 8 st 0 lb (50.8 kg) | Etienne de Mestre | Etienne de Mestre | 14/1 | |
| —N/a | Pollio | 7y h | Burton | 7 st 12 lb (49.9 kg) | T. Jones | Mr E. Weeks | 33/1 | |
| —N/a | Dirk Hatteraick | 3y c | Boase | 7 st 10 lb (49.0 kg) | J.H. Hill | Mr S. Barnard | 16/1 | |
| —N/a | Angelsey | 4y h | Alec Robertson | 7 st 10 lb (49.0 kg) | W.H. Prestwich | Mr S.G. Cook | 50/1 | |
| —N/a | Kingsdale | 3y C | Strickland | 7 st 8 lb (48.1 kg) | Tom Lamond | Mr J. Stewart | 100/1 | |
| —N/a | Santa Claus | 5y h | Walker | 7 st 5 lb (46.7 kg) | Francis F. Dakin | Mr H. James | 50/1 | |
| —N/a | Koh-i-Nor | 5y h | Thornton | 7 st 0 lb (44.5 kg) | G. Read | Mr H.T. Hart | 50/1 | |
| —N/a | Lesbia | 4y m | English | 6 st 12 lb (43.5 kg) | S. Mahon | Mr S. McMahon | 50/1 | |
| —N/a | Linda | 5y m | Fallon | 6 st 10 lb (42.6 kg) | James Wilson | James Wilson | 50/1 | |
| —N/a | Kathleen Mavoureen | 6y m | Barr | 6 st 9 lb (42.2 kg) | T. Coffey | Mr J. McKenzie | 50/1 | |
| —N/a | Le Grand (Note: Sometimes spelled Legrand) | 3y c | T. Nerriker | 7 st 5 lb (46.7 kg) | Joe Monaghan | Donald Smith Wallace | 25/1 | |
| Last | Bis Bis | 3y f | F. Hutchins | 6 st 8 lb (41.7 kg) | H. Tothill | Mr W. Gordon | 50/1 | |
| SCR | Sir Modred (NZL) | 6y h | —N/a | 9 st 8 lb (60.8 kg) | Allsopp | Mr D. Proudfoot | | |
| SCR | Off Colour | 3y c | —N/a | 7 st 12 lb (49.9 kg) | James Wilson | William Branch | | |
| SCR | Jessie | 4y m | —N/a | 7 st 9 lb (48.5 kg) | Thomas Ivory | Thomas Ivory | | |
| SCR | Signor | 3y c | —N/a | 7 st 1 lb (44.9 kg) | W. Doyle | Mr E.P. Wilson | | |
| SCR | Bordeaux | Aged h | —N/a | 6 st 9 lb (42.2 kg) | H. Yeend | William Clarke | | |

== Prizemoney ==
For the 1883 race, the Victoria Racing Club increased the prize money awarded, adding £1000 to the winner's sweepstakes, while also increasing the second and third prizes each by £100.

First prize £2157, second prize £300, third prize £200.

== See also ==
- Melbourne Cup
- List of Melbourne Cup winners
- Victoria Racing Club
