= 1881 Melbourne Cup =

1881 horse race in Melbourne, Victoria

- Melbourne Cup
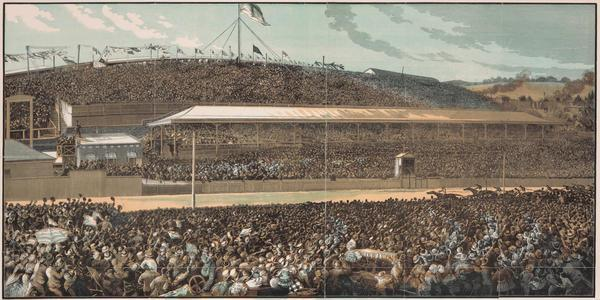
- Engraving of the finish line of the 1881 race
- Location: Flemington Racecourse
- Date: 1 November 1881
- Distance: 2 miles
- Winning horse: Zulu
- Winning time: 3:32.5
- Final odds: 50/1
- Jockey: Jim Gough
- Trainer: Tom Lamond
- Owner: Charles McDonnell
- Surface: Turf
- Attendance: ≈100,000

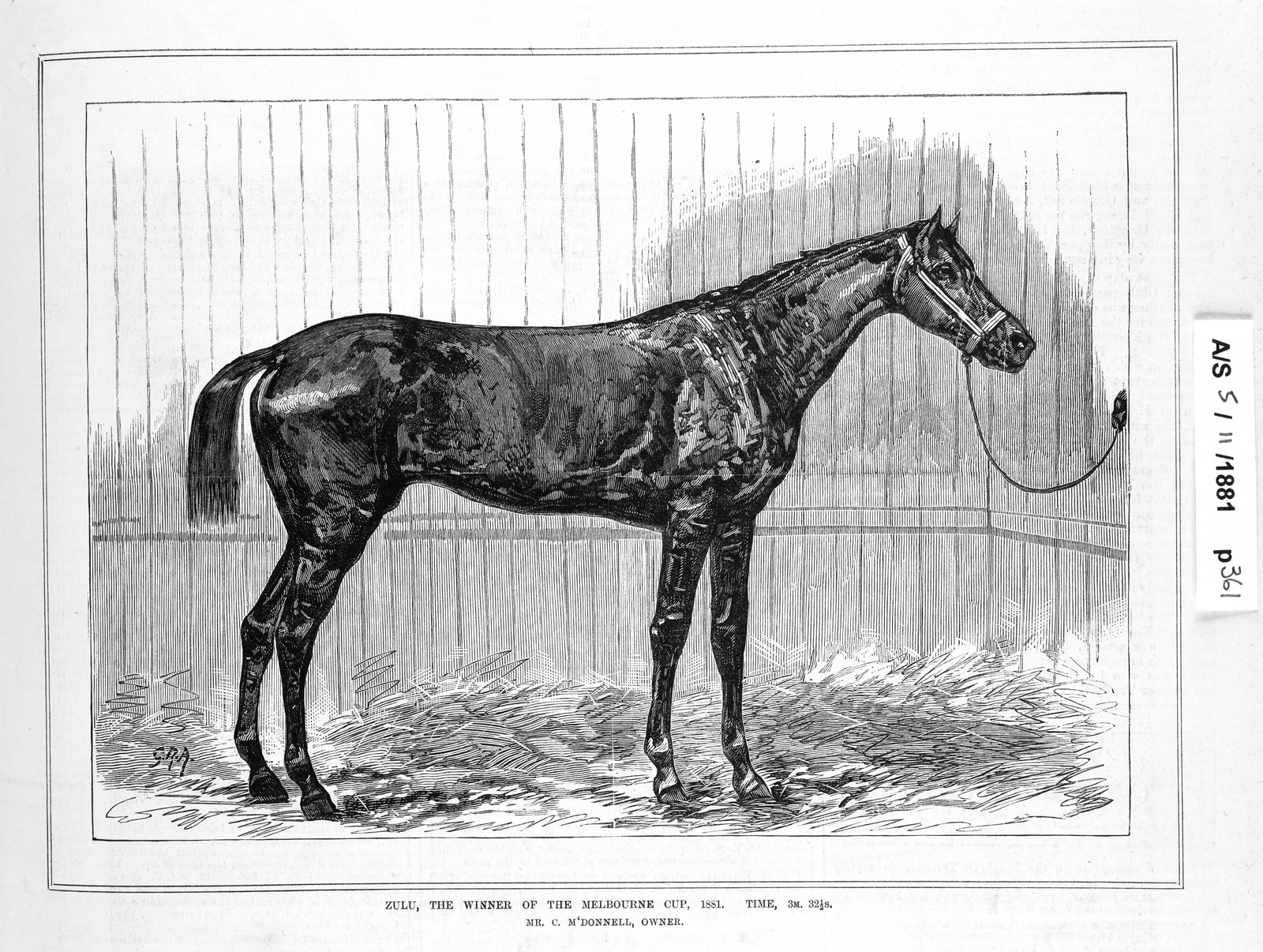
Image of Zulu, published in the Australasian Sketcher.

The 1881 Melbourne Cup was a two-mile handicap horse race which took place on Tuesday, 1 November 1881.

This year was the twenty-first running of the Melbourne Cup. The race was won by 50/1 outsider, four-year-old stallion Zulu, trained by Tom Lamond. (Note: Assertions that Charlie Page was his trainer have been debunked by VRC historian Dr Andrew Lemon.)

== Entries and odds ==
When nominations closed for the race in June, 120 entries had paid the initial fee. Easy winner of the 1881 Victoria Derby, Darebin started as the betting favourite, with a number of competitors in that race either not fancied or withdrawing from the final field for the Melbourne Cup. 1881 AJC Derby winner Wheatear was considered an outside chance in the race, with the horses it defeated in that race, Monmouth and Sardonyx two of the horses withdrawn on race day. Wheatear did win the Melbourne Stakes on the Saturday before the Melbourne Cup, having not been entered into the Victoria Derby. In the paddock before the start, most observers fancied Waxy and Odd Trick, as well as the betting favourite Darebin.

== The race ==
The final field of 33 runners gathered for the start, which was delayed when Coreena bolted and ran for more than a mile before being brought under control. It would be Somnus leading the field early, ahead of Wheatear, Santa Claus and Bathurst. Somnus held the lead at the first turn, before Santa Claus took over near the end of the riverside straight. Paddy Piggott had taken Sweetmeat through the field to challenge for the lead, but before the final turn Zulu had challenged Santa Claus and taken over the running from the front. Waxy challenged Zulu ahead of Darebin, with Darebin's challenge falling short in the final mile, dropping back into the pack much to the cheers of the bookmakers.

Just before the field entered the Flemington straight, Wheatear's chances evaporated owing to a dog running across the course into the path of the large field. Wheatear fell, giving his jockey Emsworth a nasty spill although he was uninjured, while Suwarrow fell over him in the mayhem. The jockey of Suwarrow, 19-year-old John Dodd was severely injured and subsequently died from his injuries. Dodd had been thrown from the saddle and other horses galloped over him while he on the turf.

Trainer of Wheater Tom Lamond might have rued his misfortune, but at the very moment the fall occurred, his other horse the "lame pony" Zulu was successfully defying all attempts to run him down, leading by as much as two lengths. The small black horse hanging on down the straight to win by close to a length ahead of The Czar who had run on near the finish ahead of a fast-finishing Sweetmeat ahead of the pack which included Waxy and Trump Yoss.

Zulu was one of a number of horses brought to Melbourne for the spring by trainer Tom Lamond. With a light weight and at long odds, Zulu's win was a surprise to many, with many bookmakers offering upwards of 100/1. Lamond, who was largely responsible for preparing Archer on behalf of Etienne de Mestre for his two Melbourne Cups, finally had one of his own. Zulu was owned by Taree grazier Charles McDonnell who had sent the horse to be trained by Lamond in 1880.

Zulu's rider, lightweight jockey Jim Gough, was just 14-years-old in his first Melbourne Cup race.

The Melbourne Cup was Zulu's first major race win, having won only the Parramatta Handicap and Birthday Handicap as a three-year-old, also winning the Country Purse at Hawkesbury, and the Squatters Handicap at Randwick earlier in the 1881 spring racing season. Living up to its moniker as a "lame pony", Zulu limped back to the weighing yard to half-hearted cheers from the stands.

== Full results ==
This is the list of placegetters for the 1881 Melbourne Cup.

Place	Horse	Age Gender	Jockey	Weight	Trainer	Owner	Odds	Margin
1	Zulu	4y h	Jim Gough	5 st 10 lb (36.3 kg)	Tom Lamond	Charles McDonnell	50/1	¾ length
2	The Czar	5y h	Trahan	6 st 9 lb (42.2 kg)	Joe Morrison	Joe Morrison	20/1	¾ length
3	Sweetmeat	6y h	Paddy Piggott	9 st 0 lb (57.2 kg)	Thomas Ivory	Thomas Ivory	14/1	
4	Waxy	6y h	Donald Nicholson	6 st 1 lb (38.6 kg)	James Monaghan	Richard Rouse	4/1	
5	Trump Yoss	6y g	Tom Hales	7 st 5 lb (46.7 kg)	Tom Brown	William A. Long	20/1	
6	Creswick	4y h	John Gainsford	6 st 13 lb (44.0 kg)	Harry Rayner	Patrick Brennan	20/1	
7	First Water	5y h	Wyman	8 st 7 lb (54.0 kg)	Tom Jordan	William Pile	20/1	
8	Odd Trick	6y h	Walker	7 st 9 lb (48.5 kg)	Thomas Wilson	William Robert Wilson	7/1	
9	Carmen	4y m	K. Russell	5 st 12 lb (37.2 kg)		Mr H. Herbert	20/1	
10	Greyhound	3y c	Kelby	5 st 9 lb (35.8 kg)	J. Griffin	Mr E.E. Jones	100/1	
11	Santa Claus	3y c	Bowes	5 st 9 lb (35.8 kg)		Mr D. Macpherson	12/1	
12	Darebin	3y c	Power	7 st 0 lb (44.5 kg) (Note: Was supposed to carry 6st 12lb)	Francis F. Dakin	Francis F. Dakin	3/1 fav.	
13	Chatterer	4y h	William Murphy	7 st 0 lb (44.5 kg)	Joe Morrison	John Whittingham	200/1	
—N/a	Wellington	6y h	William Yeomans	8 st 11 lb (55.8 kg)	Joe Morrison	Mr C.G. Baldock	20/1	
—N/a	Savanaka	7y h	Brickwood Colley	8 st 7 lb (54.0 kg)	J. Hill	John Crozier Jr	20/1	
—N/a	Sir Modred (NZL)	4y h	Rawlings	8 st 4 lb (52.6 kg)	H. Goodman	Mr H. Driver	100/1	
—N/a	Lord Burghley	6y h	Francis	7 st 11 lb (49.4 kg)	Thomas Ivory	Thomas Ivory	50/1	
—N/a	Waterloo	4y h	Mick O'Brien	7 st 8 lb (48.1 kg)	P. Heywood	Donald Smith Wallace	20/1	
—N/a	Bathurst (late Telephone)	4y h	Williamson	7 st 7 lb (47.6 kg)	Michael Fennelly	James White	25/1	
—N/a	Canary	4y h	Sullivan	7 st 5 lb (46.7 kg)	Harry Chifney	Mr M. Jacobs	50/1	
—N/a	The Wandering Jew	5y h	Burton	7 st 1 lb (44.9 kg)	Etienne de Mestre	Mr J.K. Maitland	12/1	
—N/a	Pawnbroker	5y h	George Williams	6 st 11 lb (43.1 kg)	H. Tothill	Robert Trivess Moore	50/1	
—N/a	Pollio	5y h	Pearse	6 st 7 lb (41.3 kg)	William Lang	Mr G. Livingstone	20/1	
—N/a	Somnus (NZL)	3y c	Sam Cracknell	6 st 7 lb (41.3 kg)	H. Goodman	Mr H. Driver	25/1	
—N/a	Orient	4y h	Riley	6 st 6 lb (40.8 kg)	Etienne de Mestre	Etienne de Mestre	20/1	
—N/a	Guinea	4y h	Sheehan	6 st 4 lb (39.9 kg)	Etienne de Mestre	Etienne de Mestre	25/1	
—N/a	Duchess	4y m	Young	5 st 9 lb (35.8 kg) (Note: Was supposed to carry 5st 7lb)	James Wilson	Messrs. Skene Bros	10/1	
—N/a	Coreena	3y f	Ricketson	5 st 10 lb (36.3 kg)		Mr H. Burrell	100/1	
—N/a	Bandalbion	4y h	Connors	6 st 10 lb (42.6 kg)		Dan Melhado	100/1	
—N/a	The Cockney	3y c	Barr	5 st 7 lb (34.9 kg)		Mr T. Coker	100/1	
Last	Oxalia	Aged m	Phillips	5 st 10 lb (36.3 kg) (Note: Was supposed to carry 5st 7lb)		Mr R. Alexander	12/1	
Fell	Suwarrow	5y h	John Dodd	8 st 3 lb (52.2 kg)	Robert Howie	Robert Howie	50/1	
Fell	Wheatear	3y c	Emsworth	6 st 12 lb (43.5 kg)	Tom Lamond	Frank Osborne	25/1	
SCR	Respite	4y h	—N/a	7 st 7 lb (47.6 kg)	—N/a	Mr A. Davies		
SCR	Warlock	6y h	—N/a	7 st 6 lb (47.2 kg)	A. Selman	Mr J. Paterson		
SCR	Monmouth	3y c	—N/a	6 st 13 lb (44.0 kg)	—N/a	James White		
SCR	Sir Peter	5y h	—N/a	6 st 9 lb (42.2 kg)	Thomas Wilson	Martin Loughlin		
SCR	Spectre	3y c	—N/a	5 st 8 lb (35.4 kg)	Tom Jordan	William Pile		
SCR	Somerset	3y c	—N/a	6 st 10 lb (42.6 kg)	James Wilson	Mr E. Lee		
SCR	Royal Maid	3y f	—N/a	6 st 8 lb (41.7 kg)	James Wilson	William Branch		
SCR	Sardonyx	3y c	—N/a	5 st 7 lb (34.9 kg)	James Monaghan	Fitzwilliam Wentworth		
SCR	Primrose	3y f	—N/a	5 st 7 lb (34.9 kg)	—N/a	Thomas Chirnside		
SCR	Sangfroid	3y c	—N/a	5 st 13 lb (37.6 kg)	Tom Brown	William A. Long		
SCR	Spinningdale	3y f	—N/a	6 st 9 lb (42.2 kg)	Tom Lamond	Thomas Chirnside		
SCR	Wizard	4y g	—N/a	5 st 13 lb (37.6 kg)	A. Selman	Mr J. Paterson		

== Prizemoney ==
First prize £1805, second prize £200, third prize £100.

== See also ==
- Melbourne Cup
- List of Melbourne Cup winners
- Victoria Racing Club
