= 1891 Melbourne Cup =

Annual horse race in Victoria, Australia

- Melbourne Cup
- Location: Flemington Racecourse
- Date: 3 November 1891
- Distance: 2 miles
- Winning horse: Malvolio
- Winning time: 3:29.25
- Final odds: 16/1
- Jockey: George Redfearn
- Trainer: James Redfearn
- Owner: James Redfearn
- Surface: Turf
- Attendance: 80,000

The 1891 Melbourne Cup was a two-mile handicap horse race which took place on Tuesday, 3 November 1891.

This year was the thirty-first running of the Melbourne Cup.

This is the list of placegetters for the 1891 Melbourne Cup.

Place	Name	Jockey	Trainer	Owner
1	Malvolio	George Redfearn	James Redfearn	James Redfearn
2	Sir William	J Fielder		
3	Strathmore	H Cusdin		

== See also ==
- Melbourne Cup
- List of Melbourne Cup winners
- Victoria Racing Club
