= John Dodd (jockey) =

Australian jockey

John Dodd (1863–1881) was an Australian jockey who died following an accident during the 1881 Melbourne Cup.

== Early life ==
John Dodd was born in 1863 at Avoca, Victoria, Australia. His father was Aaron Dodd, a native of Leicestershire, England, who was convicted of burglary and transported for life to Van Diemens Land in 1828. In 1840 Aaron married Mary Jane White. Some time after he gained his conditional pardon in 1846, they emigrated to Victoria, settling in Avoca around 1850. John was the 13th of possibly 15 children. John Dodd was apprenticed as a jockey to Robert Howie, a Ballarat horse trainer.

== Melbourne Cup, 1881 ==
During the running of the race a dog ran onto the race track causing one of the horses, Wheatear, to fall. Shortly after that Dodd's horse, Suwarrow, was forced into the rails. Dodd suffered a broken leg and internal injuries. He died two weeks later (14 November 1881) in the Melbourne Hospital. His death was widely reported in local and international newspapers at the time. An inquest on his body found that he died of complications from a compound fracture caused when his leg was twisted between the rail and the post. The coroner recommended paling the fence to avoid similar accidents in the future.

The Avoca Mail set up a fund in support of his 'aged mother and helpless sister' to which the Victoria Racing Club contributed 50 pounds from the Jockeys Fund. A cricket match was organised between amateur and professional jockeys at the Melbourne Cricket Ground on 6 January 1882 which raised about 200 pounds for the fund.

== The legend of George Dodd ==
Many sources report that the jockey who died in the 1881 Melbourne Cup was George Dodd and that he was one of Australia's most famous jockeys at the time. The Australian Jockeys Association memorial at Caulfield Racecourse records a G. Dodd but no J. Dodd. This story dates back at least to a 1949 article by "The Storyteller" in a Victorian regional newspaper which adds that Dodd bred Dalmatian dogs, one of which ran away a week before the race. Dodd saw this as an omen and, according to "The Storyteller", the dog that ran onto the racetrack was Dodd's missing dog. The final part of the legend is that Dodd was riding Wheatear, and died on the track, killed by his own faithful dog. Wannan and others point out that Dodd was in fact riding Suwarrow and that this accident was unrelated to the one caused by the dog. However they maintain the fiction of his first name.
