= Fisherman (English horse) =

British-bred Thoroughbred racehorse

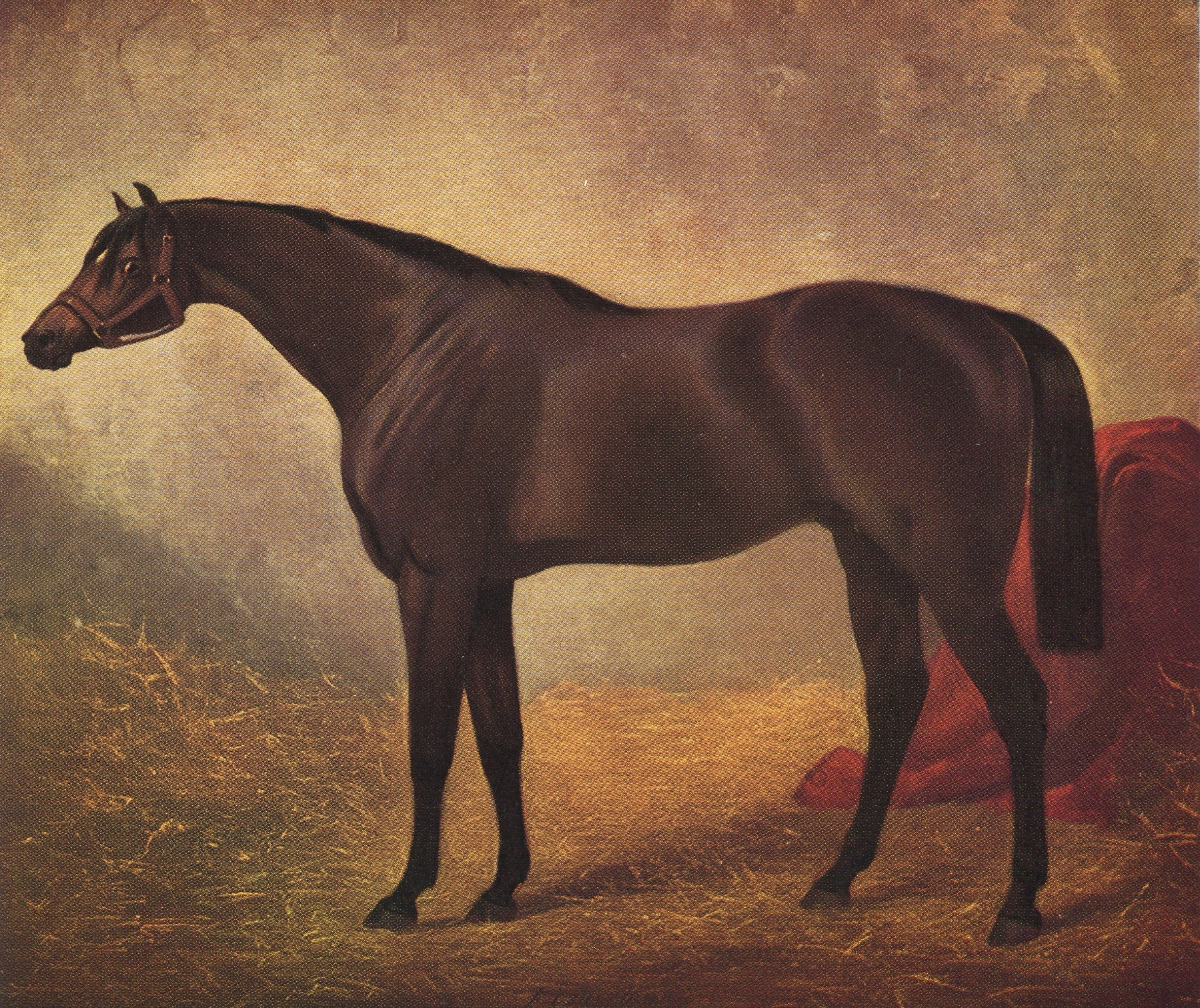
- From a painting by John Frederick Herring, Sr.
- Sire: Heron
- Grandsire: Bustard
- Dam: Mainbrace
- Damsire: Sheet Anchor
- Sex: Stallion
- Foaled: 1853
- Country: England
- Colour: Brown
- Breeder: Mr Fowler
- Owner: Hurtle Fisher
- Record: 121 (or 136) starts, 70 wins

Major wins
- 1858 & 1859 Ascot Gold Cup
- Last updated on 29 May 2010

Fisherman was a hardy English-bred Thoroughbred racehorse who won 70 races including the Ascot Gold Cup on two occasions. Exported into Australia he became a leading sire there.

== Breeding ==
He was a brown stallion bred by Mr. Fowler in 1853 in England. Fisherman was by Heron (son of Bustard), his dam Mainbrace, was by Sheet Anchor from a Bay Middleton mare from the Bruce Lowe number 11 family. He was inbred to Orville in the third and fifth generations of his pedigree (3m x 5f). Fisherman was a half-brother to Mainstay and The Peer.

== Racing record ==
Fisherman was the best stayer of his time and the winner of 70 races, including 21 wins from 35 starts in one season. After winning the Ascot Gold Cup on one occasion Fisherman was saddled for the following race, the Queen’s Plate contested over three miles, and won that race, too. Altogether he won 26 Queen’s Plate trophies and two Ascot Gold Cups.

== Stud record ==
Hurtle Fisher purchased Fisherman for 3,000 guineas and imported him to South Australia in November 1860. He later stood at Fisher’s renowned Maribyrnong Stud in Victoria. Fisherman was regarded as one of the best English stayers imported to Australia during the nineteenth century.

In Australia he was a great sire where his offspring included 10 Australian stakes-winners that had 27 stakes-wins, including:

- Angler (VRC St Leger Stakes, Victoria Derby; sire),
- Cowra (Adelaide Cup twice),
- Fanny Fisher (dam of Kingfisher, won Auckland Cup),
- Fenella (VRC All-Aged Stakes, VRC Ascot Vale (2yo) Stakes, AJC Champagne Stakes)
- Fishhook (Launceston Cup, VRC St Leger Stakes, AJC Australian St Leger, Sydney Cup, AJC Champagne Stakes etc.)
- Gasworks (VRC St Leger Stakes, Australian Cup)
- Kingfisher (ex Grisi), Kingfisher (ex Melesina),
- Lady Heron (VRC Ascot Vale (2yo) Stakes, VRC Oaks)
- Maribyrnong (sire),
- My Dream (Victoria Derby VRC Oaks),
- Seagull (Victoria Derby, VRC Oaks etc.)
- Sour Grapes (VRC All-Aged Stakes, VRC Ascot Vale (2yo) Stakes),
- Sylvia (VRC Oaks Stakes; dam of Goldsbrough, Martini-Henry and Robin Hood).

Fisherman stood only five seasons at stud before he died in June 1865 at the Maribyrnong Stud.

John Frederick Herring, Sr. painted the above portrait of Fisherman prior to his export.

== See also ==
- List of leading Thoroughbred racehorses
- Thoroughbred racing in Australia
