= Tom Hales (jockey) =

Australian jockey

Thomas Hales (c. 1847 – 27 October 1901) was an Australian jockey who has been called the Fred Archer of the Australian turf. During his 20-year career he rode nearly 500 winners, including every major South Australian and Victorian race with the exception of the Caulfield Cup.

== History ==
Hales was born in Portland, Victoria, a son of Matthew Hales (c. 1819 – 21 July 1884) and Margaret Hales née Ward (c. 1824 – 29 September 1897). The family moved to Penola, South Australia when Tom was quite young, then to nearby Robe, where he grew up.

Hales' first serious, though unofficial, race was circa 1860, on Euclid, a chestnut gelding, against Tommy, a bay gelding trained and ridden by Johnny Powning ( –1862). Hales weighed just 4 stone (25 kg). He first came to public attention on 30 December 1864 when he won a £100 Produce Stakes between four progeny of Fisherman, on Smuggler, a bay colt owned by C. B. Fisher. For several years he divided his time between Adelaide and the South-east of South Australia, riding in both hurdles and flat races.

He first rode in Victoria in 1872 with the stable of T. J. Ryan (c. 1850–1875), making second place in the Melbourne Cup on The Ace. The following year, Ryan left Australia for England, and died a year or so later. Hales won the Adelaide Cup in 1874 on Ace of Trumps for William Gerrard ( –1884) of Rapid Bay, and in 1877 on Aldinga for Samuel Gardiner ( –1905) of Bundoora Park. His most celebrated victory is probably the Melbourne Cup, which he won on Grand Flaneur for William Long, and some of his favorite horses were Briseis, Pardon and First King, for James "Old Jim" Wilson, (1827–1917) of the St. Alban's Stud in Geelong. From 1883 to 1890 he raced almost exclusively for James White (1828–1890).

Notable trophies he garnered before retiring in 1894 include:

- VRC Derby six times, with Briseis (1877), Grand Flaneur (1881), Trident (1886), Ensign (1888), Dreadnought (1889), and The Admiral (1890)
- VRC Oaks five times, with Briseis (1876), Pardon (1877), Royal Maid (1881), Uralla (1885), and Spice (1889)
- Maribyrnong Plate on Acme (1885)
- VRC St Leger ten times, with Richmond (1876), Bosworth (1879), Grand Flaneur (1881), Navigator (1883), Martini-Henry (1884), Matchlock (1886), Trident (1887), Abercorn (1888), Volley (1889), and Dreadnought (1890)
- Caulfield Guineas three times, with Carlyon (1887), Volley (1888), and Rudolph (1889)
- AJC Derby six times, with Richmond (1875), Grand Flaneur (1880), Navigator (1882), Bargo (1884), Trident (1886), and Abercorn (1887)
- AJC St Leger seven times with Petrea, Navigator, Matchlock, Trident
- AJC Champagne Stakes five times with Navigator (1882), Bargo (1884), Uralla (1885), Volley (1888), and Rudolph (1889)
- SAJC St Leger four times, with Stella (1875), Emulation (1876), Progress (1881), and Topaz (1882)
- Sydney Cup three times, with Savanaka (1879), Petrea (1880),
- Hobart Cup once, with Lord Harry (1889)
- Launceston Cup once
- Geelong Cup six times with Pride of the Hills (1877), Newminster (1878), Guinea (1882), Gudarz (1883), Linda (1884), Malua (1889)
- Australian Cup eight times, with Lurline (1875), Richmond (1878), Savanaka (1879), Navigator (1883), Morpeth (1884), Trident (1887), Carlyon (1888) and Dreadnought (1890)
- VRC Champion Stakes seven times, with Richmond (1876), First King (1878, 1880), Grand Flaneur (1881), Matchlock (1886), Trident (1887), and Abercorn (1888)

He created what may be an Australian record at the V.R.C. Autumn meeting of 1888, when he won eleven races out of fourteen starts, including four consecutive wins on the first day: Carlyon, in the Essendon Stakes; Volley, in the Ascot Vale Stakes; Abercorn, in the St. Leger and Cranbrook in the Newmarket Handicap.

== Later career ==
After retiring from the saddle, Hales turned his attention to breeding at his "Haleswood Stud", on portion of Henry Bowler's estate at Eskdale, Victoria on the Mitta Mitta River. His success as a jockey did not however transfer to the stud, and apart from a Newmarket Handicap win by Carlton in 1897, he had little luck. On the advice of a veterinarian, he relinquished the stallion Lochiel, which later proved one of the most successful sires in the country.

Hales died rather suddenly at home. He had suffered asthma all his life, and died of "congestion of the lungs" (possibly pulmonary edema) following a severe cold. His remains were buried in the Roman Catholic section of the Boroondara Cemetery, Kew.

== Bibliography ==
- Henry, J. S. F (1901), The racing career of Tom Hales, Australia's premier horseman, s.n. also available online

== Recognition and a tribute ==
He has been named one of Australia's "Best 10 jockeys of all time".

Thomas Hales Place, Gordon, Canberra, was named for him.

"... the only jockey I ever saw who never lost a race after he had once had it won." ... Joe "Leviathan" Thompson, leading Melbourne bookmaker

== Personal ==
Hales had a long friendship with fellow-horseman and noted poet Adam Lindsay Gordon, which began when Gordon, then a mounted policeman, upbraided young Tommy and friends, who were throwing stones either at a signboard or cattle

Tom Hales (1847 – 26 October 1901) married Harriet Amelia Blackler (1860 – 10 February 1897) on 24 August 1887. She was a daughter of William Blackler, a noted horse trainer and breeder. He married again, to Frances Selina Coles (c. 1864 – 4 May 1932) on 25 April 1898.

They had a home "Acmeville" on Park Street, Moonee Ponds. There were no children.
