= Camelot, Kirkham =

Camelot
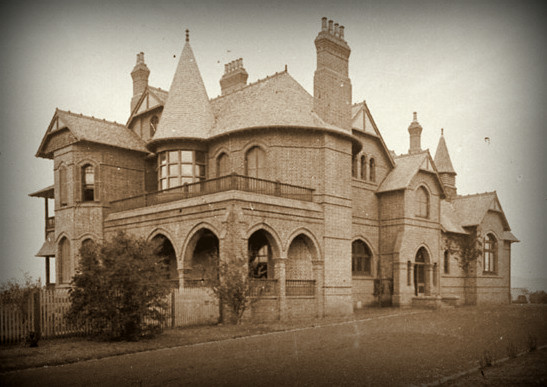
- Camelot, c. 1900.

- Location within Sydney
- Alternative names: Kirkham

General information
- Status: Completed
- Type: Mansion
- Architectural style: Late Victorian
- Location: Kirkham Lane, Narellan, New South Wales, Australia
- Coordinates: 34°02′15″S 150°42′25″E
- Named for: Camelot
- Construction started: 1881
- Completed: 1888
- Client: James White

Design and construction
- Architect: John Horbury Hunt

Register of the National Estate
- Official name: Camelot, Camelot Gardeners Lodge, Camelot Stables
- Type: Historic
- Designated: 21 March 1978
- Reference no.: 3236, 3237, 3238

New South Wales Heritage Register
- Official name: Camelot; Kirkham
- Type: State heritage (complex / group)
- Criteria: a., b., c.
- Designated: 2 April 1999
- Reference no.: 385
- Type: Mansion
- Category: Residential buildings (private)

Camelot is a heritage-listed former residence, race horse stud and homestead and now large home located at Kirkham Lane in the outer south-western Sydney suburb of Narellan, New South Wales, Australia. It was designed by John Horbury Hunt and built from 1881 to 1888. It is also known as Camelot and Kirkham. It was added to the New South Wales State Heritage Register on 2 April 1999.

Camelot was completed in 1888 in the Late Victorian style and has been used as a television and film location.

== History ==
This area was originally home to the Muringong, southernmost of the Darug people. In 1805 John Macarthur established his property at Camden where he farmed merino sheep. In 1810, explorer John Oxley was granted 240 hectares (600 acres) nearby, which he named Kirkham, after his birthplace in Yorkshire. Oxley had a homestead and stables built in 1816 (today this is in separate ownership, across Kirkham Lane) and, probably sometime later, a Mill. Oxley died in 1828 in straitened economic circumstances, his widow and children were granted 2,023 hectares (5,000 acres) by the Executive Council, although she was refused a pension. The house was demolished in 1882; the heritage-listed stables, which date from 1816, are all that remain.

The existing Camelot was designed by the Canadian-born architect John Horbury Hunt for James White, New South Wales politician and great-uncle of Patrick White. It was completed in 1888 on the site of Oxley's old Kirkham Mill, and partly on its foundations. Folklore has it that the house was financed by the winnings from one of James White's horses, called Chester, which won the 1877 Melbourne Cup.

James White bought the property in the mid 1870s and it became his primary race horse-stud. White was a highly successful breeder, his horses won five A.J.C. Derbys, five A.J.C. Sires' Produce Stakes, five V.R.C. St Legers and six V.R.C. Derbys between 1877 and 1890. The attention paid to the design and construction of the stables by White and Hunt reflects the important part horse racing played in the White family. His wife, Emily Elizabeth, whom he married in 1856, shared his passion for racing. Prior to moving to Kirkham, as it was then known, White was educated at the King's School, Parramatta. On his father's death, James managed Edinglassie, Timor and Boorooma. In 1848 James leased Belltrees, in partnership with brothers Francis and George. Management of the property was so successful that they purchased Belltrees in 1853. The partnership continued to buy properties in the Upper Hunter region. In around 1860 James White bought Martindale, near Muswellbrook, where he lived for a number of years. By 1864 he was a magistrate and in December of the same year was elected to the Legislative Assembly for the Upper Hunter. His main political interests were railway expansion, taxes on luxuries and an interest in free selection. In 1868 White resigned from parliament to tour England and the United States. While he was away his brothers, on behalf of the partnership, continued to buy properties. On his return he ran for the seat of Upper Hunter again, but was defeated.

His first association with architect John Horbury Hunt was in about 1873 when Horbury Hunt carried out large scale extensions to newly purchased Cranbrook, Rose Bay. In the following year James White entered the Legislative Council and took on a range of committee positions, including the Royal Society and was a founding member of the natural history Linnean Society of NSW, the Agricultural Society of NSW, the Horticultural Society of NSW, the Union Club, the Animals' Protection Society of NSW, the Warrigal Club and a director/chairman of the Mercantile Bank of Sydney. In light of his passion for racing, he was a long-time member of the Australian Jockey Club and became chairman in 1880 and then again between 1883 and 1890. White must have been impressed by Hunt's extensions to Cranbrook as he engaged Hunt in 1888 to build him a "rural seat" at Kirkham. Allegedly, the finances for Kirkham came from the prize money of one of White's most successful horses, Chester. In early 1890 White began selling his race horses and retiring from committees. He died at Cranbrook on 13 July 1890, perhaps never having lived in Hunt's creation at Kirkham. The property was left to his wife, who sold it about ten years later to the Faithfull Anderson family. Their interest may have been the success White had achieved with his horse stud, given they also had interests in horse racing.

In c. 1900 Faithfull-Anderson family bought the property. It was originally called Kirkham, but the name was changed to Camelot by a new owner, Frances Faithful-Anderson, wife of William Anderson, who bought the house in the 1890s. When she saw the house, she was reminded of lines in Tennyson's poem The Lady of Shalott, which make a reference to Camelot. The youngest daughter of William Pitt Faithfull, Mrs. Frances Lillian, lived there for much of her life and died there in 1948. Before the Great Depression Mrs. Faithfull Anderson frequently hosted large parties, but her inability to keep a large staff during the Depression saw the end of these gatherings. She was remembered for the energy, enthusiasm and generosity she brought to the large number of local causes she was involved in, including the Camden Branch of the Red Cross, the Women's Voluntary Services and the Country Women's Association. In the lead-up to World War II Mrs. Faithfull Anderson realised that aircraft would be needed to adequately defend Australia. With this purpose in mind, she offered the Government a donation to buy several aircraft and, as a result, a training facility was established nearby.

The mansion was bought in 1999 by the current owners, Camden businessman, Brendan Powers and his wife, Rachel.

Camelot was used extensively as a location in the 2013 - 2018 television series A Place to Call Home, in which it was known as Ash Park. It was also used in the 2008 Baz Luhrmann film Australia.

== Description ==
=== Garden ===
A large late 19th century garden with early 20th century alterations surrounding an important country house designed by the architect Horbury Hunt.

The garden, consisting of shrubberies, flower garden, drive and vegetable gardens is enclosed within a large olive hedged rectangle. A subtly curving drive leads from the entrance gates (originally from Yaralla, Concord, re-erected at Camelot) along the northern boundary of the garden along the northern front of the house where it widens into a forecourt, then continues to the stables at the south-west corner.

The eastern, garden front, of the house overlooks a gently sloping lawn and terra-cotta edged flower and rose beds, separated from the drive by a hedge and picket fence. Beyond this garden, to the east, are the remains of further lawns and shrubberies (the "Duck Pond" and 'the Pleasance') now completely overgrown. Beyond the house are the remains of the orchard and vegetable gardens.

=== Building complex ===
- Stables 1816 (Oxley)
- Cottage 1881 (Horbury Hunt for James White) Race Horse breeder (plus Kirkham stables to north)
- c. 1881 Stables & Smoke House (brick domed structure) (Horbury Hunt for White)
- c. 1881 Cottage (Horbury Hunt, 2 storey)
- c. 1888 House/Mansion (Horbury Hunt for White)
- c. 1900 Faithfull-Anderson family bought the property.

Camelot was the last of the "red brick" buildings by John Horbury Hunt, who favoured brick as a building material. The main building is distinguished by a large number of bay windows, chimneys, kitchen stacks, balconies, gables, turrets and stepped wings. It is complemented by a beehive-shaped smoke house, an octagonal aviary that started life as a hen's house, and the largest stables ever designed by the architect. There is also a gardener's lodge that is considered a notable building in its own right. The house is set off by an extensive Victorian-style garden and has been described as "a monument to the skill of its creator." Camelot is a complex consisting of a cottage, "rural seat", stables and a smoke house. The stables are a remnant related to the earlier homestead built by Surveyor-General John Oxley. The homestead itself has been demolished.

After James White purchased the property a two-storey brick cottage, attributed to John Horbury Hunt, was constructed by 1881. The cottage consists of two bedrooms, over three rooms on the ground floor. A two-storey kitchen block, with verandah, was added later.

In 1888 White employed Hunt to design him a "rural seat". Reynolds and Hughes describe it as a "highly individual two-storey house facing north-east". It was constructed on the site of the old Oxley Mill, reusing stone in the basement kitchen and service areas. The roof line is exceedingly complex, with numerous shapes and gables, "including a faceted wing, a curved Hipped bay and a collection of tall chimney stacks". This collection is augmented by multiple chimneys, including an industrial sized kitchen stack unique to Camelot. A smaller coned tower was added by the Faithfull Anderson family after they purchased the property in 1900.

Internally, a small vestibule opens into a large entrance hall, leading to the dining room and faceted drawing room - both with verandahs. Opposite, the morning room features a faceted bay, again unique to Hunt's other designs. The rear of the ground floor is single storey, with a lantern roof, under which is the ballroom, complete with musicians' alcove. Another usual feature of Camelot is the main staircase. The landing projects beyond the external wall and forms the base of a semicircular tower, terminating in a candle-snuffer roof, complete with finial.

New stables were also constructed, located between Camelot and the cottage. These are the largest designed by Hunt. The stables feature a "majestic church-like roof" and a timber planked floor, to allow for more efficient cleaning. The beehive smokehouse located nearby was probably Hunts work also.

=== Condition ===
As at 21 January 2015, apart from the lawns and flower beds directly around the house and drive, the garden is extremely overgrown and almost impossible to plot.

=== Modifications and dates ===
- Stables 1816 (Oxley)
- Cottage 1881 (Horbury Hunt for James White) Race Horse breeder (plus Kirkham stables to north)
- c. 1881 Stables & Smoke House (brick domed structure) (Horbury Hunt for White)
- c. 1888 House/Mansion (Horbury Hunt for White)
- c. 1900 Faithfull-Anderson family buy property.
- The Servants' Quarters have been recently restored and had their joinery repaired and reinstated.

== Heritage listing ==
As at 22 June 2016, Camelot is one of the finest country houses with associated buildings designed by architect John Horbury Hunt, remaining in excellent condition and virtually unaltered. It is surrounded by a large late 19th century garden with early 20th century alterations. The landscape value of its mature planting, the completeness of its layout and the association with one of the most exceptional late 19th century houses in Australia is also significant.

Camelot (Kirkham) was listed on the New South Wales State Heritage Register on 2 April 1999 having satisfied the following criteria.

The place is important in demonstrating the course, or pattern, of cultural or natural history in New South Wales.

Camelot is of State significance through its association with race horse breeding. James White used Camelot as his primary stud and raised several Derby winners, including Nordenfeldt, Trident, Ensign, Dreadnought and Singapore. White built his stud on colts sired by Martini Henry, breed in New Zealand and Chester from E.K. Cox.

White did much to advance horse racing in Australia, the culmination of this being his election as chairman of the Australian Jockey Club in 1880 and again between 1883 and 1890. On the track White's horses, between 1877 and 1890, won five A.J.C. Derbys, five A.J.C. Sires' Produce Stakes, five V.R.C. St Legers and six V.R.C. Derbys.

The Anderson Faithfull family also had interests in race horses and may have continued to use Camelot as a stud.

The place has a strong or special association with a person, or group of persons, of importance of cultural or natural history of New South Wales's history.

Camelot is of State significance through its associations with James White. White had substantial influence in New South Wales through his positions in the Legislative Council and the Legislative Assembly, as a magistrate, and as a member of numerous committees, including the Australian Jockey Club. White did much to promote horse racing and was a highly successful breeder.

The place is important in demonstrating aesthetic characteristics and/or a high degree of creative or technical achievement in New South Wales.

Camelot is a distinctive and unusual house, described as a "fairy castle", designed by John Horbury Hunt. It features a complex roof-line of gables and turrets, as well as unique internal elements, including the main staircase. The interior also features stained glass by Lyons, Wells, Cottier & Co. The stables are highly ornate, for their function, and yet were designed along the most practical lines.

The Camelot mansion and associated gardener's lodge, stable, gardens and grounds are also listed on the Camden Council local government list of the NSW State Register; and on 21 March 1978 the Camelot mansion, gardener's lodge and stables were listed on the (now defunct) Register of the National Estate.

== Gallery ==
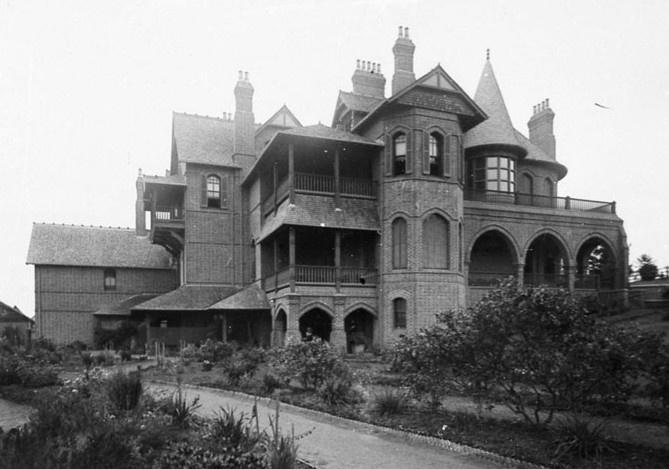
Camelot

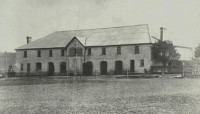
The stables of the original Kirkham property

== See also ==
- Australian residential architectural styles
