= Malua (horse) =

Australian-bred Thoroughbred racehorse

Malua (3)
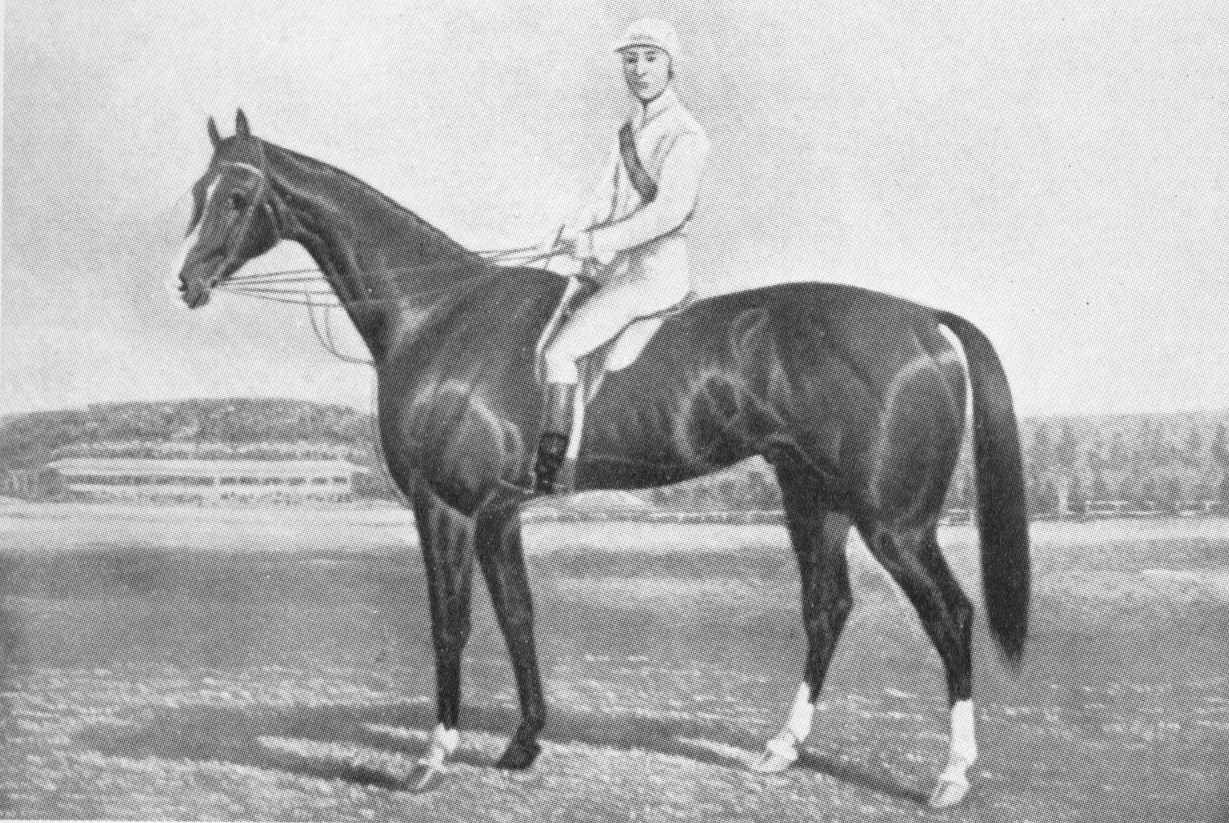
- Sire: St. Albans*
- Grandsire: Blair Athol
- Dam: Edella
- Damsire: Peter Wilkins*
- Sex: Stallion
- Foaled: 1879
- Died: 1896
- Country: Australia
- Colour: Bay
- Breeder: John Field
- Owner: J O Inglis
- Trainer: Isaac Foulsham
- Record: 47: 12-10-3
- Earnings: £7,264

Major wins
- Adelaide Cup (1884); Newmarket Handicap (1884); Melbourne Stakes (1884); Oakleigh Plate (1884); Melbourne Cup (1884); AJC Spring Stakes (1884); VRC Melbourne Stakes (1884); Australian Cup (1886); Geelong Cup (1889); Grand National Hurdle (1889)

Awards
- Australian Racing Hall of Fame (2003)
- Last updated on 7 December 2007

Malua was an Australian thoroughbred racehorse. Malua won over distances ranging from 5 1/2 furlongs to 3 1/4 miles (1,100–5,200 metres).

== Breeding ==
He was a son of St. Albans (GB) from Edella by Peter Wilkins (GB). Malua was bred by John Field of "Calstock" in Deloraine, Tasmania, and as a yearling was sold to Thomas Reibey the former Premier of Tasmania.

== Racing record ==
As a two-year-old the colt raced in Tasmania, where his name was Bagot. He won on three different tracks, but was then sold on the mainland for 500 guineas to J. O. Inglis, who changed the colt's name to Malua.

In 1884, Malua won the Newmarket Handicap (6 furlongs or 1,200 metres) and Oakleigh Plate (6 furlongs or 1,200 metres) carrying 9 st 7 lb (60 kg; 133 lb). Malua's jockey set a precedent when he took him to the outside (grandstand side) rail to win the Newmarket, a tactic not used before. The term "Malua's track" was coined to name that portion of the Flemington Racecourse.

After a trip to Sydney, where he won the Spring Stakes, Malua returned to Melbourne for the 1884 Caulfield Cup, in which he carried 9 st 12 lb (63 kg; 138 lb). He was not placed but finished strongly and convinced his connections to run him in the Melbourne Cup. He won the Melbourne Stakes and became favourite for the big race. Carrying 9 st 9 lb (61 kg; 135 lb), Malua fought out the finish with Commotion (9 st 12 lb) to win by half a length. Two days later he won the six-furlong weight-for-age Flying Stakes on Oaks Day.

Malua had a marvellous constitution and in 1886 carried 9st 9 lb to win the Australian Cup. In 1888 he was switched to jumping, not so unusual in those days and he won the VRC Grand National Hurdle, ridden by his owner, J. O.Inglis. Malua continued racing combining it with his stud career until 1889.

== Stud record ==
Malua sired 9 stakeswinners with 13 collective stakes wins including Malvolio, (1891 Melbourne Cup), Mora (VRC Melbourne Stakes, SAJC Adelaide Cup and VRC October Stakes) and Ingliston (1900 Caulfield Cup).

== Honours ==
Malua was inducted into the Australian Racing Hall of Fame in 2003. In the suburb of Ormond in Melbourne, there is a street named after him (Malua Street). This street for a period of time housed the Dame Nellie Melba. A memorial to Malua was erected and opened in October 2009 in the Deloraine Museum, in the town where he was born.
