= Martini-Henry (horse) =

New Zealand Thoroughbred racehorse

Martini-Henri
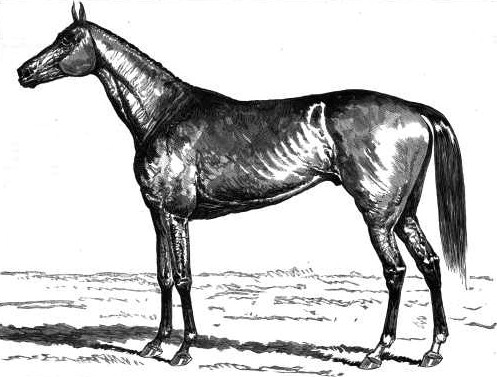
- Image of Martini-Henry (from the Gooreen collection)
- Sire: Musket
- Grandsire: Toxopholite
- Dam: Sylvia
- Damsire: Fisherman
- Sex: Stallion
- Foaled: 1880
- Died: 1903
- Country: New Zealand
- Colour: Bay
- Breeder: Auckland Stud Company
- Owner: Hon. James White
- Trainer: Michael Fennelly

Major wins
- Victoria Derby (1883); Melbourne Cup (1883); VRC St Leger (1884)

Martini-Henry (1880–1903) was a New Zealand thoroughbred racehorse who won the 1883 Melbourne Cup at only his second career start. He was the first New Zealand bred horse to win the race. He was called one of the finest thoroughbreds ever seen in Australia at the time.

== Background ==
Martini-Henry's sire was Musket and from Sylvia, who was by Fisherman and from Juliet, who was by Touchstone. He was Sylvia's last foal and the first to establish Musket as the sire of great performers.

Martini-Henry was purchased by the politician James White for something over 1,000 guineas, at the time the highest price paid for a yearling.

== Racing career ==
Martini-Henry's first ever race start was in the 1883 Victoria Derby. In a field of 9 runners he won by 2 lengths in the fastest Victoria Derby ever run up to that time.

Just days later he competed in his second race the Melbourne Cup. In a field of twenty-nine and before a crowd estimated at 100,000 people, he started the race as the 3/1 favourite. Always well placed during the race, he came with a well-timed run and was an easy winner, again establishing a race record and became the fifth horse to win the coveted Derby/Cup double.

Martini-Henry was successful in the 1884 VRC St Leger, however his final ever start came in the 1884 Caulfield Cup where he failed to finish the race due to a leg injury. The horse was saved though and retired to stud duties.

== Stud career ==
As a breeding stallion, his most notable progeny included:

- Acmena - AJC Oaks (1894), Champagne Stakes (1894)
- Corvette - AJC Oaks (1891)
- Litigant - VRC Oaks (1890)
- Mons Meg - Queen's Vase (1890)
- Prelude - AJC Oaks (1890)
- Rudolph - Champagne Stakes (1889), Caulfield Guineas (1889)
- Singapore - AJC Derby (1889)

Martini-Henry died at Bexley Station, Queensland on 9 May 1903 of a stomach tumour.
