= James Redfearn =

Australian cricketer

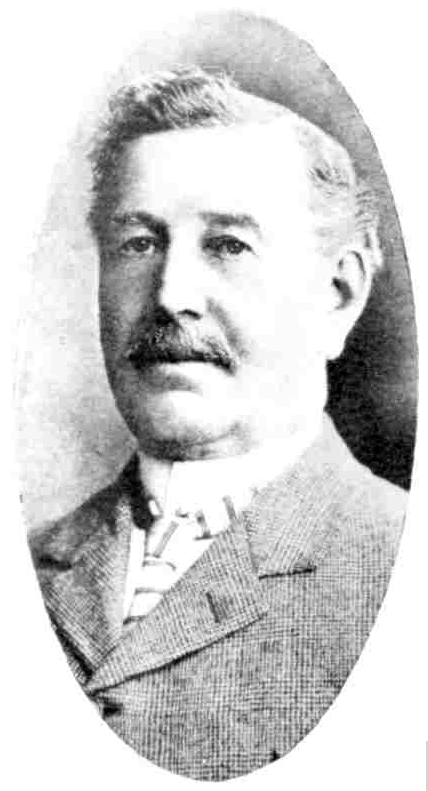

Personal information
- Born: c. 1836; Yorkshire, England
- Died: 10 March 1916 (aged 79); Glen Huntly, Melbourne, Australia
- Batting: Right-handed
- Role: Batsman

Domestic team information
- Years: Team
- 1862/63: Victoria
- 1863/64: Otago
- Source: Cricinfo, 12 June 2020

James Redfearn (c. 1836 – 10 March 1916) was an Australian cricketer and race-horse trainer. He played one first-class cricket match for Victoria during the 1862–63 season and one in New Zealand for Otago in 1863–64.

Redfearn was born in Yorkshire in England in 1836. He played for Victoria against New South Wales in February 1863 before captaining Otago to victory over Canterbury in 1863–64 in the first first-class match played in New Zealand. In the extremely low-scoring match, his innings of 14 and 13 made him the second-highest scorer on either side and he was described by Wisden after his death as a "good bat and very powerful hitter" who was also "good in the field".

Later Redfearn was a prominent trainer and breeder of race-horses in Victoria. After running stables in Ararat, Geelong, and then Williamstown, he set up an establishment next to Melbourne's Caulfield Racecourse in 1888, and lived in nearby Glen Huntly. Among his successes, he bred and trained Malvolio, the winner of the Melbourne Cup in 1891; his son George was the jockey.

Redfearn married Elspeth Denham in the Victorian town of Streatham in October 1865. He died in Glen Huntly in March 1916, aged 79.
