= William Pearson Sr. =

Australian politician

The Hon William Pearson (senior), (20 September 1818 – 10 August 1893), was a politician and horse-breeder in colonial Victoria (Australia).

== Early life ==
Pearson, one of the principal patrons of the turf in Australia, was the eldest son of Captain Hugh Pearson, R.N., of Hilton, parish of Kilmany, Fife, Scotland, and was born at Hilton. His mother was Helen, née Littlejohn. Pearson was educated at Edinburgh High School, went to sea and became third officer on an East Indiaman in 1838.

== Australia ==
Arriving in Adelaide in the John Cooper Victoria in March 1841, Pearson travelled overland to the Port Phillip District (then part of the Colony of New South Wales) and commenced squatting in Gippsland, taking up the Lindenow station on the Mitchell river, and after that Kilmany Park, near the junction of the Latrobe and Thomson rivers. Pearson was returned to the Victorian Legislative Assembly as member for North Gippsland November 1864 to December 1867. He also represented the Eastern Province in the Victorian Legislative Council from August 1881 (winning a by-election) to November 1882, then Gippsland Province until August 1893. He was the largest shareholder in the famous Long Tunnel gold mine, Walhalla. As an owner and breeder of racehorses, he dates back to 1842, since which time he has won several hundred races and bred a large number of winners by Warlock and Vagabond. At Grassdale, Gippsland, Pearson married on 4 August 1859 Eliza Laura, daughter of H. J. Travers, formerly of the East India Company Civil Service. Pearson died in East St Kilda, Victoria, Australia.
