= James White (New South Wales politician) =

Pastoralist, racehorse owner and politician in New South Wales, Australia

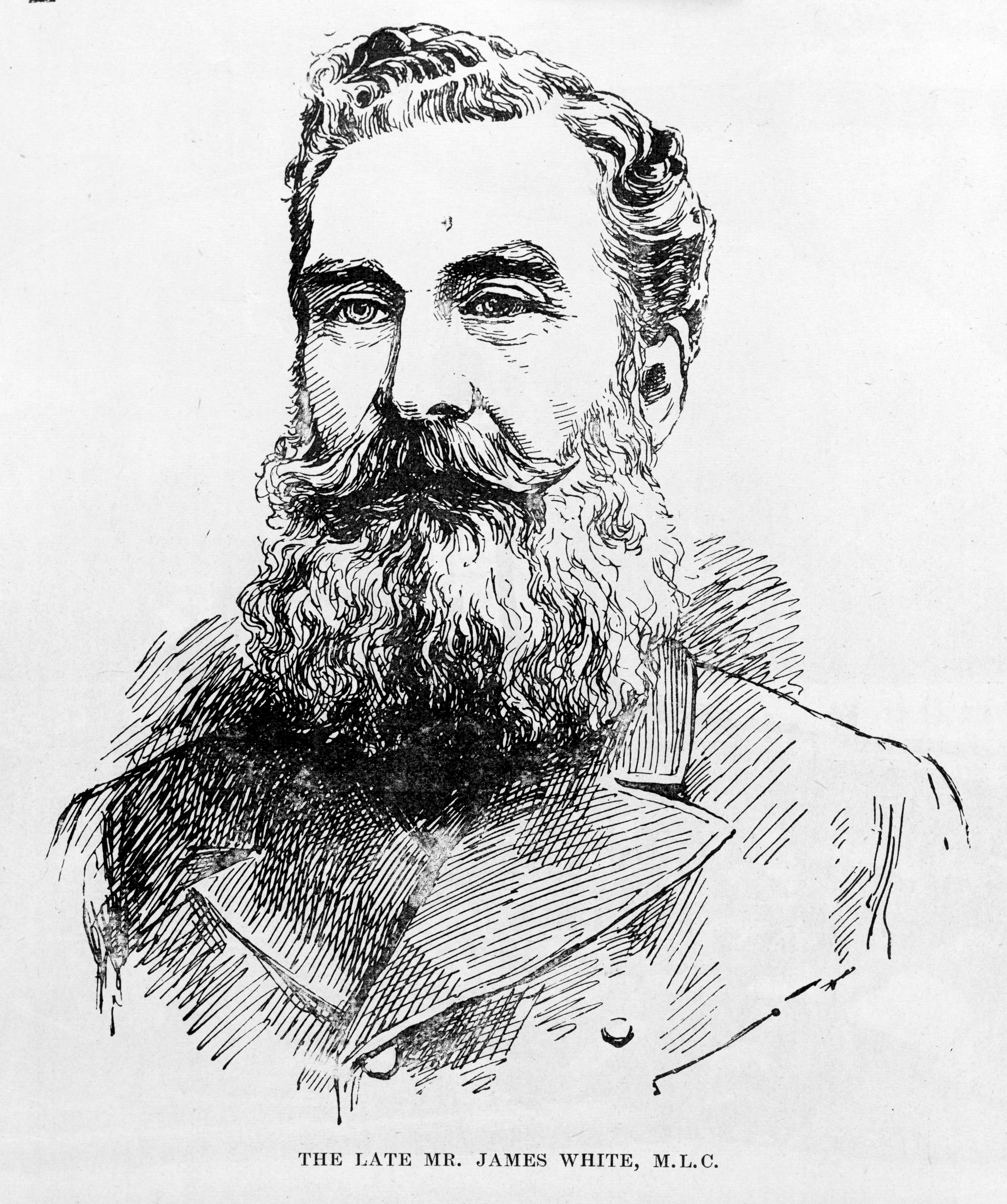

Member of the New South Wales Legislative Assembly for Upper Hunter
- In office 15 December 1864 – 8 May 1868
- Preceded by: Thomas Dangar
- Succeeded by: Archibald Bell

Member of the New South Wales Legislative Council
- In office 3 November 1874 – 13 July 1890

Personal details
- Born: 19 July 1828 Stroud, New South Wales
- Died: 13 July 1890 (aged 61) Cranbrook, Bellevue Hill, New South Wales
- Occupation: Pastoralist, politician, racehorse owner and breeder
- Known for: Thoroughbred horse racing

James White (19 July 1828 – 13 July 1890) was a pastoralist, politician in colonial New South Wales, a member of the New South Wales Legislative Assembly and later, the New South Wales Legislative Council. White was best known as a racehorse owner, breeder and punter.

== Early life ==
White was born in Stroud, New South Wales, the eldest son of overseer James White and Sarah née Crossman. He was educated at The King's School for four years and then by the Reverend John Gregor at West Maitland. His father died in 1842 when he was aged 13 and still at school. At the age of sixteen he was called upon to manage extensive station properties, including Edinglassie and gradually took up more and more outlying country on his own account, until he became one of the largest and most successful New South Wales squatters. On 9 July 1856 he married Emily Elizabeth Arndell at Merton,

He did a fair share of work in pioneering country on the Barwon, Hunter, and Castlereagh Rivers, and was almost uniformly successful in his enterprises. In 1868 White went to England, and remained away several years, during which time he visited all the principal cities of Europe. He returned to New South Wales in 1873, and purchased Cranbrook, alternating his time between there and Camelot, Kirkham, which was his primary stud known as Kirkham Stables.

== Politics ==
In December 1864 White was elected to the Assembly for the Upper Hunter, serving until his resignation in May 1868. After his return from Europe, he stood again for the Upper Hunter in 1872 but was defeated. He was nominated to the New South Wales Legislative Council on 3 November 1874, a position he held until his death. He did not hold any ministerial or parliamentary office.

== Horse racing ==
As a racing man, White was first known in connection with a steeplechaser called Hotspur, who won the A.J.C. Steeplechase in 1876. His first notable racehorse was Chester, who was trained in conjunction with Roodee by Etienne L. de Mestre, and in 1877 won the double—Victoria Derby and Melbourne Cup. Another of his horses, Democrat, won the Sydney Cup and Metropolitan in 1878, and in the spring of 1879 Palmyra won Mr. White his first Maribyrnong Plate. From around 1880 his horses were trained by Michael Fennelly at the Big Stable Newmarket in Randwick.

In 1880 Sapphire won the Oaks, and The Pontiff the AJC Metropolitan Handicap, and in 1883 Iolanthe won for him the Maribyrnong Plate, and Martini-Henry carried off the double—Derby and Melbourne Cup. Finding that from failing health he could not stand the excitement of a close attention to racing, Mr. White sold all his horses in training and yearlings in April 1890, and they realised phenomenal prices. Titan alone brought 4,000 guineas, the highest price ever given for a yearling in the Colonies, and the total for thirteen lots was 17,498 guineas. Mr. White continued his breeding establishment at Kirkham, New South Wales, with a view to racing in England. He was the most successful racing man ever known in Australia at the time. During the thirteen years he was racing White took a keen interest in everything pertaining to the welfare of the turf, and his colours of pale blue jacket, white sleeves and blue and white cap, were always popular with the public, because every one knew that once seen at the post they were there to try and win. His colts Kirkham and Narellan were both entered for the 1890 Epsom Derby, but Narellan was scratched, and Kirkham failed to secure a place, finishing 7th . Over his career 66 of his horses won 252 races and won more than £121,000 in prize money.

He was a long time member of the Australian Jockey Club, joining the committee and then becoming chairman in 1880, serving until his retirement in January 1890.

== Later life and death ==
White died at his residence Cranbrook on 12 July 1890 (aged 61), survived by his wife Emily, however they had no children. His estate was distributed between his wife, brothers and nephews.

== Gallery ==
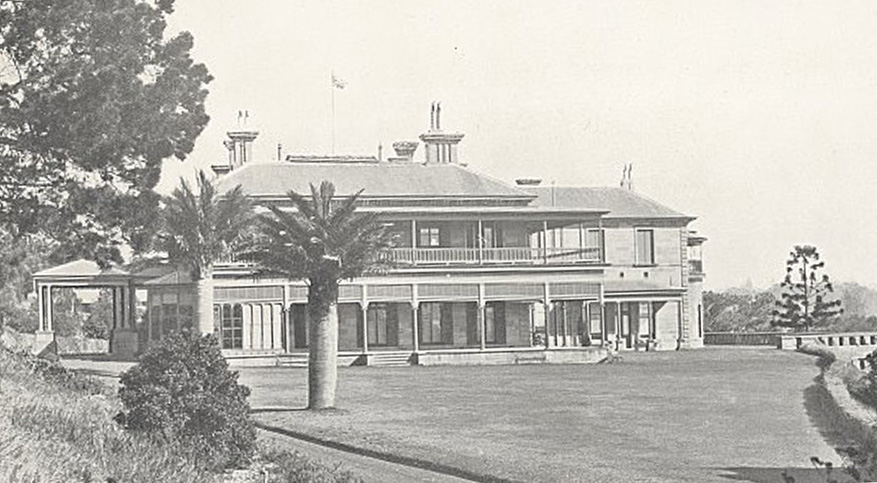
Cranbook c. 1917

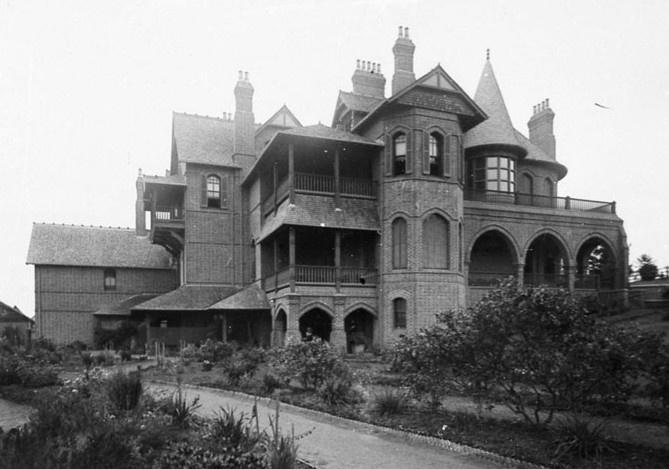
Camelot c. 1900

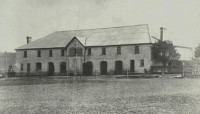
The stables of the original Kirkham property

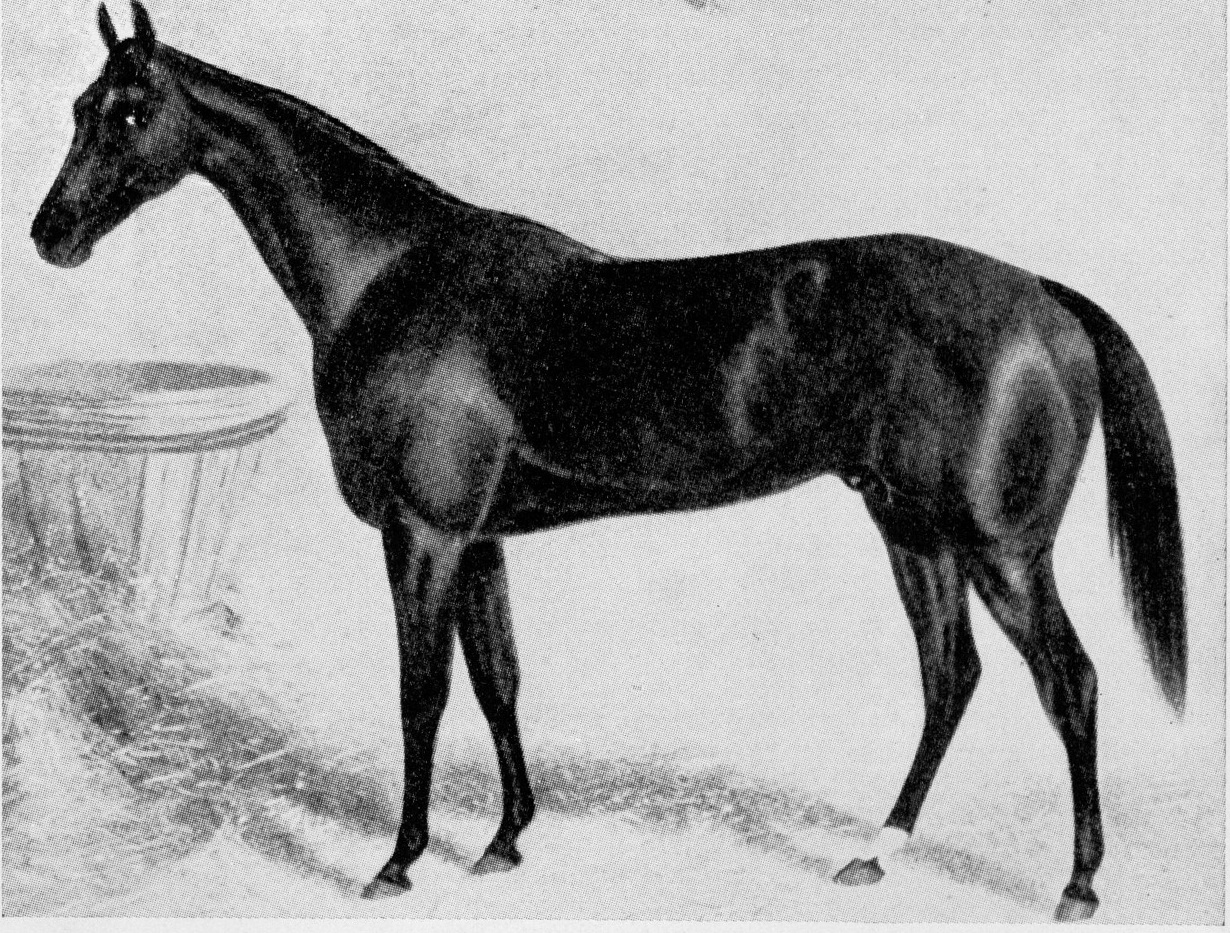
Chester c. 1878

James White's racing colours in Australia.

New South Wales Legislative Assembly
Preceded by Thomas Dangar	Member for Upper Hunter; 1864 – 1868	Succeeded by Archibald Bell
