= Members of the New South Wales Legislative Assembly, 1910–1913 =

Members of the New South Wales Legislative Assembly who served in the 22nd parliament of New South Wales held their seats from 1910 to 1913. They were elected at the 1910 state election on 14 October 1910. The Speakers were John Cann (15 November 1910 – 31 July 1911), Henry Willis (24 August 1911 – 22 July 1913) and Henry Morton 22 July 1913 – 22 December 1913.

Name	Party	Electorate	Term in office
Richard Arthur	Liberal Reform	Middle Harbour	1904–1932
William Ashford (Note: Henry Horne did not re-contest the Liverpool Plains by-election on 16 August 1911 which was won by Liberal candidate, John Perry by three votes. This result was overturned on appeal and at the second by-election on 28 October, Labor candidate, William Ashford was successful.)	Labor	Liverpool Plains	1910–1925
Frank Badgery (Note: Wollondilly Liberal MLA William McCourt died on 22 June 1913. Liberal candidate Frank Badgery won the by-election on 19 July.)	Liberal Reform	Wollondilly	1913–1915
Richard Ball	Liberal Reform	Corowa	1895–1898 1904–1937
George Beeby (Note: Blayney Labor MLA George Beeby resigned from the ministry, parliament and party in protest at the power of the extra-parliamentary Labor Party executive in December 1912. He won the by-election on 23 January 1913 after a run-off ballot.)	Labor / Independent	Blayney	1907–1913 1917–1920
George Black	Labor	Namoi	1891–1898 1910–1917
George Briner	Independent Liberal	Raleigh	1901–1920
William Brown	Liberal Reform	Durham	1907–1917
Albert Bruntnell	Liberal Reform	Annandale	1906–1907 1910–1913 1916–1929
George Burgess	Labor	Burrangong	1901–1917
John Cann	Labor	Broken Hill	1891–1916
Campbell Carmichael	Labor	Leichhardt	1907–1920
John Cochran	Labor	Darling Harbour	1910–1920
Arthur Cocks	Liberal Reform	St Leonards	1910–1925
John Cohen	Liberal Reform	Petersham	1898–1919
Tom Crawford	Labor	Marrickville	1910–1917
John Cusack	Labor	Queanbeyan	1910–1917
John Dacey (Note: Alexandria Labor MLA John Dacey died on 11 April 1912. The by-election on 18 May was won by Labor candidate Simon Hickey.)	Labor	Alexandria	1895–1912
Robert Donaldson	Independent Liberal	Wynyard	1898–1913
James Dooley	Labor	Hartley	1907–1927
Fred Downes	Liberal Reform	Camden	1904–1913
Bill Dunn (Note: Mudgee Labor MLA Bill Dunn and Liverpool Plains Labor MLA Henry Horne resigned from the Labor Party and Parliament on 25 July 1911 in protest at legislation on land ownership introduced by Lands Minister, Niels Nielsen. As a result, the Labor was left without a majority in the house and rather than face a vote of no confidence, the Ministry and Speaker resigned. This forced the House to be prorogued with the result that Cobar Labor MLA, Donald Macdonell, who was unwell but expected to recover, was automatically expelled for non-attendance during an entire session. By the time of the subsequent by-elections, Labor policy had been reversed and Nielsen had left the ministry.) (Note: Bill Dunn rejoined the party and successfully re-contested, the Mudgee by-election on 16 August 1911.)	Labor	Mudgee	1910–1911, 1911–1932, 1935–1950
Alfred Edden	Labor	Kahibah	1891–1920
John Estell	Labor	Waratah	1901–1922
James Fallick	Liberal Reform	Singleton	1901–1920
David Fell	Liberal Reform	Lane Cove	1904–1913
Charles Fern (Note: Donald Macdonell, automatically expelled for non-attendance while unwell was re-elected unopposed in the Cobar by-election on 7 October, but died three weeks later. The Labor candidate, Charles Fern, was unopposed at the by-election on 16 December.)	Labor	Cobar	1911–1918
John Fitzpatrick	Liberal Reform	Orange	1895–1904 1907–1930
Arthur Gardiner	Labor	Newcastle	1910–1922
John Gillies (Note: Maitland Independent Liberal MLA John Gillies died on 23 September 1911. The by-election on 28 October was won by Liberal candidate Charles Nicholson.)	Independent Liberal	Maitland	1891–1911
William Grahame	Labor	Wickham	1907–1920
Arthur Griffith	Labor	Sturt	1894–1903 1904–1920
Brinsley Hall	Liberal Reform	Hawkesbury	1901–1917
Thomas Henley	Liberal Reform	Burwood	1904–1935
Simon Hickey	Labor	Alexandria	1912–1922
George Hindmarsh	Liberal Reform	Rous	1905–1913
Robert Hollis	Labor	Newtown	1901–1917
William Holman	Labor	Cootamundra	1898–1920
Henry Horne	Labor	Liverpool Plains	1907–1911
Henry Hoyle	Labor	Surry Hills	1891–1894 1910–1917
John Hunt	Liberal Reform	Sherbrooke	1907–1920
Augustus James	Liberal Reform	Goulburn	1907–1920
George Jones	Labor	Gwydir	1902–1913
William Kearsley	Labor	Cessnock	1910–1921
Tom Keegan	Labor	Glebe	1910–1920 1921–1935
Andrew Kelly	Labor	Lachlan	1891–1894 1901–1913
William Latimer	Liberal Reform	Woollahra	1901–1920
Charles Lee	Liberal Reform	Tenterfield	1884–1920
Robert Levien	Independent Liberal	Tamworth	1880–1889, 1889–1913
Daniel Levy	Liberal Reform	Darlinghurst	1901–1937
John Lynch	Labor	Ashburnham	1907–1913
James Macarthur-Onslow	Liberal Reform	Bondi	1907–1922
Donald Macdonell	Labor	Cobar	1901–1911
William McCourt	Liberal Reform	Wollondilly	1882–1885 1887–1913
George McDonald	Labor	Bingara	1910–1920
John McFarlane	Liberal Reform	Clarence	1887–1915
Patrick McGarry	Labor	Murrumbidgee	1904–1920
Greg McGirr (Note: Denied further ministerial appointment Niels Nielsen resigned from the seat of Yass and Labor candidate Greg McGirr won the by-election on 19 July 1913.)	Labor	Yass	1913–1925
James McGowen	Labor	Redfern	1891–1917
Gordon McLaurin	Independent Liberal	Albury	1901–1913
John McNeill	Labor	Pyrmont	1902–1913
Richard Meagher	Labor	Phillip	1895 1898–1904 1907–1917
John Meehan	Labor	Darling	1904–1913
James Mercer	Labor	Rozelle	1907–1917
William Millard	Liberal Reform	Clyde	1894–1920 1920–1921
Gus Miller	Labor	Monaro	1889–1918
John Miller	Liberal Reform	Bathurst	1907–1913
Patrick Minahan	Labor	Belmore	1910–1917 1920–1927
James Morrish	Labor	King	1910–1917
Henry Morton	Independent Liberal	Hastings and Macleay	1910–1920
Mark Morton	Liberal Reform	Allowrie	1901–1920 1922–1938
Tom Moxham	Liberal Reform	Parramatta	1901–1916
Charles Nicholson	Liberal Reform	Maitland	1911–1920
John Nicholson	Labor	Wollongong	1891–1917
Niels Nielsen	Labor	Yass	1899–1913
John Nobbs	Liberal Reform	Granville	1888–1893 1898–1913
John Osborne	Labor	Paddington	1910–1919
Fred Page	Labor	Botany	1907–1917
Varney Parkes	Liberal Reform	Canterbury	1885–1888, 1891–1913
John Perry b 1845	Liberal Reform	Richmond	1889–1920
John Perry b 1949	Liberal Reform	Liverpool Plains	1904–1907 1911
Henry Peters	Labor	Deniliquin	1907–1914
Richard Price	Liberal Reform	Gloucester	1894–1904 1907–1922
William Robson	Liberal Reform	Ashfield	1905–1920
Robert Scobie	Labor	Murray	1901–1917
David Storey	Liberal Reform	Randwick	1894–1920
John Storey	Labor	Balmain	1901–1904 1907–1921
Robert Stuart-Robertson	Labor	Camperdown	1907–1933
William Taylor	Liberal Reform	St George	1908–1913
Follett Thomas	Liberal Reform	Gough	1903–1920
Thomas Thrower	Labor	Macquarie	1904–1917
John Treflé	Labor	Castlereagh	1906–1915
Thomas Waddell	Liberal Reform	Belubula	1897–1917
Charles Wade	Liberal Reform	Gordon	1903–1917
Henry Willis	Liberal Reform	Upper Hunter	1910–1913
William Wood	Liberal Reform	Bega	1894–1913

== See also ==
- McGowen ministry
- Results of the 1910 New South Wales state election
- Candidates of the 1910 New South Wales state election
