= Electoral results for the district of Liverpool Plains =

Election results for Liverpool Plains, New South Wales, Australia

Liverpool Plains, an electoral district of the Legislative Assembly in the Australian state of New South Wales, had three incarnations, from 1859 to 1880, from 1904 to 1920 and from 1927 to 1962.

Election	Member	Party
1859	Andrew Loder	None
1860 by	Charles Kemp	None
1860	Alexander Dick	None
1863 by	Marshall Burdekin	None
1864	John Lloyd	None
1869	Charles Cowper	None
1870 by	Charles Cowper	None
1871 by	Lewis Levy	None
1872	Hanley Bennett	None
1875	Hanley Bennett	None
1876 by	Hanley Bennett	None
1877	Hanley Bennett	None
Election	Member	Party
1904	John Perry	Independent Liberal
1907	Henry Horne	Labor
1910	Henry Horne	Labor
August 1911 by	John Perry	Liberal Reform
October 1911 by	William Ashford	Labor
1913	William Ashford	Labor
1917	William Ashford	Nationalist
Election	Member	Party
1927	Harry Carter	Country
1930	Harry Carter	Country
1932	Harry Carter	Country
1935	Harry Carter	Country
1938	Harry Carter	Country
1941	Roger Nott	Labor
1944	Roger Nott	Labor
1947	Roger Nott	Labor
1950	Roger Nott	Labor
1953	Roger Nott	Labor
1956	Roger Nott	Labor
1959	Roger Nott	Labor
1961 by	Frank O'Keefe	Country

== Election results ==
=== Elections in the 1960s ===
==== 1961 by-election ====
1961 Liverpool Plains by-election Saturday 25 March
Party	Candidate	Votes	%	±%
Country	Frank O'Keefe	7,312	50.21	+3.05
Labor	Robert Johnson	7,252	49.79	−1.89
Total formal votes		14,564	98.89	−0.05
Informal votes		163	1.11	+0.05
Turnout		14,727	82.30	−12.43
Country gain from Labor		Swing	+2.5	

Roger Nott (Labor) resigned.

=== Elections in the 1950s ===
==== 1959 ====
1959 New South Wales state election: Liverpool Plains
Party	Candidate	Votes	%	±%
Labor	Roger Nott	8,694	51.7	
Country	Frank O'Keefe	7,933	47.2	
Independent	John Pender	195	1.2	
Total formal votes		16,822	98.9	
Informal votes		180	1.1	
Turnout		17,002	94.7	
Two-party-preferred result
Labor	Roger Nott	8,792	52.3	
Country	Frank O'Keefe	8,030	47.7	
Labor hold		Swing		

==== 1956 ====
1956 New South Wales state election: Liverpool Plains
Party	Candidate	Votes	%	±%
Labor	Roger Nott	9,109	54.7	−4.3
Country	Geoffrey Thomas	4,868	29.2	+0.9
Liberal	Henry Gregson	2,609	15.7	+2.9
Independent	John Pender	72	0.4	+0.4
Total formal votes		16,658	99.2	+0.3
Informal votes		139	0.8	−0.3
Turnout		16,797	94.0	−1.9
Two-party-preferred result
Labor	Roger Nott	9,406	56.5	−3.5
Country	Geoffrey Thomas	7,252	43.5	+3.5
Labor hold		Swing	−3.5	

==== 1953 ====
1953 New South Wales state election: Liverpool Plains
Party	Candidate	Votes	%	±%
Labor	Roger Nott	9,560	59.0	
Country	Frank O'Keefe	4,583	28.3	
Liberal	James Reeves	2,071	12.8	
Total formal votes		16,214	98.9	
Informal votes		180	1.1	
Turnout		16,394	95.9	
Two-party-preferred result
Labor	Roger Nott	9,728	60.0	
Country	Frank O'Keefe	6,486	40.0	
Labor hold		Swing		

==== 1950 ====
1950 New South Wales state election: Liverpool Plains
Party	Candidate	Votes	%	±%
Labor	Roger Nott	7,851	51.8	
Country	Frank O'Keefe	4,791	31.6	
Liberal	Keith Mitchell	2,522	16.6	
Total formal votes		15,164	99.0	
Informal votes		147	1.0	
Turnout		15,311	89.0	
Two-party-preferred result
Labor	Roger Nott		54.0 (Note: Two party preferred vote was estimated.)	
Country	Frank O'Keefe		46.0	
Labor hold		Swing		

=== Elections in the 1940s ===
==== 1947 ====
1947 New South Wales state election: Liverpool Plains
Party	Candidate	Votes	%	±%
Labor	Roger Nott	6,894	54.9	−3.8
Country	Cleve Slacksmith	5,662	45.1	+3.8
Total formal votes		12,556	98.9	+0.4
Informal votes		133	1.1	−0.4
Turnout		12,689	95.3	+5.4
Labor hold		Swing	−3.8	

==== 1944 ====
1944 New South Wales state election: Liverpool Plains
Party	Candidate	Votes	%	±%
Labor	Roger Nott	6,715	58.7	+8.1
Country	James Scott	4,726	41.3	+24.2
Total formal votes		11,441	98.5	+0.4
Informal votes		170	1.5	−0.4
Turnout		11,611	89.9	−3.4
Labor hold		Swing	N/A	

==== 1941 ====
1941 New South Wales state election: Liverpool Plains
Party	Candidate	Votes	%	±%
Labor	Roger Nott	6,169	50.6	
Country	James Scott	2,080	17.1	
Country	Alister McMullin	1,978	16.2	
Country	Alfred Yeo	1,956	16.1	
Total formal votes		12,183	98.1	
Informal votes		239	1.9	
Turnout		12,422	93.3	
Labor gain from Country		Swing		

- Preferences were not distributed.
The sitting member Harry Carter (Country) retired. Alfred Yeo (Country) was the sitting member for Castlereagh.

=== Elections in the 1930s ===
==== 1938 ====
1938 New South Wales state election: Liverpool Plains
Party	Candidate	Votes	%	±%
Country	Harry Carter	7,489	60.1	−1.0
Labor	Thomas Ryan	4,975	39.9	+1.0
Total formal votes		12,464	98.5	−0.1
Informal votes		194	1.5	+0.1
Turnout		12,658	95.2	−0.6
Country hold		Swing	−1.0	

==== 1935 ====
1935 New South Wales state election: Liverpool Plains
Party	Candidate	Votes	%	±%
Country	Harry Carter	7,590	61.1	−5.2
Labor (NSW)	Percy Forsyth	4,835	38.9	+5.2
Total formal votes		12,425	98.6	+0.2
Informal votes		181	1.4	−0.2
Turnout		12,606	95.8	−0.6
Country hold		Swing	−5.2	

==== 1932 ====
1932 New South Wales state election: Liverpool Plains
Party	Candidate	Votes	%	±%
Country	Harry Carter	7,932	66.3	+15.4
Labor (NSW)	Elijah Smith	4,030	33.7	−15.4
Total formal votes		11,962	98.4	+0.3
Informal votes		193	1.6	−0.3
Turnout		12,155	96.4	+0.5
Country hold		Swing	+15.4	

==== 1930 ====
1930 New South Wales state election: Liverpool Plains
Party	Candidate	Votes	%	±%
Country	Harry Carter	6,013	50.4	
Labor	Thomas Egan	5,920	49.6	
Total formal votes		11,933	98.1	
Informal votes		227	1.9	
Turnout		12,160	95.9	
Country hold		Swing		

=== Elections in the 1920s ===
==== 1927 ====
1927 New South Wales state election: Liverpool Plains
Party	Candidate	Votes	%	±%
Country	Harry Carter	6,813	54.7	
Labor	Michael Hagan	5,630	45.3	
Total formal votes		12,443	98.6	
Informal votes		174	1.4	
Turnout		12,617	85.4	
Country win		(new seat)		

District recreated

==== 1920 - 1927 ====
District abolished

=== Elections in the 1910s ===
==== 1917 ====
1917 New South Wales state election: Liverpool Plains
Party	Candidate	Votes	%	±%
Nationalist	William Ashford	3,593	52.9	+21.3
Labor	Abraham Berry	3,194	47.1	−4.9
Total formal votes		6,787	99.0	+2.8
Informal votes		69	1.0	−2.8
Turnout		6,856	62.9	−6.7
Member changed to Nationalist from Labor				

The sitting member William Ashford was expelled from Labor in the November 1916 Labor split over conscription.

==== 1913 ====
1913 New South Wales state election: Liverpool Plains
Party	Candidate	Votes	%	±%
Labor	William Ashford	3,598	52.0	
Liberal Reform	George Higgins	2,183	31.6	
Farmers and Settlers	Augustus Perrett	1,137	16.4	
Total formal votes		6,918	96.2	
Informal votes		270	3.8	
Turnout		7,188	69.6	
Labor hold				

==== October 1911 by-election ====
1911 Liverpool Plains by-election Saturday 28 October
Party	Candidate	Votes	%	±%
Labor	William Ashford	4,030	53.5	+3.5
Liberal Reform	John Perry (defeated)	3,524	46.7	−3.5
Total formal votes		7,554	100.0	+1.5
Informal votes		0	0.0	−1.5
Turnout		7,554	83.0 (Note: estimate based on an electoral roll of 9,100 at the 1910 election.)	+18.0
Labor gain from Liberal Reform				

The Elections and Qualifications Committee declared the August by-election void.

==== August 1911 by-election ====
1911 Liverpool Plains by-election Wednesday 16 August
Party	Candidate	Votes	%	±%
Liberal Reform	John Perry	2,912	50.0	+9.8
Labor	William Ashford	2,909	50.0	−9.8
Total formal votes		5,821	98.5	+0.3
Informal votes		91	1.5	−0.3
Turnout		5,912	65.0	
Liberal Reform gain from Labor				

Henry Horne (Labor) resigned.

==== 1910 ====
1910 New South Wales state election: Liverpool Plains
Party	Candidate	Votes	%	±%
Labour	Henry Horne	3,265	56.9	
Farmers and Settlers	Robert Patten	2,473	43.1	
Total formal votes		5,738	97.9	
Informal votes		122	2.1	
Turnout		5,860	64.4	
Labour hold				

=== Elections in the 1900s ===
==== 1907 ====
1907 New South Wales state election: Liverpool Plains
Party	Candidate	Votes	%	±%
Labour	Henry Horne	2,519	51.5	
Liberal Reform	John Perry	2,373	48.5	
Total formal votes		4,892	96.9	
Informal votes		155	3.1	
Turnout		5,047	66.1	
Labour gain from Independent Liberal				

SItting member John Perry had been elected as an Independent Liberal candidate at the 1904 election, and joined Liberal Reform in 1907.

==== 1904 ====
1904 New South Wales state election: Liverpool Plains
Party	Candidate	Votes	%	±%
Independent Liberal	John Perry	1,650	45.8	
Labour	David Hall	1,629	45.2	
Liberal Reform	George Nowland	323	9.0	
Total formal votes		3,602	98.9	
Informal votes		39	1.1	
Turnout		3,641	54.3	
Independent Liberal win		(new seat)		

Liverpool Plains was a re-established seat, comprising parts of the abolished seats of Gunnedah, Quirindi, and Wellington. The member for Gunnedah was David Hall (Labour). The member for Quirindi was Robert Levien (Progressive) who successfully contested Tamworth. The member for Wellington was John Haynes (Liberal Reform) who unsuccessfully contested Mudgee.

District recreated

==== 1880 - 1904 ====
District abolished

=== Elections in the 1870s ===
==== 1877 ====
1877 New South Wales colonial election: Liverpool Plains Saturday 3 November
Candidate	Votes	%
Hanley Bennett (re-elected)	703	42.5
Michael Burke	536	32.4
George Grehan	415	25.1
Total formal votes	1,654	100.0
Informal votes	0	0.0
Turnout	1,654	36.4

==== 1876 by-election ====
1876 Liverpool Plains by-election Monday 5 June
Candidate	Votes	%
Hanley Bennett (re-elected)	843	46.2
Sydney Burdekin	823	45.2
William Gordon	126	6.9
George McLean	30	1.6
Total formal votes	1,823	100.0
Informal votes	0	0.0
Turnout	1,823	44.0

Hanley Bennett was insolvent.

==== 1875 ====
1874–75 New South Wales colonial election: Liverpool Plains Wednesday 6 January 1875
Candidate	Votes	%
Hanley Bennett (re-elected)	766	51.5
Daniel Macquarie	721	48.5
Total formal votes	1,487	97.8
Informal votes	33	2.2
Turnout	1,520	47.6

==== 1872 ====
1872 New South Wales colonial election: Liverpool Plains Monday 11 March
Candidate	Votes	%
Hanley Bennett (elected)	532	45.1
Francis Rusden	207	17.5
William Gordon	152	12.9
Bowie Wilson	151	12.8
George Wallace	125	10.6
Alexander Bowman	13	1.1
Total formal votes	1,180	100.0
Informal votes	0	0.0
Turnout	1,230	43.1

==== 1871 by-election ====
1871 Liverpool Plains by-election Monday 9 January
Candidate	Votes	%
Lewis Levy (elected)	374	61.8
Hanley Bennett	198	32.7
John Robertson	33	5.5
Total formal votes	605	100.0
Informal votes	0	0.0
Turnout	605	21.9

Charles Cowper was appointed Agent General in London.

==== 1870 by-election ====
1870 Liverpool Plains by-election Saturday 29 January
Candidate	Votes	%
Charles Cowper (re-elected)	721	85.6
Edward Parnell	120	14.3
Joseph Abbott	1	0.1
Total formal votes	842	100.0
Informal votes	0	0.0
Turnout	842	35.6

Charles Cowper was appointed Premier and Colonial Secretary.

=== Elections in the 1860s ===
==== 1869 ====
1869–70 New South Wales colonial election: Liverpool Plains Thursday 23 December 1869
Candidate	Votes	%
Charles Cowper (elected)	468	91.4
Hanley Bennett	44	8.6
Total formal votes	512	100.0
Informal votes	0	0.0
Turnout	512	21.6

==== 1864 ====
1864–65 New South Wales colonial election: Liverpool Plains Saturday 24 December 1864
Candidate	Votes	%
John Lloyd (elected)	unopposed	

==== 1863 by-election ====
1863 Liverpool Plains by-election Thursday 29 January
Candidate	Votes	%
Marshall Burdekin (elected)	319	53.5
William Mullen	277	46.5
Total formal votes	596	100.0
Informal votes	0	0.0
Turnout	596	37.5

The by-election was caused by the resignation of Alexander Dick.

==== 1860 ====
1860 New South Wales colonial election: Liverpool Plains Saturday 15 December
Candidate	Votes	%
Alexander Dick (elected)	436	79.1
Charles Kemp (defeated)	115	20.9
Total formal votes	551	100.0
Informal votes	0	0.0
Turnout	551	39.4

==== 1860 by-election ====
1860 Liverpool Plains by-election Tuesday 10 April
Candidate	Votes	%
Charles Kemp (elected)	164	55.6
Thomas Dangar	131	44.4
Total formal votes	295	100.0
Informal votes	0	0.0
Turnout	295	25.0

Andrew Loder resigned.

=== Elections in the 1850s ===
==== 1859 ====
1859 New South Wales colonial election: Liverpool Plains Tuesday 5 July
Candidate	Votes	%
Andrew Loder (elected)	380	71.6
Francis Rusden	151	28.4
Total formal votes	531	100.0
Informal votes	0	0.0
Turnout	534	45.3
