= Candidates of the 1910 New South Wales state election =

This is a list of candidates for the 1910 New South Wales state election. The election was held on 14 October 1910.

== Retiring Members ==
=== Liberal ===
- Charles Barton MLA (Macquarie)
- Ernest Broughton MLA (King)
- William Mahony MLA (Annandale)
- Richard McCoy MLA (Marrickville)

=== Independent ===
- Albert Collins MLA (Namoi)

== Legislative Assembly ==
Sitting members are shown in bold text. Successful candidates are highlighted in the relevant colour. Where there is possible confusion, an asterisk (*) is also used.

Electorate	Held by	Labor candidate	Liberal candidate	Other candidates
Albury	Ind Liberal	Benjamin Lloyd		**Gordon McLaurin** (Ind Lib)
Alexandria	Labor	**John Dacey**	George Smith	James Horne (Ind)
Allowrie	Liberal	Charles Craig	**Mark Morton**	
Annandale	Liberal	George Davidson	Albert Bruntnell	
Armidale	Liberal	Francis Bryant	**Edmund Lonsdale**	
Ashburnham	Labor	**John Lynch**	Reginald Weaver	
Ashfield	Liberal	Francis Cowling	**William Robson**	
Balmain	Labor	**John Storey**	John Hurley	
Bathurst	Liberal	Joseph Coates	**John Miller**	
Bega	Liberal	Francis Riley	**William Wood**	
Belmore	Labor	**Patrick Minahan**		John English (Ind Lab)
Belubula	Liberal	Cornelius Danahey	**Thomas Waddell**	
Bingara	Liberal	George McDonald	**Samuel Moore**	
Blayney	Labor	**George Beeby**	William Kelk	
Botany	Labor	**Fred Page**	George Howe	
Broken Hill	Labor	**John Cann**		
Burrangong	Labor	**George Burgess**	James Carroll	
Burwood	Liberal	Thomas Tytherleigh	**Thomas Henley**	
Camden	Liberal	Frederick Webster	**Fred Downes**	
Camperdown	Labor	**Robert Stuart-Robertson**	Thomas Jessep	
Canterbury	Liberal	Ernest Burgess	**Varney Parkes**	John Gager (Ind)
Castlereagh	Labor	**John Treflé**	William Donnelly	
Clarence	Liberal	William Cahill	**John McFarlane**	
Clyde	Liberal	William Tomkins	**William Millard**	Samuel Rose (Ind)
Cobar	Labor	**Donald Macdonell**		
Cootamundra	Labor	**William Holman**	Granville Ryrie	
Corowa	Liberal	John Grant	**Richard Ball**	
Darling	Labor	**John Meehan**	William Shepherd	
Darling Harbour	Labor	**John Cochran**		Andrew Thomson (Ind Lab)
Darlinghurst	Liberal	Jack FitzGerald	**Daniel Levy**	John Haynes (Ind)
Deniliquin	Labor	**Henry Peters**		Arthur Trethowan (FSA)
Durham	Liberal	Robert Elkin	**William Brown**	Walter Bennett (Ind Lib)
Glebe	Liberal	Tom Keegan	**James Hogue**	
Gloucester	Liberal	Con Hogan	**Richard Price**	James Gregg (Ind)
Gordon	Liberal	Conrad Von Hagen	**Charles Wade**	
Gough	Liberal	Henry Colditz	**Follett Thomas**	
Goulburn	Liberal	Percy Hollis	**Augustus James**	
Granville	Liberal	Francis McLean	**John Nobbs**	
Gwydir	Labor	**George Jones**	Edward Spear	
Hartley	Labor	**James Dooley**	Sydney Innes-Noad	
Hastings and Macleay	Liberal	Hugh Bridson	**Robert Davidson**	Henry Morton (Ind)
Hawkesbury	Liberal	Albert Jones	**Brinsley Hall**	
Kahibah	Labor	**Alfred Edden**	Walter Clutton	
King	Liberal	James Morrish	Neville Mayman	Philip Cullen (Ind); Michael Egan (Ind); James Jones (Ind); Robert Roberts (Ind)
Lachlan	Labor	**Andrew Kelly**	William Ewers	
Lane Cove	Liberal	Sydney Hutton	**David Fell**	
Leichhardt	Labor	**Campbell Carmichael**	Frederick Reed	
Liverpool Plains	Labor	**Henry Horne**		Robert Patten (FSA)
Macquarie	Liberal	Thomas Thrower	James Burns	
Maitland	Ind Liberal	Laurence Vial		**John Gillies** (Ind Lib)
Marrickville	Liberal	Thomas Crawford	Rupert McCoy	Tedbar Barden (Ind); Arthur Blackwood (Ind Lib)
Middle Harbour	Liberal	Stephen O'Brien	**Richard Arthur**	David Middleton (Ind Lib)
Monaro	Labor	**Gus Miller**	William Wright	
Mudgee	Liberal	Bill Dunn	**Robert Jones**	
Murray	Labor	**Robert Scobie**		
Murrumbidgee	Labor	**Patrick McGarry**	John Fletcher	
Namoi	Independent	George Black		Hubert O'Reilly (Ind Lib)
Newcastle	Liberal	Arthur Gardiner	**Owen Gilbert**	
Newtown	Labor	**Robert Hollis**	William Ferguson	Patrick Quinn (Ind)
Northumberland	Labor	**William Kearsley**		Reginald Harris (Ind Lib)
Orange	Liberal	Greg McGirr	**John Fitzpatrick**	
Paddington	Liberal	John Osborne	**Charles Oakes**	Francis Meacle (Ind Lib)
Parramatta	Liberal	Dowell O'Reilly	**Tom Moxham**	
Petersham	Liberal	Adamson Dawson	**John Cohen**	
Phillip	Ind Liberal	**Richard Meagher**	Henry Manning	William Leonard (Ind)
Pyrmont	Labor	**John McNeill**	John Sutton	William McCristal (Ind Lab)
Queanbeyan	Labor	**John Cusack**	Joseph Roberts	
Raleigh	Ind Liberal	Clem Johnson		**George Briner** (Ind Lib)
Randwick	Ind Liberal	George Young		**David Storey** (Ind Lib)
Redfern	Labor	**James McGowen**	John Fegan	
Richmond	Liberal	William Gillies	**John Perry**	
Rous	Liberal	Alfred Taylor	**George Hindmarsh**	
Rozelle	Labor	**James Mercer**	Tom Hoskins	
St George	Liberal	William Bagnall	**William Taylor**	
St Leonards	Ind Liberal	George Down	Arthur Cocks	**Edward Clark** (Ind Lib)
Sherbrooke	Liberal	Andrew Thompson	**John Hunt**	
Singleton	Liberal	Sydney Pender	**James Fallick**	
Sturt	Labor	**Arthur Griffith**	Henry Kelly	
Surry Hills	Liberal	Henry Hoyle	**Sir James Graham**	John Eaton (Ind)
Tamworth	Ind Liberal	John Lord		**Robert Levien** (Ind Lib)
Tenterfield	Liberal	Reginald Whereat	**Charles Lee**	Robert Pyers (Ind)
Upper Hunter	Labor	**William Ashford**	Henry Willis	
Waratah	Labor	**John Estell**	Thomas Collins	
Waverley	Liberal	Walter Duncan	**James Macarthur-Onslow**	Henry Douglass (Ind); Robert Watkins (Ind Lib)
Wickham	Labor	**William Grahame**	Thomas Allsopp	
Wollondilly	Liberal	Charles Fern	**William McCourt**	
Wollongong	Labor	**John Nicholson**	Edward Beeby	
Woollahra	Liberal	James McCarthy	**William Latimer**	Leo Robinson (Ind)
Wynyard	Ind Liberal	Walter Boston		**Robert Donaldson** (Ind Lib)
Yass	Labor	**Niels Nielsen**	Bernard Grogan	

== See also ==
- Members of the New South Wales Legislative Assembly, 1910–1913
