= Electoral results for the district of Darling Harbour =

Election results for Darling Harbour, New South Wales, Australia

Darling Harbour, an electoral district of the Legislative Assembly in the Australian state of New South Wales was created in 1904 and abolished in 1913.

== Members ==
Election	Member	Party
1904	William Daley	Labour
1907	John Norton	Independent
1910 by	John Cochran	Labor
1910	John Cochran	Labor
1913	John Cochran	Labor
1917	John Cochran	Labor

== Election results ==
=== Elections in the 1910s ===
==== 1917 ====
1917 New South Wales state election: Darling Harbour
Party	Candidate	Votes	%	±%
Labor	John Cochran	3,264	73.2	+8.3
Nationalist	William Phillips	1,130	25.3	+25.3
Independent	William McMahon	65	1.5	+1.5
Total formal votes		4,459	98.3	+2.7
Informal votes		77	1.7	−2.7
Turnout		4,536	46.8	−7.6
Labor hold		Swing	+8.3	

==== 1913 ====
1913 New South Wales state election: Darling Harbour
Party	Candidate	Votes	%	±%
Labor	John Cochran	3,585	64.9	
Independent Labor	Andrew Thomson	1,691	30.6	
Australasian Socialist	Frederick Riley	202	3.7	
Independent	Arthur Gloag	45	0.8	
Total formal votes		5,523	95.6	
Informal votes		255	4.4	
Turnout		5,778	54.4	
Labor hold				

==== 1910 ====
1910 New South Wales state election: Darling Harbour
Party	Candidate	Votes	%	±%
Labour	John Cochran	2,998	65.4	+22.7
Independent Labour	Andrew Thomson	1,586	34.6	
Total formal votes		4,584	96.1	−0.6
Informal votes		187	3.9	+0.6
Turnout		4,771	59.7	−7.2
Labour gain from Independent				

- John Norton (Independent) had won the 1907 election for Darling Harbour; however, he resigned to stand as a Senator for NSW at the 1910 federal election. The by-election in April 1910 was won by John Cochran (Labour) who retained the seat at this election.

==== 1910 by-election ====
1910 Darling Harbour by-election Wednesday 13 April
Party	Candidate	Votes	%	±%
Labour	John Cochran	1,592	76.3	+51.6
Independent Labor	William Macey	311	14.9	
Liberal Reform	Henry Kelly	164	7.9	−6.1
Independent	James Jones	21	1.0	
Total formal votes		2,088	98.3	+1.7
Informal votes		36	1.7	−1.7
Turnout		2,124	29.5 (Note: estimate based on an electoral roll of 7,190 at the 1907 election.)	−37.4
Labour hold		Swing		

John Norton (Independent) resigned to unsuccessfully contest the 1910 federal Senate election for NSW.

==== 1907 ====
1907 New South Wales state election: Darling Harbour
Party	Candidate	Votes	%	±%
Independent	John Norton	1,666	35.8	
Labour	William Daley	1,146	24.7	
International Socialist	Harry Holland	746	16.1	
Liberal Reform	George Whatmore	650	14.0	
Independent	Evan Jones	435	9.4	
Independent	Sydney Green	6	0.1	
Total formal votes		4,649	96.7	
Informal votes		161	3.3	
Turnout		4,810	66.9	
Independent gain from Labour (Note: John Norton was backed by breakaway local Labour Leagues who objected to the endorsement of William Daley.)				

==== 1904 ====
1904 New South Wales state election: Darling Harbour
Party	Candidate	Votes	%	±%
Labour	William Daley	1,907	43.2	
Liberal Reform	Evan Jones	1,395	31.6	
Independent	Wilfred Spruson	1,099	24.9	
Independent	Henry Connell	7	0.2	
Independent	Sydney Green	4	0.1	
Independent	William Scafe	4	0.1	
Total formal votes		4,416	97.6	
Informal votes		109	2.4	
Turnout		4,525	50.9	
Labour win		(new seat)		

Darling Harbour was a new seat consisting of the abolished seats of Sydney-Gipps, Sydney-Lang, and parts of the abolished seats of Sydney-King and Sydney-Denison. The member for Sydney-Gipps was William Daley (Labour) and he won the Labour pre-selection ahead of the member for Sydney-Lang, John Power, who did not contest the election. The member for Sydney-King was Ernest Broughton (Progressive) who successfully contested King as a Liberal Reform candidate. The member for Sydney-Denison was Andrew Kelly who successfully contested The Lachlan.
