= List of elections in 1911 =

The following elections occurred in the year 1911.

== Africa ==
- Liberian general election
- Mauritius general election
- Southern Rhodesian Legislative Council election

== Europe ==
- Bulgarian Constitutional Assembly election
- Bulgarian parliamentary election
- Cisleithanian legislative election
- Croatian parliamentary election
- Finnish parliamentary election
- Luxembourg general election
- Monegasque general election
- Montenegrin parliamentary election
- Portuguese Constituent National Assembly election
- Portuguese presidential election
- Romanian general election
- Swedish general election
- Swiss federal election

=== United Kingdom ===
- 1911 Arfon by-election
- 1911 Barnstaple by-election
- 1911 Bethnal Green South West by-election
- 1911 Birmingham South by-election
- 1911 Bootle by-election
- 1911 Brentford by-election
- 1911 Brighton by-election
- 1911 Bristol East by-election
- 1911 Cambridge University by-election
- 1911 Cheltenham by-election
- 1911 East Cork by-election
- 1911 East Dorset by-election
- 1911 East Wicklow by-election
- 1911 Forest of Dean by-election
- 1911 Glasgow Tradeston by-election
- 1911 Govan by-election
- 1911 Haddingtonshire by-election
- 1911 Hitchin by-election
- 1911 Horncastle by-election
- 1911 Keighley by-election
- 1911 Kilmarnock Burghs by-election
- 1911 Middleton by-election
- 1911 North East Lanarkshire by-election
- 1911 North Ayrshire by-election
- 1911 Oldham by-election
- 1911 West Ham North by-election

== North America ==
=== Canada ===
- Canadian federal election
- Edmonton municipal by-election
- Nova Scotia general election
- Ontario general election
- Toronto municipal election

=== United States ===
==== United States gubernatorial ====
- 1911 Arizona gubernatorial election
- 1911 Kentucky gubernatorial election
- 1911 Maryland gubernatorial election
- 1911 Massachusetts gubernatorial election
- 1911 Mississippi gubernatorial election
- 1911 New Mexico gubernatorial election
- 1911 Rhode Island gubernatorial election
- 1911 United States gubernatorial elections

==== United States House of Representatives ====
- 1911 United States House of Representatives elections
- 1911 United States House of Representatives election in Arizona

==== United States Senate ====
- 1910–11 United States Senate elections
- 1911–12 United States Senate elections
- 1911 United States Senate election in California
- 1911 United States Senate election in Massachusetts
- 1911 United States Senate election in New Jersey
- 1911 United States Senate election in New York
- 1911 United States Senate election in Pennsylvania
- 1911 United States Senate election in Wisconsin

==== United States mayoral elections ====
- 1911 Baltimore mayoral election
- 1911 Chicago mayoral election
- 1911 Los Angeles mayoral election
- 1911 Oklahoma City mayoral election
- 1911 Philadelphia mayoral election
- 1911 San Diego mayoral election
- 1911 San Francisco mayoral election

== Oceania ==
=== Australia ===
- August 1911 Liverpool Plains state by-election
- September 1911 Cobar state by-election
- December 1911 Cobar state by-election
- October 1911 Liverpool Plains state by-election
- Constitutional referendum
- 1911 Batman by-election
- 1911 Boothby by-election
- 1911 Maitland state by-election
- 1911 Mudgee state by-election
- 1911 North Sydney by-election
- Victorian state election
- Western Australian state election

=== New Zealand ===
- General election
- Christchurch North by-election

== See also ==
- Category:1911 elections
