= September 1911 Cobar state by-election =

- 23 September 1911

Electoral district of Cobar in the New South Wales Legislative Assembly
- Registered: 7,806 (Note: Estimate based on a roll of 7,806 at the 1910 election.)
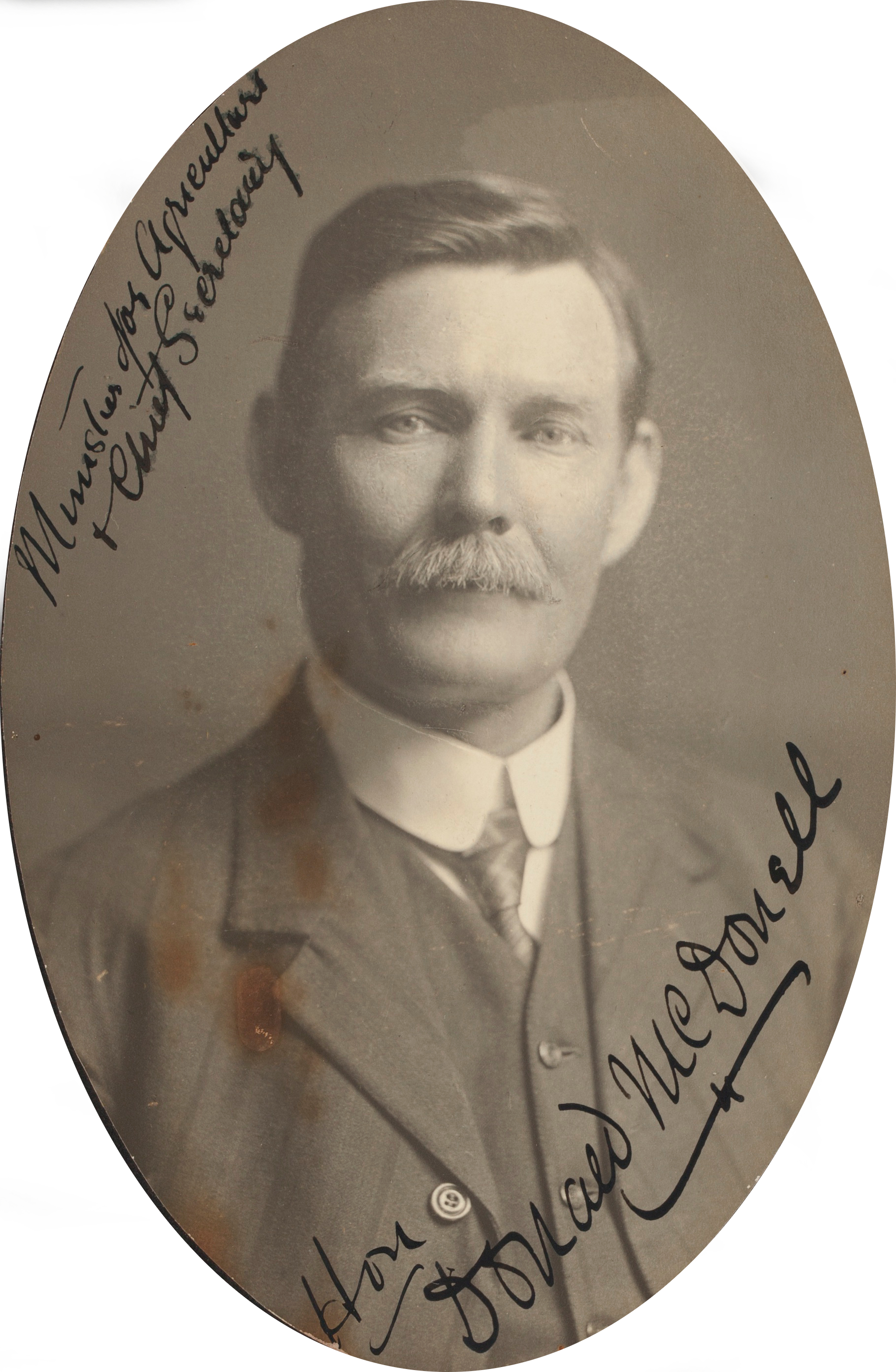
	First party
Candidate	Donald Macdonell
Party	Labour
Popular vote	Unopposed
MP before election
Donald Macdonell
Labour
Elected MP
Donald Macdonell
Labour

A by-election was held for the New South Wales Legislative Assembly electorate of Cobar on 23 September 1911 because Donald Macdonell (Labour) was absent for a full session of parliament.

Macdonell had been absent because he was unwell but he was expected to recover.

The members for Mudgee, Bill Dunn, and Liverpool Plains, Henry Hoyle, resigned from the Labour Party and Parliament on 25 July 1911 in protest at legislation on land ownership introduced by Secretary for Lands, Niels Nielson. As a result, Labour was left without a majority in the house and rather than face a vote of no confidence, the Ministry and Speaker resigned. This forced the House to be prorogued with the result that Macdonell was automatically expelled for non-attendance during an entire session. By the time of the subsequent by-elections, Labour policy had been reversed and Nielsen had left the ministry. Dunn rejoined the party and successfully re-contested the Mudgee by-election on 16 August 1911. Hoyle did not re-contest the Liverpool Plains by-election on 16 August 1911 which was won by Liberal candidate, John Perry by three votes on the same day. This result was overturned on appeal and at the second by-election on 28 October William Ashford (Labour) was successful.

== Dates ==
Date	Event
14 September 1911	Writ of election issued by the Speaker of the Legislative Assembly.
23 September 1911	Nominations
7 October 1911	Polling day
21 October 1911	Return of writ

== Result ==
1911 Cobar by-election 1 Saturday 23 September
Party	Candidate	Votes	%	±%
Labour	Donald Macdonell (re-elected)	unopposed		
Registered electors		7,806		
Labour hold				

== Aftermath ==
Donald Macdonell died three weeks later and Charles Fern (politician) (Labour) was unopposed at the December by-election.

== See also ==
- Electoral results for the district of Cobar
- List of New South Wales state by-elections
