= 1863 Liverpool Plains colonial by-election =

By-election in New South Wales, Australia

A by-election was held for the New South Wales Legislative Assembly electorate of Liverpool Plains on 7 April 1863 because of the resignation of Alexander Dick, to accept appointment as 2nd examiner of titles under the Real Property Act.

== Dates ==
Date	Event
31 December 1862	Alexander Dick resigned.
2 January 1863	Writ of election issued by the Speaker of the Legislative Assembly.
22 January 1863	Nominations at Tamworth
29 January 1863	Polling day
10 February 1863	Return of writ

== Polling places ==
- Tamworth
- Breeza
- Gunnedah
- Barraba
- Wallabadah
- Quirindi
- Nundle
- Doughboy Hollow
- Bowling Alley Point (Note: 12 km north of Nundle)
- Moonbi
- Veness's Inn
- Coipolly
- Carroll
- Grover's Inn

Polling was delayed at Carroll and Grover's Inn because the Namoi River was in flood, with polling taking place on 11 February.

== Result ==
1863 Liverpool Plains by-election Thursday 29 January
Candidate	Votes	%
Marshall Burdekin (elected)	319	53.5
William Mullen	277	46.5
Total formal votes	596	100.0
Informal votes	0	0.0
Turnout	596	37.5

== See also ==
- Electoral results for the district of Liverpool Plains
- List of New South Wales state by-elections
