= Electoral results for the district of Sydney-Gipps =

Election results for Sydney-Gipps, New South Wales, Australia

Sydney-Gipps, an electoral district of the Legislative Assembly in the Australian state of New South Wales, was created in 1894 and abolished in 1904.

| Election | Member | Party |
|---|---|---|
| 1894 | George Black | Independent Labour |
| 1895 | George Black | Labour |
| 1898 | Wilfred Spruson | National Federal |
| 1901 | William Daley | Labor |

== Election results ==
=== Elections in the 1900s ===
==== 1901 ====
1901 New South Wales state election: Sydney-Gipps
| Party | Candidate | Votes | % | ±% |
|---|---|---|---|---|
| Labour | William Daley | 981 | 53.5 | +4.5 |
| Ind. Progressive | Wilfred Spruson | 655 | 35.7 | −14.6 |
| Liberal Reform | Elliot Johnson | 197 | 10.8 | |
| Total formal votes | | 1,833 | 98.9 | −0.4 |
| Informal votes | | 21 | 1.1 | +0.4 |
| Turnout | | 1,854 | 64.4 | +4.8 |
| Labour gain from Progressive | | | | |

=== Elections in the 1890s ===
==== 1898 ====
1898 New South Wales colonial election: Sydney-Gipps
| Party | Candidate | Votes | % | ±% |
|---|---|---|---|---|
| National Federal | Wilfred Spruson | 747 | 50.4 | |
| Labour | George Black | 727 | 49.0 | |
| Independent Labor | Thomas Kohen | 9 | 0.6 | |
| Total formal votes | | 1,483 | 99.3 | |
| Informal votes | | 11 | 0.7 | |
| Turnout | | 1,494 | 59.6 | |
| National Federal gain from Labour | | | | |

==== 1895 ====
1895 New South Wales colonial election: Sydney-Gipps
| Party | Candidate | Votes | % | ±% |
|---|---|---|---|---|
| Labour | George Black | 750 | 57.5 | |
| Independent | Daniel O'Connor | 555 | 42.5 | |
| Total formal votes | | 1,305 | 99.4 | |
| Informal votes | | 8 | 0.6 | |
| Turnout | | 1,313 | 64.8 | |
| Member changed to Labour from Independent Labour | | | | |

==== 1894 ====
1894 New South Wales colonial election: Sydney-Gipps
| Party | Candidate | Votes | % | ±% |
|---|---|---|---|---|
| Independent Labour | George Black | 915 | 55.2 | |
| Free Trade | Daniel O'Connor | 742 | 44.8 | |
| Total formal votes | | 1,657 | 99.1 | |
| Informal votes | | 15 | 0.9 | |
| Turnout | | 1,672 | 78.4 | |
| Independent Labour win | | (new seat) | | |
