= 1860 Liverpool Plains colonial by-election =

By-election in New South Wales, Australia

A by-election was held for the New South Wales Legislative Assembly electorate of Liverpool Plains on 10 August 1860 because of the resignation of Andrew Loder.

== Dates ==
| Date | Event |
|---|---|
| 5 March 1860 | Andrew Loder resigned. |
| 7 March 1860 | Writ of election issued by the Speaker of the Legislative Assembly. |
| 29 March 1860 | Nominations |
| 10 April 1860 | Polling day |
| 27 April 1860 | Return of writ |

== Result ==
1860 Liverpool Plains by-election Tuesday 10 April
| Candidate | Votes | % |
|---|---|---|
| Charles Kemp (elected) | 164 | 55.6 |
| Thomas Dangar | 131 | 44.4 |
| Total formal votes | 295 | 100.0 |
| Informal votes | 0 | 0.0 |
| Turnout | 295 | 25.0 |

== See also ==
- Electoral results for the district of Liverpool Plains
- List of New South Wales state by-elections
