= 1871 Liverpool Plains colonial by-election =

By-election in New South Wales, Australia

A by-election was held for the New South Wales Legislative Assembly electorate of Liverpool Plains on 9 January 1871 because Charles Cowper had been appointed Agent General in London.

== Dates ==
Date	Event
6 December 1870	Cowper appointed Agent General.
7 December 1870	Writ of election issued by the Speaker of the Legislative Assembly.
27 December 1870	Nominations at Tamworth
9 January 1871	Polling day
31 January 1871	Return of writ

== Candidates ==
John Robertson was already a member of the Legislative Assembly, for the electorate West Sydney. At the nominations Hanley Bennett produced a telegram from Robertson stating that he would not oppose Lewis Levy and would not sit if elected.

== Polling places ==
- Tamworth
- Gunnedah
- Moonbi
- Nundle
- Bowling Alley Point (Note: 12 km north of Nundle)
- Barraba
- Manilla
- Black Creek
- The Rocks (Grover's)
- Wallabadah
- Tambar Springs
- Doughboy Hollow
- Breeza
- Quirindi

Polling was delayed at Breeza and Quirindi Inn because of floods and a mistake by a postmaster.

== Result ==
1871 Liverpool Plains by-election Monday 9 January
Candidate	Votes	%
Lewis Levy (elected)	374	61.8
Hanley Bennett	198	32.7
John Robertson	33	5.5
Total formal votes	605	100.0
Informal votes	0	0.0
Turnout	605	21.9

== See also ==
- Electoral results for the district of Liverpool Plains
- List of New South Wales state by-elections
