= August 1911 Liverpool Plains state by-election =

Election result for Liverpool Plains, New South Wales, Australia

A by-election was held for the New South Wales Legislative Assembly electorate of Liverpool Plains on 16 August 1911 because of the resignation of Henry Horne (Labor) because he disagreed with legislation introduced by the Labor Secretary for Lands Niels Nielsen.

The member for Mudgee Bill Dunn (Labor) also resigned, and the Mudgee by-election was held on the same day.

== Dates ==
Date	Event
25 July 1911	Henry Horne resigned.
26 July 1911	Writ of election issued by the Speaker of the Legislative Assembly.
2 August 1911	Nominations
16 August 1911	Polling day
2 September 1911	Return of writ

== Results ==
1911 Liverpool Plains by-election Wednesday 16 August
Party	Candidate	Votes	%	±%
Liberal Reform	John Perry	2,912	50.0	+9.8
Labor	William Ashford	2,909	50.0	−9.8
Total formal votes		5,821	98.5	+0.3
Informal votes		91	1.5	−0.3
Turnout		5,912	65.0 (Note: estimate based on an electoral roll of 9,100 at the 1910 election.)	
Liberal Reform gain from Labor				

== Aftermath ==
With a margin of 3 votes and 91 informal votes, William Ashford challenged the result before the Elections and Qualifications Committee, which declared the election void. William Ashford comfortably won the subsequent by-election.

== See also ==
- Electoral results for the district of Liverpool Plains
- List of New South Wales state by-elections
