= 1876 Liverpool Plains colonial by-election =

By-election in New South Wales, Australia

A by-election was held for the New South Wales Legislative Assembly electorate of Liverpool Plains on 5 June 1876 because Hanley Bennett was insolvent.

== Dates ==
| Date | Event |
|---|---|
| 23 March 1876 | Hanley Bennett was made bankrupt. |
| 3 May 1876 | Writ of election issued by the Speaker of the Legislative Assembly. |
| 22 May 1876 | Nominations |
| 5 June 1876 | Polling day |
| 26 June 1876 | Return of writ |

== Result ==
1876 Liverpool Plains by-election Monday 5 June
| Candidate | Votes | % |
|---|---|---|
| Hanley Bennett (re-elected) | 843 | 46.2 |
| Sydney Burdekin | 823 | 45.2 |
| William Gordon | 126 | 6.9 |
| George McLean | 30 | 1.6 |
| Total formal votes | 1,823 | 100.0 |
| Informal votes | 0 | 0.0 |
| Turnout | 1,823 | 44.0 |

== See also ==
- Electoral results for the district of Liverpool Plains
- List of New South Wales state by-elections
