= 1911 Cobar state by-election =

1911 Cobar state by-election may refer to:

- September 1911 Cobar state by-election, held on 23 September 1911
- December 1911 Cobar state by-election, held on 2 December 1911

== See also ==
- List of New South Wales state by-elections
