= 1910 New South Wales state election =

Colonial election for New South Wales, Australia in October 1910

← 1907	14 October 1910	1913 →

All 90 seats in the New South Wales Legislative Assembly 46 Assembly seats were needed for a majority
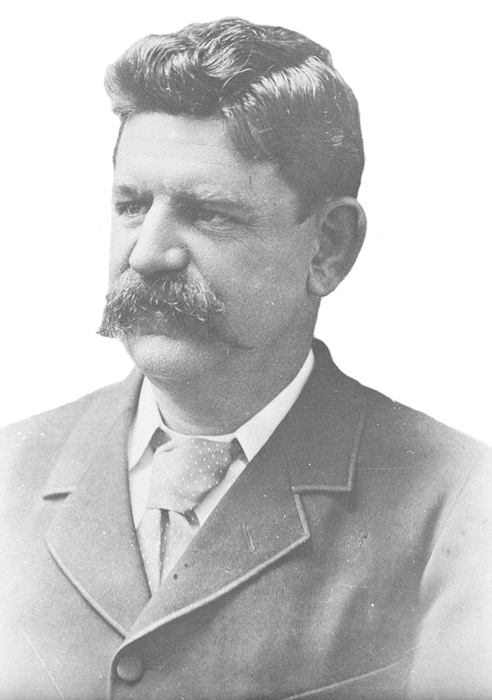

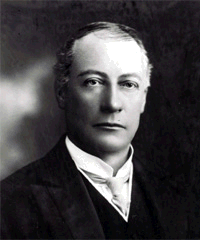
	First party	Second party
Leader	James McGowen	Charles Wade
Party	Labour	Liberal Reform
Leader since	August 1894	2 October 1907
Leader's seat	Redfern	Gordon
Last election	32 seats	45 seats
Seats won	46	37
Seat change	▲14	▼8
Percentage	48.92%	43.03
Swing	▲15.61	▼2.88
- Legislative Assembly after the election
Premier before election
Charles Wade
Liberal Reform
Subsequent Premier
James McGowen
Labour

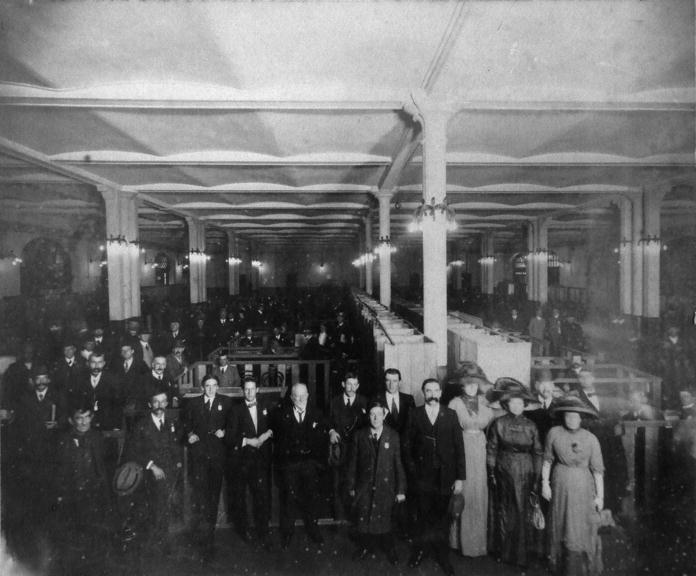
Men and women voters and polling booths, 1910.

The 1910 New South Wales state election was held on 14 October 1910 for all of the 90 seats in the 22nd New South Wales Legislative Assembly and it was conducted in single-member constituencies with a second ballot if a majority was not achieved on the first. Both adult males and females were entitled to vote, but not Indigenous people. The 21st parliament of New South Wales was dissolved on 14 September 1910 by the Governor, Lord Chelmsford, on the advice of the Premier Charles Wade.

This was the first NSW election using a second ballot system. All previous elections had used a first past the post voting system, where a candidate might be elected with less than 50% of the vote especially where two or more similar candidates split the vote. (Note: For example Leichhardt at the 1907 election where the Liberal vote was split between the endorsed candidate and an independent Liberal, with Labour taking the seat with 44.2% of the vote.) There were 3 districts that required a second ballot, at Durham and St Leonards where the second round ballot was won by the leading candidate and at Hastings and Macleay where support from the Labour Party saw the independent overtake the sitting Liberal Reform member to take the seat.

The election saw the Labour Electoral League form government for the first time, winning 46 of the 90 seats in the Assembly.

== Key dates ==
Date	Event
14 September 1910	The Legislative Assembly was dissolved, and writs were issued by the Governor to proceed with an election.
23 September 1910	Nominations for candidates for the election closed at noon.
14 October 1910	Polling day.
15 November 1910	Opening of 22nd Parliament.

== Results ==
New South Wales state election, 14 October 1910 Legislative Assembly << 1907–1913 >>
Enrolled voters	867,695				
Votes cast	572,500		Turnout	69.05	+2.33
Informal votes	10,514		Informal	1.80	−1.07
Summary of votes by party
Party	Primary votes	%	Swing	Seats	Change
Labour	280,056	48.92	+15.61	46	+14
Liberal Reform	246,360	43.03	−2.88	37	−8
Independent Liberal	33,529	5.86	+0.15	6	+2
Independent Labour	4,527	0.79	+0.79	0	0
Farmers and Settlers	4,039	0.71	+0.71	0	0
Independent	3,989	0.70	−9.45	1	−3
Former Progressive	0	0.00	−4.75	0	−5
Total	572,500			90	

Popular vote
Labour	48.92%
Liberal Reform	43.03%
Ind. Liberal	5.86%
Independent	0.70%
Others	1.49%
Parliamentary seats
Labour	46
Liberal Reform	37
Ind. Liberal	6
Independent	1

== Changing seats ==
Seats changing hands
Seat	1907			Swing (Note: Swing is calculated using the Butler method, being the average of the change in votes of the successful party in 1907 and the successful party in 1910. Where both parties did not contest both elections, the swing is N/A)	1910		
Seat	Party	Member	Margin (Note: Margin is calculated as the difference in vote percentage between the successful party and the second party.)	Swing	Margin	Member	Party
Belmore	Former Progressive	Edward O'Sullivan (Note: Edward O'Sullivan had won Belmore at the 1907 election as a Former Progressive, however he joined the Labor Party in 1909 and died in April 1910. The by-election in May 1910 was won by Patrick Minahan (Labor) who retained the seat at the 1910 general election.)	39.4	N/A	1.4	Patrick Minahan	Labour
Bingara	Liberal Reform	Samuel Moore	23.8	12.2	0.6	George McDonald	Labour
Darling Harbour	Independent	John Norton (Note: John Norton had won Darling Harbour at the 1907 election, however he resigned to stand as a Senator for NSW at the 1910 federal election. The by-election in April 1910 was won by John Cochran (Labour) who retained the seat at the 1910 general election.)	11.1	N/A	30.8	John Cochran	Labour
The Glebe	Liberal Reform	James Hogue	7.8	N/A	1.6	Tom Keegan	Labour
Hastings and Macleay	Liberal Reform	Robert Davidson	7.0	N/A	9.8	Henry Morton	Independent
King	Liberal Reform	Ernest Broughton (Note: Did not stand for re-election)	2.8	12.7	9.9	James Morrish	Labour
The Macquarie	Liberal Reform	Charles Barton	1.0	6.5	5.5	Thomas Thrower	Labour
Marrickville	Liberal Reform	Richard McCoy	29.1	40.1	11.0	Thomas Crawford	Labour
Mudgee	Liberal Reform	Robert Jones	11.1	17.6	6.4	Bill Dunn	Labour
The Namoi	Independent Liberal	Albert Collins	7.8	N/A	20.6	George Black	Labour
Newcastle	Liberal Reform	Owen Gilbert	14.8	24.5	9.8	Arthur Gardiner	Labour
Paddington	Liberal Reform	Charles Oakes	13.1	17.3	4.2	John Osborne	Labour
Queanbeyan	Liberal Reform	Granville Ryrie (Note: Granville Ryrie had won Queanbeyan at the 1907 election, however he resigned to contest the seat of Werriwa at the 1910 federal election. The by-election in April 1910 was won by John Cusack (Labour) who retained the seat at the 1910 general election.)	13.6	13.6	2.0	John Cusack	Labour
St Leonards	Independent	Edward Clark (Note: Edward Clark was defeated in the first round of voting)	28.6	N/A	14.6	Arthur Cocks	Liberal Reform
Surry Hills	Liberal Reform	Sir James Graham	23.4	23.4	21.4	Henry Hoyle	Labour
Members changing party
Seat	1907			Swing	1910		
Seat	Party	Member	Margin	Swing	Margin	Member	Party
Albury	Former Progressive	Gordon McLaurin	23.0	-6.0	11.0	Gordon McLaurin	Independent Liberal
Canterbury	Independent Liberal	Varney Parkes	15.5	+12.7	11.4	Varney Parkes	Liberal Reform
Durham	Independent Liberal	William Brown	1.2	-0.1	1.0	William Brown	Liberal Reform
Gloucester	Independent	Richard Price	8.3	+12.6	37.8	Richard Price	Liberal Reform
Maitland	Liberal Reform	John Gillies	65.4	-18.8	27.8	John Gillies	Independent Liberal
Phillip	Independent	Richard Meagher	13.9	+33.5	53.2	Richard Meagher	Labour
Raleigh	Former Progressive	George Briner	37.1	+14.0	56.6	George Briner	Independent Liberal
Randwick	Liberal Reform	David Storey	52.0	-16.6	18.8	David Storey	Independent Liberal
Tamworth	Former Progressive	Robert Levien	23.5	+0.9	21.8	Robert Levien	Independent Liberal
Waverley	Independent Liberal	James Macarthur-Onslow	7.5	+4.0	14.9	James Macarthur-Onslow	Liberal Reform
Wynyard	Former Progressive	Robert Donaldson	15.6	-6.8	2.0	Robert Donaldson	Independent Liberal

The Upper Hunter had been won by William Fleming (Liberal Reform) at the 1907 election, however he resigned to contest the seat of New England at the 1910 federal election. The by-election in April 1910 was won by William Ashford (Labour) however Henry Willis regained the seat for Liberal Reform at the general election.

== See also ==
- Candidates of the 1910 New South Wales state election
- Members of the New South Wales Legislative Assembly, 1910–1913
