= 1870 Liverpool Plains colonial by-election =

By-election in New South Wales, Australia

A by-election was held for the New South Wales Legislative Assembly electorate of Liverpool Plains on 29 January 1870 because Charles Cowper had been appointed Premier and Colonial Secretary, forming the fifth Cowper ministry.

== Dates ==
Date	Event
13 January 1870	Cowper appointed Colonial Secretary.
13 January 1870	Writ of election issued by the Governor. (Note: Ordinarily the writ for a by-election would be issued by the Speaker of the Legislative Assembly, however Cowper was appointed before Parliament convened and the writ was issued by the Governor.)
21 January 1870	Nominations.
29 January 1870	Polling day
5 February 1870	Return of writ

== Result ==
1870 Liverpool Plains by-election Saturday 29 January
Candidate	Votes	%
Charles Cowper (re-elected)	721	85.6
Edward Parnell	120	14.3
Joseph Abbott	1	0.1
Total formal votes	842	100.0
Informal votes	0	0.0
Turnout	842	35.6

== See also ==
- Electoral results for the district of Liverpool Plains
- List of New South Wales state by-elections
