= Results of the 1910 New South Wales state election =

State election for New South Wales, Australia in October 1910

New South Wales state election, 14 October 1910 Legislative Assembly << 1907–1913 >>
Enrolled voters	867,695				
Votes cast	572,500		Turnout	69.05	+2.33
Informal votes	10,514		Informal	1.80	−1.07
Summary of votes by party
Party	Primary votes	%	Swing	Seats	Change
Labour	280,056	48.92	+15.61	46	+14
Liberal Reform	246,360	43.03	−2.88	37	−8
Independent Liberal	33,529	5.86	+0.15	6	+2
Independent Labour	4,527	0.79	+0.79	0	0
Farmers and Settlers	4,039	0.71	+0.71	0	0
Independent	3,989	0.70	−9.45	1	−3
Former Progressive	0	0.00	−4.75	0	−5
Total	572,500			90	

The 1910 New South Wales state election involved 90 electoral district returning one member each.

This was the first NSW election using a second ballot system. All previous elections had used a first past the post voting system, where a candidate might be elected with less than 50% of the vote especially where two or more similar candidates split the vote. (Note: For example Leichhardt at the 1907 election where the Liberal vote was split between the endorsed candidate and an independent Liberal, with Labour taking the seat with 44.16% of the vote.) Under the second ballot system, if a candidate failed to achieve at least 50% of the vote in an electorate, a run-off election would take place in the following weeks. In this election, 3 electorates proceeded to second round elections. At Durham and St Leonards the second round ballot was won by the leading candidate; however, at Hastings and Macleay the support from the Labour Party saw the independent overtake sitting Liberal Reform member to take the seat. The Labour Party fielded a candidate in every electorate, with the result that the only 3 uncontested seats, Broken Hill, Cobar and The Murray, were all held by the Labour Party.

There were 15 seats that elected a member from a different party and a further 11 seats where the member retained the seat but changed party. For a comprehensive list, see 1910 New South Wales state election § Changing seats.

The election saw the final demise of the Progressive Party, with the four surviving members, Gordon McLaurin (Albury), George Briner (Raleigh), Robert Levien (Tamworth) and Robert Donaldson (Wynyard) retaining their seats having campaigned as Independent Liberals. (Note: Edward O'Sullivan (Belmore) joined the Labour Party in 1909 and died in April 1910.)

== Election results ==
=== Albury ===
1910 New South Wales state election: Albury
Party	Candidate	Votes	%	±%
Independent Liberal	Gordon McLaurin	2,786	55.5	−6.0
Labour	Benjamin Lloyd	2,234	44.5	+6.0
Total formal votes		5,020	98.4	+2.0
Informal votes		82	1.6	−2.0
Turnout		5,102	69.2	+8.4
Member changed to Independent Liberal from Progressive (defunct)		Swing	−6.0	

=== Alexandria ===
1910 New South Wales state election: Alexandria
Party	Candidate	Votes	%	±%
Labour	John Dacey	4,225	68.7	+13.7
Liberal Reform	George Smith	1,897	30.9	−11.9
Independent	James Horne	25	0.4	
Total formal votes		6,147	97.1	−0.6
Informal votes		186	2.9	+0.6
Turnout		6,333	65.2	−6.6
Labour hold		Swing	+13.7	

=== Allowrie ===
1910 New South Wales state election: Allowrie
Party	Candidate	Votes	%	±%
Liberal Reform	Mark Morton	3,298	64.4	
Labour	Charles Craig	1,825	35.6	
Total formal votes		5,123	97.4	
Informal votes		135	2.6	
Turnout		5,258	75.0	
Liberal Reform hold				

=== Annandale ===
1910 New South Wales state election: Annandale
Party	Candidate	Votes	%	±%
Liberal Reform	Albert Bruntnell	4,321	51.2	
Labour	George Davidson	4,121	48.8	
Total formal votes		8,442	98.2	
Informal votes		157	1.8	
Turnout		8,599	72.5	
Liberal Reform hold				

=== Armidale ===
1910 New South Wales state election: Armidale
Party	Candidate	Votes	%	±%
Liberal Reform	Edmund Lonsdale	3,407	51.3	
Labour	Francis Bryant	3,232	48.7	
Total formal votes		6,639	98.3	
Informal votes		116	1.7	
Turnout		6,755	73.9	
Liberal Reform hold				

=== Ashburnham ===
1910 New South Wales state election: Ashburnham
Party	Candidate	Votes	%	±%
Labour	John Lynch	3,349	53.4	
Liberal Reform	Reginald Weaver	2,917	46.6	
Total formal votes		6,266	98.2	
Informal votes		118	1.8	
Turnout		6,384	75.8	
Labour hold				

=== Ashfield ===
1910 New South Wales state election: Ashfield
Party	Candidate	Votes	%	±%
Liberal Reform	William Robson	5,800	66.3	
Labour	George Davidson	2,943	33.7	
Total formal votes		8,743	98.6	
Informal votes		128	1.4	
Turnout		8,871	71.8	
Liberal Reform hold				

=== Balmain ===
1910 New South Wales state election: Balmain
Party	Candidate	Votes	%	±%
Labour	John Storey	3,927	58.2	
Liberal Reform	John Hurley	2,815	41.8	
Total formal votes		6,742	99.3	
Informal votes		50	0.7	
Turnout		6,792	76.7	
Labour hold				

=== Bathurst ===
1910 New South Wales state election: Bathurst
Party	Candidate	Votes	%	±%
Liberal Reform	John Miller	3,013	53.0	
Labour	Joseph Coates	2,670	47.0	
Total formal votes		5,683	98.2	
Informal votes		102	1.8	
Turnout		5,785	70.6	
Liberal Reform hold				

=== Bega ===
1910 New South Wales state election: Bega
Party	Candidate	Votes	%	±%
Liberal Reform	William Wood	3,449	56.8	
Labour	Francis Riley	2,626	43.2	
Total formal votes		6,075	99.0	
Informal votes		61	1.0	
Turnout		6,136	77.6	
Liberal Reform hold				

=== Belmore ===
1910 New South Wales state election: Belmore
Party	Candidate	Votes	%	±%
Labour	Patrick Minahan	2,656	50.7	
Independent Labour	John English	2,587	49.3	
Total formal votes		5,243	97.4	−0.9
Informal votes		142	2.6	+0.9
Turnout		5,385	62.1	−0.2
Labour gain from Progressive Party (defunct)				

- Edward O'Sullivan had won Belmore at the 1907 election as a Former Progressive; however, he joined the Labour Party in 1909 and died in April 1910. The by-election in May 1910 was won by Patrick Minahan (Labour) who retained the seat at the 1910 general election.

=== Belubula ===
1910 New South Wales state election: Belubula
Party	Candidate	Votes	%	±%
Liberal Reform	Thomas Waddell	3,414	56.6	
Labour	Cornelius Danahey	2,619	43.4	
Total formal votes		6,033	97.7	
Informal votes		140	2.3	
Turnout		6,173	67.0	
Liberal Reform hold				

=== Bingara ===
1910 New South Wales state election: Bingara
Party	Candidate	Votes	%	±%
Labour	George McDonald	3,037	50.3	+12.3
Liberal Reform	Samuel Moore (defeated)	2,997	49.7	−12.2
Total formal votes		6,034	98.4	+1.5
Informal votes		98	1.6	−1.5
Turnout		6,132	64.2	+4.4
Labour gain from Liberal Reform				

=== Blayney ===
1910 New South Wales state election: Blayney
Party	Candidate	Votes	%	±%
Labour	George Beeby	7,799	55.0	
Liberal Reform	William Kelk	2,292	45.0	
Total formal votes		5,091	98.8	
Informal votes		61	1.2	
Turnout		5,152	71.5	
Labour hold				

=== Botany ===
1910 New South Wales state election: Botany
Party	Candidate	Votes	%	±%
Labour	Fred Page	4,547	64.0	
Liberal Reform	George Howe	2,558	36.0	
Total formal votes		7,105	98.9	
Informal votes		82	1.1	
Turnout		7,187	68.6	
Labour hold				

=== Broken Hill ===
1910 New South Wales state election: Broken Hill
Party	Candidate	Votes	%	±%
Labour	John Cann	Unopposed		
Labour hold				

=== Burrangong ===
1910 New South Wales state election: Burrangong
Party	Candidate	Votes	%	±%
Labour	George Burgess	3,655	54.1	
Liberal Reform	James Carroll	3,103	45.9	
Total formal votes		6,758	98.2	
Informal votes		126	1.8	
Turnout		6,884	70.3	
Labour hold				

=== Burwood ===
1910 New South Wales state election: Burwood
Party	Candidate	Votes	%	±%
Liberal Reform	Thomas Henley	5,563	62.6	
Labour	Thomas Tytherleigh	3,325	37.4	
Total formal votes		8,888	98.5	
Informal votes		139	1.5	
Turnout		9,027	74.8	
Liberal Reform hold				

=== Camden ===
1910 New South Wales state election: Camden
Party	Candidate	Votes	%	±%
Liberal Reform	Fred Downes	3,591	67.4	
Labour	Frederick Webster	1,737	32.6	
Total formal votes		5,328	97.9	
Informal votes		61	1.1	
Turnout		5,389	71.4	
Liberal Reform hold				

=== Camperdown ===
1910 New South Wales state election: Camperdown
Party	Candidate	Votes	%	±%
Labour	Robert Stuart-Robertson	4,361	63.4	
Liberal Reform	Thomas Jessep	2,518	32.6	
Total formal votes		6,879	98.0	
Informal votes		140	2.0	
Turnout		7,019	68.3	
Labour hold				

=== Canterbury ===
1910 New South Wales state election: Canterbury
Party	Candidate	Votes	%	±%
Liberal Reform	Varney Parkes	5,824	55.7	+12.7
Labour	Ernest Burgess	4,6221	44.3	+16.8
Independent	John Gager	17	0.2	
Total formal votes		10,463	97.8	+0.7
Informal votes		236	2.2	−0.7
Turnout		10,699	71.5	−2.2
Member changed to Liberal Reform from Independent Liberal				

=== The Castlereagh ===
1910 New South Wales state election: The Castlereagh
Party	Candidate	Votes	%	±%
Labour	John Treflé	3,410	58.4	
Liberal Reform	William Donnelly	2,434	41.6	
Total formal votes		5,844	98.0	
Informal votes		121	2.0	
Turnout		5,565	61.7	
Labour hold				

=== The Clarence ===
1910 New South Wales state election: The Clarence
Party	Candidate	Votes	%	±%
Liberal Reform	John McFarlane	3,586	66.0	
Labour	William Cahill	1,850	34.0	
Total formal votes		5,436	98.2	
Informal votes		100	1.8	
Turnout		5,536	63.5	
Liberal Reform hold				

=== The Clyde ===
1910 New South Wales state election: The Clyde
Party	Candidate	Votes	%	±%
Liberal Reform	William Millard	2,382	59.3	
Labour	William Tomkins	1,624	40.4	
Independent	Samuel Rose	9	0.2	
Total formal votes		4,015	96.9	
Informal votes		126	3.0	
Turnout		4,141	74.8	
Liberal Reform hold				

=== Cobar ===
1910 New South Wales state election: Cobar
Party	Candidate	Votes	%	±%
Labour	Donald Macdonell	unopposed		
Labour hold				

=== Cootamundra ===
1910 New South Wales state election: Cootamundra
Party	Candidate	Votes	%	±%
Labour	William Holman	3,551	51.7	
Liberal Reform	Granville Ryrie	3,316	48.3	
Total formal votes		6,867	99.1	
Informal votes		61	0.9	
Turnout		6,928	71.9	
Labour hold				

=== Corowa ===
1910 New South Wales state election: Corowa
Party	Candidate	Votes	%	±%
Liberal Reform	Richard Ball	3,869	61.5	
Labour	John Grant	2,423	38.5	
Total formal votes		6,292	98.7	
Informal votes		81	1.3	
Turnout		6,373	70.4	
Liberal Reform hold				

=== The Darling ===
1910 New South Wales state election: The Darling
Party	Candidate	Votes	%	±%
Labour	John Meehan	1,866	78.4	
Liberal Reform	William Shepherd	515	21.6	
Total formal votes		2,381	97.3	
Informal votes		66	2.70	
Turnout		2,447	48.4	
Labour hold				

=== Darling Harbour ===
1910 New South Wales state election: Darling Harbour
Party	Candidate	Votes	%	±%
Labour	John Cochran	2,998	65.4	+22.7
Independent Labour	Andrew Thomson	1,586	34.6	
Total formal votes		4,584	96.1	−0.6
Informal votes		187	3.9	+0.6
Turnout		4,771	59.7	−7.2
Labour gain from Independent				

- John Norton (Independent) had won the 1907 election for Darling Harbour; however, he resigned to stand as a Senator for NSW at the 1910 federal election. The by-election in April 1910 was won by John Cochran (Labour) who retained the seat at this election.

=== Darlinghurst ===
1910 New South Wales state election: Darlinghurst
Party	Candidate	Votes	%	±%
Liberal Reform	Daniel Levy	3,556	52.9	
Labour	Jack FitzGerald	3,043	45.2	
Independent	John Haynes	128	1.9	
Total formal votes		6,727	97.9	
Informal votes		144	2.1	
Turnout		6,871	65.0	
Liberal Reform hold				

=== Deniliquin ===
1910 New South Wales state election: Deniliquin
Party	Candidate	Votes	%	±%
Labour	Henry Peters	2,282	59.3	
Farmers and Settlers	Arthur Trethowan	1,566	40.7	
Total formal votes		3,848	98.5	
Informal votes		60	1.5	
Turnout		3,908	58.9	
Labour hold				

=== Durham ===
1910 New South Wales state election: Durham
Party	Candidate	Votes	%	±%
Liberal Reform	William Brown	2,726	48.3	−2.3
Independent Liberal	Walter Bennett	2,155	38.2	−11.2
Labour	Robert Elkin	763	13.5	
Total formal votes		5,644	98.2	+0.6
Informal votes		106	1.8	−0.6
Turnout		7,750	71.4	+2.9

1910 New South Wales state election: Durham - Second Round
Party	Candidate	Votes	%	±%
Liberal Reform	William Brown	3,169	50.5	−0.1
Independent Liberal	Walter Bennett	3,106	49.5	+0.1
Total formal votes		6,275	99.0	+1.4
Informal votes		64	1.0	−1.4
Turnout		6,339	78.7	+10.2
Member changed to Liberal Reform from Independent Liberal				

=== The Glebe ===
1910 New South Wales state election: The Glebe
Party	Candidate	Votes	%	±%
Labour	Tom Keegan	4,251	50.8	
Liberal Reform	James Hogue (defeated)	4,115	49.2	
Total formal votes		8,366	98.6	
Informal votes		113	1.3	
Turnout		8,479	74.1	
Labour gain from Liberal Reform				

=== Gloucester ===
1910 New South Wales state election: Gloucester
Party	Candidate	Votes	%	±%
Liberal Reform	Richard Price	4,608	65.3	+12.6
Labour	Con Hogan	1,943	27.5	
Independent	James Gregg	506	7.2	
Total formal votes		7,057	97.0	−0.1
Informal votes		222	3.0	+0.1
Turnout		7,279	65.9	−7.1
Member changed to Liberal Reform from Independent				

=== Gordon ===
1910 New South Wales state election: Gordon
Party	Candidate	Votes	%	±%
Liberal Reform	Charles Wade	6,497	71.2	
Labour	Conrad Von Hagen	2,624	28.8	
Total formal votes		9,121	98.2	
Informal votes		168	1.8	
Turnout		9,289	74.6	
Liberal Reform hold				

=== Gough ===
1910 New South Wales state election: Gough
Party	Candidate	Votes	%	±%
Liberal Reform	Follett Thomas	3,485	50.8	
Labour	Henry Colditz	3,381	49.2	
Total formal votes		6,866	98.5	
Informal votes		106	1.5	
Turnout		6,972	73.9	
Liberal Reform hold				

=== Goulburn ===
1910 New South Wales state election: Goulburn
Party	Candidate	Votes	%	±%
Liberal Reform	Augustus James	3,467	57.7	
Labour	Percy Hollis	2,542	42.3	
Total formal votes		6,009	99.2	
Informal votes		49	0.8	
Turnout		6,058	72.6	
Liberal Reform hold				

=== Granville ===
1910 New South Wales state election: Granville
Party	Candidate	Votes	%	±%
Liberal Reform	John Nobbs	4,537	58.9	
Labour	Francis McLean	3,170	41.1	
Total formal votes		7,707	98.2	
Informal votes		143	1.8	
Turnout		7,850	71.8	
Liberal Reform hold				

=== The Gwydir ===
1910 New South Wales state election: The Gwydir
Party	Candidate	Votes	%	±%
Labour	George Jones	2,634	63.0	
Liberal Reform	Edward Spear	1,547	37.0	
Total formal votes		4,181	96.8	
Informal votes		138	3.2	
Turnout		4,319	46.6	
Labour hold				

=== Hartley ===
1910 New South Wales state election: Hartley
Party	Candidate	Votes	%	±%
Labour	James Dooley	5,646	65.7	
Liberal Reform	Sydney Innes-Noad	2,993	34.6	
Total formal votes		8,639	98.0	
Informal votes		177	2.0	
Turnout		8,816	67.9	
Labour hold				

=== The Hastings and The Macleay ===
1910 New South Wales state election: The Hastings and The Macleay
Party	Candidate	Votes	%	±%
Liberal Reform	Robert Davidson	2,661	45.1	−4.3
Independent	Henry Morton	2,117	35.9	
Labour	Hugh Bridson	1,120	19.0	
Total formal votes		5,898	97.8	+1.0
Informal votes		130	2.2	−1.0
Turnout		6,028	73.4	+6.8

1910 New South Wales state election: Hastings and Macleay - Second Round
Party	Candidate	Votes	%	±%
Independent	Henry Morton	3,467	54.9	
Liberal Reform	Robert Davidson (defeated)	2,849	45.1	−4.3
Total formal votes		6,316	99.1	+2.3
Informal votes		57	0.9	−2.3
Turnout		6,373	77.6	+11.0
Independent gain from Liberal Reform				

=== The Hawkesbury ===
1910 New South Wales state election: The Hawkesbury
Party	Candidate	Votes	%	±%
Liberal Reform	Brinsley Hall	4,041	69.6	
Labour	Albert Jones	1,766	30.4	
Total formal votes		5,807	98.3	
Informal votes		98	1.7	
Turnout		5,905	66.4	
Liberal Reform hold				

=== Kahibah ===
1910 New South Wales state election: Kahibah
Party	Candidate	Votes	%	±%
Labour	Alfred Edden	4,159	84.6	
Liberal Reform	Walter Clutton	760	15.4	
Total formal votes		4,919	98.1	
Informal votes		98	1.9	
Turnout		5,017	65.6	
Labour hold				

=== King ===
1910 New South Wales state election: King
Party	Candidate	Votes	%	±%
Labour	James Morrish	3,133	54.6	+6.0
Liberal Reform	Neville Mayman	2,566	44.7	−6.7
Independent	Robert Roberts	17	0.3	
Independent	James Jones	10	0.2	
Independent	Philip Cullen	5	0.1	
Independent	Michael Egan	5	0.1	
Total formal votes		5,736	97.5	−0.1
Informal votes		145	2.5	+0.1
Turnout		5,881	62.5	0.0
Labour gain from Liberal Reform				

=== The Lachlan ===
1910 New South Wales state election: The Lachlan
Party	Candidate	Votes	%	±%
Labour	Andrew Kelly	3,050	52.9	
Liberal Reform	William Ewers	2,717	47.1	
Total formal votes		5,766	98.7	
Informal votes		77	1.3	
Turnout		5,843	66.0	
Labour hold				

=== Lane Cove ===
1910 New South Wales state election: Lane Cove
Party	Candidate	Votes	%	±%
Liberal Reform	David Fell	5,385	61.0	
Labour	Sydney Hutton	3,444	39.0	
Total formal votes		8,829	99.3	
Informal votes		67	0.7	
Turnout		8,896	68.7	
Liberal Reform hold				

=== Leichhardt ===
1910 New South Wales state election: Leichhardt
Party	Candidate	Votes	%	±%
Labour	Campbell Carmichael	5,462	55.9	
Liberal Reform	Frederick Reed	4,305	44.1	
Total formal votes		9,967	99.1	
Informal votes		91	0.9	
Turnout		9,858	78.5	
Labour hold				

=== Liverpool Plains ===
1910 New South Wales state election: Liverpool Plains
Party	Candidate	Votes	%	±%
Labour	Henry Horne	3,265	56.9	
Farmers and Settlers	Robert Patten	2,473	43.1	
Total formal votes		5,738	97.9	
Informal votes		122	2.1	
Turnout		5,860	64.4	
Labour hold				

=== The Macquarie ===
1910 New South Wales state election: The Macquarie
Party	Candidate	Votes	%	±%
Labour	Thomas Thrower	3,698	52.8	+3.3
Liberal Reform	James Burns	3,311	47.2	−3.3
Total formal votes		7,009	98.3	+0.3
Informal votes		121	1.7	−0.3
Turnout		7,130	70.3	−2.9
Labour gain from Liberal Reform				

=== Maitland ===
1910 New South Wales state election: Maitland
Party	Candidate	Votes	%	±%
Independent Liberal	John Gillies	3,708	63.9	−18.8
Labour	Laurence Vial	2,091	36.1	+18.8
Total formal votes		5,799	98.2	+3.2
Informal votes		109	1.8	−3.2
Turnout		5,908	69.9	+10.8
Member changed to Independent Liberal from Liberal Reform				

=== Marrickville ===
1910 New South Wales state election: Marrickville
Party	Candidate	Votes	%	±%
Labour	Thomas Crawford	4,720	52.2	+16.7
Liberal Reform	Rupert McCoy	3,730	41.2	−23.4
Independent Liberal	Arthur Blackwood	577	6.4	
Independent	Tedbar Barden	17	0.2	
Total formal votes		9,044	98.6	+0.6
Informal votes		132	1.4	−0.6
Turnout		9,176	75.1	+8.4
Labour gain from Liberal Reform				

=== Middle Harbour ===
1910 New South Wales state election: Middle Harbour
Party	Candidate	Votes	%	±%
Liberal Reform	Richard Arthur	7,554	68.7	
Labour	Stephen O'Brien	2,793	25.4	
Independent Liberal	David Middleton	647	5.9	
Total formal votes		10,994	98.7	
Informal votes		150	1.3	
Turnout		11,144	68.2	
Liberal Reform hold				

=== Monaro ===
1910 New South Wales state election: Monaro
Party	Candidate	Votes	%	±%
Labour	Gus Miller	3,565	66.2	
Liberal Reform	William Wright	1,205	33.8	
Total formal votes		3,655	97.5	
Informal votes		90	2.5	
Turnout		3,655	57.5	
Labour hold				

=== Mudgee ===
1910 New South Wales state election: Mudgee
Party	Candidate	Votes	%	±%
Labour	Bill Dunn	3,476	53.2	+10.6
Liberal Reform	Robert Jones (defeated)	3,052	46.8	−6.9
Total formal votes		6,528	99.0	+1.7
Informal votes		69	1.0	−1.7
Turnout		6,597	78.0	+4.8
Labour gain from Liberal Reform				

=== The Murray ===
1910 New South Wales state election: The Murray
Party	Candidate	Votes	%	±%
Labour	Robert Scobie	Unopposed		
Labour hold				

=== The Murrumbidgee ===
1910 New South Wales state election: The Murrumbidgee
Party	Candidate	Votes	%	±%
Labour	Patrick McGarry	4,326	51.4	
Liberal Reform	John Fletcher	4,091	48.6	
Total formal votes		8,417	98.0	
Informal votes		175	2.0	
Turnout		8,592	67.9	
Labour hold				

=== The Namoi ===
1910 New South Wales state election: The Namoi
Party	Candidate	Votes	%	±%
Labour	George Black	3,267	60.3	+14.2
Independent Liberal	Hubert O'Reilly	2,153	39.7	
Total formal votes		5,420	97.1	+0.2
Informal votes		160	2.9	−0.2
Turnout		5,580	54.8	−11.1
Labour gain from Independent Liberal				

=== Newcastle ===
1910 New South Wales state election: Newcastle
Party	Candidate	Votes	%	±%
Labour	Arthur Gardiner	3,203	54.9	+12.3
Liberal Reform	Owen Gilbert (defeated)	2,635	45.1	−12.3
Total formal votes		5,836	98.7	+1.8
Informal votes		79	1.3	−1.8
Turnout		5,917	75.0	+3.1
Labour gain from Liberal Reform				

=== Newtown ===
1910 New South Wales state election: Newtown
Party	Candidate	Votes	%	±%
Labour	Robert Hollis	4,221	62.7	
Liberal Reform	William Ferguson	2,492	37.0	
Independent	Patrick Quinn	22	0.3	
Total formal votes		6,735	97.4	
Informal votes		177	2.6	
Turnout		6,912	67.6	
Labour hold				

=== Northumberland ===
1910 New South Wales state election: Northumberland
Party	Candidate	Votes	%	±%
Labour	William Kearsley	7,389	79.1	
Independent Liberal	Reginald Harris	1,957	20.9	
Total formal votes		9,346	97.6	
Informal votes		228	2.4	
Turnout		9,574	56.9	
Labour hold				

=== Orange ===
1910 New South Wales state election: Orange
Party	Candidate	Votes	%	±%
Liberal Reform	John Fitzpatrick	3,358	53.7	
Labour	Greg McGirr	2,895	46.3	
Total formal votes		6,253	98.6	
Informal votes		89	1.4	
Turnout		6,342	73.0	
Liberal Reform hold				

=== Paddington ===
1910 New South Wales state election: Paddington
Party	Candidate	Votes	%	±%
Labour	John Osborne	3,783	50.8	+7.5
Liberal Reform	Charles Oakes (defeated)	3,472	46.6	−9.8
Independent Liberal	Francis Meacle	192	2.6	
Total formal votes		8,236	98.8	+0.8
Informal votes		89	1.2	−0.8
Turnout		7,536	70.3	+12.7
Labour gain from Liberal Reform				

=== Parramatta ===
1910 New South Wales state election: Parramatta
Party	Candidate	Votes	%	±%
Liberal Reform	Tom Moxham	3,988	55.7	
Labour	Dowell O'Reilly	3,166	44.3	
Total formal votes		7,154	98.1	
Informal votes		142	1.9	
Turnout		7,296	76.8	

=== Petersham ===
1910 New South Wales state election: Petersham
Party	Candidate	Votes	%	±%
Liberal Reform	John Cohen	4,911	63.1	
Labour	Adamson Dawson	2,866	36.9	
Total formal votes		7,777	99.0	
Informal votes		82	1.0	
Turnout		7,859	71.7	
Liberal Reform hold				

=== Phillip ===
1910 New South Wales state election: Phillip
Party	Candidate	Votes	%	±%
Labour	Richard Meagher	4,108	76.1	+33.5
Liberal Reform	Henry Manning	1,236	22.9	−5.8
Independent	William Leonard	51	0.9	
Total formal votes		5,395	97.1	+0.2
Informal votes		163	2.9	+0.2
Turnout		5,558	65.6	−6.9
Member changed to Labour from Independent				

=== Pyrmont ===
1910 New South Wales state election: Pyrmont
Party	Candidate	Votes	%	±%
Labour	John McNeill	3,179	76.2	
Liberal Reform	John Sutton	639	15.3	
Social Democrat	William McCristal	354	8.5	
Total formal votes		4,179	97.2	
Informal votes		122	2.8	
Turnout		4,294	60.4	
Labour hold				

=== Queanbeyan ===
1910 New South Wales state election: Queanbeyan
Party	Candidate	Votes	%	±%
Labour	John Cusack	2,522	51.0	+6.9
Liberal Reform	Joseph Roberts	2,424	49.0	−6.7
Total formal votes		4,946	97.6	+0.2
Informal votes		120	2.4	−0.2
Turnout		5,066	75.3	−3.6
Labour gain from Liberal Reform				

- Granville Ryrie had won Queanbeyan at the 1907 election; however, he resigned to contest the seat of Werriwa at the 1910 federal election. The by-election in April 1910 was won by John Cusack (Labour) who retained the seat at the 1910 general election.

=== Raleigh ===
1910 New South Wales state election: Raleigh
Party	Candidate	Votes	%	±%
Independent Liberal	George Briner	4,981	78.3	+14.0
Labour	Clem Johnson	1,382	21.7	+13.1
Total formal votes		6,363	96.9	+2.3
Informal votes		204	3.1	−2.3
Turnout		6,567	61.4	+5.5
Member changed to Independent Liberal from Progressive (defunct)				

=== Randwick ===
1910 New South Wales state election: Randwick
Party	Candidate	Votes	%	±%
Independent Liberal	David Storey	4,998	59.4	−16.6
Labour	William Brown	3,413	40.6	+16.6
Total formal votes		8,411	98.1	+1.6
Informal votes		162	1.9	−1.6
Turnout		8,573	67.4	+16.0
Member changed to Independent Liberal from Liberal Reform				

=== Redfern ===
1910 New South Wales state election: Redfern
Party	Candidate	Votes	%	±%
Labour	James McGowen	4,411	70.3	
Liberal Reform	John Fegan	1,866	29.7	
Total formal votes		6,277	97.3	
Informal votes		175	2.7	
Turnout		6,452	68.3	
Labour hold				

=== The Richmond ===
1910 New South Wales state election: The Richmond
Party	Candidate	Votes	%	±%
Liberal Reform	John Perry	3,687	60.9	
Labour	William Gillies	2,366	39.1	
Total formal votes		6,053	97.2	
Informal votes		172	2.8	
Turnout		6,225	72.0	
Liberal Reform hold				

=== Rous ===
1910 New South Wales state election: Rous
Party	Candidate	Votes	%	±%
Liberal Reform	George Hindmarsh	4,744	56.1	
Labour	Alfred Taylor	3,719	43.9	
Total formal votes		8,463	98.7	
Informal votes		111	1.3	
Turnout		8,574	68.3	
Liberal Reform hold				

=== Rozelle ===
1910 New South Wales state election: Rozelle
Party	Candidate	Votes	%	±%
Labour	James Mercer	4,460	62.5	
Liberal Reform	Tom Hoskins	2,677	37.5	
Total formal votes		7,137	98.7	
Informal votes		98	1.4	
Turnout		7,235	73.3	
Labour hold				

=== St George ===
1910 New South Wales state election: St George
Party	Candidate	Votes	%	±%
Liberal Reform	William Taylor	6,198	58.5	
Labour	William Bagnall	4,396	41.5	
Total formal votes		10,594	98.9	
Informal votes		118	1.1	
Turnout		10,712	76.7	
Liberal Reform hold				

=== St Leonards ===
1910 New South Wales state election: St Leonards
Party	Candidate	Votes	%	±%
Liberal Reform	Arthur Cocks	3,382	46.0	+15.2
Labour	George Down	2,232	30.4	+21.0
Independent Liberal	Edward Clark (defeated)	1,735	23.6	−13.4
Total formal votes		7,349	99.6	+2.0
Informal votes		29	0.4	−2.0
Turnout		7,378	68.1	−3.8

1910 New South Wales state election: St Leonards - Second Round
Party	Candidate	Votes	%	±%
Liberal Reform	Arthur Cocks	4,443	57.3	+26.5
Labour	George Down	3,317	42.7	+33.3
Total formal votes		7,760	99.7	+2.1
Informal votes		23	0.3	−2.1
Turnout		7,783	71.8	−0.1
Liberal Reform gain from Independent				

=== Sherbrooke ===
1910 New South Wales state election: Sherbrooke
Party	Candidate	Votes	%	±%
Liberal Reform	John Hunt	4,407	67.4	
Labour	Andrew Thompson	2,134	32.6	
Total formal votes		6,541	98.0	
Informal votes		133	2.0	
Turnout		6,674	74.5	
Liberal Reform hold				

=== Singleton ===
1910 New South Wales state election: Singleton
Party	Candidate	Votes	%	±%
Liberal Reform	James Fallick	2,805	55.4	
Labour	Sydney Pender	2,257	44.6	
Total formal votes		5,062	98.3	
Informal votes		88	1.7	
Turnout		5,150	70.1	
Liberal Reform hold				

=== Sturt ===
1910 New South Wales state election: Sturt
Party	Candidate	Votes	%	±%
Labour	Arthur Griffith	5,450	89.2	
Liberal Reform	Henry Kelly	658	10.8	
Total formal votes		6,108	99.0	
Informal votes		59	1.0	
Turnout		6,167	72.2	
Labour hold				

=== Surry Hills ===
1910 New South Wales state election: Surry Hills
Party	Candidate	Votes	%	±%
Labour	Henry Hoyle	3,711	60.4	+25.1
Liberal Reform	Sir James Graham (defeated)	2,399	39.0	+1.7
Independent	John Eaton	38	0.6	
Total formal votes		6,148	97.0	+0.7
Informal votes		191	3.0	−0.7
Turnout		6,339	67.6	−0.8
Labour gain from Liberal Reform				

=== Tamworth ===
1910 New South Wales state election: Tamworth
Party	Candidate	Votes	%	±%
Independent Liberal	Robert Levien	3,997	60.9	+0.9
Labour	John Lord	2,562	39.1	+35.6
Total formal votes		6,559	97.1	+0.7
Informal votes		197	2.9	−0.7
Turnout		6,756	69.6	+5.9
Member changed to Independent Liberal from Progressive (defunct)				

=== Tenterfield ===
1910 New South Wales state election: Tenterfield
Party	Candidate	Votes	%	±%
Liberal Reform	Charles Lee	4,495	59.4	
Labour	Reginald Whereat	2,226	29.4	
Independent	Robert Pyers	849	11.2	
Total formal votes		7,570	97.9	
Informal votes		162	2.1	
Turnout		7,732	67.4	
Liberal Reform hold				

=== The Upper Hunter ===
1910 New South Wales state election: The Upper Hunter
Party	Candidate	Votes	%	±%
Liberal Reform	Henry Willis	3,225	51.9	
Labour	William Ashford	2,995	48.2	
Total formal votes		6,220	98.7	
Informal votes		84	1.3	
Turnout		6,304	74.6	
Liberal Reform gain from Labour				

=== Waratah ===
1910 New South Wales state election: Waratah
Party	Candidate	Votes	%	±%
Labour	John Estell	3,957	85.0	
Liberal Reform	Thomas Collins	697	15.0	
Total formal votes		4,654	96.3	
Informal votes		178	3.7	
Turnout		4,832	61.3	
Labour hold				

=== Waverley ===
1910 New South Wales state election: Waverley
Party	Candidate	Votes	%	±%
Liberal Reform	James Macarthur-Onslow	5,175	52.4	+4.0
Labour	Walter Duncan	3,706	37.5	+31.6
Independent Liberal	Robert Watkins	921	9.3	
Independent	Henry Douglass	74	0.8	
Total formal votes		9,876	99.3	+0.8
Informal votes		72	0.7	+0.5
Turnout		9,948	73.2	−0.1
Member changed to Liberal Reform from Independent Liberal				

=== Wickham ===
1910 New South Wales state election: Wickham
Party	Candidate	Votes	%	±%
Labour	William Grahame	5,059	77.5	
Liberal Reform	Thomas Allsopp	1,473	22.6	
Total formal votes		6,532	98.3	
Informal votes		110	1.7	
Turnout		6,642	67.0	
Labour hold				

=== Wollondilly ===
1910 New South Wales state election: Wollondilly
Party	Candidate	Votes	%	±%
Liberal Reform	William McCourt	3,383	65.0	
Labour	Charles Fern	1,825	35.0	
Total formal votes		5,208	97.9	
Informal votes		112	2.1	
Turnout		5,320	68.0	
Liberal Reform hold				

=== Wollongong ===
1910 New South Wales state election: Wollongong
Party	Candidate	Votes	%	±%
Labour	John Nicholson	5,321	74.9	
Liberal Reform	Edward Beeby	1,785	25.1	
Total formal votes		7,106	97.8	
Informal votes		161	2.2	
Turnout		7,267	65.2	
Labour hold				

=== Woollahra ===
1910 New South Wales state election: Woollahra
Party	Candidate	Votes	%	±%
Liberal Reform	William Latimer	3,657	56.0	
Labour	James McCarthy	2,776	42.5	
Independent	Leo Robinson	99	1.5	
Total formal votes		6,532	98.8	
Informal votes		77	1.2	
Turnout		6,609	69.7	
Liberal Reform hold				

=== Wynyard ===
1910 New South Wales state election: Wynyard
Party	Candidate	Votes	%	±%
Independent Liberal	Robert Donaldson	2,722	51.0	−6.8
Labour	Walter Boston	2,612	49.0	6.8
Total formal votes		5,334	98.4	+0.4
Informal votes		87	1.6	−0.4
Turnout		5,421	78.6	+0.7
Member changed to Independent Liberal from Progressive (defunct)				

=== Yass ===
1910 New South Wales state election: Yass
Party	Candidate	Votes	%	±%
Labour	Niels Nielsen	3,113	53.5	
Liberal Reform	Bernard Grogan	2,705	46.5	
Total formal votes		5,818	98.6	
Informal votes		81	1.4	
Turnout		5,899	73.7	
Labour hold				

== See also ==
- Candidates of the 1910 New South Wales state election
- Members of the New South Wales Legislative Assembly, 1910–1913
