= October 1911 Liverpool Plains state by-election =

Election result for Liverpool Plains, New South Wales, Australia

A by-election was held for the New South Wales Legislative Assembly electorate of Liverpool Plains on 28 October 1911 because the Elections and Qualifications Committee declared that the election of John Perry at the by-election on 16 August 1911 was void. Perry had been declared as winning the seat, with a margin of 3 votes and 91 informal votes, and William Ashford challenged the result before the Elections and Qualifications Committee.

The Committee recounted the votes and held that Perry and Ashford had tied on 2,915 votes each. The provision for a tie only referred to the returning officer as having a casting vote, and he had already concluded his task in returning the writ. The Committee declared that the election was void.

== Dates ==
Date	Event
3 October 1911	Election declared void.
6 October 1911	Writ of election issued by the Speaker of the Legislative Assembly.
16 October 1911	Nominations
28 October 1911	Polling day
14 November 1911	Return of writ

== Results ==
1911 Liverpool Plains by-election Saturday 28 October
Party	Candidate	Votes	%	±%
Labor	William Ashford	4,030	53.5	+3.5
Liberal Reform	John Perry (defeated)	3,524	46.7	−3.5
Total formal votes		7,554	100.0	+1.5
Informal votes		0	0.0	−1.5
Turnout		7,554	83.0 (Note: estimate based on an electoral roll of 9,100 at the 1910 election.)	+18.0
Labor gain from Liberal Reform				

== See also ==
- Electoral results for the district of Liverpool Plains
- List of New South Wales state by-elections
