= 1961 Liverpool Plains state by-election =

Election result for Liverpool Plains, New South Wales, Australia

A by-election was held for the New South Wales Legislative Assembly seat of Liverpool Plains on 26 March 1961 and was triggered by the resignation of Roger Nott (Labor), who was the Minister for Agriculture in the Heffron Labor government and accepted an appointment by the Menzies coalition government to be the Administrator of the Northern Territory.

== Dates ==
Date	Event
3 March 1961	Roger Nott resigned.
7 March 1961	Writ of election issued by the Speaker of the Legislative Assembly.
10 March 1961	Nominations
25 March 1961	Polling day
28 April 1961	Return of writ

== Result ==
1961 Liverpool Plains by-election Saturday 25 March
Party	Candidate	Votes	%	±%
Country	Frank O'Keefe	7,312	50.21	+3.05
Labor	Robert Johnson	7,252	49.79	−1.89
Total formal votes		14,564	98.89	−0.05
Informal votes		163	1.11	+0.05
Turnout		14,727	82.30	−12.43
Country gain from Labor		Swing	+2.5	

== See also ==
- Electoral results for the district of Liverpool Plains
- List of New South Wales state by-elections
