= 1910 Darling Harbour state by-election =

Election result for Darling Harbour, New South Wales, Australia

A by-election was held for the New South Wales Legislative Assembly electorate of Darling Harbour on 13 April 1910. The by-election was triggered by the resignation of John Norton (Independent) to unsuccessfully contest 1910 federal Senate election for NSW.

The by-election and those for Queanbeyan and Upper Hunter were held on the same day as the 1910 Federal election.

== Dates ==
Date	Event
18 February 1910	John Norton resigned.
8 March 1910	Writ of election issued by the Speaker of the Legislative Assembly.
23 March 1910	Nominations
13 April 1910	Polling day and 1910 Federal election
3 May 1910	Return of writ

== Results ==
1910 Darling Harbour by-election Wednesday 13 April
Party	Candidate	Votes	%	±%
Labour	John Cochran	1,592	76.3	+51.6
Independent Labor	William Macey	311	14.9	
Liberal Reform	Henry Kelly	164	7.9	−6.1
Independent	James Jones	21	1.0	
Total formal votes		2,088	98.3	+1.7
Informal votes		36	1.7	−1.7
Turnout		2,124	29.5 (Note: estimate based on an electoral roll of 7,190 at the 1907 election.)	−37.4
Labour hold		Swing		

== See also ==
- Electoral results for the district of Darling Harbour
- List of New South Wales state by-elections
