= John Lloyd (Australian politician) =

English-born Australian politician

John Charles Lloyd (1818 – 23 January 1881) was an English-born Australian politician.

He was born at Acton Round in Shropshire to army officer John Lloyd and Mary Evans. He migrated to New South Wales in 1841 and managed property in the Liverpool Plains district. Around 1855 he married Eleanora Sparks, with whom he had fourteen children. He acquired land in the Liverpool Plains, and visited England in 1864. In 1864 he was elected to the New South Wales Legislative Assembly for Liverpool Plains, serving until his retirement in 1869. He was bankrupted in 1871. Lloyd died at The Myalls near Narrabri in 1881.

New South Wales Legislative Assembly
| Preceded by Marshall Burdekin | Member for Liverpool Plains; 1864–1869 | Succeeded by Charles Cowper |
