= Harry Carter (politician) =

Australian politician

Harry Charles Carter (5 May 1874 – 25 July 1952) was an Australian politician.

He was born at Attleborough, Norfolk, England, to farming bailiff Edward Carter and Dinah Louisa, née Woor. He was educated locally and emigrated to Sydney in 1892, working as a farm hand near Singleton and as a bookkeeper near Quirindi. From 1895 he ran his own property, Yarraman North near Quirindi, which he purchased outright in 1909. On 25 April 1900 he married Elsie Maude Tate, with whom he had four children. He served on Tamarang Shire Council from 1914 to 1928, and later expanded his holdings to include an additional property called Woorak. In 1927 he was elected to the New South Wales Legislative Assembly as the Country Party member for Liverpool Plains, serving until his retirement in 1941. Carter died at Willoughby in 1952.

New South Wales Legislative Assembly
Preceded by New seat	Member for Liverpool Plains; 1927–1941	Succeeded by Roger Nott
