= Sydney Innes-Noad =

Australian politician

Sidney (or Sydney) Reginald Innes-Noad CMG (1 May 1860 – 11 February 1931) was an English-born Australian politician.

He was born at Highgate in London to merchant Frederick Innes-Noad and Emma Matilda Clark. He was educated locally and then at Braintree College. In 1883 he migrated to Melbourne, working for tea merchants. He married Rose Gertrude Howard Smith, with whom he had five daughters. In 1891 he founded his own company, but he sold out in 1897 and moved to Brisbane and later to Sydney. There he became involved with the Liberal and Reform Association. He was unsuccessful at two attempts for election to the New South Wales Legislative Assembly, standing as an Independent Liberal candidate for Wollondilly at the 1904 election, and as the Liberal Candidate for Hartley at the 1910 election. In 1917 he was selected to be the Liberal candidate for St George, however William Bagnall, the Labour member for St George joined the Nationalist party on its creation in 1917 and Innes-Noad stood down to allow Bagnall to contest the seat as part of the agreed arrangements for the formation of the party. In May 1917, after the Nationalist victory at the election, Innes-Noad was appointed to the New South Wales Legislative Council.

In 1929 he was appointed Companion of the Order of St Michael and St George. Innes-Noad died at Beecroft in 1931.
