= 1911 Luxembourg general election =

Partial general elections were held in Luxembourg on 13 and 20 June 1911, electing 21 out of 52 members of the Chamber of Deputies.

== Results ==
Canton	Seats	Candidate	1st round	2nd round
Canton	Seats	Candidate	Votes	Votes
Capellen	3	Edouard Hemmer	1,061	
Capellen	3	Jacques Schmitz	883	
Capellen	3	Guillaume Jeitz	739	
Capellen	3	Dupong	688	
Capellen	3	Wirtgen	594	
Clervaux	3	Jean-Pierre Jérôme Thinnes	663	
Clervaux	3	Émile Prüm	614	
Clervaux	3	François Delaporte	568	
Clervaux	3	Bouvier	488	
Diekirch	4	Félix Reding	898	
Diekirch	4	Nicolas Meris	879	951
Diekirch	4	Pierre Pemmers	670	892
Diekirch	4	Nicolas-Pierre Kunnen	835	800
Diekirch	4	Koob	780	499
Diekirch	4	Kellen	760	354
Diekirch	4	Mongenast	636	
Diekirch	4	J. Hoffmann	353	
Grevenmacher	3	Pierre Godart	888	
Grevenmacher	3	Philippe Bech	874	
Grevenmacher	3	François Altwies	738	978
Grevenmacher	3	Schmit	618	619
Grevenmacher	3	C'asen	612	
Grevenmacher	3	Musquar	512	
Grevenmacher	3	Flamang	275	
Luxembourg-Ville	4	Robert Brasseur	1,089	
Luxembourg-Ville	4	Alphonse Munchen	980	
Luxembourg-Ville	4	Léandre Lacroix	976	
Luxembourg-Ville	4	Luc Housse	917	993
Luxembourg-Ville	4	Philippe	922	908
Luxembourg-Ville	4	Loesch	817	
Luxembourg-Ville	4	Ch. Nouveau	692	
Luxembourg-Ville	4	Drossaert	34	
Redange	3	Pierre Schiltz	894	
Redange	3	Félix Bian	856	
Redange	3	Jean Orianne	776	
Redange	3	P. Raters	446	
Vianden	1	Théodore Klees	116	
Vianden	1	Hess	115	
