= Wilfred Spruson =

Australian politician

Wilfred Joseph Spruson (1870 – 16 August 1939) was an Australia politician and patent attorney.

He was born in Sydney, and was an engineer and patent attorney before entering politics. In 1898 he was elected to the New South Wales Legislative Assembly as the National Federal member for Sydney-Gipps. He was defeated as an Independent Progressive in 1901. After a further run for Darling Harbour as an independent in 1904, he left politics. For his service to the church and for his charitable works, Spruson was awarded the cross Pro Ecclesia et Pontifice by Pope Leo XIII in 1902 and was made a Papal Chamberlain by Pope Pius XI in 1929. Spruson died age 69 on 16 August 1939 at his home in Neutral Bay since 1911, Bengallala. Bengallala was designed for Spruson in the Arts and Crafts style by architect Donald Esplin and has been listed as a heritage item on the North Sydney Local Environmental Plan since 1989.

New South Wales Legislative Assembly
Preceded by George Black	Member for Sydney-Gipps; 1898–1901	Succeeded by William Daley
