= Charles Kemp (politician) =

Australian politician

Charles Kemp (2 June 1813 – 25 August 1864) was an English-born Australian politician.

He was born in London to carpenter Simon Kemp and Mary Ann Cox. He and his family migrated to Port Stephens; he moved to Sydney in 1831 and, after a period in a carpenters' shop, was the colony's first parliamentary reporter. In 1838, he married Stella Christie; they adopted one daughter.

Kemp was the proprietor of The Sydney Morning Herald from 1841 until 1853. Kemp also worked as an underwriter and also went into real estate and the stock market. From 1855 to 1856, he was an inaugural railway commissioner, the government having assumed control of the Sydney and Hunter River Railway Companies, which he had founded. He stood unsuccessfully for the New South Wales Legislative Council for the North Eastern Boroughs (Newcastle and Raymond Terrace) at the 1851 election, for Maneroo in April 1854, and for City of Sydney in May 1854. Kemp was a candidate for the 1859 general election for East Sydney, but was again unsuccessful.

Kemp was chairman of the Hunter River Railway Company, which existed from 1853 to 1855 and began construction on the first portion of what became the Great Northern Railway.

In 1860, he was elected in a by-election to the New South Wales Legislative Assembly for Liverpool Plains, but parliament was dissolved in November 1860 and he was defeated at the general election in December 1860.

From 1860, he was Deputy Chairman of the Commercial Banking Company of Sydney. In April 1861 he was again unsuccessful in a by-election for Parramatta, before being appointed to the Legislative Council in September 1861.

Kemp died in 1864 at Sydney.

New South Wales Legislative Assembly
Preceded by Andrew Loder	Member for Liverpool Plains; 1860	Succeeded by Alexander Dick
