= Roger Nott =

Australian politician

The Honourable Roger Nott CBE
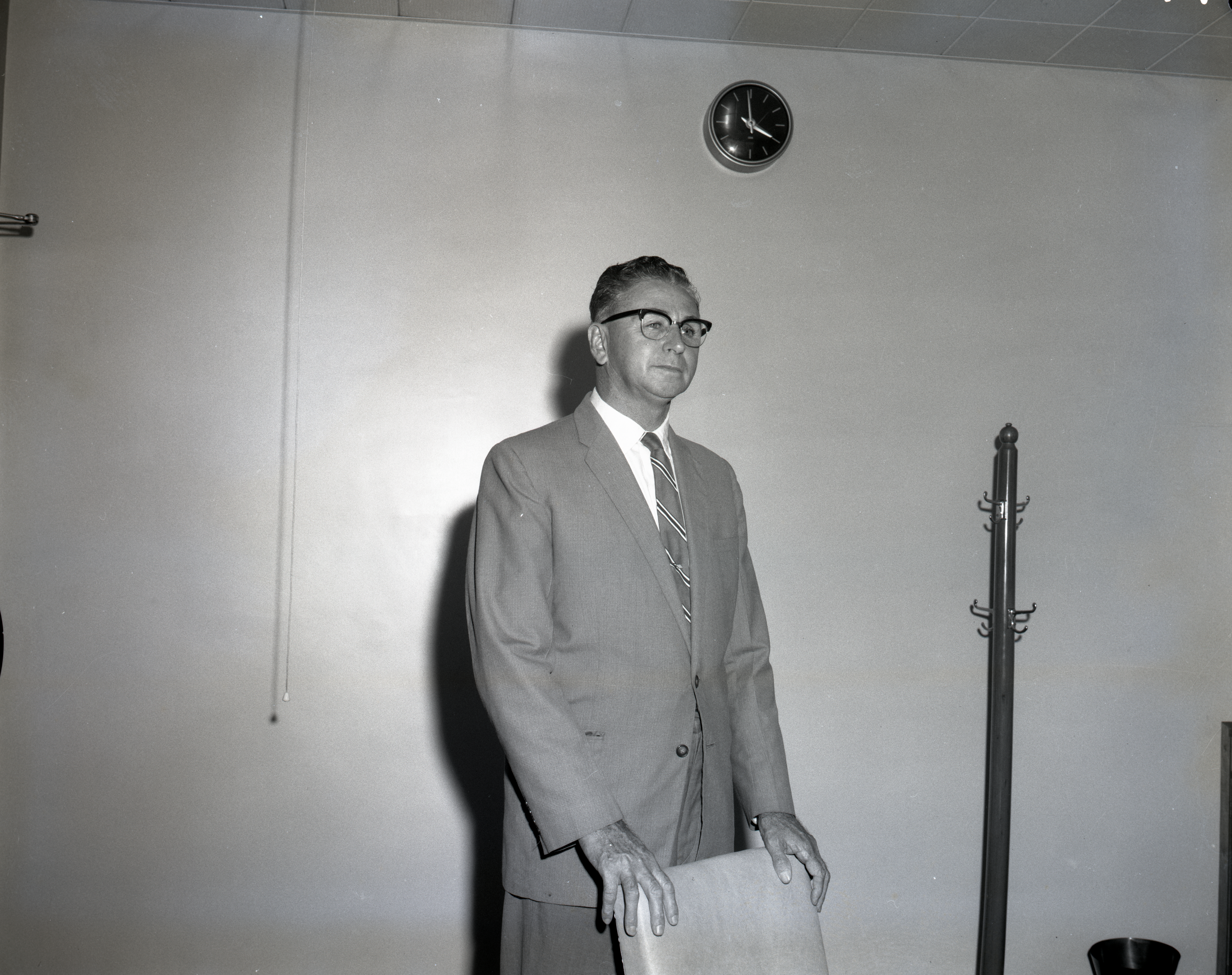
- Nott in 1963

Minister for Agriculture
- In office 14 November 1957 – 3 March 1961
- Premier: Joseph Cahill; Bob Heffron
- Preceded by: Eddie Graham
- Succeeded by: Jack Renshaw

Member of the New South Wales Parliament for Liverpool Plains
- In office 10 May 1941 – 3 March 1961
- Preceded by: Harry Carter
- Succeeded by: Frank O'Keefe

Personal details
- Born: 20 October 1908 Gulgong, New South Wales, Australia
- Died: 28 September 2000 (aged 91) Dunedoo, New South Wales, Australia
- Party: Labor
- Spouse: Mary Rope
- Occupation: shearer, farmer

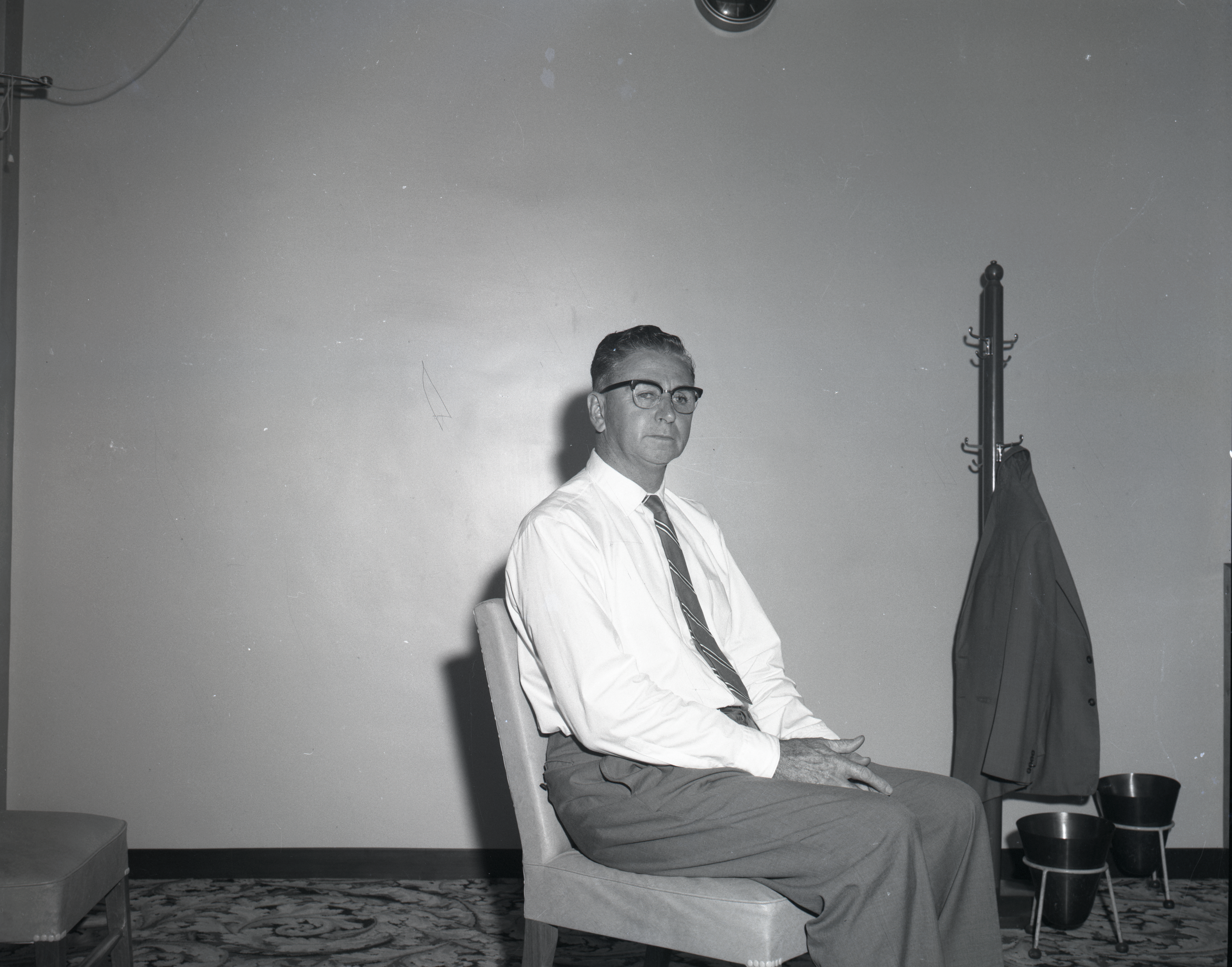
Roger Nott in 1963

Roger Bede Nott CBE (20 October 1908 – 28 September 2000) was an Australian politician and a member of the New South Wales Legislative Assembly from 1941 until 1961. He was a member of the Labor Party and held numerous ministerial positions between 1954 and 1961. He was the Administrator of the Northern Territory between 1961 and 1964.

== Early life ==
Nott was born at Gulgong, New South Wales and was the son of a farmer. Leo Nott, Gulgong Shire President and member of the Legislative Assembly for Mudgee and Burrendong, was his brother. He was educated to elementary level at Gulgong Public School and initially worked as a shearer and farm hand. He later became a wheat farmer at Dunedoo.

== Political career ==
Nott was elected to the parliament as the Labor member for Liverpool Plains at the 1941 state election. He replaced the Country Party member Harry Carter and defeated the Country Party candidate Alfred Yeo who had been the member for Castlereagh. Liverpool Plains was one of a number of rural seats that Labor won at the 1941 election and these victories contributed to the formation of the Labor government of William McKell.

Nott was a member of the governments of Joseph Cahill and Robert Heffron. He was appointed a Minister without portfolio in 1954 and between 1956 and 1957 was the Secretary for Lands and Secretary for Mines. From 1957 until his retirement he was the Minister for Agriculture.

== Later life and career ==
Nott retained his seat in parliament at a further six elections, but resigned in 1961 to accept an appointment from the Federal government as the Administrator of the Northern Territory. It is uncertain why the Liberal–Country Coalition government of Robert Menzies offered the position to a Labor minister. Accepting the position required Nott to resign from parliament, and the Country Party's Frank O'Keefe, who had been an unsuccessful candidate at four previous elections, won the resulting by-election.

He resigned as administrator of the Northern Territory to be appointed Administrator of Norfolk Island in July 1964. Nott ran as the Labor candidate for the 1969 Gwydir by-election and the subsequent general election. He then ran for the 1970 Upper Hunter by-election caused by O'Keefe's transfer to the federal seat of Paterson, coming within 1.6% of winning the seat.

Granted retention of the title "The Honourable" in 1961, Nott was appointed a Commander of the Order of the British Empire (CBE) in 1977 for services to the state of New South Wales.

New South Wales Legislative Assembly
Preceded by Harry Carter	Member for Liverpool Plains; 1941–1961	Succeeded by Frank O'Keefe
Political offices
Preceded by William Gollan	Secretary for Mines; 1956–1957	Succeeded by John McMahon
Preceded by Frank Hawkins	Secretary for Lands; 1956–1957	Succeeded by William Gollan
Preceded by Eddie Graham	Minister for Agriculture; 1957–1961	Succeeded by Jack Renshaw
Government offices
Preceded by James Archer	Administrator of the Northern Territory; 1961–1964	Succeeded by Roger Dean
Preceded by Robert Wordsworth	Administrator of Norfolk Island; 1964–1966	Succeeded by Reginald Marsh
