= December 1911 Cobar state by-election =

- 16 December 1911

Electoral district of Cobar in the New South Wales Legislative Assembly
- Registered: 7,806 (Note: Estimate based on a roll of 7,806 at the 1910 election.)
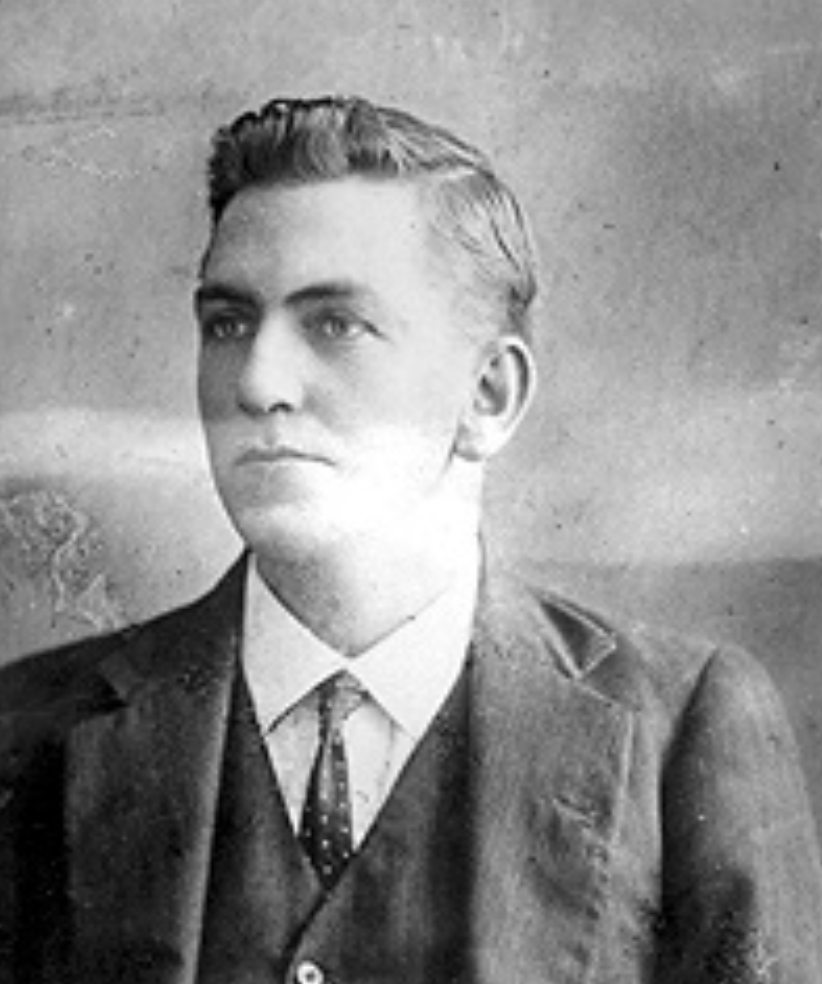
	First party
Candidate	Charles Fern
Party	Labour
Popular vote	Unopposed
MP before election
Donald Macdonell
Labour
Elected MP
Charles Fern
Labour

The December 1911 Cobar state by-election was scheduled to be held on 16 December 1911 to elect the member for Cobar in the New South Wales Legislative Assembly, following the death of Labour Party MP Donald Macdonell.

Macdonell had been absent from parliament because he was unwell, but he was expected to recover. During his absence, a political crisis caused by the resignation of two Labour members resulted in the parliament being prorogued, and he was automatically expelled for non-attendance during an entire session. His seat was declared vacant in September 1911, but he recontested and was elected unopposed at the resulting by-election.

Three weeks after the September by-election, Macdonell died, triggering a second by-election. The only candidate to contest was Labour's Charles Fern, and he was declared elected at the close of candidate nominations on 2 December 1911.

== Key events ==
- 26 October 1911 − Donald Macdonell died
- 13 November 1911 − Charles Fern wins Labour preselection
- 21 November 1911 − Writ of election issued by the Speaker of the Legislative Assembly
- 2 December 1911 − Candidate nominations
- 16 December 1911 − Polling day (scheduled date)
- 30 December 1911 − Return of writ (scheduled date)

== Candidates ==
Party	Candidate	Background
Labour	Charles Fern	Miner and union official

== Result ==
December 1911 Cobar state by-election
Party	Candidate	Votes	%	±%
Labour	Charles Fern	unopposed		
Registered electors		7,806		
Labour hold				

== See also ==
- Electoral results for the district of Cobar
- List of New South Wales state by-elections
