= Alexander Dick (politician) =

Australian politician

Alexander Dick (1827 – 1 June 1867) was an Australian politician.

He was the son of Scottish immigrant Alexander Dick, a silversmith, and Charlotte Hutchison. He was admitted as a solicitor in 1850 and practised in Sydney. In 1860 he was elected to the New South Wales Legislative Assembly for Liverpool Plains, but he resigned in 1862 to accept an appointment as 2nd Examiner of Titles. Dick died on 1 June 1867 (aged 39–40).

New South Wales Legislative Assembly
Preceded by Charles Kemp	Member for Liverpool Plains; 1860 – 1862	Succeeded by Marshall Burdekin
