= Electoral district of Sydney-Gipps =

Former state electoral district of New South Wales, Australia

Sydney-Gipps was an electoral district of the Legislative Assembly in the Australian state of New South Wales, created in 1894 in inner Sydney, replacing part of the former multi-member electorate of West Sydney, and named after Governor George Gipps. It included the Rocks, west of George Street and generally north of Margaret Street. It was abolished in 1904 and absorbed into Darling Harbour.

== Members for Sydney-Gipps ==
Member	Party	Term
George Black	Independent Labour	1894–1895
George Black	Labour	1895–1898
Wilfred Spruson	National Federal	1898–1901
William Daley	Labor	1901–1904

== Election results ==
1901 New South Wales state election: Sydney-Gipps
Party	Candidate	Votes	%	±%
Labour	William Daley	981	53.5	+4.5
Ind. Progressive	Wilfred Spruson	655	35.7	−14.6
Liberal Reform	Elliot Johnson	197	10.8	
Total formal votes		1,833	98.9	−0.4
Informal votes		21	1.1	+0.4
Turnout		1,854	64.4	+4.8
Labour gain from Progressive				
