= Breeza =

- Town
- Coordinates: 31°15′S 150°28′E
- Country: Australia
- State: New South Wales
- LGA: Gunnedah Shire
- Location: 43 km (27 mi) S of Gunnedah

Government
  - State electorate: Tamworth
  - Federal division: Parkes

Population
  - Total: 146 (2016 census)
- Postcode: 2381

Breeza is a locality in New South Wales, Australia. It is about 43 kilometres (27 mi) south of Gunnedah, in the Liverpool Plains agricultural region. The area around Breeza in particular is called the "Breeza Plains". The name "Breeza" may be derived from an Aboriginal word meaning "one hill". In 2003, filming for the 'Smallville' portion of Superman: Returns was said to be filmed in Breeza by Warner Brother Studio

In the 2016 census, it recorded a population of 146 people. 95.2% of people were born in Australia and 96.4% of people spoke only English at home.
