= Andrew Loder =

Australian politician (1826–1900)

Andrew Loder (14 February 1826 – 19 May 1900) was an Australian politician.

He was born at Sackville Reach near Windsor to farmer George Loder and Mary Howe. He worked on his father's properties, and on 14 April 1841 married Elizabeth Sarah Evans; they had no children. In 1859, the year he acquired his own holdings in New England, he was elected to the New South Wales Legislative Assembly for Liverpool Plains, but he resigned in 1860. He bred sheep, cattle and racehorses, and was involved with Randwick Racecourse's foundation. Loder died at Liverpool in 1900.

New South Wales Legislative Assembly
| New seat | Member for Liverpool Plains; 1859–1860 | Succeeded by Charles Kemp |
