= William Daley (Australian politician) =

Australian politician

William Michael Daley (1870 – 15 July 1944) was an Australian politician.

He was born in Sydney to master stevedore Michael Daley and Catherine Ferguson. He attended Fort Street Public School and Marist Brothers College before studying at the University of Sydney. Articled to a solicitor in 1892, he was admitted in 1903. In 1901 he was elected to the New South Wales Legislative Assembly as the Labor member for Sydney-Gipps; he transferred to Darling Harbour in 1904. He was defeated in 1907, in which year he was also suspended from practising as a solicitor until 1908. He had married Daisy Emily Ives on 23 November 1903; they had two children. Daley continued to practise as a solicitor until 1927. He died in North Sydney in 1944.

New South Wales Legislative Assembly
| Preceded by Wilfred Spruson | Member for Sydney-Gipps; 1901–1904 | Abolished |
| New seat | Member for Darling Harbour; 1904–1907 | Succeeded by John Norton |
