= Hanley Bennett =

Australian politician

Hanley Bennett (1815 – 30 April 1893) was an English-born Australian politician.

He was born in Staffordshire and migrated to New South Wales in 1837. He worked as a shoemaker and surveyor, first at Cassilis, then at Muswellbrook from 1843 and at Tamworth from 1855. Around 1843 he married Eliza Watson, with whom he had eight children. An alderman at Tamworth and South Singleton, he was elected to the New South Wales Legislative Assembly for Liverpool Plains in 1872. He served until his defeat in 1880. Bennett died at Tamworth in 1893.

New South Wales Legislative Assembly
Preceded by Lewis Levy	Member for Liverpool Plains; 1872–1880	Abolished
