= 1911 Mudgee state by-election =

Election result for Mudgee, New South Wales, Australia

A by-election was held for the New South Wales Legislative Assembly electorate of Mudgee on 16 August 1911 because of the resignation of Labor Party member Bill Dunn because he disagreed with legislation introduced by the Labor Secretary for Lands Niels Nielsen. Labor reversed its policy and Dunn stood for re-election as the Labor candidate.

== Dates ==
Date	Event
26 July 1911	Bill Dunn resigned.
26 July 1911	Writ of election issued by the Speaker of the Legislative Assembly and close of electoral rolls.
2 August 1911	Nominations
16 August 1911	Polling day
2 September 1911	Return of writ

== Results ==
1911 Mudgee by-election Wednesday 16 August
Party	Candidate	Votes	%	±%
Labor	Bill Dunn (re-elected)	3,173	51.6	−1.6
Liberal Reform	Owen Gilbert	2,975	48.4	+1.6
Total formal votes		6,148	100.0	+1.0
Informal votes		0	0.0	−1.0
Turnout		6,148	72.7 (Note: Estimate based on a roll of 8,458 at the 1910 election.)	−5.3
Labor hold		Swing	−1.6	

== See also ==
- Electoral results for the district of Mudgee
- List of New South Wales state by-elections
