= William Ashford (politician) =

Australian politician

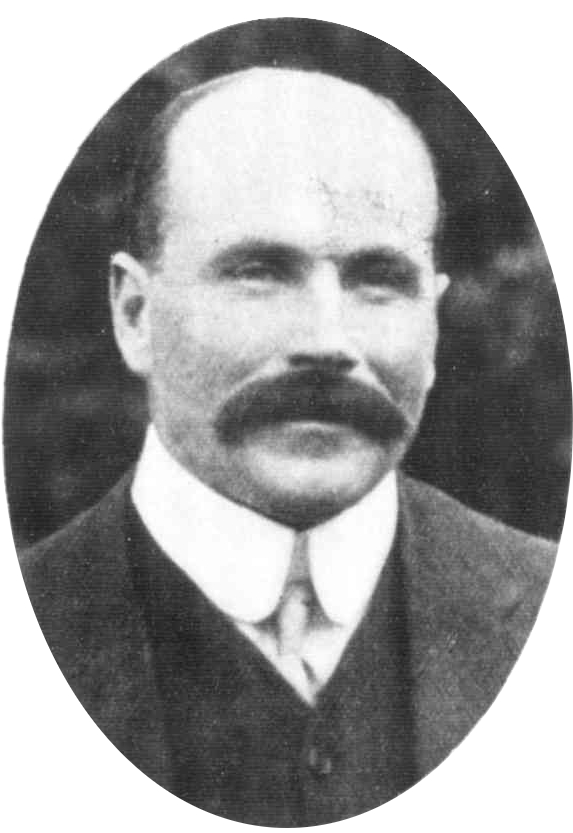
W G Ashford, 1911

William George Ashford (9 August 1874 – 23 March 1925) was an Australian politician.

== Early life ==
Born at Sparks Creek near Scone to selector John Ashford and Rebecca Bell, he attended Sparks Creek Public School before starting work on his father's farm. He later bought a farm on the Hawkesbury River, but sold it to return to Sparks Creek. Around 1904 he married Lily Charlotte Keys Brecht, with whom he had four sons.

== Parliamentary career ==
Ashford stood for election to the New South Wales Legislative Assembly as the Labor candidate for Upper Hunter at the 1907 election, but was unsuccessful. In 1910 the sitting member William Fleming (Liberal Reform) resigned to unsuccessfully contest a federal seat at the 1910 election and Ashford won the April 1910 by-election. He was defeated 6 months later at the general election in October. In 1911 a vacancy arose at Liverpool Plains due to the resignation of Henry Horne (Labor). Ashford was defeated at the by-election in August 1911 with a margin of 3 votes and 91 informal votes. He challenged the result before the Elections and Qualifications Committee, which declared the election void. Ashford comfortably won the subsequent by-election in October 1911.

Ashford was a minister in the Holman Labor ministry, being Minister of Agriculture from 29 January 1914 until 23 February 1915 and again from 15 March to 1 June 1915, and Secretary for Lands from 12 January 1915. He was expelled from Labor on 7 November 1916, along with Holman and 21 others, for defying party policy and supporting conscription. He joined Holman's grand coalition with the members of the various conservative parties, which by 1917 had coalesced into the Nationalist Party. In the Second Holman ministry he retained the office of Secretary for Lands, but added a new role as Minister for Forests. Ashford acted as Minister of Agriculture from October 1919 and was appointed to the role on 9 February 1920, holding the 3 ministries until the defeat of the Nationalist government at the April 1920 election.

In 1920, with the introduction of proportional representation, Ashford was the only Nationalist member for the 3 member district of Wammerawa. He stood as an independent at the 1922 election and the returning officer declared that Ashford had been re-elected. The result was overturned by the Elections and Qualifications Committee who declared that Joseph Clark had been elected instead.

== Death ==
Ashford died at Mosman on 23 March 1925 (aged 50).

New South Wales Legislative Assembly
| Preceded by William Fleming | Member for Upper Hunter; 1910 | Succeeded by Henry Willis |
| Preceded by John Perry | Member for Liverpool Plains; 1911–1920 | Abolished |
| New seat | Member for Wammerawa; 1920–1922; With: Bill Dunn; Joseph Clark / Harold Thorby | Succeeded by Joseph Clark |
Political offices
| Preceded by John Treflé | Minister of Agriculture; 1914 – 1915 | Succeeded by George Black |
| Preceded by George Black | Minister of Agriculture; Mar – Jun 1915 | Succeeded by W C Grahame |
| Preceded by John Treflé | Secretary for Lands; 1915 – 1920 | Succeeded by Peter Loughlin as Secretary for Lands; Minister for Forests |
| New office | Minister for Forests; 1916 – 1920 | Succeeded by Peter Loughlin as Secretary for Lands; Minister for Forests |
| Preceded by W C Grahame | Minister of Agriculture; Feb – Apr 1920 | Succeeded by Bill Dunn |
