= Donald Macdonell (Australian politician) =

Politician, trade unionist and shearer in New South Wales, Australia

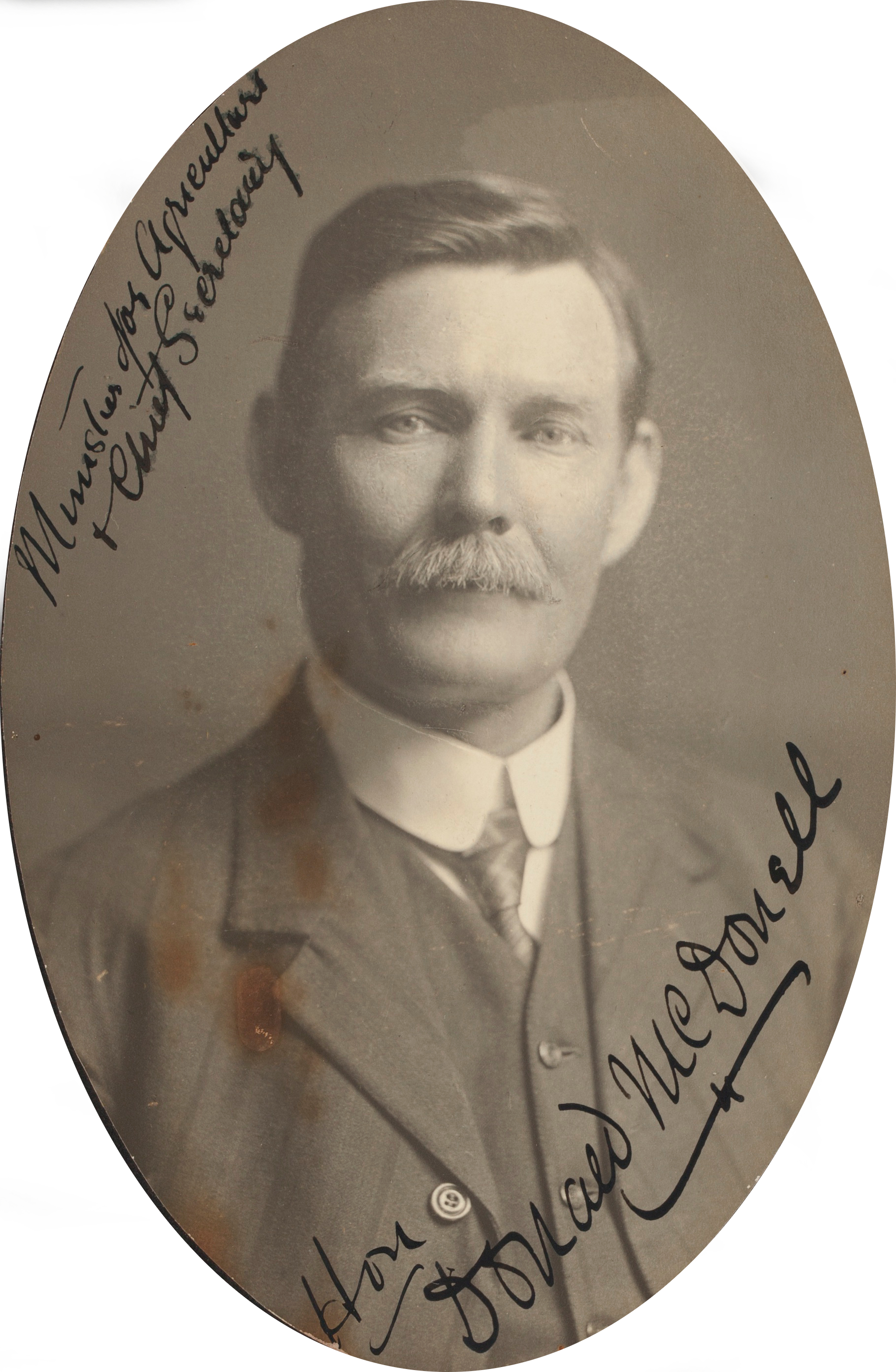

Donald Macdonell (1862 – 26 October 1911) was a politician, trade unionist and shearer in New South Wales, Australia.

Born at Stuart Mill near St Arnaud, Victoria, to Christina née McMaster and Alexander Macdonell, a Scottish-born farmer and shearer. He helped on his father's farm as a child and moved to New South Wales in 1886, being an early member of the Australian Shearers' Union. He played a leading role in the 1891 strike, when he traveled to Queensland. He became secretary of the Shearers' Union's Bourke branch and a member of the Labor Party in 1894, and helped to draft the rules for the new Australian Workers' Union. In the same year the shearers' and labourers' unions amalgamated . He continued as secretary of the AWU's Bourke branch thereafter. He was the general secretary of the AWU from 1900 to 1911.

In 1901 he was elected to the New South Wales Legislative Assembly as the Labor member for Cobar, serving until 1911. He was Minister for Agriculture and Chief Secretary in the McGowen ministry from 1910 to 1911. He had been absent from the parliament from 1 March 1911 due to illness but was expected to recover when a political crisis caused by the resignation of 2 Labor members resulted in the parliament being prorogued and he was automatically expelled for non-attendance during an entire session. He was re-elected unopposed in the Cobar by-election on 7 October, but died three weeks later.

Macdonell died in Melbourne on 26 October 1911 (aged 48–49) and was buried at Stuart Mill.

He was a friend of Henry Lawson who, in 1899, described Macdonell as "the tallest, straightest, and perhaps the best of the Bourke-side bush-leaders".

Parliament of New South Wales
Political offices
Preceded by William Wood	Chief Secretary; 1910–1911	Succeeded by Fred Flowers
Preceded by John Perry	Minister for Agriculture; 1910–1911	Succeeded by John Treflé
New South Wales Legislative Assembly
Preceded by William Spence	Member for Cobar; 1901–1911	Succeeded by Charles Fern
Trade union offices
Preceded by William Spence	General Secretary of the Australian Workers' Union; 1900 – 1911	Succeeded by Tom White
