= John Perry (1849–1935) =

Australian politician

John Perry (1849 – 2 January 1935) was an Australian politician.

He was born in Branxton. He became a goldminer at Gulgong. He married Selina Richardson in 1873; they had two sons. In 1883 he began farming near Walhallow. In 1886, he married his second wife, Mary Harrigan; they had four children. A founding member of the Farmers' and Settlers' Association of New South Wales, he was also closely involved in the Australian Shearers' Union. An early member of the Labor Party, he ran for the New South Wales Legislative Assembly as the endorsed Labor candidate for Quirindi in 1895 and 1898, but by his successful election in 1904 as the member for Liverpool Plains he was describing himself as an Independent Liberal. Defeated as an endorsed Liberal in 1907, he was returned to the parliament in sensational circumstances in August 1911, when he won the by-election for his old seat caused by the resignation of his successor, Henry Horne, over land policy. His four-vote victory was overturned on appeal and he lost the subsequent by-election in October. Perry was later appointed to the Legislative Council in 1920, serving until 1922. He died in Maitland in 1935, aged 85–86.

New South Wales Legislative Assembly
New title	Member for Liverpool Plains; 1904–1907	Succeeded by Henry Horne
Preceded by Henry Horne	Member for Liverpool Plains; 1911	Succeeded by William Ashford
