= John Cochran (Australian politician) =

Australian politician (1864–1926)

John Patrick Cochran (8 March 1864 – 2 December 1926) was an Australian politician.

He was born in Lower Manning to mariner Thomas Cochran and Ellen Lennon. He worked as a labourer and a secretary, and was an official of the United Labourers' Union, a delegate to the Labor Council of New South Wales, and a member of the ULU's executive committee from 1894 to 1910, as secretary from 1906. He was also a member of the Australian Labor Party's central executive, serving in 1905 and from 1907 to 1908. In 1910 he was elected to the New South Wales Legislative Assembly as the member for Darling Harbour. He served as a backbencher until his retirement in 1920, becoming a clerk in the Department of Labour and Industry. He ran once more for office, contesting North Shore for Labor in 1922. Cochran, an unmarried Catholic, died in 1926 in Little Bay.

New South Wales Legislative Assembly
Preceded by John Norton	Member for Darling Harbour; 1910–1920	Abolished
