= Henry Horne (Australian politician) =

Australian politician

Henry Edwin Horne (8 September 1872 – 14 July 1955) was an Australian politician.

He was born in Bibbenluke to pioneer William John Horne and Anne Louise Wilson. He attended the local public school and from 1887 to 1889 was student teacher at Bombala. He taught at Coolah Bridge from 1890 to 1899, when he resigned to farm a property at Leadville. In 1896 he married Isabell Cameron, with whom he had four children. He was elected to the New South Wales Legislative Assembly in 1907 as the Labor member for Liverpool Plains. He served until 1911, when he resigned from parliament and the party in protest at Lands Minister Niels Nielsen's attempt to outlaw the conversion of leasehold land to freehold. His resignation, together with that of Mudgee MLA Bill Dunn, left the McGowen government without a majority, forcing the adjournment of parliament. Horne did not contest the resulting by-election, which was won by the Liberal candidate, but unlike Dunn he did not return to the Labor Party and in 1917 was appointed to the Legislative Council as a Nationalist. He remained in the upper house until his death at Bondi in 1955, by which time he was a Liberal.

New South Wales Legislative Assembly
Preceded by John Perry	Member for Liverpool Plains; 1907–1911	Succeeded by John Perry
