= Electoral district of Darling Harbour =

Former state electoral district of New South Wales, Australia

Darling Harbour was an electoral district of the Legislative Assembly in the Australian state of New South Wales, in the vicinity of Darling Harbour. It was created in the 1904 re-distribution of electorates following the 1903 New South Wales referendum, which required the number of members of the Legislative Assembly to be reduced from 125 to 90. It consisted of the abolished seats of Sydney-Gipps and Sydney-Lang and parts of the abolished seats of Sydney-King and Sydney-Denison. In 1920, with the introduction of proportional representation, it was absorbed into Balmain.

== Members for Darling Harbour ==
| Member | Party | Term |
|---|---|---|
| William Daley | Labour | 1904–1907 |
| John Norton | Independent | 1907–1910 |
| John Cochran | Labor | 1910–1920 |

== Election results ==
1917 New South Wales state election: Darling Harbour
| Party | Candidate | Votes | % | ±% |
|---|---|---|---|---|
| Labor | John Cochran | 3,264 | 73.2 | +8.3 |
| Nationalist | William Phillips | 1,130 | 25.3 | +25.3 |
| Independent | William McMahon | 65 | 1.5 | +1.5 |
| Total formal votes | | 4,459 | 98.3 | +2.7 |
| Informal votes | | 77 | 1.7 | −2.7 |
| Turnout | | 4,536 | 46.8 | −7.6 |
| Labor hold | | Swing | +8.3 | |
