= Electoral district of Liverpool Plains =

Former state electoral district of New South Wales, Australia

Liverpool Plains was an electoral district of the Legislative Assembly in the Australian state of New South Wales, created in 1859 and including the Liverpool Plains (which includes Quirindi and Gunnedah) and the extensive pastoral district around the Gwydir River in the northwest of the state. It was created when the seat of Liverpool Plains and Gwydir was divided into two. It was abolished in 1880, and partly replaced by Gunnedah. It was re-created in the 1904 re-distribution of electorates following the 1903 New South Wales referendum, which required the number of members of the Legislative Assembly to be reduced from 125 to 90. It consisted of parts of the abolished seats of Gunnedah, Quirindi, and Wellington. In 1920, with the introduction of proportional representation it was absorbed into Wammerawa, along with Castlereagh and Mudgee. Liverpool Plains was recreated for the 1927 election and finally abolished in 1962. The district was divided between Barwon and Upper Hunter. The sitting member, Frank O'Keefe (Country), successfully contested Upper Hunter at the 1962 election.

== Members for Liverpool Plains ==
First incarnation (1859–1880)
Member	Party	Term
Andrew Loder	None	1859–1860
Charles Kemp	None	1860–1860
Alexander Dick	None	1860–1862
Marshall Burdekin	None	1863–1864
John Lloyd	None	1864–1869
Charles Cowper	None	1869–1870
Lewis Levy	None	1871–1872
Hanley Bennett	None	1872–1880
Second incarnation (1904–1920)
Member	Party	Term
John Perry	Independent Liberal	1904–1907
John Perry	Liberal Reform	1907–1907
Henry Horne	Labor	1907–1911
John Perry	Liberal Reform	1911–1911
William Ashford	Labor	1911–1917
William Ashford	Nationalist	1917–1920
Third incarnation (1927–1962)
Member	Party	Term
Harry Carter	Country	1927–1941
Roger Nott	Labor	1941–1961
Frank O'Keefe	Country	1961–1962

== Election results ==
1961 Liverpool Plains by-election Saturday 25 March
Party	Candidate	Votes	%	±%
Country	Frank O'Keefe	7,312	50.21	+3.05
Labor	Robert Johnson	7,252	49.79	−1.89
Total formal votes		14,564	98.89	−0.05
Informal votes		163	1.11	+0.05
Turnout		14,727	82.30	−12.43
Country gain from Labor		Swing	+2.5	

Roger Nott (Labor) resigned.
