= Electoral results for the district of Sturt (New South Wales) =

Election results for Sturt, New South Wales, Australia

Sturt, an electoral district of the Legislative Assembly in the Australian state of New South Wales, had two incarnations, from 1889 until 1968 and from 1971 until 1981.

Election	Member	Party				
1889	Wyman Brown	Protectionist				
1891	John Cann	Labor				
1894	William Ferguson	Labour				
1895	William Ferguson	Labour				
1898	William Ferguson	Labour				
1901	William Ferguson	Independent Labour / Liberal Reform				
1904	Arthur Griffith	Labour				
1907	Arthur Griffith	Labour				
1908 by	Arthur Griffith	Labour				
1910	Arthur Griffith	Labour				
1913	John Cann	Labor				
1917 by	Percy Brookfield	Labor / Ind. Socialist Labor				
1917	Percy Brookfield	Labor / Ind. Socialist Labor	Member	Party	Member	Party
1920	Percy Brookfield	Socialist Labor	Mat Davidson	Labor	Brian Doe	Nationalist
1921 Appt	Jabez Wright	Labor	Mat Davidson	Labor	Brian Doe	Nationalist
1922	Jabez Wright	Labor	Mat Davidson	Labor	Brian Doe	Nationalist
1922 Appt	Ted Horsington	Labor	Mat Davidson	Labor	Brian Doe	Nationalist
1925	Ted Horsington	Labor	Mat Davidson	Labor	Brian Doe	Nationalist
1927	Ted Horsington	Labor				
1930	Ted Horsington	Labor				
1932	Ted Horsington	Labor				
1935	Ted Horsington	Labor				
1938	Ted Horsington	Labor / Industrial Labor / Labor				
1941	Ted Horsington	Labor				
1944	Ted Horsington	Labor				
1947	William Wattison	Labor				
1950	William Wattison	Labor				
1953	William Wattison	Labor				
1956	William Wattison	Labor				
1959	William Wattison	Labor				
1962	William Wattison	Labor				
1965	William Wattison	Labor				
Election	Member	Party				
1971	Tim Fischer	National				
1973	Tim Fischer	National				
1976	Tim Fischer	National				
1978	Tim Fischer	National				
1981 by	John Sullivan	National				

== Election results ==
=== Elections in the 1980s ===
==== 1981 by-election ====
1981 Sturt by-election Saturday 21 February
Party	Candidate	Votes	%	±%
National Country	John Sullivan	11,614	63.1	−3.0
Labor	Michael Anthony	6,805	37.0	+3.0
Total formal votes		18,419	99.1	+0.5
Informal votes		165	0.9	−0.5
Turnout		18,584	82.6	−11.2
National Country hold		Swing	−3.0	

Tim Fischer (National Country) resigned to successfully contest the 1980 Murray by-election.

=== Elections in the 1970s ===
==== 1978 ====
1978 New South Wales state election: Sturt
Party	Candidate	Votes	%	±%
National Country	Tim Fischer	13,603	66.0	−2.8
Labor	Michael Anthony	6,995	34.0	+2.8
Total formal votes		20,598	98.7	−0.4
Informal votes		280	1.3	+0.4
Turnout		20,878	93.8	−0.6
National Country hold		Swing	−2.8	

==== 1976 ====
1976 New South Wales state election: Sturt
Party	Candidate	Votes	%	±%
Country	Tim Fischer	13,803	68.8	+1.2
Labor	Cuthbert Richardson	6,266	31.2	+3.9
Total formal votes		20,069	99.1	+0.3
Informal votes		182	0.9	−0.3
Turnout		20,251	94.4	+0.7
Country hold		Swing	−3.4	

==== 1973 ====
1973 New South Wales state election: Sturt
Party	Candidate	Votes	%	±%
Country	Tim Fischer	13,012	67.6	+28.1
Labor	John Foley	5,259	27.3	+27.3
Democratic Labor	Joseph Lenehan	962	5.0	−3.8
Total formal votes		19,233	98.8	
Informal votes		240	1.2	
Turnout		19,473	93.7	
Two-party-preferred result
Country	Tim Fischer	13,782	71.7	+7.4
Labor	John Foley	5,454	28.3	+28.3
Country hold		Swing	+7.4	

==== 1971 ====
1971 New South Wales state election: Sturt
Party	Candidate	Votes	%	±%
Country	Tim Fischer	6,657	39.5	
Independent	Ernest Mitchell	5,484	32.5	
Liberal	William Dixon	3,226	19.1	
Democratic Labor	Bernard O'Keeffe	1,488	8.8	
Total formal votes		16,855	98.5	
Informal votes		262	1.5	
Turnout		17,117	93.9	
Two-candidate-preferred result
Country	Tim Fischer	10,838	64.3	
Independent	Ernest Mitchell	6,017	35.7	
Country notional hold		Swing	N/A	

District re-created

==== 1968 - 1971 ====
District abolished

District abolished

=== Elections in the 1960s ===
==== 1965 ====
1965 New South Wales state election: Sturt
Party	Candidate	Votes	%	±%
Labor	William Wattison	9,487	71.2	−3.8
Country	Edward Brown	3,831	28.8	+3.8
Total formal votes		13,318	98.5	−0.5
Informal votes		196	1.5	+0.5
Turnout		13,514	88.6	+0.7
Labor hold		Swing	−3.8	

==== 1962 ====
1962 New South Wales state election: Sturt
Party	Candidate	Votes	%	±%
Labor	William Wattison	10,284	75.0	+7.0
Country	Edward Brown	3,424	25.0	+4.6
Total formal votes		13,708	99.0	
Informal votes		143	1.0	
Turnout		13,851	87.9	
Labor hold		Swing	+2.9	

=== Elections in the 1950s ===
==== 1959 ====
1959 New South Wales state election: Sturt
Party	Candidate	Votes	%	±%
Labor	William Wattison	10,034	68.0	
Country	Edward Brown	3,016	20.4	
Democratic Labor	George Mailath	1,277	8.6	
Communist	Edward Craill	435	3.0	
Total formal votes		14,762	98.3	
Informal votes		262	1.7	
Turnout		15,024	88.3	
Two-party-preferred result
Labor	William Wattison	10,637	72.1	
Country	Edward Brown	4,125	27.9	
Labor hold		Swing		

==== 1956 ====
1956 New South Wales state election: Sturt
Party	Candidate	Votes	%	±%
Labor	William Wattison	10,107	70.0	−30.0
Independent	John Fox	2,858	19.8	+19.8
Communist	William Flynn	1,468	10.2	+10.2
Total formal votes		14,433	98.0	
Informal votes		287	2.0	
Turnout		14,720	87.2	
Two-candidate-preferred result
Labor	William Wattison	10,841	75.1	−24.9
Independent	John Fox	3,592	24.9	+24.9
Labor hold		Swing	N/A	

==== 1953 ====
1953 New South Wales state election: Sturt
Party	Candidate	Votes	%	±%
Labor	William Wattison	unopposed		
Labor hold				

==== 1950 ====
1950 New South Wales state election: Sturt
Party	Candidate	Votes	%	±%
Labor	William Wattison	unopposed		
Labor hold				

Sturt was reconstituted, with the former district being absorbed by Cobar. The new district comprised part of Cobar, including the towns of South Broken Hill and Menindee, part of Murray, and the western part of the abolished district of Lachlan.

=== Elections in the 1940s ===
==== 1947 ====
1947 New South Wales state election: Sturt
Party	Candidate	Votes	%	±%
Labor	William Wattison	unopposed		
Labor hold				

==== 1944 ====
1944 New South Wales state election: Sturt
Party	Candidate	Votes	%	±%
Labor	Ted Horsington	unopposed		
Labor hold				

==== 1941 ====
1941 New South Wales state election: Sturt
Party	Candidate	Votes	%	±%
Labor	Ted Horsington	8,188	70.8	
State Labor	Arthur Campbell	3,372	29.2	
Total formal votes		11,560	96.8	
Informal votes		383	3.2	
Turnout		11,943	85.6	
Labor hold		Swing		

=== Elections in the 1930s ===
==== 1938 ====
1938 New South Wales state election: Sturt
Party	Candidate	Votes	%	±%
Labor	Ted Horsington	unopposed		
Labor hold				

==== 1935 ====
1935 New South Wales state election: Sturt
Party	Candidate	Votes	%	±%
Labor (NSW)	Ted Horsington	8,924	88.0	−5.2
Independent	Stuart Coombe	1,213	12.0	+12.0
Total formal votes		10,137	90.4	+7.0
Informal votes		1,070	9.6	−7.0
Turnout		11,207	92.5	−2.1
Labor (NSW) hold		Swing	N/A	

==== 1932 ====
1932 New South Wales state election: Sturt
Party	Candidate	Votes	%	±%
Labor (NSW)	Ted Horsington	8,945	93.2	0.0
Communist	Frederick Miller	656	6.8	0.0
Total formal votes		9,601	83.4	−4.4
Informal votes		1,907	16.6	+4.4
Turnout		11,508	94.6	+0.2
Labor (NSW) hold		Swing	0.0	

==== 1930 ====
1930 New South Wales state election: Sturt
Party	Candidate	Votes	%	±%
Labor	Ted Horsington	9,349	93.2	
Communist	Leslie King	685	6.8	
Total formal votes		10,034	87.8	
Informal votes		1,394	12.2	
Turnout		11,428	94.4	
Labor hold		Swing		

=== Elections in the 1920s ===
==== 1927 ====
1927 New South Wales state election: Sturt
Party	Candidate	Votes	%	±%
Labor	Ted Horsington	7,218	70.0	
Nationalist	Alfred Gorrie	3,088	30.0	
Total formal votes		10,306	98.6	
Informal votes		151	1.4	
Turnout		10,457	74.8	
Labor win		(new seat)		

==== 1925 ====
1925 New South Wales state election: Sturt
Party	Candidate	Votes	%	±%
Quota		4,423		
Labor	Mat Davidson (elected 1)	7,237	40.9	+9.6
Labor	Ted Horsington (elected 2)	4,493	25.4	+21.3
Labor	Thomas Griffiths	1,046	5.9	+5.9
Nationalist	Brian Doe (elected 3)	4,355	24.6	+5.1
Nationalist	William Shoobridge	378	2.1	+2.1
Nationalist	Francis Harvey	96	0.5	+0.5
Independent	Charles Dooley	85	0.5	+0.5
Total formal votes		17,690	95.0	+0.5
Informal votes		934	5.0	−0.5
Turnout		18,624	60.3	+0.9
Party total votes
Labor		12,776	72.2	+25.8
Nationalist		4,829	27.3	−5.7
Independent	Charles Dooley	85	0.5	+0.5

==== 1922 appointment ====
Jabez Wright died on 10 September 1922. Ted Horsington was the only unsuccessful Labor candidate at the 1922 election and took his seat on 20 September 1922.

==== 1922 ====
1922 New South Wales state election: Sturt
Party	Candidate	Votes	%	±%
Quota		4,371		
Labor	Mat Davidson (elected 1)	5,472	31.3	+7.1
Labor	Jabez Wright (elected 3)	1,922	11.0	−7.4
Labor	Ted Horsington	708	4.1	+4.1
Nationalist	Brian Doe (elected 2)	3,401	19.5	−5.1
Nationalist	William Daish	1,670	9.5	+9.5
Nationalist	John Wicks	707	4.0	+4.0
Industrial Labor	Donald Grant	1,378	7.9	+7.9
Independent	Ernest Wetherell	856	4.9	+4.9
Independent	William Couch	785	4.5	+4.5
Progressive	Walter O'Grady	505	2.9	+2.9
Independent	Charles Dooley	76	0.4	+0.4
Total formal votes		17,480	94.5	+2.4
Informal votes		1,013	5.5	−2.4
Turnout		18,493	59.4	+9.7
Party total votes
Labor		8,102	46.4	+0.7
Nationalist		5,778	33.0	+6.8
Industrial Labor		1,378	7.9	+7.9
Independent	Ernest Wetherell	856	4.9	+4.9
Independent	William Couch	785	4.5	+4.5
Progressive		505	2.9	+2.9
Independent	Charles Dooley	76	0.4	+0.4

==== 1921 appointment ====
On 22 March 1921 Percy Brookfield was murdered while trying to disarm a deranged man at Riverton. Between 1920 and 1927 the Legislative Assembly was elected using a form of proportional representation with multi-member seats and a single transferable vote (modified Hare-Clark). The Parliamentary Elections (Casual Vacancies) Act, provided that casual vacancies were filled by the next unsuccessful candidate "who represents the same party interest as the late member". Which party interest Brookfield represented was not straightforward. He had been the Labor member for Sturt since the 1917 by-election, however he resigned from the Labor Party in August 1919, and joined the Industrial Socialist Labor Party, which in January 1920 merged with the Socialist Labor Party, retaining the later name. Under this banner Brookfield was the first candidate elected at the 1920 election for Sturt. He was however dissatisfied with the manner in which the affairs of that party have been carried on" and formed a new Industrial Labor Party in February 1921, shortly before his death. There was debate concerning who should be appointed. The Industrial Labor Party said that John O'Reilly should be appointed, while The Sydney Morning Herald stated that Thomas Hynes had the greater number of primary votes and thus he should be appointed. The nomination had to come from the recognised party leader according to votes on any censure motion and Labor leader John Storey nominated Jabez Wright.

==== 1920 ====
1920 New South Wales state election: Sturt
Party	Candidate	Votes	%	±%
Quota		3,958		
Labor	Mat Davidson (elected 3)	3,824	24.2	
Labor	Jabez Wright (defeated)	2,917	18.4	
Labor	Walter Webb	492	3.1	
Socialist Labor	Percy Brookfield (Note: The New South Wales Election Results database, lists Brookfield as the only socialist with Hynes and O'Reilly listed as independents. Contemporary accounts show Brookfield, Hynes and O'Reilly as all being supported by the Amalgamated Miners Association political league, then under the banner of the Socialist Labor Party, which subsequently split to become the Industrial Labor Party.) (elected 1)	4,357	27.5	
Socialist Labor	Thomas Hynes	55	0.4	
Socialist Labor	John O'Reilly	34	0.2	
Nationalist	Brian Doe (elected 2)	3,890	24.6	
Nationalist	Frank Wilkinson	207	1.3	
Nationalist	John Thorn	53	0.3	
Total formal votes		15,829	92.1	
Informal votes		1,358	7.9	
Turnout		17,187	49.7	
Party total votes
Labor		7,233	45.7	
Socialist Labor		4,446	28.1	
Nationalist		4,150	26.2	

=== Elections in the 1910s ===
==== 1917 ====
1917 New South Wales state election: Sturt
Party	Candidate	Votes	%	±%
Labor	Percy Brookfield	4,013	57.1	
Ind. Nationalist	Francis Harvey	3,020	42.9	
Total formal votes		7,033	99.5	
Informal votes		36	0.5	
Turnout		7,069	62.3	
Labor hold				

==== 1917 by-election ====
1917 Sturt by-election Saturday 3 February
Party	Candidate	Votes	%	±%
Labor	Percy Brookfield	3,301	54.4	
Independent Labor	Brian Doe	2,739	45.2	
Independent	John Evans	26	0.4	
Total formal votes		6,066	100.0	
Informal votes		0	0.0	
Turnout		6,066	57.4	
Labor hold		Swing		

John Cann resigned.

==== 1913 ====
1913 New South Wales state election: Sturt
Party	Candidate	Votes	%	±%
Labor	John Cann	unopposed		
Labor hold				

==== 1910 ====
1910 New South Wales state election: Sturt
Party	Candidate	Votes	%	±%
Labour	Arthur Griffith	5,450	89.2	
Liberal Reform	Henry Kelly	658	10.8	
Total formal votes		6,108	99.0	
Informal votes		59	1.0	
Turnout		6,167	72.2	
Labour hold				

=== Elections in the 1900s ===
==== 1908 by-election ====
1908 Sturt by-election Friday 13 November
Party	Candidate	Votes	%	±%
Labor	Arthur Griffith (re-elected)	unopposed		
Labor hold				

Arthur Griffith (Labor) was suspended by the Speaker and chose to resign rather than withdraw his remarks.

==== 1907 ====
1907 New South Wales state election: Sturt
Party	Candidate	Votes	%	±%
Labour	Arthur Griffith	Unopposed		
Labour hold				

==== 1904 ====
1904 New South Wales state election: Sturt
Party	Candidate	Votes	%	±%
Labour	Arthur Griffith	2,658	67.1	
Independent	William Williams	1,304	32.9	
Total formal votes		3,962	98.9	
Informal votes		43	1.1	
Turnout		4,005	58.0	
Labour gain from Independent Labour				

Sturt absorbed part of the abolished seat of Alma and Rylstone. The member for Sturt was William Ferguson (Independent Labour) who unsuccessfully contested The Lachlan while William Williams (Independent Labour) was the member for Alma. Arthur Griffith (Labour) had previously been the member for Waratah however he resigned to unsuccessfully contest the 1903 federal election.

==== 1901 ====
1901 New South Wales state election: Sturt
Party	Candidate	Votes	%	±%
Independent Labor	William Ferguson	716	64.6	
Labour	Charles Maley	392	35.4	
Total formal votes		1,108	98.7	−0.3
Informal votes		15	1.3	+0.3
Turnout		1,123	53.9	+16.9
Member changed to Independent Labour from Labour				

William Ferguson had been elected in 1898 as a Labour representative, however he was denied endorsement due to his independent behaviour in the Assembly.

=== Elections in the 1890s ===
==== 1898 ====
1898 New South Wales colonial election: Sturt
Party	Candidate	Votes	%	±%
Labour	William Ferguson	655	86.5	
National Federal	Thomas Walker	92	12.2	
Independent	Alexander Hendry	10	1.3	
Total formal votes		757	99.0	
Informal votes		8	1.1	
Turnout		765	37.0	
Labour hold				

==== 1895 ====
1895 New South Wales colonial election: Sturt
Party	Candidate	Votes	%	±%
Labour	William Ferguson	unopposed		
Labour hold				

==== 1894 ====
1894 New South Wales colonial election: Sturt
Party	Candidate	Votes	%	±%
Labour	William Ferguson	1,065	73.1	
Ind. Protectionist	John Souter	393	27.0	
Total formal votes		1,458	98.5	
Informal votes		23	1.6	
Turnout		1,481	85.1	
Labour hold				

==== 1891 ====
1891 New South Wales colonial election: Sturt Saturday 20 June
Party	Candidate	Votes	%	±%
Labour	John Cann (elected)	unopposed		
Labour gain from Protectionist				

The sitting member for Sturt, Wyman Brown (Protectionist), did not contest the election.

=== Elections in the 1880s ===
==== 1889 ====
1889 New South Wales colonial election: Sturt Wednesday 13 February
Party	Candidate	Votes	%	±%
Protectionist	Wyman Brown (elected)	654	72.7	
Protectionist	Charles O'Neill	246	27.3	
Total formal votes		900	97.9	
Informal votes		19	2.1	
Turnout		919	31.4	
Protectionist win		(new seat)		

Sturt and Wilcannia were new seats split off from Wentworth which previously returned two members.
