= Electoral results for the district of Broken Hill =

Election result for Broken Hill, New South Wales, Australia

Broken Hill, an electoral district of the Legislative Assembly in the Australian state of New South Wales has had two incarnations, from 1894 to 1913 and from 1968 to 1999.

Election	Member	Party
1894	John Cann	Labour
1895	John Cann	Labour
1898	John Cann	Labour
1901	John Cann	Labour
1904	John Cann	Labour
1907	John Cann	Labour
Election	Member	Party
1968	Lew Johnstone	Labor
1971	Lew Johnstone	Labor
1973	Lew Johnstone	Labor
1976	Lew Johnstone	Labor
1978	Lew Johnstone	Labor
1981	Bill Beckroge	Labor
1984	Bill Beckroge	Labor
1988	Bill Beckroge	Labor
1991	Bill Beckroge	Labor
1995	Bill Beckroge	Labor

== Election results ==
=== Elections in the 1990s ===
==== 1995 ====
1995 New South Wales state election: Broken Hill
Party	Candidate	Votes	%	±%
Labor	Bill Beckroge	16,292	52.8	−0.4
National	Mark Kersten	13,236	42.9	+14.1
Independent	Gordon Dansie	1,324	4.3	+4.3
Total formal votes		30,852	94.2	+3.8
Informal votes		1,889	5.8	−3.8
Turnout		32,741	90.0	
Two-party-preferred result
Labor	Bill Beckroge	16,677	54.7	−5.3
National	Mark Kersten	13,804	45.3	+5.3
Labor hold		Swing	−5.3	

==== 1991 ====
1991 New South Wales state election: Broken Hill
Party	Candidate	Votes	%	±%
Labor	Bill Beckroge	16,600	53.2	+9.1
National	Peter Laird	8,996	28.8	−14.1
Liberal	David Atkins	2,909	9.3	−3.1
Democrats	Keith Ridley	1,121	3.6	+3.1
Country Residents	Mary Casey-Marshall	1,021	3.3	+3.3
Independent	George Diamantes	558	1.8	+1.8
Total formal votes		31,205	90.5	−6.2
Informal votes		3,291	9.5	+6.2
Turnout		34,496	92.6	
Two-party-preferred result
Labor	Bill Beckroge	17,479	60.1	+12.1
National	Peter Laird	11,628	39.9	−12.1
Labor notional gain from National		Swing	+12.1	

Broken Hill became a notional Country seat as a result of the 1990 redistribution, however Bill Beckroge (Labor) retained the seat with an increased margin.

=== Elections in the 1980s ===
==== 1988 ====
1988 New South Wales state election: Broken Hill
Party	Candidate	Votes	%	±%
Labor	Bill Beckroge	13,111	47.4	−18.0
National	Mark Olson	10,442	37.7	+17.7
Liberal	David Atkins	4,123	14.9	+0.8
Total formal votes		27,676	96.4	−1.4
Informal votes		1,021	3.6	+1.4
Turnout		28,697	92.7	
Two-party-preferred result
Labor	Bill Beckroge	14,022	52.0	−14.9
National	Mark Olson	12,947	48.0	+14.9
Labor hold		Swing	−14.9	

==== 1984 ====
1984 New South Wales state election: Broken Hill
Party	Candidate	Votes	%	±%
Labor	Bill Beckroge	17,440	68.7	−0.3
Liberal	Geoffrey Anderson	4,019	15.8	+15.8
National	Neville Crisp	3,913	15.4	−15.6
Total formal votes		25,372	97.8	+0.9
Informal votes		577	2.2	−0.9
Turnout		25,949	89.7	+0.9
Two-party-preferred result
Labor	Bill Beckroge		70.1	+1.1
Liberal	Geoffrey Anderson		29.9	+29.9
Labor hold		Swing	+1.1	

==== 1981 ====
1981 New South Wales state election: Broken Hill
Party	Candidate	Votes	%	±%
Labor	Bill Beckroge	17,041	69.0	
National Country	George Gleeson	7,647	31.0	
Total formal votes		24,688	96.9	
Informal votes		779	3.1	
Turnout		25,467	88.8	
Labor hold		Swing	−3.0	

=== Elections in the 1970s ===
==== 1978 ====
1978 New South Wales state election: Broken Hill
Party	Candidate	Votes	%	±%
Labor	Lew Johnstone	14,519	75.9	−24.1
National Country	John Betterman	3,005	15.7	+15.7
Liberal	Peter Swan	1,609	8.4	+8.4
Total formal votes		19,133	97.9	
Informal votes		417	2.1	
Turnout		19,550	91.8	
Two-party-preferred result
Labor	Lew Johnstone	14,680	77.1	−22.9
National Country	John Betterman	4,353	22.9	+22.9
Labor hold		Swing	−22.9	

==== 1976 ====
1976 New South Wales state election: Broken Hill
Party	Candidate	Votes	%	±%
Labor	Lew Johnstone	unopposed		
Labor hold				

==== 1973 ====
1973 New South Wales state election: Broken Hill
Party	Candidate	Votes	%	±%
Labor	Lew Johnstone	unopposed		
Labor hold				

==== 1971 ====
1971 New South Wales state election: Broken Hill
Party	Candidate	Votes	%	±%
Labor	Lew Johnstone	unopposed		
Labor hold				

=== Elections in the 1960s ===
==== 1968 ====
1968 New South Wales state election: Broken Hill
Party	Candidate	Votes	%	±%
Labor	Lew Johnstone	14,255	70.8	
Country	Edward Brown	5,872	29.2	
Total formal votes		20,127	98.2	
Informal votes		363	1.8	
Turnout		20,490	91.1	
Labor win		(new seat)		

Broken Hill was a new seat, and consisted of parts of the abolished districts of Cobar and Sturt and was the first time since 1913 where all of the town of Broken Hill was in the one district. Lew Johnstone (Labor) was the member for Cobar. The member for Sturt, William Wattison (Labor), did not contest the election.

District recreated

==== 1913 - 1968 ====
District abolished

=== Elections in the 1900s ===
==== 1907 ====
1907 New South Wales state election: Broken Hill
Party	Candidate	Votes	%	±%
Labour	John Cann	Unopposed		
Labour hold				

==== 1904 ====
1904 New South Wales state election: Broken Hill
Party	Candidate	Votes	%	±%
Labour	John Cann	unopposed		
Labour hold				

Broken Hill absorbed part of the abolished seat of Alma. John Cann (Labour) was the member for Broken Hill. William Williams (Independent Labour), the member for Alma, unsuccessfully contested Sturt as an independent.

==== 1901 ====
1901 New South Wales state election: Broken Hill
Party	Candidate	Votes	%	±%
Labour	John Cann	1,281	93.5	+7.4
Independent Liberal	Charles Counsell	89	6.5	
Total formal votes		1,370	98.8	+2.8
Informal votes		17	1.2	−2.8
Turnout		1,387	40.4	−5.3
Labour hold				

=== Elections in the 1890s ===
==== 1898 ====
1898 New South Wales colonial election: Broken Hill
Party	Candidate	Votes	%	±%
Labour	John Cann	1,125	86.1	
National Federal	Alexander Hendry	182	13.9	
Total formal votes		1,307	96.0	
Informal votes		54	4.0	
Turnout		1,361	45.7	
Labour hold				

==== 1895 ====
1895 New South Wales colonial election: Broken Hill
Party	Candidate	Votes	%	±%
Labour	John Cann	unopposed		
Labour hold				

==== 1894 ====
1894 New South Wales colonial election: Broken Hill
Party	Candidate	Votes	%	±%
Labour	John Cann	1,123	72.6	
Protectionist	Wyman Brown	423	27.4	
Total formal votes		1,546	98.9	
Informal votes		17	1.1	
Turnout		1,563	86.2	
Labour win		(new seat)		
