= Electoral results for the district of Cobar =

Election results for Cobar, New South Wales, Australia

Cobar, an electoral district of the Legislative Assembly in the Australian state of New South Wales had two incarnations, from 1894 until 1920 and from 1930 until 1968.

First incarnation (1894–1920)
Election	Member	Party
1894	Thomas Waddell	Protectionist
1895	Thomas Waddell	Protectionist
1898	William Spence	Labour
1901	Donald Macdonell	Labour
1904	Donald Macdonell	Labour
1907	Donald Macdonell	Labour
1910	Donald Macdonell	Labour
Oct 1911 by	Donald Macdonell	Labour
Dec 1911 by	Charles Fern	Labour
1913	Charles Fern	Labour
1917	Charles Fern	Labour
1918 by	Mat Davidson	Labor
Second incarnation (1930–1968)
Election	Member	Party
1930	Mat Davidson	Labor
1932	Mat Davidson	Labor (NSW)
1935	Mat Davidson	Labor (NSW)
1938	Mat Davidson	Labor / Industrial Labor (Note: Mat Davidson joined the Industrial Labor Party in April 1939, The Industrial Labor Party was readmitted into Labor at the unity conference on 26 August 1939.)
1941	Mat Davidson	Labor
1944	Mat Davidson	Labor
1947	Mat Davidson	Labor
1949 by	Ernest Wetherell	Labor
1950	Ernest Wetherell	Labor
1953	Ernest Wetherell	Labor
1956	Ernest Wetherell	Labor
1959	Ernest Wetherell	Labor
1962	Ernest Wetherell	Labor
1965	Lew Johnstone	Labor

== Election results ==
=== Elections in the 1960s ===
==== 1965 ====
1965 New South Wales state election: Cobar
Party	Candidate	Votes	%	±%
Labor	Lew Johnstone	6,200	45.0	−55.0
Liberal	Allan Connell	5,174	37.5	+37.5
Independent	Douglas McFarlane	1,416	10.3	+10.3
Independent	William Edwards	997	7.2	+7.2
Total formal votes		13,787	97.8	
Informal votes		315	2.2	
Turnout		14,102	89.6	
Two-party-preferred result
Labor	Lew Johnstone	7,636	55.4	−44.6
Liberal	Allan Connell	6,151	44.6	+44.6
Labor hold		Swing	N/A	

==== 1962 ====
1962 New South Wales state election: Cobar
Party	Candidate	Votes	%	±%
Labor	Ernest Wetherell	unopposed		
Labor hold				

=== Elections in the 1950s ===
==== 1959 ====
1959 New South Wales state election: Cobar
Party	Candidate	Votes	%	±%
Labor	Ernest Wetherell	unopposed		
Labor hold				

==== 1956 ====
1956 New South Wales state election: Cobar
Party	Candidate	Votes	%	±%
Labor	Ernest Wetherell	unopposed		
Labor hold				

==== 1953 ====
1953 New South Wales state election: Cobar
Party	Candidate	Votes	%	±%
Labor	Ernest Wetherell	unopposed		
Labor hold				

==== 1950 ====
1950 New South Wales state election: Cobar
Party	Candidate	Votes	%	±%
Labor	Ernest Wetherell	8,717	66.4	
Country	Frederick Harding	4,419	33.6	
Total formal votes		13,136	98.5	
Informal votes		203	1.5	
Turnout		13,339	87.0	
Labor hold		Swing		

Cobar absorbed the entire district of Sturt, but lost the towns of Bourke and Nyngan to Castlereagh and South Broken Hill and Menindee to the re-constituted Sturt.

=== Elections in the 1940s ===
==== 1949 by-election ====
1949 Cobar by-election Saturday 12 March
Party	Candidate	Votes	%	±%
Labor	Ernest Wetherell	6,107	65.3	
Liberal	Harold Campbell	2,235	23.9	
Communist	Hadley McMeekin	1,007	10.8	
Total formal votes		9,349	98.1	
Informal votes		177	1.9	
Turnout		9,526	73.9	
Labor hold		Swing	N/A	

The by-election was caused by the death of Mat Davidson (Labor).

==== 1947 ====
1947 New South Wales state election: Cobar
Party	Candidate	Votes	%	±%
Labor	Mat Davidson	unopposed		
Labor hold				

==== 1944 ====
1944 New South Wales state election: Cobar
Party	Candidate	Votes	%	±%
Labor	Mat Davidson	8,352	78.3	−6.1
Lang Labor	William Burgess	2,313	21.7	+21.7
Total formal votes		10,665	97.0	0.0
Informal votes		330	3.0	0.0
Turnout		10,995	81.1	−3.3
Labor hold		Swing	N/A	

==== 1941 ====
1941 New South Wales state election: Cobar
Party	Candidate	Votes	%	±%
Labor	Mat Davidson	10,003	84.4	
State Labor	David Wight	1,843	15.6	
Total formal votes		11,846	97.0	
Informal votes		366	3.0	
Turnout		12,212	84.4	
Labor hold		Swing		

=== Elections in the 1930s ===
==== 1938 ====
1938 New South Wales state election: Cobar
Party	Candidate	Votes	%	±%
Labor	Mat Davidson	unopposed		
Labor hold				

==== 1935 ====
1935 New South Wales state election: Cobar
Party	Candidate	Votes	%	±%
Labor (NSW)	Mat Davidson	7,978	70.3	+10.1
Federal Labor	Joseph Bowe	3,370	29.7	+18.0
Total formal votes		11,348	96.5	−1.8
Informal votes		408	3.5	+1.8
Turnout		11,756	91.9	−1.0
Labor (NSW) hold		Swing	N/A	

==== 1932 ====
1932 New South Wales state election: Cobar
Party	Candidate	Votes	%	±%
Labor (NSW)	Mat Davidson	6,729	60.2	−12.2
Country	Eric Killen	3,137	28.1	+28.1
Federal Labor	Samuel Bailey	1,306	11.7	+11.7
Total formal votes		11,172	98.3	+1.0
Informal votes		197	1.7	−1.0
Turnout		11,369	92.9	+2.0
Labor (NSW) hold		Swing	N/A	

- Preferences were not distributed.

==== 1930 ====
1930 New South Wales state election: Cobar
Party	Candidate	Votes	%	±%
Labor	Mat Davidson	7,645	72.4	
Nationalist	John Lawson	2,750	26.0	
Communist	Edmund Rees	172	1.6	
Total formal votes		10,567	97.3	
Informal votes		288	2.7	
Turnout		10,855	90.9	
Labor win		(new seat)		

Cobar was a re-created seat, and comprised part of the districts of Sturt, Lachlan and Namoi. Mat Davidson (Labor) was the member for Murray.

District recreated

==== 1920 - 1930 ====
District abolished

=== Elections in the 1910s ===
==== 1918 by-election ====
1918 Cobar state by-election
Party	Candidate	Votes	%	±%
Labor	Mat Davidson	unopposed		
Registered electors		8,088 (Note: Estimate based on a roll of 8,088 at the 1917 election.)		
Labor hold				

==== 1917 ====
1917 New South Wales state election: Cobar
Party	Candidate	Votes	%	±%
Labor	Charles Fern	unopposed		
Labor hold				

==== 1913 ====
1913 New South Wales state election: Cobar
Party	Candidate	Votes	%	±%
Labor	Charles Fern	3,529	76.0	
Liberal Reform	Maxwell Pahlow	1,114	24.0	
Total formal votes		4,643	97.2	
Informal votes		134	2.8	
Turnout		4,777	47.4	
Labor hold				

Cobar was significantly expanded, absorbing most of the abolished district of The Darling, including the town of Bourke.

==== December 1911 by-election ====
December 1911 Cobar state by-election
Party	Candidate	Votes	%	±%
Labour	Charles Fern	unopposed		
Registered electors		7,806 (Note: Estimate based on a roll of 7,806 at the 1910 election.)		
Labour hold				

The by-election caused by the death of Donald Macdonell (Labour).

==== October 1911 by-election ====
1911 Cobar by-election 1 Saturday 23 September
Party	Candidate	Votes	%	±%
Labour	Donald Macdonell (re-elected)	unopposed		
Registered electors		7,806 (Note: Estimate based on a roll of 7,806 at the 1910 election.)		
Labour hold				

==== 1910 ====
1910 New South Wales state election: Cobar
Party	Candidate	Votes	%	±%
Labour	Donald Macdonell	unopposed		
Labour hold				

=== Elections in the 1900s ===
==== 1907 ====
1907 New South Wales state election: Cobar
Party	Candidate	Votes	%	±%
Labour	Donald Macdonell	Unopposed		
Labour hold				

==== 1904 ====
1904 New South Wales state election: Cobar
Party	Candidate	Votes	%	±%
Labour	Donald Macdonell	1,982	68.8	
Liberal Reform	Richard McNeice	899	31.2	
Total formal votes		2,881	99.3	
Informal votes		19	0.7	
Turnout		2,900	44.7	
Labour hold				

Cobar absorbed parts of The Lachlan and parts of the abolished seats of The Barwon, Condoublin and Wilcannia. The member for The Barwon was William Willis (Progressive) who unsuccessfully contested The Darling. The member for Condoublin was Patrick Clara (Labour) who unsuccessfully contested Ashburnum. The member for The Lachlan was James Carroll (Progressive) who unsuccessfully contested that seat. The member for Wilcannia was Richard Sleath (Independent Labour) who also unsuccessfully contested The Darling.

==== 1901 ====
1901 New South Wales state election: Cobar
Party	Candidate	Votes	%	±%
Labour	Donald Macdonell	unopposed		
Labour hold				

=== Elections in the 1890s ===
==== 1898 ====
1898 New South Wales colonial election: Cobar
Party	Candidate	Votes	%	±%
Labour	William Spence	777	50.1	
National Federal	Michael O'Halloran	396	25.5	
Independent Federalist	Richard Machattie	339	21.9	
Independent	Samuel Wood	39	2.5	
Total formal votes		1,551	98.0	
Informal votes		31	2.0	
Turnout		1,582	52.0	
Labour gain from National Federal				

The sitting member Thomas Waddell (National Federal) successfully contested Cowra.

==== 1895 ====
1895 New South Wales colonial election: Cobar
Party	Candidate	Votes	%	±%
Protectionist	Thomas Waddell	538	59.5	
Labour	Michael O'Halloran	357	39.5	
Ind. Free Trade	McA Lamrock	9	1.0	
Total formal votes		904	99.1	
Informal votes		8	0.9	
Turnout		912	55.3	
Protectionist hold				

==== 1894 ====
1894 New South Wales colonial election: Cobar
Party	Candidate	Votes	%	±%
Protectionist	Thomas Waddell	615	50.1	
Labour	A Murphy	514	41.9	
Free Trade	Neil Morrison	98	8.0	
Total formal votes		1,227	99.0	
Informal votes		13	1.1	
Turnout		1,240	75.3	
Protectionist win		(new seat)		

Cobar consisted of part of Bourke and parts of the abolished districts of The Bogan and Forbes. Thomas Waddell (Protectionist) was one of the members for Bourke.
