= Electoral results for the district of The Darling =

Election results for The Darling, New South Wales, Australia

The Darling, an electoral district of the Legislative Assembly in the Australian state of New South Wales was created in 1904 and abolished in 1913.

election	Member	Party
1904	John Meehan	Labour
1907	John Meehan	Labour
1910	John Meehan	Labour

== Election results ==
=== 1910 ===
1910 New South Wales state election: The Darling
Party	Candidate	Votes	%	±%
Labour	John Meehan	1,866	78.4	
Liberal Reform	William Shepherd	515	21.6	
Total formal votes		2,381	97.3	
Informal votes		66	2.70	
Turnout		2,447	48.4	
Labour hold				

=== 1907 ===
1907 New South Wales state election: The Darling
Party	Candidate	Votes	%	±%
Labour	John Meehan	2,370	67.0	
Liberal Reform	William Davis	1,170	33.1	
Total formal votes		4,583	97.5	
Informal votes		120	2.6	
Turnout		4,703	61.2	
Labour hold				

=== 1904 ===
1904 New South Wales state election: The Darling
Party	Candidate	Votes	%	±%
Labour	John Meehan	1,999	50.6	
Progressive	William Willis	1,692	42.8	
Independent Labour	Richard Sleath	259	6.6	
Total formal votes		3,950	98.9	
Informal votes		44	1.1	
Turnout		3,994	55.5	
Labour win		(new seat)		

The Darling was a new seat comprising Bourke and parts of The Barwon and Wilcannia electorates. The member for Bourke was William Davis (Progressive) who did not contest the election. The member for The Barwon was William Willis (Progressive) while the member for Wilcannia was Richard Sleath who had initially been elected as a Labour candidate at the 1894 election, but had lost his Labour endorsement prior to the 1901 election which he won as an Independent Labour candidate.
