= Electoral results for the district of Willyama =

Election results for Willyama, New South Wales, Australia

Willyama, an electoral district of the Legislative Assembly in the Australian state of New South Wales, had one incarnation, from 1913 to 1920.

Election	Member	Party
1913	Jabez Wright	Labor
1917	Jabez Wright	Labor

== Election results ==
=== Elections in the 1910s ===
==== 1917 ====
1917 New South Wales state election: Willyama
Party	Candidate	Votes	%	±%
Labor	Jabez Wright	3,381	64.6	−8.7
Ind. Nationalist	Brian Doe	1,851	35.4	+35.4
Total formal votes		5,232	99.5	+1.8
Informal votes		24	0.5	−1.8
Turnout		5,256	59.2	−3.6
Labor hold		Swing	−8.7	

==== 1913 ====
1913 New South Wales state election: Willyama
Party	Candidate	Votes	%	±%
Labor	Jabez Wright	4,327	73.3	
Independent Liberal	William Ferguson	1,029	17.4	
Independent	Walter Wright	545	9.2	
Total formal votes		5,901	97.7	
Informal votes		137	2.3	
Turnout		6,038	62.8	
Labor win		(new seat)		
