= 1918 Cobar state by-election =

- 1 June 1918

Electoral district of Cobar in the New South Wales Legislative Assembly
- Registered: 8,088 (Note: Estimate based on a roll of 8,088 at the 1917 election.)
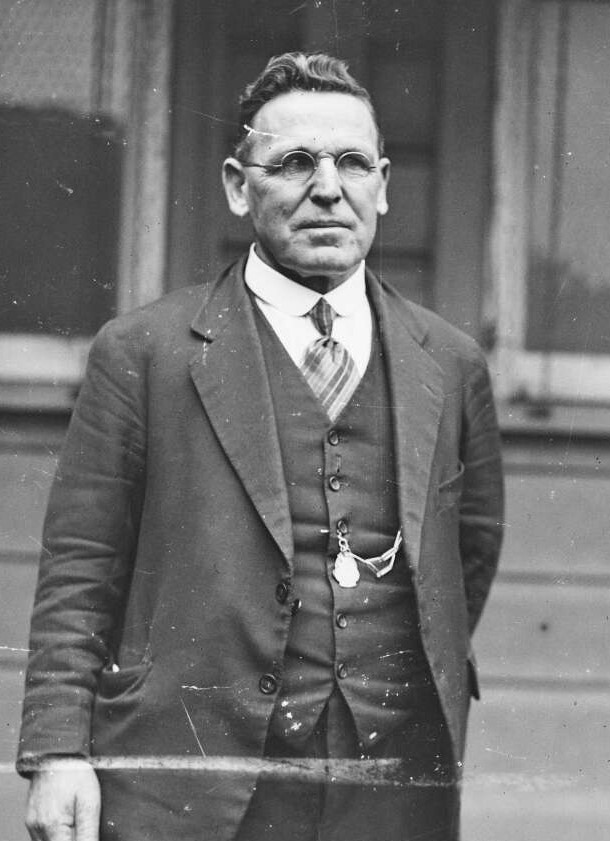
	First party
Candidate	Mat Davidson
Party	Labor
Popular vote	Unopposed
MP before election
Charles Fern
Labor
Elected MP
Mat Davidson
Labor

The 1918 Cobar state by-election was scheduled to be held on 1 June 1918 to elect the member for Cobar in the New South Wales Legislative Assembly, following the death of Labor Party MP Charles Fern.

The only candidate to contest was Labour's Mat Davidson, and he was declared elected at the close of candidate nominations on 11 May 1918. The Nationalist Party chose not to contest based on the precedent set at the 1915 by-elections in Armidale and Willoughby, which were not contested by the major non-incumbent party in either seat after the sitting members were killed in action at Gallipoli.

== Key events ==
- 18 April 1918 − Charles Fern dies
- 1 May 1918 − Writ of election issued by the Speaker of the Legislative Assembly
- 11 May 1918 − Candidate nominations
- 1 June 1918 − Polling day (no poll held)
- 17 June 1918 − Return of writ (scheduled date)

== Candidates ==
Party	Candidate	Background
Labor	Mat Davidson	Alderman on Cobar Municipal Council

Additionally, former MP Arthur Rae was reported to be contesting as Labor's candidate, but this did not eventuate.

== Result ==
1918 Cobar state by-election
Party	Candidate	Votes	%	±%
Labor	Mat Davidson	unopposed		
Registered electors		8,088		
Labor hold				

== See also ==
- Electoral results for the district of Cobar
- List of New South Wales state by-elections
