= 1917 Sturt state by-election =

Election result for Sturt, New South Wales, Australia

A by-election was held for the New South Wales Legislative Assembly electorate of Sturt on 13 January 1917 following the resignation of John Cann who resigned to take the position of assistant commissioner of the New South Wales Government Railways. Cann had been elected as a Labor candidate at the 1913 election, however he was expelled from the party for voting against Labor's censure motion on 10 November 1916.

== Dates ==
Date	Event
10 November 1916	John Cann voted against Labor's censure motion.
11 November 1916	The Barrier District branch of Labor passed a vote of no confidence in John Cann because of his attitude on conscription.
13 November 1916	The Labor executive expelled John Cann from Labor.
20 December 1916	John Cann resigned.
29 December 1916	John Cann appointed an assistant railway commissioner.
3 January 1917	Writ of election issued by the Speaker of the Legislative Assembly and close of electoral rolls.
13 January 1917	Nominations
3 February 1917	Polling day
20 February 1917	Return of writ

== Results ==
1917 Sturt by-election Saturday 3 February
Party	Candidate	Votes	%	±%
Labor	Percy Brookfield	3,301	54.4	
Independent Labor	Brian Doe	2,739	45.2	
Independent	John Evans	26	0.4	
Total formal votes		6,066	100.0	
Informal votes		0	0.0	
Turnout		6,066	57.4	
Labor hold		Swing		

== See also ==
- Electoral results for the district of Sturt (New South Wales)
- List of New South Wales state by-elections
