= Electoral results for the district of Wilcannia =

Election results for Wilcannia, New South Wales, Australia

Wilcannia, an electoral district of the Legislative Assembly in the Australian state of New South Wales was created in 1889 and abolished in 1904.

Election	Member	Party
1889	Edward Dickens	Protectionist
1891	Edward Dickens	Protectionist
1894	Richard Sleath	Labour
1895	Richard Sleath	Labour
1898	Richard Sleath	Labour
1901	Richard Sleath	Independent Labour

== Election results ==
=== Elections in the 1900s ===
==== 1901 ====
1901 New South Wales state election: Wilcannia
Party	Candidate	Votes	%	±%
Independent Labor	Richard Sleath	637	47.9	−24.1
Labour	John Buzacott	414	31.1	
Independent Liberal	Thomas Bell	280	21.0	
Total formal votes		1,331	99.3	−0.3
Informal votes		10	0.8	+0.3
Turnout		1,341	52.5	+9.9
Member changed to Independent Labour from Labour				

=== Elections in the 1890s ===
==== 1898 ====
1898 New South Wales colonial election: Wilcannia
Party	Candidate	Votes	%	±%
Labour	Richard Sleath	770	72.0	
National Federal	Edmond O'Donnell	300	28.0	
Total formal votes		1,070	99.5	
Informal votes		5	0.5	
Turnout		1,075	42.6	
Labour hold				

==== 1895 ====
1895 New South Wales colonial election: Wilcannia
Party	Candidate	Votes	%	±%
Labour	Richard Sleath	unopposed		
Labour hold				

==== 1894 ====
1894 New South Wales colonial election: Wilcannia
Party	Candidate	Votes	%	±%
Labour	Richard Sleath	971	67.7	
Protectionist	Edward Dickens	463	32.3	
Total formal votes		1,434	98.3	
Informal votes		25	1.7	
Turnout		1,459	77.8	
Labour gain from Protectionist				

==== 1891 ====
1891 New South Wales colonial election: Wilcannia Saturday 20 June
Party	Candidate	Votes	%	±%
Protectionist	Edward Dickens (re-elected)	unopposed		
Protectionist hold				

==== 1889 ====
1889 New South Wales colonial election: Wilcannia Wednesday 13 February
Party	Candidate	Votes	%	±%
Protectionist	Edward Dickens (elected)	209	68.3	
Free Trade	Charles Fartiere	97	31.7	
Total formal votes		306	97.8	
Informal votes		7	2.2	
Turnout		313	25.6	
Protectionist win		(new seat)		

Wilcannia and Sturt were new seats split off from Wentworth which previously returned two members.
