= 1949 Cobar state by-election =

Election result for Cobar, New South Wales, Australia

A by-election was held for the New South Wales Legislative Assembly electorate of Cobar on 12 March 1949 because of the death of Mat Davidson (Labor).

== Dates ==
Date	Event
9 January 1949	Mat Davidson died.
11 February 1949	Writ of election issued by the Speaker of the Legislative Assembly and close of electoral rolls.
18 February 1949	Nominations
12 March 1949	Polling day, between the hours of 8 am and 8 pm
24 March 1949	Return of writ

== Result ==
1949 Cobar by-election Saturday 12 March
Party	Candidate	Votes	%	±%
Labor	Ernest Wetherell	6,107	65.3	
Liberal	Harold Campbell	2,235	23.9	
Communist	Hadley McMeekin	1,007	10.8	
Total formal votes		9,349	98.1	
Informal votes		177	1.9	
Turnout		9,526	73.9	
Labor hold		Swing	N/A	

== See also ==
- Electoral results for the district of Cobar
- List of New South Wales state by-elections
