= 1908 Sturt state by-election =

Election result for Sturt, New South Wales, Australia

A by-election was held for the New South Wales Legislative Assembly electorate of Sturt on 13 November 1908. The by-election was triggered by the resignation of Arthur Griffith (Labor).

== Background ==
There was an industrial dispute at Broken Hill and the Inspector-General of Police, Edmund Fosbery, had dispatched additional police to the city. In Parliament Griffith asked the Chief Secretary, William Wood various questions including "whether it was a fact that a 'trainload' of police had been sent to Broken Hill". He then moved for the matter to be discussed by the House as a matter of urgency, however this was rejected by the House. Later Griffith again sought to have the matter discussed by the House and the Speaker, William McCourt, ruled it out of order, without hearing argument. Griffith then said "it was unfortunate to be in a minority, and that the Speaker did not give fair play to the Opposition." He was then "named" by the Speaker and on refusing to withdraw the remarks was found guilty of contempt of parliament and suspended until he withdrew the remark. Griffith chose to resign rather than withdraw the remarks.

== Dates ==
Date	Event
3 November 1908	Resignation of Arthur Griffith.
4 November 1908	Writ of election issued by the Speaker of the Legislative Assembly.
13 November 1908	Nominations
21 November 1908	Polling day
1 December 1908	Return of writ

== Results ==
1908 Sturt by-election Friday 13 November
Party	Candidate	Votes	%	±%
Labor	Arthur Griffith (re-elected)	unopposed		
Labor hold				

Arthur Griffith (Labor) was suspended by the Speaker and chose to resign rather than withdraw his remarks.

== See also ==
- Electoral results for the district of Sturt
- List of New South Wales state by-elections
