= Willyama =

Willyama may refer to:

- Electoral district of Willyama, New South Wales, Australia
- former name of Broken Hill, New South Wales
