= William Wattison =

Australian politician

Member of the New South Wales Parliament for Electoral district of Sturt
- In office 3 April 1947 – 23 January 1968
- Preceded by: Ted Horsington
- Succeeded by: Seat Abolished

Personal details
- Born: William Ernest Wattison; 5 November 1903 Broken Hill, New South Wales
- Died: 13 November 1975 (aged 72) Bateau Bay, New South Wales
- Party: Labor Party
- Spouse: Winifred Ivy Williams
- Occupation: Miner

William Ernest Wattison (5 November 1903 – 13 November 1975) was an Australian politician and a member of the New South Wales Legislative Assembly from 1947 until 1968. He was a member of the Labor Party (ALP).

== Early life ==
Wattison was born in Broken Hill, New South Wales and was the son of a miner. He was educated at Burke Ward Public School in Broken Hill and worked for the Barrier Daily Truth while still young. Later he worked as a miner and was active in the local union movement, including serving on the Barrier Industrial Council for 15 years. He was involved in the Broken Hill Unemployed Union in the Great Depression in the early 1930s and served as the assistant secretary of the Workers Industrial Union of Australia (WIUA), the local miners' union. He was involved with local organizations including the Broken Hill Hospital Board and the Royal Far West Children's Health Scheme.

== Parliamentary career ==
Wattison was elected to the parliament as the Labor member for Sturt at the 1947 election having won preselection against the sitting Labor member Ted Horsington in December 1946. He had contested the preselection ballots of the Barrier District Association of the Australian Labor Party (BDAALP) for Sturt since the early 1930s. Wattison's preselection reflected a general shift to the right in the local labour movement, and away from earlier, more radical political leaders. Wattison was Broken Hill's first MLA to have been born in the town. Wattison retained the seat for the Labor Party at the next 6 elections and retired from public life at the 1968 election. He sat on the central executive of the ALP from 1954 to 1957.

New South Wales Legislative Assembly
Preceded by Ted Horsington	Member for Sturt; 1947 – 1968	Succeeded by seat abolished
