= Mark Kersten =

Australian politician

Mark Raymond Kersten (born 1950) is a former Australian politician. He was a National Party member of the New South Wales Legislative Council from 1995 to 1999.

== Early life and career ==
Kersten was born in Broken Hill in New South Wales.

== Early career ==
Kersten worked as a signwriter and painter from 1966 to 1995. Unlike many Coalition politicians, he had a background in the union movement, having been president of the Amalgamated Metal Workers Union from 1985 to 1986. He was also chairman of Neighbourhood Watch 1986–87, an executive member of the Murray Darling Association 1992–95, and chairman of the Broken Hill Proud Association 1993–94. In 1993, he was also made chairman of the Far West Regional Development Board, a position he held until 1995.

== Political career ==
At the 1995 state election, he was selected as the National Party's candidate for the seat of Broken Hill. He was defeated by sitting Labor member Bill Beckroge, but shortly afterward, he was appointed to the New South Wales Legislative Council after the retirement of Robert Webster. In 1999 he retired from the Council in order to contest the lower house seat of Murray-Darling, a notional National seat created from large parts of the abolished electorates of Broken Hill and Murray. Kersten was defeated by Labor candidate Peter Black, and has not returned to politics.
