= 1981 Sturt state by-election =

Election result for Sturt, New South Wales, Australia

A by-election was held for the New South Wales Legislative Assembly electorate of Sturt on 21 February 1981 following the resignation of Tim Fischer (National Country) to successfully contest the seat of Murray at the 1980 by-election.

By-elections for the seats of Cessnock, Oxley and Maitland were held on the same day.

== Dates ==
Date	Event
12 August 1980	Resignation of Tim Fischer.
22 January 1981	Writ of election issued by the Speaker of the Legislative Assembly and close of electoral rolls.
29 January 1981	Day of nomination
21 February 1981	Polling day
13 March 1981	Return of writ

== Results ==
1981 Sturt by-election Saturday 21 February
Party	Candidate	Votes	%	±%
National Country	John Sullivan	11,614	63.1	−3.0
Labor	Michael Anthony	6,805	37.0	+3.0
Total formal votes		18,419	99.1	+0.5
Informal votes		165	0.9	−0.5
Turnout		18,584	82.6	−11.2
National Country hold		Swing	−3.0	

== See also ==
- Electoral results for the district of Sturt
- List of New South Wales state by-elections
