= Arthur Hill Griffith =

Politician, teacher and patent attorney in New South Wales, Australia

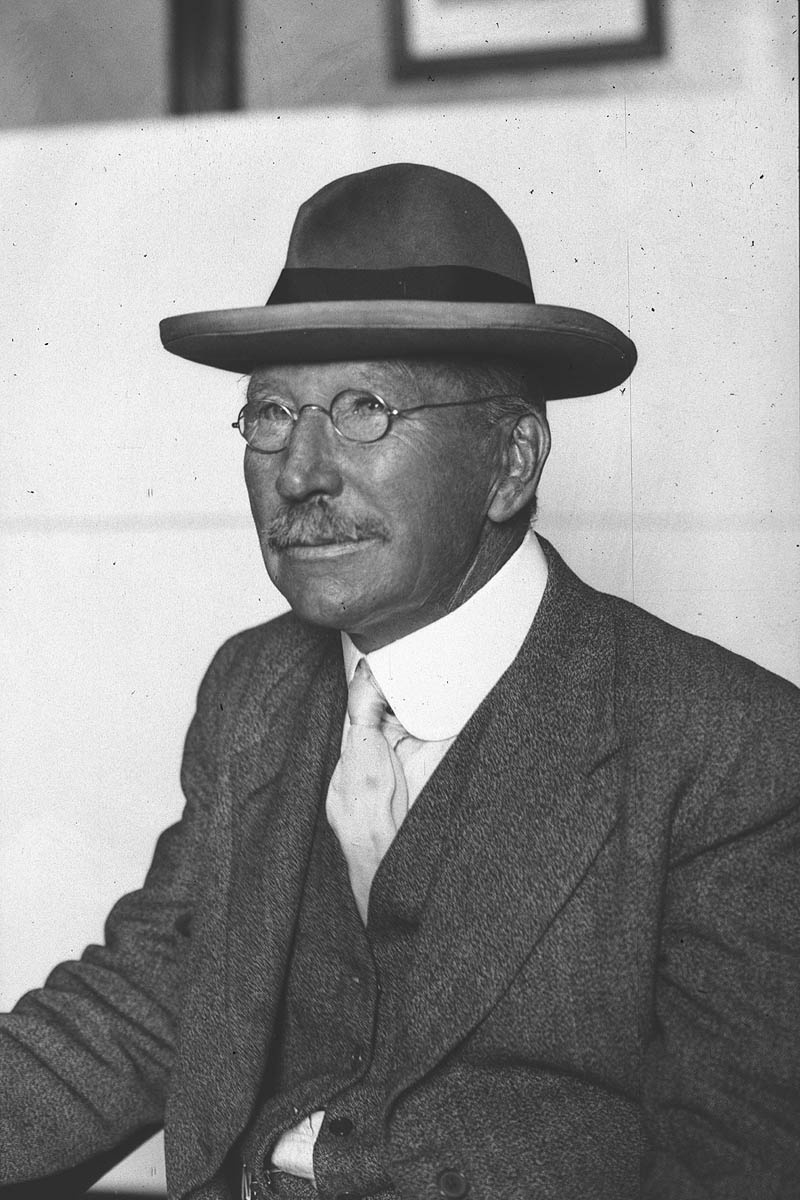
Arthur Hill Griffith, 1931

Arthur Hill Griffith (16 October 1861 – 1 November 1946) was a politician, teacher and patent attorney in New South Wales, Australia. He was a member of the New South Wales Legislative Assembly from 1894 until 1917 and held a number of ministerial positions in the Government of New South Wales. He was a member of the Labor Party.

== Early life ==
Griffith was born in Westmeath, Ireland, to Arthur Hill Griffith (1810–1881), a magistrate, and his second wife, Hannah Rose Cottingham (1826–1921), daughter of James Courtney Morton Cottingham, Esquire (1788 - 1876), and Hannah Robinson.

His paternal grandfather was Richard Griffith, MP, whose son, Sir Richard Griffith, 1st Baronet, was his uncle. His great-grandmother was the noted actress and writer Elizabeth Griffith. The Griffith family descends from the Dukes of Penrhyn.

His siblings included Christopher Arthur Griffith (1858 - 1949), a physician, and Edward Arthur Griffith (1857–1949), a mining attorney, whose descendants include Jules-Arthur Paré (1917–2013), professor emeritus of McGill University Faculty of Medicine, and his granddaughter, celebrated actress Jessica Paré.

In 1871, Griffith emigrated with his family from Ireland to Melbourne, Australia.

== Political career ==
Despite residing in Sydney, Griffith was the candidate for the Labor Party (ALP) for the seat of Waratah at the state election held on 12 July 1894. He was successful with 820 votes (44%) and was re-elected at elections in 1895, 1898 and 1901.

In 1903 he resigned his seat to contest a Senate seat for New South Wales at the 1903 federal election. He was unsuccessful and as the by-election for Waratah was held prior to the Senate election, Griffith was denied the chance to recontest. In the following year, he was successful as the endorsed Labor candidate for the seat of Sturt (based on the mining town of Broken Hill) at the general election of 6 August. Griffith was re-elected unopposed at the 1907 election but resigned from parliament the following year in protest at being suspended by the speaker when he protested the Speaker's alleged procedural unfairness. He won the subsequent by-election unopposed and continued to represent Sturt until the general election of 15 November 1913. A redistribution of state electorates resulted in Griffith stepping aside for John Cann the member for the abolished seat of Broken Hill. He successfully contested the Sydney electorate of Annandale, defeating the sitting member Albert Bruntnell.

== Ministerial career ==
In the New South Wales Labor Governments of James McGowen and William Holman he was the Minister for Public Works. From March 1915 until November 1916, he was the Minister of Public Instruction. As Minister for Public Works, Griffith encouraged the growth of state enterprises and increased spending on railway construction. Griffith had consistently advocated for the greater industrialization of Newcastle, then, Under Holman, he personally negotiated the establishment of a Newcastle Steelworks with Guillaume Delprat of BHP, and was the architect of the Walsh Island establishment; though censured by the 1913 party conference cabinet for it, the scheme proved successful.

== Expulsion from Labor Party ==
During the Labor split over conscription in World War I he supported conscription but resigned from the government on 31 October 1916 when Holman confirmed that he was considering entering into a coalition with the Liberal Reform Party, stating that he could not join in the coalition, having battled all his life for the labor movement. He was expelled from the Labor Party because of his support for conscription, and contested the 24 March 1917 election as an independent labor candidate. He was defeated by William O'Brien the official Labor candidate by 154 votes (2.0%). He stood as an independent at the 1920 election for Balmain, but polled only 165 votes (0.5%). He attempted to be readmitted to the Labor party in the 1920s, succeeding in 1930, only to have his readmission rescinded. The New South Wales branch of the Labor party was expelled by the Federal Executive during the Federal Conference in March 1931, and Griffith was on the executive of the Federal Labor Party and was unsuccessful in the 1932 election for Waratah.

Griffith was one of the best known middle-class, professional supporters of the Labor party in its first 25 years. He maintained a socialist and republican stance throughout his public career.

== Personal life ==
Giffith married Mildred Carrington Smith on 4 May 1899 and they had a son Sturt de Burgh Griffith. Mildred died on 21 October 1926. On 22 October 1932 he married a second time to Elsie Marion née Edwards and they had a son and a daughter.

He died at Jannali on 1 November 1946 (aged 85).

== Honours ==
As Secretary for Public Works he was responsible for the Murrumbidgee Irrigation Area project which established a number of towns, including Griffith which was named after him.

== See also ==
  - Members of the New South Wales Legislative Assembly
  - 1894–1895
  - 1895–1898
  - 1898–1901
  - 1901–1904
  - 1904–1907
  - 1907–1910
  - 1910–1913
  - 1913–1917
  - Results of New South Wales elections
  - 1894 (Waratah)
  - 1895 (Waratah)
  - 1898 (Waratah)
  - 1901 (Waratah)
  - 1904 (Sturt)
  - 1907 (Sturt)
  - 1908 by-election (Sturt)
  - 1910 (Sturt)
  - 1913 (Annandale)
  - 1917 (Annandale)
  - 1920 (Balmain)
  - 1932 (Waratah)
- History of the steel industry (1850–1970)

Parliament of New South Wales
Political offices
Preceded by Charles Lee	Secretary for Public Works; 1910 – 1915	Succeeded by John Cann
New South Wales Legislative Assembly
Preceded by New seat	Member for Waratah; 1894 – 1903	Succeeded by Matthew Charlton
Preceded by William Ferguson	Member for Sturt; 1904 – 1913	Succeeded by John Cann
Preceded by Albert Bruntnell	Member for Annandale; 1913 – 1917	Succeeded by William O'Brien
