= Sturt de Burgh Griffith =

Australian air force officer (1905–1979)

Sturt de Burgh Griffith (15 August 1905 – 14 December 1979) was an Australian engineer, patent attorney, air force officer and journalist who was in command of the RAAF Base Darwin during the Bombing of Darwin.

== Early life ==
Griffith was born in the Sydney suburb of Manly. He was the son of Arthur Hill Griffith and his wife Mildred Carrington (née Smith). He completed his schooling at the Sydney Church of England Grammar School before studying electrical and mechanical engineering at the University of Sydney where he graduated in 1928. In December 1925, while at university, Griffith joined the Citizen Air Force where he gained a 'distinguished pass' in his pilot's training and was commissioned in May 1927. During this time in the Citizen Air Force he survived two perilous landings with only minor injuries.

After completing his studies he gained practical engineering experience at the Colonial Sugar Refining Company and the Pyrmont works. Soon after this he entered his father's firm, Griffith & Hassel, as a patent attorney and was admitted to practice law in 1930 and later became a partner.

In 1934 Griffith transferred to the Citizen Air Force reserve, where he held the rank of flight lieutenant. On 23 April 1937 he married Winnifred Morris Marshall.

== World War II service ==
Due to the outbreak of World War II Griffith was mobalised into the Royal Australian Air Force in September 1939. He first served as the lead of the No. 22 squadron at the Richmond Air Force Base between November 1940 and September 1941 before being transferred to Canberra. In Canberra he commanded the Royal Australian Air Force Station and the School of Army Co-operation. In October 1941 he was promoted to temporary wing commander and, in January 1942, awarded the Air Force Cross.

On 30 January 1942 Griffith received command of the RAAF Base Darwin. He started there less than three weeks before the start of the Bombing of Darwin on 19 February 1924. When the first bombing took place Griffith did not raise the alarm when he received a message at 9:37 AM that a large formation of aircraft were on their way, having crossed Bathurst Island (Nguyu), as he believed they were likely American planes, and did not raise it until 9:58 AM. This was only seconds before the planes arrived.

The second part of this first raid, which occurred between 11:55 AM and 12:20 PM, hit the RAAF base and six men were killed and nine aircraft were destroyed. It was observed that Griffith was 'rattled' by the attack. After the raid Griffiths gave an oral order for all base staff to assemble 'half a mile down the Batchelor road and half a mile into the bush' but that order was distorted by repetition and some men stated that they had been ordered to go 3 miles, 7 miles or 11 miles. This confusion meant that on 23 February, four days after the raid, 278 men were considered missing.

After the raid a Commission of Inquiry, led by Charles Lowe, was unable to determine who was to blame for the delay in raising the alarm. Despite this Lowe did find that Griffith must take some responsibility. It was also found that, despite the fact that Griffith had been in command for only three weeks, he was partly at fault for the RAAF's general unpreparedness and that his performance during the raid itself was incompetent and lacking in leadership.

Soon after this Griffith was transferred to command the No. 7 Squadron at Bairnsdale in Victoria. Soon after, in June, he was transferred again to the No.5 Maintenance Group in Sydney where he worked primarily in an administrative capacity. In December 1943 he was promoted to temporary group captain and, that month, took command of the No.1 Aircraft Depot in Laverton, Victoria. In October 1945 he transferred back to the reserves and began working again as a patent attorney and a consultant engineer.

== Post World War II ==
After the end of the War Griffith continued work as a lawyer and was a councilor (1932–1951) and then president (1947–1948) of the Institute of Patent Attorneys of Australia.

In the 1950s Griffith also became the motoring correspondent for The Sydney Morning Herald where he would complete road tests of cars. As a part of this junior staff from the newspaper would bring cars to him at his home in Leura, in the Blue Mountains, and sit 'in terror beside him as he hurled the cars around his set course'. His reports on these cars, published under the name Sturt Griffith, became very well respected and that reports by him could mean the difference between the success or failure of a new model of car. In 1959 and 1966 his reports were published as compilations and published as Sturt Griffith's Road Tests. In 1974 Griffith also published Philosophy of a Fine Car about the history of the Daimler Benz.

He retired in December 1975 and died on 14 December 1979.
