= John Cann (politician) =

Australian politician (1860–1940)

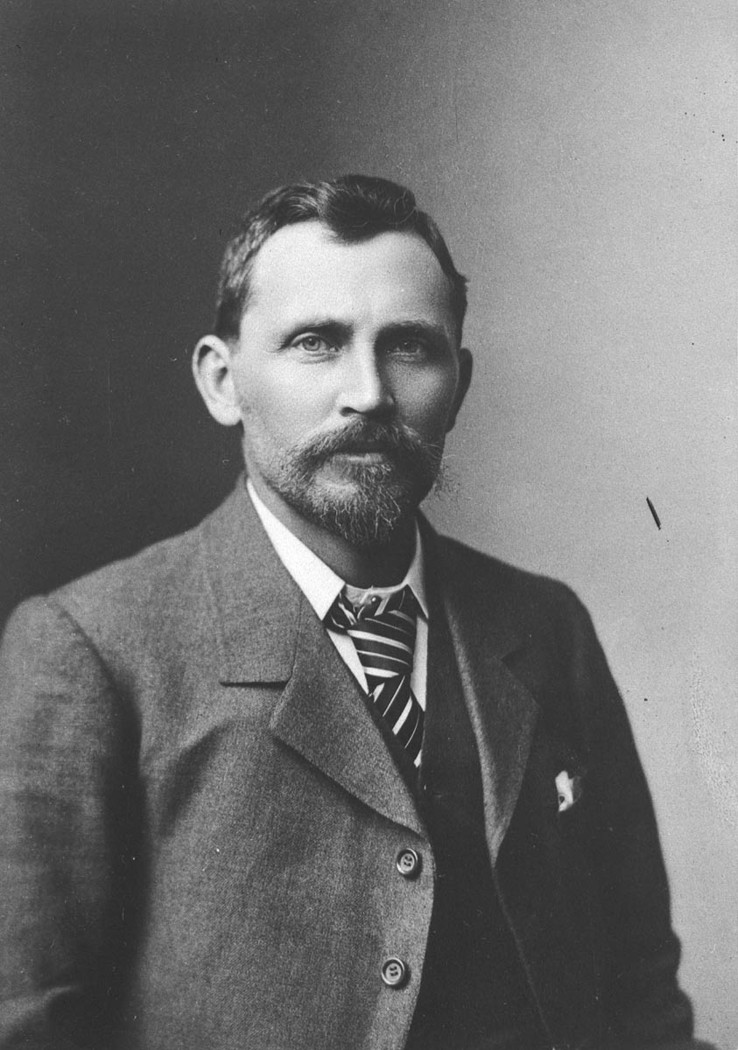
- John Cann in 1902

25th Chief Secretary of New South Wales
- In office 29 January 1914 – 15 March 1915
- Premier: William Holman
- Preceded by: William Holman
- Succeeded by: George Black

32nd Treasurer of New South Wales
- In office 6 May 1912 – 29 January 1914
- Premier: James McGowen; William Holman
- Preceded by: Campbell Carmichael
- Succeeded by: William Holman

Member of the New South Wales Legislative Assembly for Sturt
- In office 20 June 1891 – 25 June 1894
- Preceded by: Wyman Brown
- Succeeded by: William John Ferguson
- In office 15 November 1913 – 20 December 1916
- Preceded by: Arthur Hill Griffith
- Succeeded by: Percy Brookfield

Member of the New South Wales Legislative Assembly for Broken Hill
- In office 17 July 1894 – 6 November 1913
- Preceded by: New district
- Succeeded by: District abolished

Personal details
- Born: 19 April 1860 Horrabridge, Devonshire, England
- Died: 21 July 1940 (aged 80) Petersham, New South Wales, Australia
- Resting place: Rookwood Independent
- Party: Labor Party
- Spouse: Eliza Ann Callard (1885–1930)
- Relations: George Cann
- Children: None
- Occupation: Miner

John Henry Cann (19 April 1860 – 21 July 1940) was a New South Wales politician, Treasurer, and Minister of the Crown in the cabinets of James McGowen and William Holman.

== Background ==
Cann was born in 1860 in Horrabridge, moving with his family to Northumberland in 1866. At the age of nine he began work in the coal mines. He moved to London in 1882 and migrated to Australia in 1887 following his marriage in 1885. After a brief period working as a coal miner at Port Kembla Cann moved to Broken Hill where he worked as a miner for BHP. He was also a Primitive Methodist lay preacher at this time.

== Political career ==
Cann was elected president of the local branch of the Amalgamated Miners' Association (AMA) in early 1890, defeating the more radical previous president, Richard Sleath. When the AMA formed a local branch of the Labor Electoral League in 1891 Cann was preselected as candidate for the state parliament seat of Sturt and elected in the same year. Cann was elected unopposed as the sitting member, Wyman Brown, decided to retire after local unions passed a motion of no confidence in him. Other labour candidates including Sleath (then serving as AMA secretary) and William Ferguson (supported by the Barrier Ranges Trades and Labour Council) withdrew from the contest once it was clear Cann had the majority support of local unions.

Cann faced significant local problems once elected. The far west of New South Wales was in a severe drought, and Broken Hill had no secure source of fresh water. Cann was able to persuade the Premier, Henry Parkes, to commission emergency supplies of water brought in from South Australia by train.

An even more significant problem emerged with the defeat of the local union movement in the 1892 miners' strike. The 18-week strike saw local union leaders arrested and imprisoned in Sydney and strikebreakers brought in to replace striking miners. Union membership collapsed following the defeat and many of the working conditions won in previous years were lost.

While the defeat of the strike was a significant setback for the unions in Broken Hill, politically Labour was very successful in the 1890s. Cann was able to persuade the Dibbs government to divide the district of Sturt into three new seats, Alma, Broken Hill and a redrawn Sturt. Labour polled over 70 percent in all three new seats at the 1894 election, with Cann winning Broken Hill.

Cann served as Labor's central campaign director for the 1897 election to the Federation Convention. Labor opposed the 1897 federation proposal, instead advocating a unicameral legislature elected by universal suffrage. This opposition to federation was controversial locally, and although the "No" vote was successful, it caused significant internal conflict within the Labor party in the far west. When Labor won the 1910 election, Cann was elected Speaker of the Legislative Assembly. Cann resigned as speaker as part of the political crisis caused by the resignations of Bill Dunn and Henry Horne, causing Labor to lose its majority. Parliament was porouged and on its resumption, Liberal Reform member Henry Willis was elected speaker and restoring Labor's majority.

Cann continued to serve as MLA for Broken Hill until the seat was abolished in 1913, when he returned to the seat of Sturt. From 1912 to 1914 he was the Treasurer of New South Wales. In 1916 Cann was expelled from the Labor Party during the 1916 Labor split, and resigned to take the position of deputy chief commissioner of the New South Wales Government Railways. He was succeeded as the member for Sturt by the more radical Percy Brookfield.

In 1914 his younger brother George joined him in the legislative Assembly, winning the 1914 Canterbury state by-election.

New South Wales Legislative Assembly
Preceded by Wyman Brown	Member for Sturt; 1891–1894	Succeeded by William John Ferguson
New district	Member for Broken Hill; 1894–1913	District abolished
Preceded by Arthur Hill Griffith	Member for Sturt; 1913–1917	Succeeded by Percy Brookfield
Preceded by William McCourt	Speaker of the New South Wales Legislative Assembly; 1910–1911	Succeeded by Henry Willis
Political offices
Preceded by Campbell Carmichael	Treasurer of New South Wales; 1912–1914	Succeeded by William Holman
Preceded by William Holman	Chief Secretary of New South Wales; 1914–1915	Succeeded by George Black
Preceded by John Treflé	Secretary for Mines; 1914–1915	Succeeded by Alfred Edden
Preceded by Fred Flowers	Secretary for Public Works; 1915–1916	Succeeded by Arthur Griffith
