= Edward Dickens =

Son of Charles Dickens

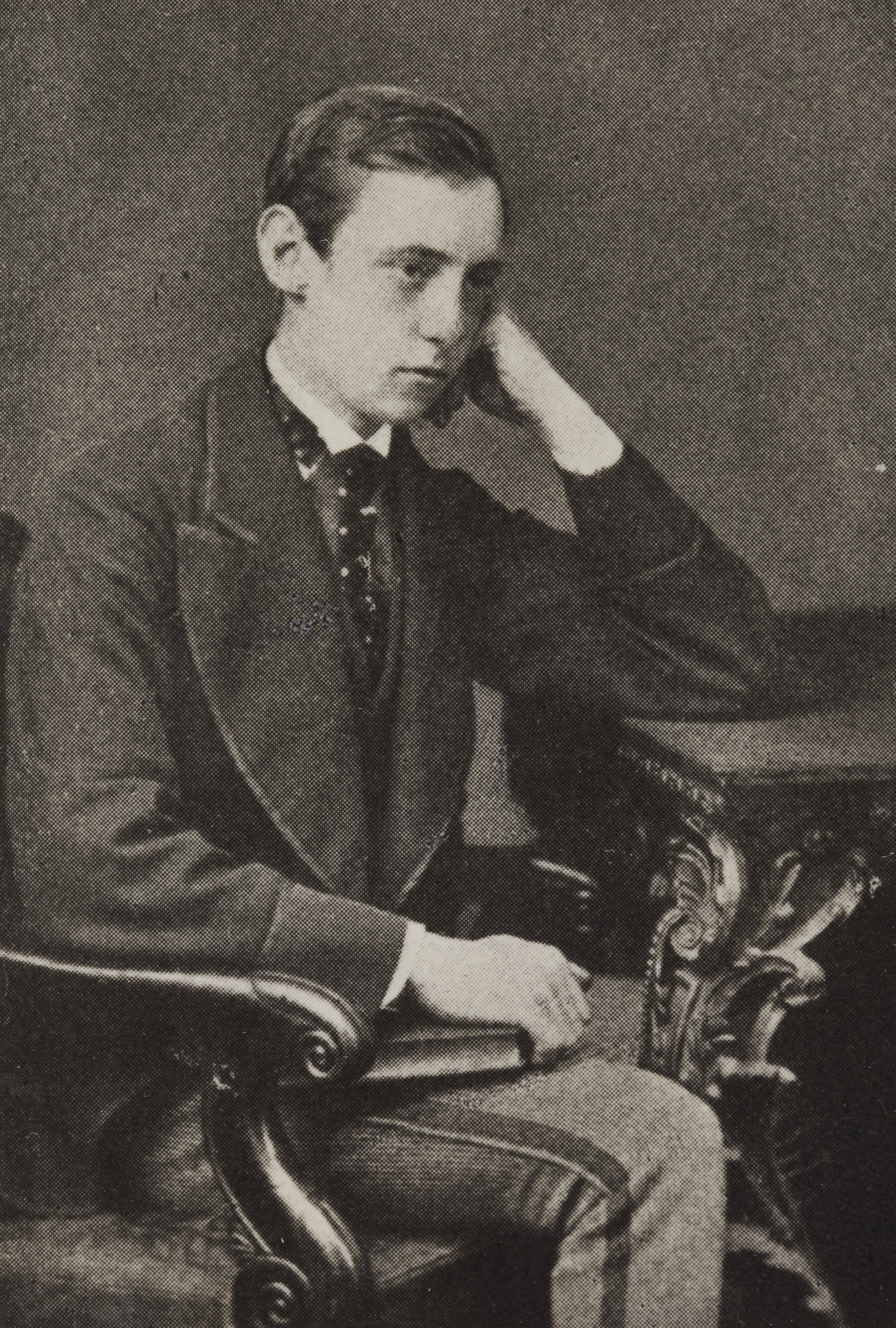
- Edward Bulwer Lytton Dickens in 1868

Member of the New South Wales Legislative Assembly
- In office 13 February 1889 – 25 June 1894
- Preceded by: New seat
- Succeeded by: Richard Sleath
- Constituency: Wilcannia

Personal details
- Born: 13 March 1852 London, England
- Died: 23 January 1902 (aged 49) Moree, New South Wales, Australia
- Spouse: Constance Desailly (m. 1880)
- Relations: Six brothers and three sisters
- Parent(s): Charles Dickens; Catherine Dickens

Edward Bulwer Lytton Dickens (13 March 1852 – 23 January 1902) was the youngest son of English novelist Charles Dickens and his wife Catherine. He emigrated to Australia at the age of 16, and eventually entered politics, serving as a member of the New South Wales Legislative Assembly from 1889 to 1894. He died at the age of 49 after a period of illness.

== Early life ==
Dickens was named after his godfather, novelist Edward Bulwer-Lytton, and educated at Tunbridge Wells in Kent at a private school owned by the Reverend W. C. Sawyer, later Anglican bishop of Armidale and Grafton. He also attended lectures at the Royal Agricultural College in Cirencester, Gloucestershire. He was nicknamed "the Plornishghenter" as a baby, which was shortened to "Plornish" and then "Plorn".

== Move to Australia ==
Charles Dickens encouraged Edward, along with his elder brother Alfred D'Orsay Tennyson Dickens, to migrate to Australia, which he saw as a land of opportunity. Alfred migrated in 1865 and Edward in 1868. Edward arrived at Momba Station just before his sixteenth birthday. Dickens settled at Wilcannia, New South Wales, where he became manager of Mount Murchison Station (part of Momba). He married Constance Desailly, the daughter of a local property owner, in 1880. He opened a stock and station agency, was elected as an alderman of Bourke Shire Council and bought a share in Yanda station near Bourke. He lost heavily from bad seasons and in 1886 was appointed government inspector of runs in the Bourke District. He was never able to pay back a loan of £800 from his most successful brother, Henry.

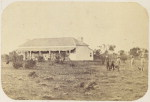
Momba House at Momba Station c. 1870

== Parliament ==
Dickens was nominated for the seat of Wentworth at the 1882 by-election, but withdrew before the polls, won by fellow pastoralist Edward Quin. He was then elected member for Wilcannia in the New South Wales Legislative Assembly in 1889, as a Protectionist Party candidate, and held the seat until he was defeated by Labor Party candidate Richard Sleath in 1894.

== Later life ==
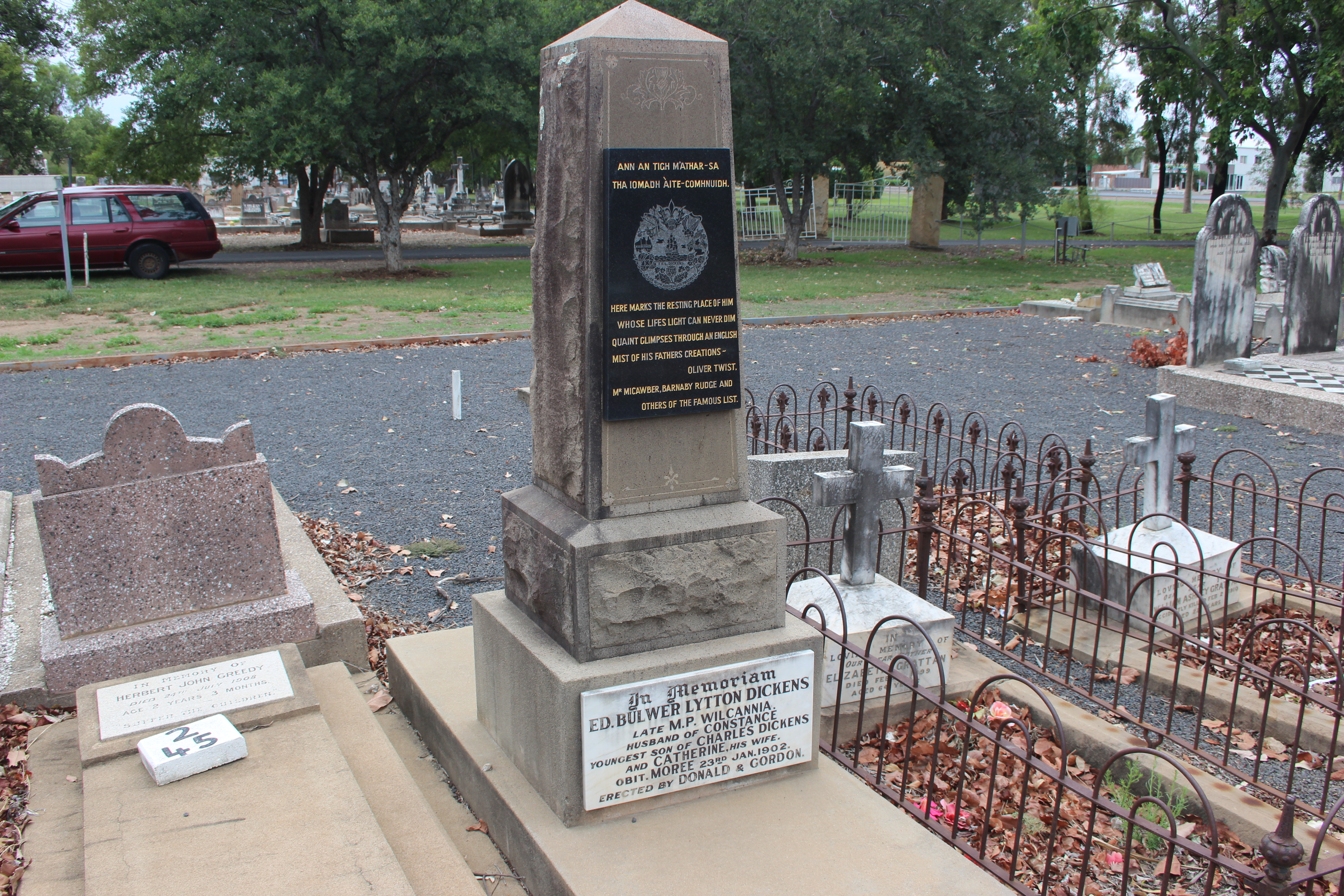
Dickens's grave in Moree

Dickens then became a rabbit inspector for the Government of New South Wales, then an officer for the Lands Department in charge of the Moree district. He died in Moree in 1902, and was buried in Moree Cemetery.

== Literary portrayals ==
Thomas Keneally's 2020 novel The Dickens Boy (Sceptre, ISBN 978-1529345070) is a fictionalised account of Edward Dickens' life.

== See also ==
- Dickens family

== Notes ==
New South Wales Legislative Assembly
New seat	Member for Wilcannia; 1889–1894	Succeeded by Richard Sleath
