= John Meehan (Australian politician) =

Australian politician

John Charles Meehan (6 February 1864 – 15 February 1930) was an Irish-born Australian politician.

He was born in Ballyconnell to John Meehan and Mary McAdam. He arrived in Queensland around 1878, working as a woodcutter at Charters Towers and then as a shearer in the western districts. He was involved in the formation of the Queensland Shearers' and Labourers' Union, and was that body's delegate to the formation of the Australian Workers' Union (AWU). On 21 July 1890 he married Clara Mary Theresa O'Reilly; they had a son. Meehan moved to New South Wales around 1895, working as a shearer, miner and drover and as an AWU delegate in Wilcannia and Bourke. In 1904 he was elected to the New South Wales Legislative Assembly as the Labor member for Darling. He held the seat until it was abolished in 1913, and he retired from parliament. He then moved to Ballarat, where he became secretary of the AWU's Victoria Riverina branch. From 1927 to 1930 he was assistant secretary of the AWU's Sydney head office. He died in Woollahra in 1930.

New South Wales Legislative Assembly
New seat	Member for Darling; 1904–1913	Abolished
