= Barrier Daily Truth =

Former newspaper in New South Wales

- Type: Daily newspaper
- Format: Tabloid
- Owner(s): Barrier Industrial Council
- Editor: Tony Bosworth
- Founded: 1897
- Ceased publication: 2024
- Headquarters: 179 Blende Street, Broken Hill, NSW, Australia
- Website: barriertruth.com.au

The Barrier Daily Truth was a local newspaper for the mining town of Broken Hill in New South Wales, Australia.

It covered a range of stories that affect local residents, including industrial news relating to the mines and stories submitted by readers such as local sport stories. The paper also covered national news events of importance. It was owned by the Barrier Industrial Council and was one of the few small newspapers in Australia to remain locally owned.

== History ==
The Barrier Truth started in 1898 as a weekly English language news sheet. It was printed by Thomas Nicholls, for the proprietor Nicholas James Buzacott from 1898 to 1908. Initially it was printed in Adelaide until 10 September 1898 and it began to be printed locally in Broken Hill.

In 1899 the news sheet format was abandoned in favour of a proper newspaper, and in July 1899 the newspaper became owned by the Barrier District Australasian Labor Federation and was published by William Arthur Jones. At this time it became the official organ of the Barrier District Council of the Australian Labor Federation. Later the owner became the Barrier Industrial Council.

Between 1899 and 1902 the paper published very little other than local news and general Labour news. In 1902 a women's section was added to the paper, and sporting news and racing results were also included in the paper. This had the effect of doubling the paper's circulation in about nine months.

The paper changed its name to the Barrier Daily Truth in 1908 and Volume 1, number 1 under the new title was published on 2 November 1908. The masthead on that first issue reads: Barrier Daily Truth with which is incorporated the Barrier Truth, established 1898. At this time the paper also changed from a weekly to a daily publication.

Construction began on the building in which the Barrier Daily Truth currently resides on 31 October 1904. It was completed in February 1905 and a second story added in 1908. In the late 1970s the building was refurbished to house a modern offset press.

From 1941 to 1951 the Barrier Daily Truth also published Wilcannia's weekly newspaper Western Grazier.

On Saturday, 28 March 2020, within the context of the COVID-19 pandemic, the Barrier Daily Truth suspended daily publication. Staff volunteered to produce a weekly newspaper and then received payment via the Australian Government's Jobkeeper program.

At his retirement in 2021, long-time journalist Craig Brealey noted the significance of the newspaper's reporting on the water management issues in the Darling River (Baaka).

In 2023, the newspaper added a delivery fee to help combat rising costs, but it caused some discontent among long-time subscribers. By March 2024, the paper had reduced its output by four pages per edition due to staffing shortages. A month later the paper was shuttered. Budget reasons were part of the closure, as the newspaper's local printing press broke down in March 2024, which created extra costs for the paper's printing in Mildura and subsequent transport to Broken Hill.

== Digitisation ==
Some issues of the paper published in 1908, and many issues published between 1941 and 1954 have been digitised as part of the Australian Newspapers Digitisation Program, a project of the National Library of Australia in cooperation with the State Library of New South Wales.
