= Ted Horsington =

Australian politician (1878–1947)

Secretary for Lands
- In office 27 May 1927 – 18 October 1927

Minister for Forests
- In office 27 May 1927 – 18 October 1927

Member of the New South Wales Parliament for Sturt
- In office 20 September 1922 – 29 March 1947 Serving with Mat Davidson (1922-1927); Brian Doe (1922-1927)
- Preceded by: Jabez Wright
- Succeeded by: William Wattison

Personal details
- Born: Edward Matthew Horsington; 2 May 1878 Timor, Victoria
- Died: 23 July 1947 (aged 69) Waverley, New South Wales
- Resting place: South Head Cemetery
- Party: Labor Party
- Other political affiliations: Industrial Labor Party
- Spouse: Rosalie S. Bryksky
- Occupation: Drover, Miner

Edward Matthew Horsington (2 May 1878 – 23 July 1947) was an Australian politician.

== Biography ==
He was born at Lower Alma, Timor, Victoria, to Julia, née Farrell, of Portarlington, Ireland, and farmer John Waygood Horsington, of Somerset, England.

John Waygood Horsington, his two sisters and their mother had survived the 1852 Ticonderoga fever-ship disaster, but John's father had been amongst the 100 who had been buried at sea, before the onshore makeshift quarantine ordeal when another 80 died.

In Victoria, John had tried shoemaking in Brunswick, in partnership with his brother James, gold mining in the Maryborough area, and whilst farming at Lower Alma, floated a gold-mining company, the Horsington Freehold Claim, which was financially unsuccessful.

Edward, known as "Ted", was John's eighth child, and Julia's fourth. While various references, including Who's Who in Australia 1947, state that Edward was educated in Maryborough, it is much more likely that he attended one of the rural schools which offered classes up to eighth grade, much closer to his home at Lower Alma, in the Maryborough district.

Horsington's entry in the 1947 “Who’s Who in Australia” recorded that his recreation was gardening.

=== Career ===
He became a drover and miner after leaving school and worked in Queensland, New South Wales and Western Australia before settling in Broken Hill. On 31 December 1906 he married Rosalie Bryksky, with whom he had two daughters, one who died aged 10 years, the other being widowed after five years of marriage and later remarrying.

From 1912 to 1922, Horsington was secretary of the Broken Hill branch of the Federated Engine Drivers and Firemen's Union. He also served as director of Broken Hill Hospital and as a Broken Hill City Alderman.

==== Political career ====
In 1922, Horsington was elected to the New South Wales Legislative Assembly as one of the Labor members for Sturt. He continued as member for Sturt after the return of single-member divisions in 1927, and briefly served as Secretary for Lands and Minister for Forests from May to October 1927. He was expelled from the Labor Party in 1936 but readmitted later that year, and in June 1939 joined Bob Heffron's Industrial Labor Party. The ILP was reintegrated into the official Labor Party in August of that year, and Horsington continued to represent Sturt until he retired in 1947.

Horsington is well-represented in newspapers now online in the National Library of Australia's TROVE at www.trove.nla.gov.au. During the debate to proceed with amending the Bill for Compensation for diseased Broken Hill miners, Horsington directed language towards the Premier which was "worthy of censure" and was removed from the Chamber.

=== Death and legacy ===
He died at Waverley in Sydney on 23 July of that year. A large number of New South Wales newspapers reported his passing.

On 24 July 1947, the Barrier Miner, a Broken Hill newspaper, published:

MR HORSINGTON DIES IN SYDNEY

Former member for Sturt in the State Parliament, Mr. Edward Matthew Horsington, died at Waverley Memorial Hospital, Sydney, yesterday. He was 69. Born and educated at Maryborough, Victoria, Mr. Horsington worked on pastoral properties and, on mines in Queensland, Western Australia, and New South Wales before entering the State Parliament over 24 years ago. He was prominent in local union circles before Parliamentary election and was Secretary of the local branch of the F.E.D. and F.A. for some years. An extremely popular official, he took part in the civic life of the city and served as a city alderman. During nearly a quarter of a century in the State Parliament as member for Sturt, Mr. Horsington was a keen advocate of the needs of the people of the West. He never wavered in his advocacy of the Darling River Water Scheme, and at the ceremony connected with the turning of the first sod visiting Parliamentarians paid a tribute to his work. During his long term in Parliament, Mr. Horsington was only elected unopposed on one occasion".

A much more detailed obituary appeared in the Barrier Daily Truth (Broken Hill), Thursday 24 July 1947, page 3.

Edward Matthew Horsington's remains were buried in the South Head Cemetery, Vaucluse, Waverley Council, New South Wales, joining those of his wife, Rosalie, who had died nearly a year before him.

In September 1951, a section of the Silverton Highway on the outskirts of Broken Hill, was named Horsington Drive, to commemorate his work, and 180 trees donated by industry were planted as an avenue. Whilst the trees appear not to have survived, the stone cairn related to the naming and planting remains in situ.

New South Wales Legislative Assembly
| Preceded by Jabez Wright | Member for Sturt; 1922–1947; Served alongside: Davidson, Doe; none | Succeeded by William Wattison |
Political offices
| Preceded by Jack Lang | Secretary of Lands; 1927 – 1927 | Succeeded by Richard Ball |
| Preceded by Jack Lang | Minister for Forests; 1927 – 1927 | Succeeded by Frank Chaffey |
