= Electoral district of Willyama =

Former state electoral district of New South Wales, Australia

Willyama was an electoral district for the Legislative Assembly in the Australian State of New South Wales named after the original aboriginal name for the Broken Hill area. It included southern Broken Hill and sparsely occupied areas further south. Since 1904 all of the town was in the district of Broken Hill, surrounded by the rural district of Sturt. In the 1912 redistribution north Broken Hill was in Sturt, while Willyama was created to include South Broken Hill, the southern part of Sturt and the north western part of Murray. In 1920, it was combined with Sturt, Cobar and much of the area of Murray to create a three-member Sturt. Willyama's only member was Jabez Wright representing Labor.

== Members for Willyama ==
Member	Party	Term
Jabez Wright	Labor	1913–1920

== Election results ==
1917 New South Wales state election: Willyama
Party	Candidate	Votes	%	±%
Labor	Jabez Wright	3,381	64.6	−8.7
Ind. Nationalist	Brian Doe	1,851	35.4	+35.4
Total formal votes		5,232	99.5	+1.8
Informal votes		24	0.5	−1.8
Turnout		5,256	59.2	−3.6
Labor hold		Swing	−8.7	
