= Percy Brookfield =

Australian politician

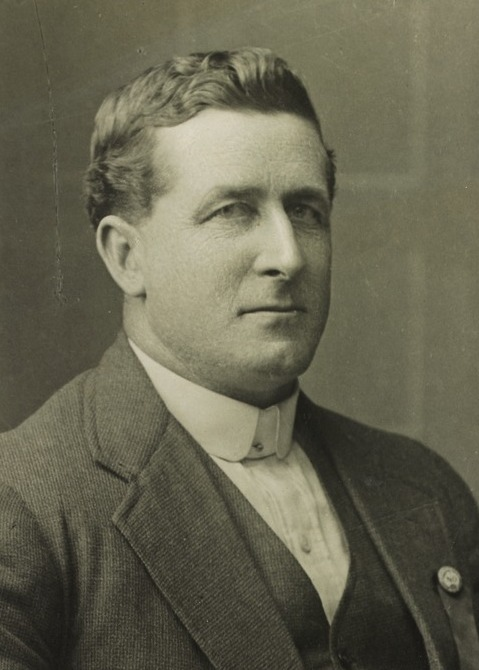
- Percy Brookfield in 1915

Member of the New South Wales Legislative Assembly for Sturt
- In office 3 February 1917 – 22 March 1921 Serving with Mat Davidson and Brian Doe
- Preceded by: John Cann
- Succeeded by: Jabez Wright

Personal details
- Born: Percival Stanley Brookfield; 7 August 1875 Wavertree, Lancashire, England
- Died: 22 March 1921 (aged 45) Adelaide, South Australia, Australia
- Resting place: Broken Hill Cemetery
- Party: Labor
- Other political affiliations: ISLP; Socialist Labor
- Occupation: Miner

Percival Stanley Brookfield (7 August 1875 – 22 March 1921) was an Australian politician and militant trade unionist. He was variously known as Percival Jack Brookfield or Jack Brookfield, a member of the New South Wales Legislative Assembly from 1917 until his violent death in 1921. In parliament he was a member of the Labor Party (ALP) until July 1919 and then joined the Industrial Socialist Labor Party.

== Early life ==
Brookfield was born in Wavertree, Lancashire, England, the son of a local grocer Cuthbert Brookfield and Jane Brookfield (née Peers) and after an elementary education went to sea at age 13. After spending about 6 years at sea working on various merchant ships, at his request he was discharged from his service on the vessel "Godiva", with an endorsement of good conduct, in Port Melbourne in 1894. He was a swagman and prospector in New South Wales and Queensland but had settled in Broken Hill by 1910. He became an official of the Amalgamated Miners' Association and led the Broken Hill campaign against the introduction of conscription. He was gaoled and reportedly fined £700 as a result of his anti-conscription activities.

== State Politics ==
In February 1917 he won ALP pre-selection for a by-election in the seat of Sturt. The by-election had been caused by the resignation of the previous member John Cann who had accepted the position of Railways Commissioner. Brookfield won the seat with 54% of the primary vote and increased this to 57% at the general election that was held one month later. In parliament he became a leading left-wing advocate and expressed sympathy for the Industrial Workers of the World and the Bolshevik Revolution. His radicalism led him into conflict with the rest of the ALP caucus and he resigned from it in July 1919. He was not readmitted to the party when he attempted to retract his resignation. He later then joined the Industrial Socialist Labor Party.

At the March 1920 state elections Brookfield contested the seat of Sturt for the Socialist Labor Party after its amalgamation with the Industrial Socialist Labor Party, and, under the multi-member proportional representation system then used, he was the first candidate elected with 27% of the primary vote. Following the election, he held the balance of power in the assembly. He supported the Labor government of John Storey and used his position to improve industrial conditions for Broken Hill miners and to overturn the convictions of Australian IWW members gaoled in 1916.

In February 1921, Brookfield and several other members left the Socialist Labor Party to reform the independent Industrial Socialist Labor Party.

== Death ==
Brookfield died as a result of wounds received when trying to disarm a deranged Russian emigre, Koorman Tomayoff, at the Riverton railway station in South Australia on 22 March 1921. While it has been claimed that Brookfield was the only Australian politician murdered prior to the death of John Newman in 1994, another member of the Legislative Assembly, Thomas John Ley, probably murdered fellow member Hyman Goldstein in 1927. There is no evidence of a political motive in Brookfield's death.

On the same train that had stopped at Riverton S.A. was Constable Edmund A. Kinsela of the New South Wales Police Force. The Constable was transferring from Broken Hill to Culcairn in the Wagga Wagga District. Constable Kinsela effected the arrest of Koorman Tomayoff after an extended physical confrontation. The South Australian Governor, Sir Archibald Weigall met with Constable Kinsela the following day and warmly congratulated him on his heroism.

== Constable Kinsela's account ==
The Barrier Miner on Wednesday 23 March 1921 reports...

CONSTABLE KINSELA'S STORY

"I owe him my life"

Constable E.A. Kinsela's story is perhaps the most complete record of a shooting occurrence at Riverton yesterday. He has been transferred from Broken Hill Police Station to Culcairn, New South Wales, and was on his way to Culcairn.

Constable Kinsela said: I was having breakfast in the Riverton refreshment room when I heard two reports. A women rushed in and said that a man was firing a revolver and had shot a man and a woman.

Someone shut the door, but it was opened again, and I walked out onto the platform. Tomayeff was then in a paddock at the north end of the station and he went to a bag which he had with him and evidently recharged his revolver. I could see that discretion was required to deal with such a situation. Tomayeff did not stop firing, and I then went to the compartment in which I was travelling for my revolver. It was loaded in five chambers. Someone said, 'Let him have it', and I fired but only three of the cartridges went off and they took no effect. The man kept firing at me, and I went to the other side of the train with a view of coming up behind him.

The train was then pulled out of the station, and I got behind some bushes. Tomayeff again fired at me, and I ran towards the platform and ducked. I got back to the refreshment room and asked for some revolver bullets, but could not get any more. The late Mr Brookfield was then at the door of the refreshment room and looked out. The Russian came along the platform and fired at the door. One shot nearly hit Mr Brookfield. I suggested that our only chance was to wait until he had emptied his revolver, and then rush him. Mr Brookfield said to me 'Give me your revolver, and let me have a go at him.' I told him it was no good, as the two cartridges in it would not go off.

Mr Brookfield started out as the man appeared to be manipulating his weapon, and was going towards his bag. Tomayeff turned round when he saw us coming, and fired two or three more shots. The Russian was directing his attention to Mr Brookfield, who was holding my revolver in front of him, and I was on the outside, thinking to come up at the side of him. We struggled for some time, and the Russian freed himself. I succeeded in felling the Russian to the ground, however, and then I punched him on the face. When he was overpowered some civilians came to my assistance, and somebody with a rifle arrived and hit the Russian with the butt of it.

When I looked around Mr Brookfield was on the ground, and he said 'I'm done, I'm done.' Someone held the Russian down and I picked up the pistol and my revolver. I said to Mr Brookfield, 'Are you hurt?' and he replied 'Yes, I'm done, he has shot me.' After Constable Woodhead had taken Tomayeff away I looked at my automatic pistol and found that a cartridge had jammed in it. There were then five empty shells in my revolver, so that Mr Brookfield must have managed to fire two of the cartridges which previously would not go off.

I have to thank poor Mr Brookfield for my life. We both went out with our lives in our hands, but the Russian evidently concentrated on Mr Brookfield because he had the revolver. Nobody is more sorry at Mr Brookfield's fate than I am.

New South Wales Legislative Assembly
Preceded by John Cann	Member for Sturt; 1917–1921	Succeeded by Jabez Wright
