= John Sullivan (Australian politician) =

Australian politician

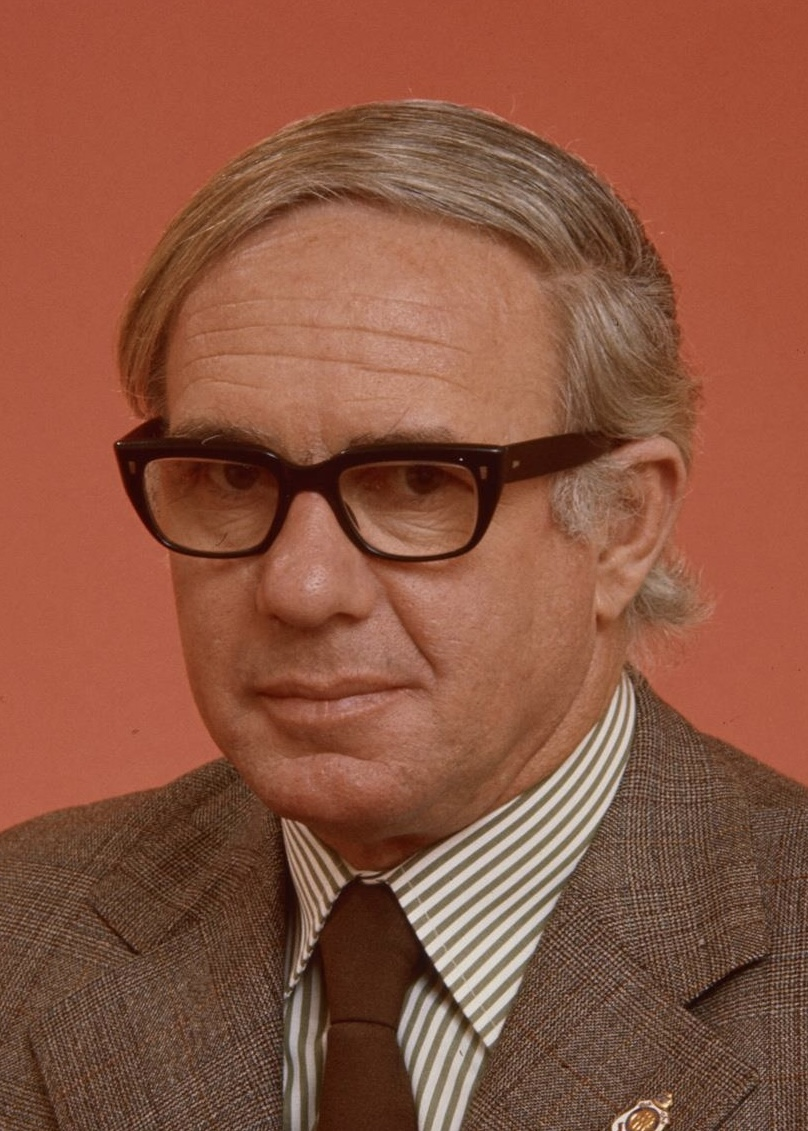
- Sullivan in 1974

Member of the Australian Parliament for Riverina
- In office 18 May 1974 – 10 December 1977
- Preceded by: Al Grassby
- Succeeded by: John FitzPatrick

Personal details
- Born: 7 February 1929 (age 97) Narrandera, New South Wales
- Party: National Party of Australia
- Spouse: Mollie O'Sullivan (m. 1955)
- Occupation: Soldier

John William Sullivan (born 7 February 1929) is an Australian former politician. He was a member of the House of Representatives from 1974 to 1977, holding the New South Wales seat of Riverina for the National Country Party. He later served in the New South Wales Legislative Assembly from 1980 to 1981.

== Early life ==
Sullivan was born on 7 February 1929 in Narrandera, New South Wales. His father Bill Sullivan was a local schoolteacher.

Sullivan was educated at Narrandera High School and St Patrick's College, Goulburn. As a teenager he witnessed the aftermath of the fatal crash of a Bristol Beaufighter departing from RAAF Base Narrandera, which killed seven people.

== Military service ==
Sullivan entered the military after leaving school and in 1948 was accepted into the Royal Military College, Duntroon. He graduated in 1951 and undertook further training with the 13th National Service Training Battalion, then served during the Korean War with the 1st and 2nd Battalions, Royal Australian Regiment. He took part in Operation Blaze and Operation Fauna with 1RAR in 1952, then spent a year in Japan as chief instructor at a battle school for Australian reinforcements.

In a 2020 interview with the Narrandera Argus for the 70th anniversary of the Korean War, Sullivan recalled: "It was mainly night warfare – I don't think we slept at night at all, it was basically patrolling or being shelled by the enemy. We had respect for the Chinese soldier, tough and he lived under terrible circumstances. We lived in trenches with bits of barb wire from shelling, bits of bodies around and rats. When you are young you accept that as part of life and get on with it."

Sullivan later served in Malaya and Vietnam, and as an instructor at the Army Recruit Training Centre. In 1971 he was the chief Australian adviser at the Jungle Warfare Training Centre in Nui Dat. He resigned from the army in February 1974 with the rank of lieutenant-colonel.

== Federal politics ==
Sullivan joined the Country Party in early 1974, having recently returned to Narrandera after retiring from the military. He unexpectedly won a preselection ballot for the federal seat of Riverina in April 1974, and according to The Bulletin was chosen as "a 'dark horse' over an established local".

At the 1974 federal election, Sullivan won Riverina from the incumbent Labor MP Al Grassby, the immigration minister in the Whitlam government. He presented himself as a "hard-line, no-nonsense" candidate, in one television advertisement stating "after 26 years in the Army, including service in Korea, Malaya and Vietnam, I find the country falling into the hands of bludgers and drop-outs". Grassby was also targeted by anti-immigration associations during the campaign, which Sullivan described as "racist" and stated did not originate in the electorate.

In his maiden speech, Sullivan attracted attention for his comments on welfare dependency. He condemned what he described as "handouts" to Indigenous Australians, which he said were discriminatory against white Australians. Sullivan was re-elected at the 1975 election, by which time his party had been renamed the National Country Party. He visited Indochina with Andrew Peacock and Ian Sinclair in April 1975 as part of a study tour and supported the resumption of Australian military aid to Cambodia and South Vietnam if requested by their governments. He served on the Joint Standing Committee on Foreign Affairs and Defence from 1976 to 1977.

Ahead of the 1977 federal election, a redistribution dramatically altered Riverina. The neighbouring seat of Darling, one of the few safe country seats for Labor, was abolished, and the bulk of its territory, including the Labor stronghold of Broken Hill, was merged into Riverina. Sullivan previously held Riverina with a comfortably safe majority of 11 percent, but the redistribution erased his majority and gave Labor a notional majority of two percent. Even though the Coalition was easily re-elected, Sullivan lost his seat to the former member for Darling, Labor's John FitzPatrick.

== State politics ==
Sullivan stood unsuccessfully for the NCP in Murrumbidgee at the 1978 New South Wales state election. He later served as the member for Sturt in the New South Wales Legislative Assembly from February to August 1981, winning the 1981 by-election caused by Tim Fischer's resignation to contest the 1980 by-election for the federal seat of Murray.

== Later life ==
In 2003, Sullivan was part of an Australian delegation that travelled to South Korea to mark the 50th anniversary of the end of the Korean War.

Sullivan was elected to the Narrandera Shire Council in 2004. He served as mayor of Narrandera from 2007 to 2008.

== Personal life ==
In 1955, Sullivan married Mollie O'Sullivan, with whom he had two sons and two daughters. His son John Michael Sullivan was killed in a motor vehicle accident in 1974, aged 18, a few months after his father's election to federal parliament.

Parliament of Australia
Preceded by Al Grassby	Member for Riverina; 1974–1977	Succeeded by John FitzPatrick
New South Wales Legislative Assembly
Preceded by Tim Fischer	Member for Sturt; 1981	Succeeded by Seat abolished
