= Bill Beckroge =

Australian politician

William Harmon Beckroge (born 10 December 1944) was an Australian politician. He was a member of the New South Wales Legislative Assembly from 1981 until 1999. He was a member of the ALP.

Beckroge was born in Toowoomba. He was educated at the University of New England and worked as a print, TV and radio journalist in Broken Hill. He won Labor Party pre-selection for the seat of Broken Hill before the general election of 1981. He subsequently won the seat replacing the previous member, Lew Johnstone, who retired. Beckroge served as the member until the seat was abolished prior to the 1999 election. Beckroge subsequently retired from public life.

New South Wales Legislative Assembly
Preceded by Lew Johnstone	Member for Broken Hill; 1981–1999	District abolished
