= Barrier Industrial Council =

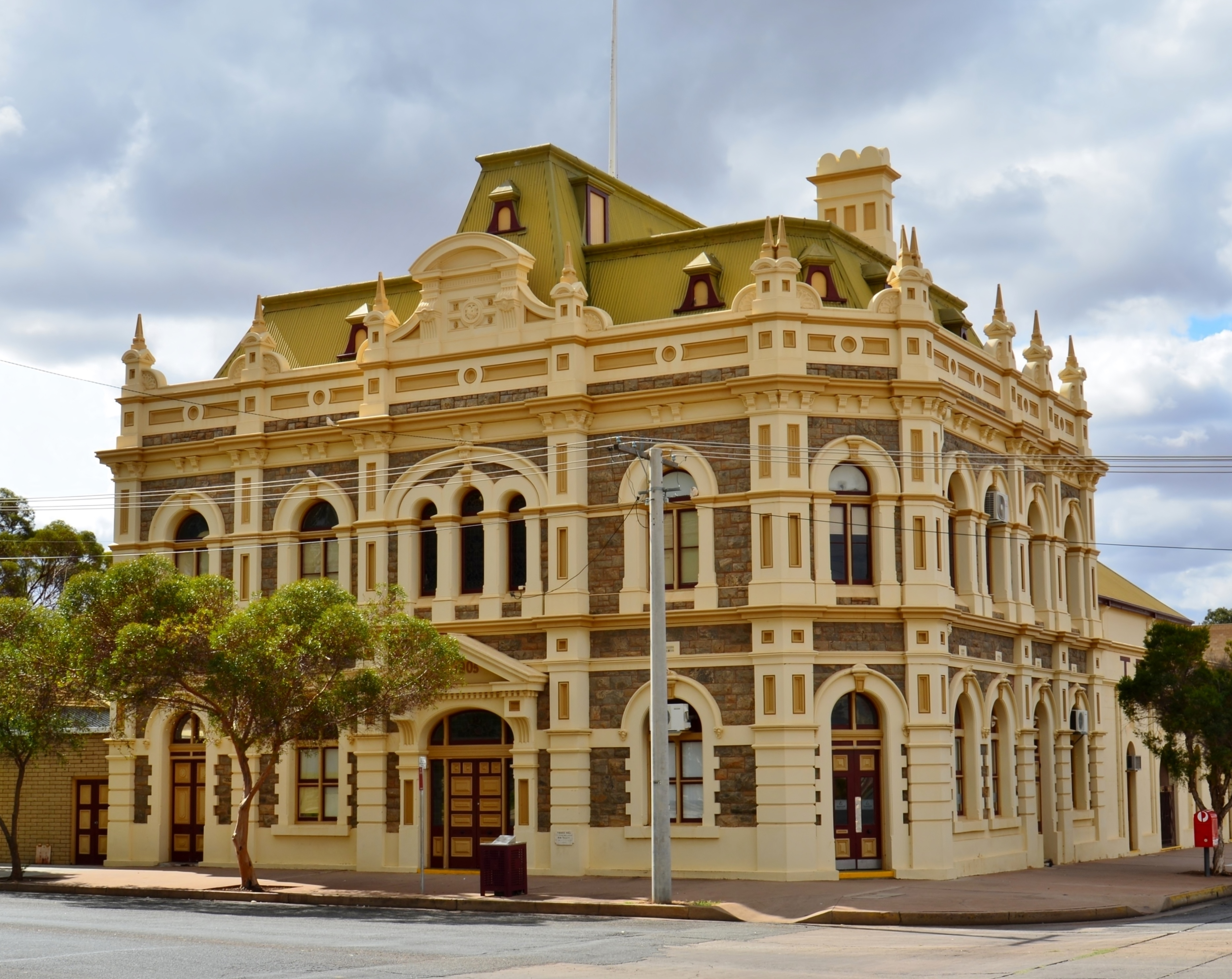
Trades Hall (1921) in Broken Hill

The Barrier Industrial Council (BIC) is the trades and labour council in Broken Hill, New South Wales, Australia, and surrounding areas. Formed in 1923 by 18 trade unions, the council has been unusually influential in local government, for a labour confederation. From 1899 to 2024, the BIC (and it's antecedents) also owned the predominant newspaper based in Broken Hill, the Barrier Daily Truth.

== History ==
The town of Broken Hill has had a turbulent industrial history since its formation, with the harsh working conditions in the mines forging a strong culture of union militancy. By 1890 nearly all workers at the Line of Lode mine, which was the only major source of employment in the town, were union members. The early years of the town were characterised by bitter industrial disputes and strikes in 1892, 1909 and 1919. The first attempt to establish a peak body to represent all trade unions in Broken Hill was in 1916 with the formation of the Broken Hill Trades and Labour Council. However, the dominant union in the town, the Amalgamated Miners' Association (AMA), did not join and some tradesmen's' unions were represented separately by the Iron Trades Council. In 1921 the AMA was renamed the Workers' Industrial Union of Australia and joined the Trades and Labour Council in 1923. The following year the council was renamed after the Barrier Ranges, first as the Barrier Industrial and Political Council and then as the Barrier Industrial Council (BIC). By the end of 1925 all the tradesmen's' unions had affiliated.

The BIC grew in power and influence over the 20th century as its control over the supply of labour in the isolated, and economically influential, town allowed it to dictate terms to both the mining companies and politicians in state government. The BIC's influence allowed it to greatly improve the conditions of workers in the town, who often received more generous entitlements than was standard for employees in the rest of Australia, such as a 35-hour working week and five weeks of annual leave.

One notable example of the BIC's influence in the town is the Badge Show Day. Established in 1923 the Badge Show Day is an event held four times a year in which union members march through the town wearing badge distributed by the BIC. During the period of compulsory unionism this acted as a way of ensuring that all workers were financial members of their relevant union as the individually numbered badges indicated which union they were a member, and which shift they worked on if they were miners.

In 1977, the BIC engaged in industrial action directed at the City of Broken Hill which culminated in the resignation of the city council, including mayor Noel Hicks, and the appointment of administrators by the state government. The conflict occurred when a council employee, Noel Latham, refused to pay a fine imposed by the BIC. As a result, other workers refused to work with Latham, "resulting in a two-week pile-up of garbage". The BIC then excluded Latham from its membership by refusing to issue him a badge and asked the city council to dismiss him. The council believed there was no legal grounds to dismiss Latham, as a result of which 97 council employees working in garbage collection, sanitation services and road works staged a walk-out.

The influence of the BIC has declined to some extent with the decline in mining employment in the city, as well as greater state and federal government regulation, but it is still an important organisation in local politics.
