= Electoral district of Broken Hill =

State electoral district of New South Wales, Australia

Broken Hill was an electoral district of the Legislative Assembly in the Australian state of New South Wales. It has had two incarnations, from 1894 to 1913 and from 1968 to 1999. The district is named after and included the town of Broken Hill, however it has not always included the town of South Broken Hill, previously known as Alma, or the surrounding district.

== Members for Broken Hill ==
First incarnation (1894–1913)
Member	Party	Term
John Cann	Labour	1894–1913
Second incarnation (1968–1999)
Member	Party	Term
Lew Johnstone	Labor	1968–1981
Bill Beckroge	Labor	1981–1999

== History ==
Prior to 1889 Broken Hill was part of the district of Wentworth. The population in Wentworth had grown significantly since the 1880 redistribution, especially as a result of the growth of mining at Broken Hill. Under the formula for seats, Wentworth was due to return 3 members. Because of the large area covered by the district, in 1889 it was split into 3, Wentworth, Sturt and Wilcannia. In 1894 Sturt became a rural district, with the towns of Broken Hill and Alma (now known as South Broken Hill) in the eponymous districts of Broken Hill and Alma. The 1903 New South Wales referendum required the number of members of the Legislative Assembly to be reduced from 125 to 90 and Broken Hill absorbed Alma for the 1904 election.

In the 1912 redistribution, the electoral district of Broken Hill was abolished and with the town absorbed into Sturt and South Broken Hill becoming part of the new district of Willyama. In 1920, Willyama, Sturt, Cobar and much of the area of Murray were combined to create a three-member Sturt, elected by proportional representation. In 1927, single-member electorates were recreated and the city of Broken Hill was split between Sturt and Murray. From 1932, the city of Broken Hill was split between Sturt and Cobar.

In 1968 Sturt was renamed Broken Hill and included all of the city of Broken Hill. In 1999, it was merged with part of Murray and renamed Murray-Darling.

== Election results ==
1995 New South Wales state election: Broken Hill
Party	Candidate	Votes	%	±%
Labor	Bill Beckroge	16,292	52.8	−0.4
National	Mark Kersten	13,236	42.9	+14.1
Independent	Gordon Dansie	1,324	4.3	+4.3
Total formal votes		30,852	94.2	+3.8
Informal votes		1,889	5.8	−3.8
Turnout		32,741	90.0	
Two-party-preferred result
Labor	Bill Beckroge	16,677	54.7	−5.3
National	Mark Kersten	13,804	45.3	+5.3
Labor hold		Swing	−5.3	
