= Charles Fern (politician) =

Australian politician (1884–1918)

Charles Stuart Fern (1 October 1884 – 18 April 1918) was a Labor Party politician who served as Member for Cobar in the New South Wales Legislative Assembly from 1911 to 1918.

== Background ==
Fern was born in Glebe to Scottish migrants James Fern, a gardener, and Elizabeth McIvor. He received a bursary to study at Marist Brothers College, North Sydney. At the age of eighteen he began work as a miner at Yerranderie, an occupation which would cause him to suffer from phthisis. He was an active member of the Amalgamated Miners' Association, serving as an organiser and secretary of the union, as well as representing it on the wages board.

In December 1911 Fern was elected to the NSW legislative assembly as member for the Electoral district of Cobar. He held the seat until his death in April 1918. In 1913 he served on the central executive of the ALP.

== World War I Service ==
A supporter of conscription in World War I, Fern joined the Universal Service League in 1915. He served as a member of the 17th and 16th Battalions of the Australian Imperial Force from 1915 to 1916, attaining the rank of Lance Corporal. He suffered from shellshock as a result of his service and was invalided home. He died at Lidcombe in 1918.

New South Wales Legislative Assembly
Preceded by William Spence	Member for Cobar; 1911–1918	Succeeded by Mat Davidson
