= Lew Johnstone =

Australian politician

Lewis Albert Johnstone (5 April 1916 – 11 May 1983) was an Australian politician. He was a Labor member of the New South Wales Legislative Assembly, representing Cobar from 1965 to 1968 and Broken Hill from 1968 to 1981.

Johnstone was born in Broken Hill to Charles Albert Johnstone, an underground mine manager, and Jessie Charlott Thueff. He was educated at public schools in the area and studied mine draughting and engineering. In 1936, the year he joined the Labor Party, he was employed with the North Broken Hill Mining Company, and became a member of the Broken Hill Miners' Union. He married Doris Jenkins on 26 June 1937, with whom he had two daughters. In 1941 he enlisted in the AIF, serving in Tobruk, Syria and El Alamein. He was discharged in January 1945. He continued to be active in the mining unions, serving as senior assistant secretary (1951–1953) and then secretary (1954–1965) of the Broken Hill union.

In 1965, when Ernest Wetherell, the Labor member for the state seat of Cobar, retired, Johnstone was selected as his replacement and won the seat. Cobar was abolished in 1968 and Johnstone successfully transferred to Broken Hill. He was elected unopposed in 1971, 1973 and 1976, and with a large margin in 1978. He retired from politics in 1981. He died in 1983 at Broken Hill.

New South Wales Legislative Assembly
Preceded by Ernest Wetherell	Member for Cobar; 1965–1968	Succeeded by Abolished
Preceded by New seat	Member for Broken Hill; 1968–1981	Succeeded by Bill Beckroge
