= William John Ferguson =

Australian politician

William Ferguson
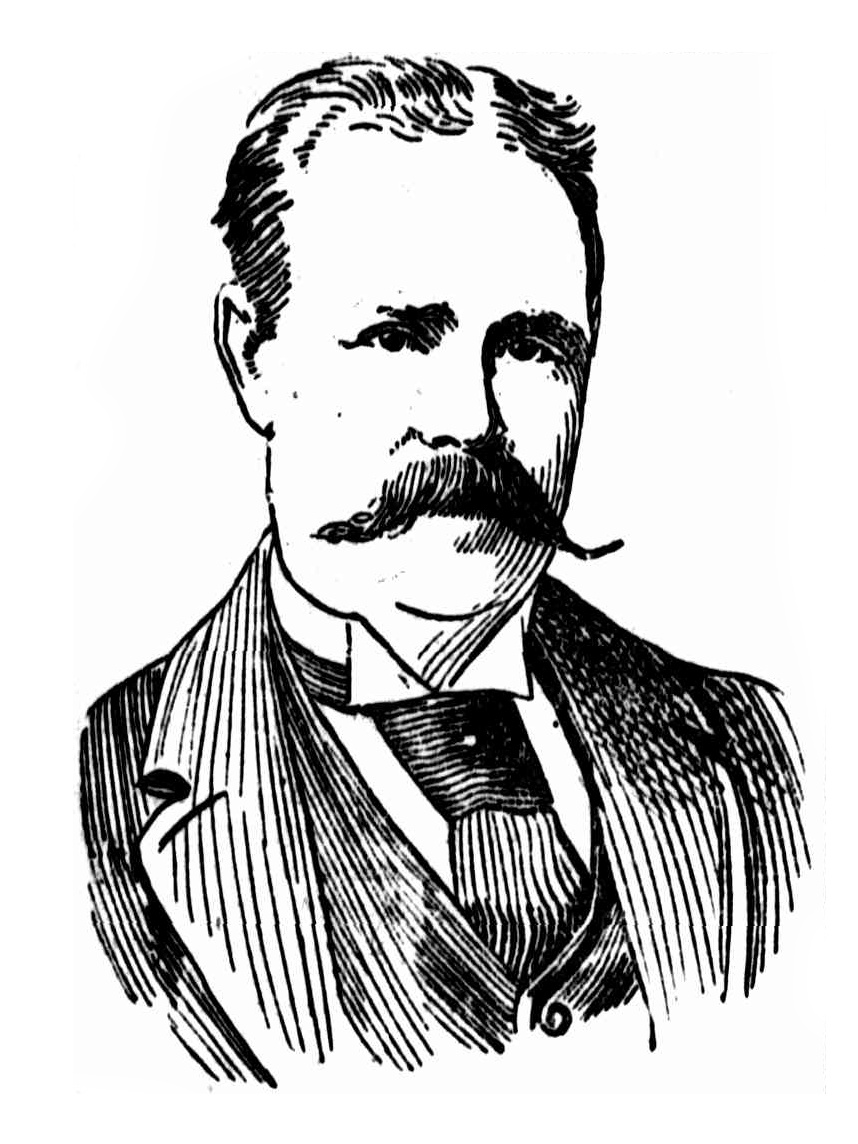
- in 1901

Member of the New South Wales Parliament for Sturt
- In office 17 July 1894 – 16 July 1904
- Preceded by: John Cann
- Succeeded by: Arthur Griffith

Personal details
- Born: William John Ferguson; 5 September 1859 Redruth, Colony of South Australia
- Died: 23 May 1935 (aged 75) Brisbane, Queensland
- Resting place: Toowong Cemetery
- Party: Labor Party
- Other political affiliations: Liberal Reform Party
- Spouse(s): Elizabeth Poole; Lily Gertrude Hanks
- Children: 7
- Occupation: Engine driver, Journalist

William John Ferguson (5 September 1859 – 23 May 1935) was an Australian politician.

Born in Redruth in South Australia to smelter James Boyce Ferguson and Barbara Robinson. He attended primary school before becoming an engine driver and journalist in South Australia's mining districts, subsequently moving to Broken Hill, where he married Elizabeth Poole (with whom he had seven children). He would later remarry on 8 December 1927 Lily Gertrude Hanks at Marrickville. In October 1892, following his involvement in the Broken Hill strike, Ferguson was gaoled for "conspiracy", and was released in July 1893. An early member of the Australian Workers' Union and the Political Labor League, Ferguson was elected to the New South Wales Legislative Assembly in 1894 as the member for Sturt. Although he became president of the local council of the Australian Labor Federation in 1899, Ferguson's independent behaviour in the Assembly led to his disendorsement in 1901; he was re-elected as an Independent Labor candidate in 1901 and was defeated as a Liberal in 1904. He later moved to Queensland, dying in Brisbane in 1935.

New South Wales Legislative Assembly
Preceded by John Cann	Member for Sturt; 1894 – 1904	Succeeded by Arthur Griffith
