= Electoral district of The Darling =

Former state electoral district of New South Wales, Australia

The Darling was an electoral district of the Legislative Assembly in the Australian state of New South Wales from 1904 to 1913, named after the Darling River. It was created in the 1904 re-distribution of electorates following the 1903 New South Wales referendum, which required the number of members of the Legislative Assembly to be reduced from 125 to 90, and consisted of Bourke and parts of The Barwon and Wilcannia. It was abolished in 1913 with most of the district going to Cobar and the balance to Sturt.

== Members for The Darling ==
Member	Party	Term
John Meehan	Labour	1904–1913

== Election results ==
1910 New South Wales state election: The Darling
Party	Candidate	Votes	%	±%
Labour	John Meehan	1,866	78.4	
Liberal Reform	William Shepherd	515	21.6	
Total formal votes		2,381	97.3	
Informal votes		66	2.70	
Turnout		2,447	48.4	
Labour hold				
