= Wyman Brown =

Australian politician

Wyman Brown (1836 – 7 November 1899) was an English-born Australian politician.

He was born at Deal in Kent to wood stapler John Brown and Sarah Finnis. He migrated to New South Wales in 1858, and became a miner on the Peel River. On 11 March 1863 he married Mary Ellen Smith; they had no children. From 1874 he was the Peel River's elected representative on the New South Wales Mining Board. In 1880 he became a warden at the goldfields, and from 1884 he was a police magistrate at Menindee, moving to Broken Hill the following year. In 1889 he was elected to the New South Wales Legislative Assembly as the Protectionist member for Sturt, but he did not contest the 1891 election. Brown died at Balmain in 1899.

New South Wales Legislative Assembly
New seat	Member for Sturt; 1889–1891	Succeeded by John Cann
