= Jabez Wright =

Australian politician (1852–1922)

14th Mayor of Broken Hill
- In office 16 February 1900 – 14 February 1901
- Preceded by: John Dunstan
- Succeeded by: William John Retallick

Alderman of the Municipality of Broken Hill
- In office 1896–1902

Member of the New South Wales Parliament for Willyama
- In office 6 December 1913 – 18 February 1920
- Preceded by: New Seat
- Succeeded by: Seat Abolished

Personal details
- Born: 25 March 1852 Greenwich, England
- Died: 10 September 1922 (aged 70) Bondi, New South Wales
- Resting place: Waverley Cemetery
- Party: Labor Party
- Spouse: Honora Kearney
- Children: 4
- Occupation: Carpenter, Undertaker

Jabez Wright (25 April 1852 – 10 September 1922) was an English-born Australian politician.

Wright was born at Greenwich in England, the son of Jabez Gladstone Wright. He worked in North and South America before moving to South Australia, eventually settling in Broken Hill around 1888. On 15 January 1878 Wright married Honora Kearney, with whom he had four children. He worked as a carpenter and then as an undertaker, and was a member of the Australian Workers' Union. From 1896 to 1902 Wright was an alderman at Broken Hill. He rose to be mayor from 1900 to 1901, the first Labor Mayor in the world. He was elected to the New South Wales Legislative Assembly in 1913 as the Labor member for Willyama. With the introduction of proportional representation in 1920 Wright was defeated running for Sturt, but filled the vacancy caused by the murder of Percy Brookfield in 1921. Wright himself caused a vacancy a year later when he died at Bondi.

Civic offices
Preceded by John Dunstan	Mayor of Broken Hill; 1900 – 1901	Succeeded by William John Retallick
New South Wales Legislative Assembly
New district	Member for Willyama; 1913 – 1920	District abolished
Preceded by Percy Brookfield	Member for Sturt; 1921 – 1922; Served alongside: Davidson, Doe	Succeeded by Ted Horsington
