= Electoral district of Sturt (New South Wales) =

Former state electoral district of New South Wales, Australia

Sturt was an electoral district of the Legislative Assembly in the Australian state of New South Wales in the Broken Hill area. It was a single member electorate from 1889 to 1920.

== Members for Sturt ==
Single-member (1889—1920)
Member	Party	Term						
Wyman Brown	Protectionist	1889–1891						
John Cann	Labor	1891–1894						
William Ferguson	Labor	1894–1901						
William Ferguson	Independent Labor	1901–1904						
William Ferguson	Liberal Reform	1904–1904						
Arthur Griffith	Labor	1904–1913						
John Cann	Labor	1913–1917						
Percy Brookfield	Labor	1917–1919						
Percy Brookfield	Ind. Socialist Labor	1919–1920						
Three members (1920—1927)
Member	Party	Term	Member	Party	Term	Member	Party	Term
Percy Brookfield	Socialist Labor	1920–1921	Mat Davidson	Labor	1920–1927	Brian Doe	Nationalist	1920–1927
Jabez Wright	Labor	1921–1922	Mat Davidson	Labor	1920–1927	Brian Doe	Nationalist	1920–1927
Ted Horsington	Labor	1922–1927	Mat Davidson	Labor	1920–1927	Brian Doe	Nationalist	1920–1927
Single-member (1927—1968)
Member	Party	Term						
Ted Horsington	Labor	1927–1939						
Ted Horsington	Industrial Labor	1939–1939						
Ted Horsington	Labor	1939–1947						
William Wattison	Labor	1947–1968						
Single-member (1971—1981)
Member	Party	Term						
Tim Fischer	National	1971–1980						
John Sullivan	National	1981						

== History ==
Prior to 1889 Broken Hill was part of the district of Wentworth. The population in Wentworth had grown significantly since the 1880 redistribution, especially as a result of the growth of mining at Broken Hill. Under the formula for seats, Wentworth was due to return 3 members. Because of the large area covered by the district, in 1889 it was split into 3, Wentworth, Sturt and Wilcannia. In 1894 Sturt became a rural district, with the towns of Broken Hill and Alma (now known as South Broken Hill) in the eponymous districts of Broken Hill and Alma. In 1904 Alma was absorbed into Broken Hill. At the 1912 redistribution Sturt was recast, absorbing north Broken Hill, and the western part of the abolished district of The Darling, including the town of Tibooburra. South Broken Hill, the southern part of Sturt were combined in the new district of Willyama, along with the north western part of Murray.

In 1920 Sturt was combined with Cobar, Willyama and much of the area of Murray to create a three-member electorate, elected by proportional representation. At the time it was one of the largest electoral districts in the world, said to be 121,000 square miles, with votes having to be brought sometimes 500 miles by the primitive transportation of the time to the central counting place. But proportional representation pundits as far away as Canada revelled in STV's successful implementation under such conditions.

In 1927, it became a single member electorate, but was renamed Broken Hill in 1968.

An entirely different district was created in 1971, containing the town of Narrandera and replacing parts of Albury, Murray, Murrumbidgee and Temora. It was abolished in 1981 and replaced by Albury, Lachlan, Murray, Murrumbidgee and Wagga Wagga.

== Election results ==
1981 Sturt by-election Saturday 21 February
Party	Candidate	Votes	%	±%
National Country	John Sullivan	11,614	63.1	−3.0
Labor	Michael Anthony	6,805	37.0	+3.0
Total formal votes		18,419	99.1	+0.5
Informal votes		165	0.9	−0.5
Turnout		18,584	82.6	−11.2
National Country hold		Swing	−3.0	

Tim Fischer (National Country) resigned to successfully contest the 1980 Murray by-election.
