= Mat Davidson =

Australian politician (1869–1949)

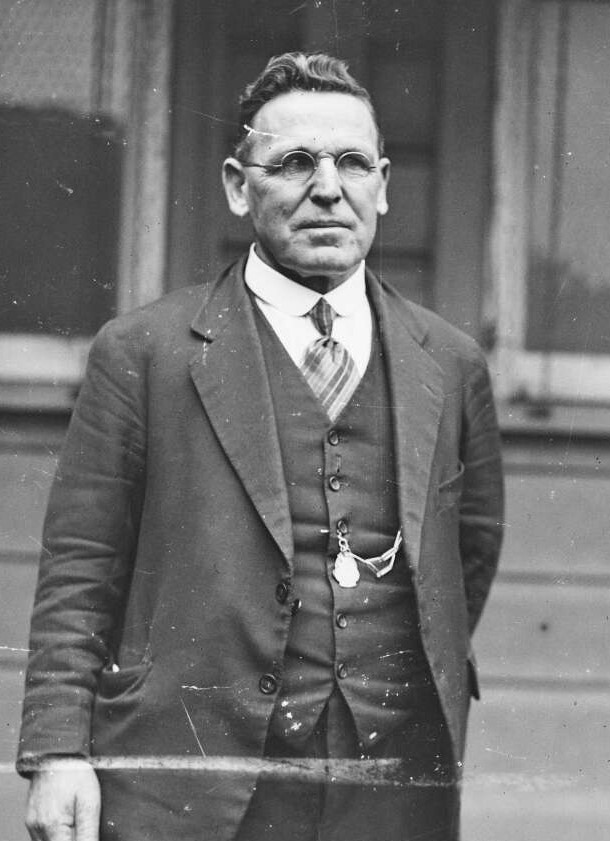

Secretary for Public Works
- In office 4 November 1930 – 13 May 1932

Member of the New South Wales Parliament for Cobar
- In office 11 May 1918 – 18 February 1920
- Preceded by: Charles Fern
- Succeeded by: Seat abolished

Member of the New South Wales Parliament for Sturt
- In office 20 March 1920 – 7 September 1927 Serving with Brian Doe (1920–1927); Percy Brookfield (1920–1921); Jabez Wright (1921–1922); Ted Horsington (1922–1927)
- Preceded by: Percy Brookfield
- Succeeded by: Ted Horsington

Member of the New South Wales Parliament for Murray
- In office 8 October 1927 – 18 September 1930
- Preceded by: Matthew Kilpatrick; Vern Goodin; Richard Ball
- Succeeded by: John Donovan

Member of the New South Wales Parliament for Cobar
- In office 25 October 1930 – 9 January 1949
- Preceded by: New Seat
- Succeeded by: Ernest Wetherell

Personal details
- Born: Charles Mark Anthony Davidson; 2 May 1869 Sydney
- Died: 9 January 1949 (aged 79) Little Bay, New South Wales
- Resting place: Northern Suburbs Roman Catholic Cemetery
- Party: Labor Party
- Spouse: Gertrude Mary Snape
- Occupation: Bushworker, Miner, Barber

Charles Mark Anthony "Mat" Davidson (2 May 1869 – 9 January 1949) was an Australian politician.

== Early life ==
Davidson was born in Sydney to James Davidson, a tailor from Edinburgh, and his wife Margaret. Davidson left school at 12 to begin an apprenticeship as a tailor, which he did not complete. After a short period working on a coastal vessel trading with the Pacific islands Davidson worked as a bushworker, shearer and tank sinker in the Monaro. He worked as miner from about 1888 to 1896 in Victoria, Broken Hill and Cobar. He lost an eye in a mining accident and became a tobacconist and barber in Cobar. He married Gertrude Mary Snape in July 1901 and they had three daughters and one son. Davidson was a foundation member of the Australian Workers' Union and helped to form a local branch of the Amalgamated Miners' Association in Cobar. He was active in local politics, being a member of the Political Labor League, the District Hospital Board, the racing club, the School of Arts and the Eight-Hour Day Sports committees. He also served as an alderman on the Cobar Municipal Council from 1913 to 1918, where he worked to promote railway extension.

== Parliamentary career ==
In 1918 Davidson was elected as a Labor Party member for Cobar in the New South Wales Legislative Assembly. With the introduction of proportional representation in 1920, the seat of Cobar was absorbed into Sturt and he was elected as one of its members. He served as Labor whip in the state parliament from 1923 to 1930. With the abolition of proportional representation in 1927, he was elected as the member for Murray. In 1930, following another redistribution, he was again elected as the member for Cobar. From November 1930 to May 1932 Davidson served as Secretary for Public Works in the Third Lang Ministry. During the 30 years he spent in state parliament his electorates always included Cobar. He died in office in the Sydney suburb of Little Bay, New South Wales.

== Notes ==
New South Wales Legislative Assembly
Preceded by Charles Fern	Member for Cobar; 1918–1920	Abolished
Preceded by Percival Brookfield	Member for Sturt; 1920–1927; Served alongside: Doe, Brookfield/Wright/Horsington	Succeeded by Ted Horsington
Preceded by Richard Ball; Vern Goodin; Matthew Kilpatrick	Member for Murray; 1927–1930	Succeeded by John Donovan
New division	Member for Cobar; 1930–1949	Succeeded by Ernest Wetherell
Political offices
Preceded by Ernest Buttenshaw	Secretary for Public Works; 1930–1932	Succeeded by Reginald Weaver
