= Electoral district of Wilcannia =

Former state electoral district of New South Wales, Australia

Wilcannia was an electoral district of the Legislative Assembly in the Australian state of New South Wales from 1889 to 1904. The district was named after and included the town of Wilcannia. Prior to 1889 Wilcannia was part of the district of Wentworth. The population in Wentworth had grown significantly since the 1880 redistribution, especially as a result of the growth of mining at Broken Hill. Under the formula for seats, Wentworth was due to return 3 members. Because of the large area covered by the district, in 1889 it was split into 3, Wentworth, Sturt and Wilcannia. Its first member was the son of Charles Dickens. It was abolished in 1904 due to the re-distribution of electorates following the 1903 New South Wales referendum, which required the number of members of the Legislative Assembly to be reduced from 125 to 90. The district was divided between Cobar and the new district of The Darling. The member for Wilcannia was Richard Sleath (Independent Labour) who unsuccessfully contested the 1904 election for The Darling.

== Members for Wilcannia ==
Member	Party	Period
Edward Dickens	Protectionist	1889–1894
Richard Sleath	Labour	1894–1901
Richard Sleath	Independent Labour	1901–1904

== Election results ==
1901 New South Wales state election: Wilcannia
Party	Candidate	Votes	%	±%
Independent Labor	Richard Sleath	637	47.9	−24.1
Labour	John Buzacott	414	31.1	
Independent Liberal	Thomas Bell	280	21.0	
Total formal votes		1,331	99.3	−0.3
Informal votes		10	0.8	+0.3
Turnout		1,341	52.5	+9.9
Member changed to Independent Labour from Labour				
