= Brian Doe =

Australian politician

Brian James Doe (26 January 1862 – 16 April 1941) was an Australian politician.

Doe was born in Portland, Victoria, and educated at Warrnambool and moved to Mount Gambier, South Australia when he was eleven. He worked as a blacksmith and a railway porter at Port Broughton from 1888 until 1899. He married Hannah Fairbank in about 1887 and they had four daughters and two sons. He moved to Broken Hill, New South Wales in about 1906 and worked as an estate agent.

Doe was councillor on Broken Hill council from 1906 until 1911. He was a member of the Australian Labour Party, but was expelled in 1916 for supporting conscription. In 1917, he was elected as a Nationalist to the seat of Murray in the New South Wales Legislative Assembly. With the absorption of Murray into the multi-member electorate of Sturt in 1920, he became one of its members and held his seat until 1927. He simultaneously served as mayor of Ermington-Rydalmere in Sydney from 1917 to 1919. Doe died in the Sydney suburb of Epping.

== Notes ==
Civic offices
Preceded by Samuel Dean Jack	Mayor of Ermington and Rydalmere; 1917 – 1920	Succeeded by George Hughes
New South Wales Legislative Assembly
Preceded by Robert Scobie	Member for Murray; 1917 – 1920	Succeeded by George Beeby; William O'Brien; Richard Ball
Preceded by Percy Brookfield	Member for Sturt; 1920 – 1927; Served alongside: Davidson, Brookfield/Wright/Horsington	Succeeded by Ted Horsington
