= Richard Sleath =

Australian politician

Richard 'Dick' Sleath

Member of the New South Wales Parliament for Wilcannia
- In office 17 July 1894 – 16 July 1904
- Preceded by: Edward Dickens
- Succeeded by: Seat Abolished

Personal details
- Born: Richard Sleath; 3 October 1863 Cerres, Fifeshire, Scotland
- Died: 10 October 1922 (aged 59) Sydney, New South Wales, Australia
- Party: Labor Party
- Other political affiliations: Nationalist Party of Australia
- Occupation: Miner, bushworker, quarryman

Richard Sleath (3 October 1863 – 10 October 1922) was an Australian politician.

Born in Ceres, Fife to ploughman Richard Sleath and Mary Fernie, he migrated to Queensland in 1877, becoming a shearer and prospector. In 1882 he moved to Sydney, working as a contractor before mining at Broken Hill from 1887. On 11 March 1887, he married Jane Dawson with whom he had four sons. He helped found the first Socialist League at Broken Hill and was a member of the central executive of the Labor Party in 1898. In 1894 he was elected to the New South Wales Legislative Assembly as the Labor member for Wilcannia. He lost his Labour endorsement in 1901 but was re-elected as an Independent Labor candidate, losing his seat in 1904. In 1917 Sleath, a supporter of conscription, joined the Nationalist Party. He died in Sydney in 1922.

New South Wales Legislative Assembly
Preceded by Edward Dickens	Member for Wilcannia; 1894 – 1904	District Abolished
