= Electoral district of Cobar =

State electoral district of New South Wales, Australia

Cobar was an electoral district of the Legislative Assembly in the Australian state of New South Wales which was named after the town of Cobar. It was first created in 1894 and abolished in 1920. Cobar was recreated in 1930 and abolished in 1968.

== History ==
Prior to 1894 the town of Cobar was part of the district of Bourke which returned three members. Multi-member constituencies were abolished in the 1893 redistribution, resulting in the creation of 76 new districts, including Cobar. Bourke was reduced in size and parts were given to the new districts of Cobar and The Barwon. Cobar also absorbed parts of the abolished districts of The Bogan and Forbes. The electoral district included all of the counties of Canbelego, Robinson and Yanda as well as parts of the surrounding counties of Booroondarra, Cowper, Flinders, Gregory, Oxley, Rankin, Werunda and Woore. Cobar's economy was centered around copper mining, and the district also included Nyngan which was established in 1883 as a stop on the Main Western railway line on its way to Bourke.

At its establishment in 1894 Cobar had 1,646 enrolled voters, slightly less than the average of 2,046. In 1904 the number of enrolled voters nearly doubled as women were given the right to vote while the number of members of the Legislative Assembly was reduced from 125 to 90 as a result of the 1903 New South Wales referendum. Cobar absorbed parts of The Lachlan and parts of the abolished seats of The Barwon, Condoublin and Wilcannia. The combined effect of the changes meant that the number of enrolled voters in Cobar went from 3,501, to 6,488, an increase of 185%. The district was significantly expanded in 1913, absorbing most of The Darling, including the town of Bourke.

Cobar was abolished in 1920, with the introduction of proportional representation, and was absorbed by the expanded district of Sturt, along with Willyama to create a three-member electorate covering most of the Western Division of New South Wales. Proportional representation was abolished in 1927, with Bourke going to the re-created district of Namoi, while Cobar and Nyngan were in the re-created district of Lachlan.

Cobar was re-created in 1930, and comprised part of the districts of Sturt, Lachlan and Namoi, including the towns of Cobar, Bourke, Brewarrina, Byrock, Wilcannia, White Cliffs and part of Broken Hill.

The 1949 redistribution saw Cobar absorb the entire district of Sturt, but lost Bourke and Nyngan to Castlereagh and South Broken Hill and Menindee to the re-constituted Sturt.

Cobar, along with Sturt were abolished as a result of the 1966 redistribution, replaced by the new district of Broken Hill, which included all of the town, and the district extended from the border with Victoria on the Murray River to the Queensland border in the north, including the towns of Wentworth and Wilcannia. The town of Cobar was absorbed by Castlereagh, which moved west, while south western part of the district was absorbed by the district of Temora.

== Members for Cobar ==
First incarnation (1894–1920)
Member	Party	Term
Thomas Waddell	Protectionist	1894–1898
William Spence	Labour	1898–1901
Donald Macdonell	Labour	1901–1911
Charles Fern	Labour	1911–1918
Mat Davidson	Labor	1918–1920
Second incarnation (1930–1968)
Member	Party	Term
Mat Davidson	Labor	1930–1939
Mat Davidson	Industrial Labor	1939–1939
Mat Davidson	Labor	1939–1949
Ernest Wetherell	Labor	1949–1965
Lew Johnstone	Labor	1965–1968

== Election results ==
1965 New South Wales state election: Cobar
Party	Candidate	Votes	%	±%
Labor	Lew Johnstone	6,200	45.0	−55.0
Liberal	Allan Connell	5,174	37.5	+37.5
Independent	Douglas McFarlane	1,416	10.3	+10.3
Independent	William Edwards	997	7.2	+7.2
Total formal votes		13,787	97.8	
Informal votes		315	2.2	
Turnout		14,102	89.6	
Two-party-preferred result
Labor	Lew Johnstone	7,636	55.4	−44.6
Liberal	Allan Connell	6,151	44.6	+44.6
Labor hold		Swing	N/A	
