= Electoral results for the district of Queanbeyan =

Election results for Queanbeyan, New South Wales, Australia

Queanbeyan, an electoral district of the Legislative Assembly in the Australian state of New South Wales was created in 1859 and abolished in 1913.

Election	Member	Party
1859	William Forster	None
1860	William Redman	None
1864	Leopold De Salis	None
1869	William Forster	None
1872	Leopold William De Salis	None
1874	John Wright	None
1877	James Thompson	None
1880	James Thompson	None
1881 by	Thomas Rutledge	None
1882	George De Salis	None
1885	Edward O'Sullivan	None
1887	Edward O'Sullivan	Protectionist
1889	Edward O'Sullivan	Protectionist
1891	Edward O'Sullivan	Protectionist
1894	Edward O'Sullivan	Protectionist
1895	Edward O'Sullivan	Protectionist
1898	Edward O'Sullivan	National Federal
1901	Edward O'Sullivan	Progressive
1904	Alan Millard	Liberal Reform
1906 by	Granville Ryrie	Liberal Reform
1907	Granville Ryrie	Liberal Reform
1910 by	John Cusack	Labour
1910	John Cusack	Labour

== Election results ==
=== Elections in the 1910s ===
==== 1910 ====
1910 New South Wales state election: Queanbeyan
Party	Candidate	Votes	%	±%
Labour	John Cusack	2,522	51.0	+6.9
Liberal Reform	Joseph Roberts	2,424	49.0	−6.7
Total formal votes		4,946	97.6	+0.2
Informal votes		120	2.4	−0.2
Turnout		5,066	75.3	−3.6
Labour gain from Liberal Reform				

- Granville Ryrie had won Queanbeyan at the 1907 election; however, he resigned to contest the seat of Werriwa at the 1910 federal election. The by-election in April 1910 was won by John Cusack (Labour) who retained the seat at the 1910 general election.

==== 1910 by-election ====
1910 Queanbeyan by-election Wednesday 13 April
Party	Candidate	Votes	%	±%
Labour	John Cusack	2,090	51.9	+7.7
Liberal Reform	Herbert Beegling	1,939	48.1	−7.5
Total formal votes		4,029	98.5	+1.6
Informal votes		63	1.5	−1.6
Turnout		4,092	64.9 (Note: estimate based on an electoral roll of 6,302 at the 1907 election.)	−2.0
Labour gain from Liberal Reform		Swing	+7.7	

Granville Ryrie (Liberal Reform) resigned to unsuccessfully contest the 1910 federal election for Werriwa.

=== Elections in the 1900s ===
==== 1907 ====
1907 New South Wales state election: Queanbeyan
Party	Candidate	Votes	%	±%
Liberal Reform	Granville Ryrie	2,447	55.7	
Labour	George Clark	1,941	44.1	
Independent	Edward Lockwood	9	0.2	
Total formal votes		4,397	97.4	
Informal votes		119	2.6	
Turnout		4,516	71.7	
Liberal Reform hold				

==== 1906 by-election ====
1906 Queanbeyan by-election Saturday 7 April
Party	Candidate	Votes	%	±%
Liberal Reform	Granville Ryrie	2,028	51.0	
Labour	Henry Hungerford	1,948	49.0	
Total formal votes		3,976	99.2	
Informal votes		31	0.8	
Turnout		4,007	61.3 (Note: estimate based on an electoral roll of 6,537 at the 1904 election.)	
Liberal Reform hold				

Alan Millard (Liberal Reform) was expelled because he was convicted of a felony.

==== 1904 ====
1904 New South Wales state election: Queanbeyan
Party	Candidate	Votes	%	±%
Liberal Reform	Alan Millard	2,328	52.0	
Progressive	Patrick Blackall	2,150	48.0	
Total formal votes		4,478	99.4	
Informal votes		29	0.6	
Turnout		4,507	69.0	
Liberal Reform gain from Progressive				

Queanbeyan lost part of the district to Monaro and was expanded to include parts of Yass and the abolished seat of Braidwood. The member for Queanbeyan was Edward O'Sullivan (Progressive) who successfully contested Belmore while the member for Yass was William Affleck (Liberal Reform) who unsuccessfully contested that seat. The member for Braidwood was Albert Chapman (Progressive) who did not contest the election.

==== 1901 ====
1901 New South Wales state election: Queanbeyan
Party	Candidate	Votes	%	±%
Progressive	Edward O'Sullivan	866	69.0	+15.0
Liberal Reform	Charles Turner	376	29.9	−13.8
Independent Liberal	Patrick McNamara	14	1.1	
Total formal votes		1,256	98.4	−0.6
Informal votes		21	1.6	+0.6
Turnout		1,277	65.1	−4.8
Progressive hold				

=== Elections in the 1890s ===
==== 1898 ====
1898 New South Wales colonial election: Queanbeyan
Party	Candidate	Votes	%	±%
National Federal	Edward O'Sullivan	694	54.0	
Free Trade	Alfred Allen	562	43.7	
Independent	Percy Hodgkinson	20	1.6	
Independent	John Harper	10	0.8	
Total formal votes		1,286	98.9	
Informal votes		14	1.1	
Turnout		1,300	69.9	
National Federal hold				

==== 1895 ====
1895 New South Wales colonial election: Queanbeyan
Party	Candidate	Votes	%	±%
Protectionist	Edward O'Sullivan	701	59.3	
Free Trade	Walter Palmer	481	40.7	
Total formal votes		1,182	98.9	
Informal votes		13	1.1	
Turnout		1,195	67.7	
Protectionist hold				

==== 1894 ====
1894 New South Wales colonial election: Queanbeyan
Party	Candidate	Votes	%	±%
Protectionist	Edward O'Sullivan	718	50.7	
Free Trade	Alfred Conroy	443	31.3	
Independent Labour	James McInerney	254	18.0	
Total formal votes		1,415	99.1	
Informal votes		13	0.9	
Turnout		1,428	79.7	
Protectionist hold				

==== 1891 ====
1891 New South Wales colonial election: Queanbeyan Wednesday 24 June
Party	Candidate	Votes	%	±%
Protectionist	Edward O'Sullivan (re-elected)	654	61.6	
Free Trade	Alfred Conroy	407	38.4	
Total formal votes		1,061	98.2	
Informal votes		20	1.9	
Turnout		1,081	66.1	
Protectionist hold				

=== Elections in the 1880s ===
==== 1889 ====
1889 New South Wales colonial election: Queanbeyan Saturday 2 February
Party	Candidate	Votes	%	±%
Protectionist	Edward O'Sullivan (elected)	698	65.3	
Free Trade	Andrew Cunningham	371	34.7	
Total formal votes		1,069	98.4	
Informal votes		17	1.6	
Turnout		1,086	63.6	
Protectionist hold				

==== 1887 ====
1887 New South Wales colonial election: Queanbeyan Saturday 19 February
Party	Candidate	Votes	%	±%
Protectionist	Edward O'Sullivan (re-elected)	707	56.8	
Free Trade	George Tompsitt	537	43.2	
Total formal votes		1,244	98.4	
Informal votes		20	1.6	
Turnout		1,264	48.5	

==== 1885 ====
1885 New South Wales colonial election: Queanbeyan Friday 23 October
Candidate	Votes	%
Edward O'Sullivan (elected)	304	32.5
Percy Hodgkinson	209	22.3
William Affleck	193	20.6
John Wright	164	17.5
William O'Neill	66	7.1
Total formal votes	936	98.0
Informal votes	19	2.0
Turnout	955	49.3

==== 1882 ====
1882 New South Wales colonial election: Queanbeyan Monday 4 December
Candidate	Votes	%
George De Salis (elected)	353	43.6
Percy Hodgkinson	244	30.2
John Wright	212	26.2
Total formal votes	809	98.3
Informal votes	14	1.7
Turnout	823	49.0

==== 1881 by-election ====
1881 Queanbeyan by-election Thursday 27 January
Candidate	Votes	%
Thomas Rutledge (elected)	502	50.7
Percy Hodgkinson	413	41.7
John Gale	76	7.7
Total formal votes	991	97.3
Informal votes	27	2.7
Turnout	1,018	59.5

James Thompson resigned.

==== 1880 ====
1880 New South Wales colonial election: Queanbeyan Monday 22 November
Candidate	Votes	%
James Thompson (re-elected)	518	57.6
Percy Hodgkinson	381	42.4
Total formal votes	899	100.0
Informal votes	0	0.0
Turnout	929	54.3

=== Elections in the 1870s ===
==== 1877 ====
1877 New South Wales colonial election: Queanbeyan Monday 29 October
Candidate	Votes	%
James Thompson (elected)	446	49.8
Thomas Rutledge	337	37.7
William O'Neill	112	12.5
Total formal votes	895	98.4
Informal votes	15	1.7
Turnout	910	67.4

==== 1874 ====
1874–75 New South Wales colonial election: Queanbeyan Wednesday 23 December 1874
Candidate	Votes	%
John Wright (elected)	455	53.3
William Forster	354	41.5
William O'Neill	44	5.2
Total formal votes	853	98.2
Informal votes	16	1.8
Turnout	869	69.6

==== 1872 ====
1872 New South Wales colonial election: Queanbeyan Wednesday 6 March
Candidate	Votes	%
Leopold William De Salis (elected)	305	37.6
Charles Walsh	289	35.6
William O'Neill	217	26.8
Total formal votes	811	100.0
Informal votes	0	0.0
Turnout	811	71.1

=== Elections in the 1860s ===
==== 1869 ====
1869–70 New South Wales colonial election: Queanbeyan Thursday 23 December 1869
Candidate	Votes	%
William Forster (elected)	334	50.7
Charles Campbell	325	49.3
Total formal votes	659	98.5
Informal votes	10	1.5
Turnout	669	63.5

==== 1864 ====
1864–65 New South Wales colonial election: Queanbeyan Saturday 17 December 1864
Candidate	Votes	%
Leopold De Salis (elected)	297	52.3
Charles Campbell	173	30.5
Abraham Levy	98	17.3
Total formal votes	568	100.0
Informal votes	0	0.0
Turnout	571	54.7

==== 1860 ====
1860 New South Wales colonial election: Queanbeyan Wednesday 12 December
Candidate	Votes	%
William Redman (elected)	282	61.8
William Forster (defeated)	174	38.2
Total formal votes	456	100.0
Informal votes	0	0.0
Turnout	456	57.7

=== Elections in the 1850s ===
==== 1859 ====
1859 New South Wales colonial election: Queanbeyan Tuesday 21 June
Candidate	Votes	%
William Forster (re-elected)	unopposed	
