= 1910 Queanbeyan state by-election =

Election result for Queanbeyan, New South Wales, Australia

A by-election was held for the New South Wales Legislative Assembly electorate of Queanbeyan on 13 April 1910. The by-election was triggered by the resignation of Granville Ryrie (Liberal Reform) to unsuccessfully contest the 1910 federal election for Werriwa.

The by-election and those for Darling Harbour and Upper Hunter were held on the same day as the 1910 Federal election.

== Dates ==
Date	Event
26 February 1910	Resignation of Granville Ryrie.
8 March 1910	Writ of election issued by the Speaker of the Legislative Assembly.
23 March 1910	Nominations
13 April 1910	Polling day and 1910 Federal election
3 May 1910	Return of writ

== Results ==
1910 Queanbeyan by-election Wednesday 13 April
Party	Candidate	Votes	%	±%
Labour	John Cusack	2,090	51.9	+7.7
Liberal Reform	Herbert Beegling	1,939	48.1	−7.5
Total formal votes		4,029	98.5	+1.6
Informal votes		63	1.5	−1.6
Turnout		4,092	64.9 (Note: estimate based on an electoral roll of 6,302 at the 1907 election.)	−2.0
Labour gain from Liberal Reform		Swing	+7.7	

== See also ==
- Electoral results for the district of Queanbeyan
- List of New South Wales state by-elections
