= Leopold De Salis =

Leopold De Salis may refer to:

- Leopold Fane De Salis (1816–1898), New South Wales politician
- Leopold William Jerome Fane De Salis (1845–1930), his son, New South Wales politician
