= The Five of Hearts =

The Five of Hearts, or Buffalo Bill's Love Story
- Coolgardie Miner 7 June 1911
- Directed by: E.I. Cole
- Starring: Bohemian Dramatic Company
- Production company: Australian Life Biograph Company
- Distributed by: Pathe Freres
- Release date: 22 April 1911
- Running time: over 2,000 feet, 2200 feet or 1,500 feet
- Country: Australia
- Languages: Silent film English intertitles

The Five of Hearts, or Buffalo Bill's Love Story is a 1911 Australian film from Edward Irham Cole based on a stage play about Buffalo Bill which Cole had performed extensively. It is also known as A Maiden's Distress or Buffalo Bill. It was reportedly the longest of Cole's films.

It is considered a lost film.

== Plot ==
In the old American west, Rose, the daughter of Colonel Daniels, is kidnapped by a desperado named Black Bill at the instigation of Captain Clarke, a rejected lover. She is taken to an Indian camp where she is subjected to torture by being tied to a tree, and daggers thrown all round her until she is completely surrounded by them. She is rescued by Buffalo Bill, her lover. Black Bill and Captain Clarke are killed.

According to contemporary reports, the scenes of the film were:

- Captain Clarke's Treachery;
- Chloroformed;
- On the Trail;
- Jim Blake's Shanty;
- In the Indian Camp;
- Rose Tortured;
- Surrounded by Daggers;
- Rescued;
- Buffalo Bill at the Stake;
- The Indian Chiefs Fight with Knives;
- Black Bill's Lair;
- The Traitors Punished.

Another report said that "'the scene is laid on the outskirts of the Indian Reservation, a country made famous by the exploits of the renowned Buffalo Bill, and the story of the play treats of the adventures of the colonel in charge of the military post and a notorious cattle stealer whom he eventually makes captive."

== Cast ==
- E.I. Cole as Buffalo Bill
- Frank Mills
- Bella Cole
- Vene Linden as Rose Daniels

== Original play ==
Buffalo Bill, or the Five of Hearts
- Original language: English
- Written by: Edward Irham Cole

Premiere
- Date: 2 January 1904
- Directed by: Edward Irham Cole

The film is an adaptation of an open-air stage show regularly produced by Cole and his Bohemian Dramatic Company, Buffalo Bill, or the Five of Hearts, about an Indian woman who refuses to marry a cowboy. The Indian has daggers thrown at her in a test of courage. The cowboy tries to kill the woman but Chief Wild Friday intervenes and frees her.

According to one report "Buffalo Bill is 'a part which Mr. Cole has created, and made "his own", his personality entirely fitting him for it. He is helped by a striking resemblance to Colonel Cody."

The play was reportedly written by Cole himself who also staged it.

The play was revived a number of times. Cole was still appearing in the play as late as 1919.

In 1908 the Bohemian company presented a new play The White Beaver, or Buffalo Bill's Pard.

== Production ==
The film version of the play was shot near Melbourne.

== Release ==
The film sometimes screened on a double bill with another movie of Cole's, Sentenced for Life, and was accompanied by songs and lectures.

According to one review, "the play is well staged, and the acting is of a high order, and, on the whole, the film augurs well for the success of the industry in the Commonwealth."

Another, in the Barrier Miner, said the film "forms a thrilling subject."

The Kalgoorlie Miner said it was "an extremely lengthy film containing in 'itself all the salient points for the preparation of a Western American romance. Nothing is omitted that savors of sensationalism. The spectators may see the abduction of the spirited daughter of a military colonel through the treachery of an attachment of the fort, a-nd they may admire the dexterous ingenuity of the red men in tying her to a. board, where they imbed knives and tomahawks by the score, thus forming an unpleasant frame for an otherwise pretty picture."

Only four and a half minutes of the film survive today.
