= Sentenced for Life =

Sentenced for Life may refer to:

- Sentenced for Life (1911 film), an Australian film
- Sentenced for Life (1960 film), a low budget British crime film
