= Hands Up =

Hands Up may refer to:

== Film and TV ==
- Hands Up (serial), a 1918 film serial, directed by Louis J. Gasnier and James W. Horne
- Hands Up! (1917 film), directed by Tod Browning
- Hands Up (1921 film), a German silent film
- Hands Up! (1926 film), directed by Clarence G. Badger
- Hands Up! (1981 film) or Rece do góry, a Polish film
- Hands Up (2000 film), a Telugu film
- Hands Up! (2003 film), a Chinese film

== Music ==
- Hands up (music genre), a genre of trance music
- Ruki Vverh!, or Hands Up, a Russian pop music group
- Hands Up (album), a 2011 album by 2PM

=== Songs ===
- "Hands Up" (2PM song), 2011
- "Hands Up" (Cherry Bullet song), 2020
- "Hands Up" (Hype song), 1995
- "Hands Up" (Kis-My-Ft2 song), 2019
- "Hands Up" (Lloyd Banks song), 2006
- "Hands Up" (Meovv song), 2025
- "Hands Up" (Merk & Kremont song), 2018
- "Hands Up" (NCT Wish song), 2023
- "Hands Up" (TLC song), 2003
- "Hands Up!" (6arelyhuman song), 2023
- "Hands Up (4 Lovers)", 1993 song by Right Said Fred from their album Sex and Travel
- "Hands Up (Give Me Your Heart)", by the disco duo Ottawan, 1981
- "Hands Up", by Army of Lovers from Le Grand Docu-Soap, 2001
- "Hands Up", by BigBang from Tonight, 2011
- "Hands Up", by the Black Eyed Peas from Elephunk, 2003
- ”Hands Up”, a song by NF from his self titled extended play NF
- "Hands Up", a song by Fitz and the Tantrums from All the Feels, 2019
- "Hands Up", by Groove Armada from Soundboy Rock, 2007
- "Hands Up", by September from Love CPR, 2011
- "Hands Up", by Romanian singer Inna from Nirvana, 2017
- "Hands Up (My Last)", by Lil Wayne from Sorry 4 the Wait, 2011
- "Hands Up (Wink Wink)", 2016 song by Reks from his album The Greatest X

== Other ==
- Hands up, don't shoot, or simply "hands up", a slogan and gesture inspired by the shooting of Michael Brown
- Hands Up (Leitch play), an 1893 Australian play by George Leitch
- Hands Up (Cole play), a 1900 Australian play by Edward Irham Cole

== See also ==
- Hands up punishment, a form of punishment in schools in India
- List of gestures § Two handed
