= 1881 Queanbeyan colonial by-election =

By-election in New South Wales, Australia

A by-election was held for the New South Wales Legislative Assembly electorate of Queanbeyan on 27 January 1881. The election was triggered by the resignation of James Thompson, taking up the government position of Railway Land Valuator.

== Dates ==
Date	Event
11 January 1881	James Thompson appointed to Legislative Council and Postmaster-General.
12 January 1881	Writ of election issued by the Speaker of the Legislative Assembly.
24 January 1881	Nominations
27 January 1881	Polling day
8 February 1881	Return of writ

== Candidates ==
- John Gale was the publisher of a local paper, The Queanbeyan Age.
- Percy Hodgkinson was a surveyor, land agent and auctioneer in Queanbeyan, who was an unsuccessful candidate at the 1880 election.
- Thomas Rutledge was a pastoralist who was an unsuccessful candidate at the 1877 election.

== Result ==
1881 Queanbeyan by-election Thursday 27 January
Candidate	Votes	%
Thomas Rutledge (elected)	502	50.7
Percy Hodgkinson	413	41.7
John Gale	76	7.7
Total formal votes	991	97.3
Informal votes	27	2.7
Turnout	1,018	59.5

== See also ==
- Electoral results for the district of Queanbeyan
- List of New South Wales state by-elections
