= Whirlwind, the Bushranger =

1907 Australian play by Edward Irham Cole

- Original language: English
- Written by: Edward Irham Cole
- Subject: melodrama

Premiere
- Date: July 5, 1907
- Place: Haymarket Hippodrome, Sydney
- Directed by: Edward Irham Cole

Whirlwind, the Bushranger, or the Roaring Forties is a 1907 Australian play by Edward Irham Cole about the fictitious bushranger.

The play was part of the Australian "bushranging play" boom of the 1900s. Cole wrote several works about bushrangers such as Ned Kelly and Ben Hall. This was about a fictional bushranger and his brother. The play appears to have been less popular than Cole's work based on real bushrangers although it was performed by Cole's company over a number of years.

The Sydney Morning Herald said "The drama abounds in realism, sensationalism, pathos, and humour, and is well mounted."

The play's debut production followed that of another Cole work The Missing Partner.
