= For King and Empire =

1906 Australian play by Edward Irham Cole

- Original language: English
- Written by: Edward Irham Cole

Premiere
- Date: April 28, 1906
- Place: Haymarket Hippodrome, Sydney
- Directed by: Edward Irham Cole

For King and Empire is a 1906 Australian play by Edward Irham Cole although several scenes and incidents were suggested by Edward William O'Sullivan.

The play was performed by Cole's Bohemian Dramatic Company.

It was a "military drama" set in the future "which deals with a European war, in which England and America, with the assistance of Australia are engaged against Russia and Germany."

The Evening News said "The piece is well staged, and well played, and had a very good reception." It appears the play drew strong crowds.

The play is not to be confused with For King and Empire a Boer War drama performed by Bohemian Dramatic Company.

The play was successfully revived in 1914.

== Premise ==
"The play opens at the home of Captain Raymond, a retired seafarer, whose home is brightened by the presence of his adopted daughter, Sylvia Tressilion. War breaks out, and Australia responds to the call; in fact some of her fighters have already returned from the fight. Among the returned heroes is Captain Gerald Berkley, who is in love with Sylvia, but Berkely has a rival in the form of Lieutenant Sydney Bolton, also an enemy in Sidney's cousin, Graham. Sydney Bolton endeavors to secure Sylvia's hand and fortune in order to redeem his own financial position. He forces a quarrel on Berkely, but gets the worst of it. Sylvia is decoyed to Bolton's home, and while there witnesses a murder of which her lover is later accused. Her evidence saves him, but Graham Bolton, knowing that Gerald is again ordered to the front, seeks to prove the charge. Complications, tragedy, and sensation follow, but the supposed murder is finally cleared up, and the play concludes with the prospect of peace and happiness."
