= Hunted to Death =

1907 Australian stage play

Hunted to Death, or Tales of Old Bendigo is a 1907 Australian stage play that was presented by Edward Irham Cole's Bohemian Drama Company. The play made its world debut in Melbourne. The play then toured in Sydney.

The Sydney Morning Herald said "The drama is one dealing with life on the gold, fields in the early days. It is suitably staged and mounted, and received a flattering reception."

When the play was revived in 1910 it was called Hunted to Death or Murder in Golden Gully. An ad said the play was being done for the first time and "This drama is said to be founded upon facts, and also deals with incidents in the career of the notorious Power."
