= The Squatter and the Clown =

- Bendigo Advertiser 17 Feb 1913
- Directed by: E. I. Cole
- Starring: Bohemian Dramatic Company
- Production company: Australian Biograph
- Release date: 17 July 1911
- Country: Australia
- Languages: Silent film English intertitles

The Squatter and the Clown is a 1911 Australian silent film. It was one of a series of films made by Edward Irham Cole's Bohemian Dramatic Company.

It is considered a lost film.

== Plot ==
According to a contemporary report "this is said to be a typical story, of the bush, telling the touching story, of a strolling player's devotion to his wife. The play is produced in 15 scenes."

== Release ==
In New Zealand the film was described as a "New Zealand bush drama".

The Adelaide Advertiser called it a "dramatic film of high merit."

In 1913 a number of Bohemian Pictures filmed screened on the one program.
