= Mulga Fred Wilson =

Australian Aboriginal rodeo performer (1874-1948)

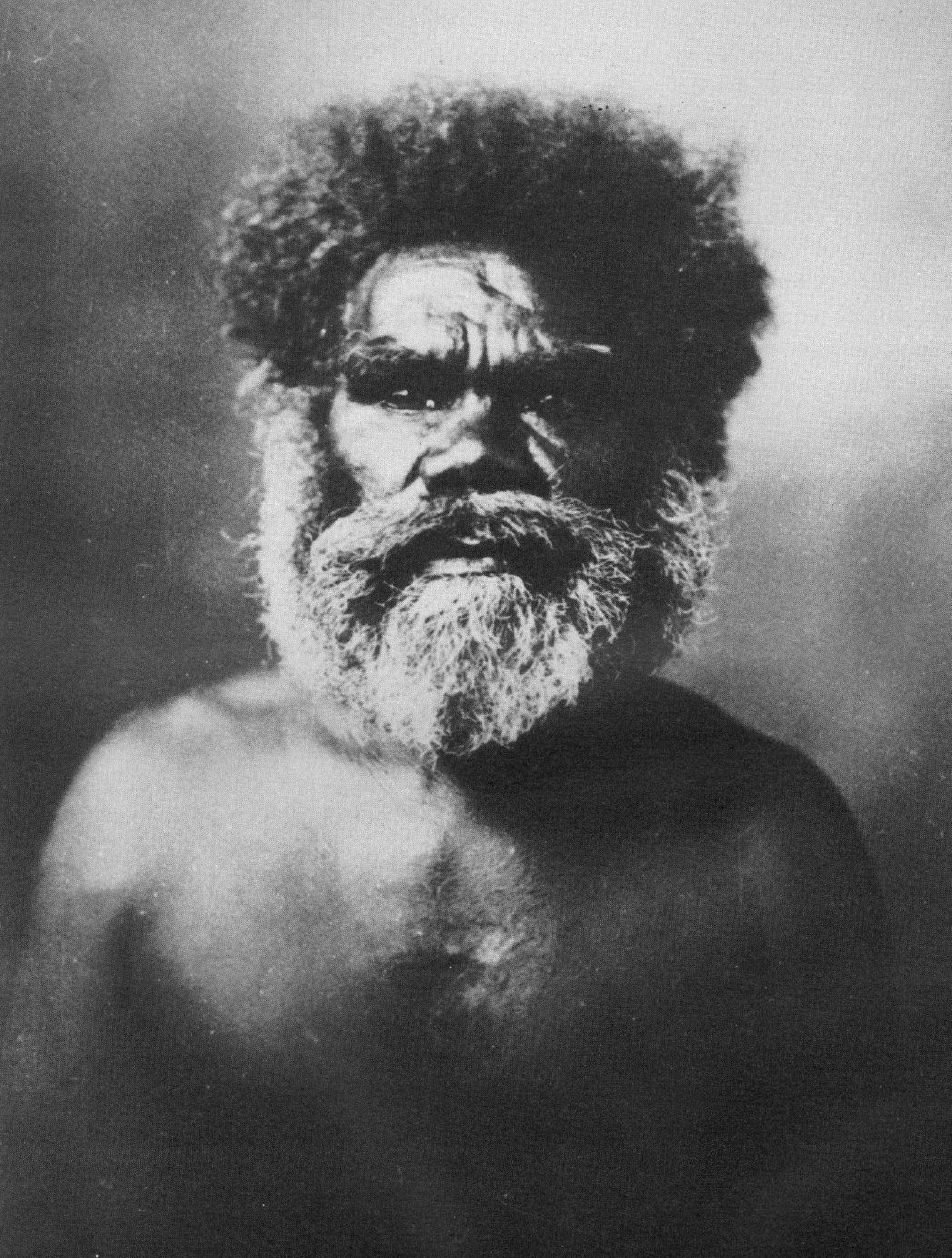
- Portrait of Mulga Fred Wilson in the 1930s (photographed by James McColl).
- Born: c. 1874 (possibly as early as 1868). Pilbara region, Western Australia
- Died: 2 November 1948; Horsham, Victoria, Australia
- Occupations: rodeo rider, stockman, actor

Mulga Fred Wilson (c. 1874 – 2 November 1948) was an Australian Aboriginal stockman and buck-jump rider, known as Mulga Fred. He was the star attraction of various touring rodeo shows in the decade before the First World War. Wilson is considered to be the first Aboriginal actor to appear in a motion picture for his role in the film Bushranger's Ransom, or A Ride for Life, completed in 1911. By the 1920s Wilson was leading an itinerant lifestyle, mainly throughout the western districts of Victoria, with occasional visits to the urban centres of Melbourne and Geelong. He was a well-known character in western Victoria where he attended agricultural shows and football games, demonstrating his skills with the stockwhip and the boomerang, as well as his abilities as a buck-jump rider. He also worked as a horse-breaker and station-hand throughout his life. Mulga Fred died in November 1948 at Horsham railway station, aged about 74 years, from injuries received when he was hit by a train.

There was a wide-spread belief that Wilson had been the original model for images of an Aboriginal man, known as 'Pelaco Bill', featured in advertisements for the Pelaco company, a Melbourne-based shirt manufacturer.

== Biography ==
=== Early years ===
Fred Wilson was born in the Pilbara region of Western Australia, in the district near present-day Port Hedland, on the traditional lands of the indigenous Nyamal, Kariyarra and Ngarla people.

The location of Fred Wilson's birth has been identified as either 'De Grey' station or the adjoining 'Mundabullangana' station.^{[A]} He was born during the period of European encroachment onto the traditional lands of the indigenous people of the Pilbara area. Walter Padbury took up land on the De Grey River in 1863 to form a sheep station, but abandoned his holding in 1868. In 1870 the land was taken up under a leasehold arrangement by the partnership of McKenzie Grant, Edwin Anderson and John Edgar, who established the 'De Grey' station. In 1872 'Mundabullangana' station, on the Yule River, south-west of 'De Grey' station, was taken up by the McKay brothers. The 'De Grey' and 'Mundabullangana' stations were primarily established as sheep stations, with Aboriginal labour used for shepherding, fencing, the operation and maintenance of wells, shearing and wool processing, as well as general stock work. In addition to sheep, some cattle were raised on the properties as fat stock and horses were bred for station work and export. In 1886 it was recorded that 'De Grey' station "employed... over 100 native men besides women and children".

Fred Wilson was the son of Aboriginal parents who worked on the pastoral property where he was born, members of a group of about 300 Aborigines "who looked on the station as their home". His European name was Fred Wilson, but he may have also been known by the surname Clarke. His Aboriginal name has not been recorded. Fred Wilson's year of birth has been estimated as 1874, but it may have been as early as 1968.

Fred's father was a "boss stockman" of the station where he was raised. As a boy Fred Wilson was given the job of bringing in the saddle horses from a 25-hectare paddock. He learned to ride and tame horses.

Wilson joined Jack Noble's party of drovers to move ten thousand cattle from the Pilbara region to the Murchison district.

=== Buck-jump rider ===
Wilson probably left Western Australia aboard a boat transporting cattle from Port Hedland to South Australia. The cattle, originally from 'De Grey' station, were then driven to one of Sidney Kidman's stations in South Australia, where Wilson remained for several years.

In 1906 Wilson was one of a team of drovers that took cattle to Adelaide. In Adelaide Wilson attended a Broncho George Rough Riders show.^{[B]} He accepted Bronco George's challenge to ride 'King', the wildest of the company's horses, for a period of twenty seconds for prize-money of five pounds. He won the prize when he rode 'King' "not for 20 seconds, but to a defeated standstill". Wilson was then hired by Bronco George and toured with the buck-jumping company throughout southern Australia. By 1907 Wilson was known professionally as 'Mulga Fred'. At one of Broncho George's shows at Kadina, on the Yorke Peninsula of South Australia, Mulga Fred's horse-riding skills were praised and it was noted that he "amused the audience muchly during the evening". Fred departed from Broncho George's company in 1908 during their Melbourne season.

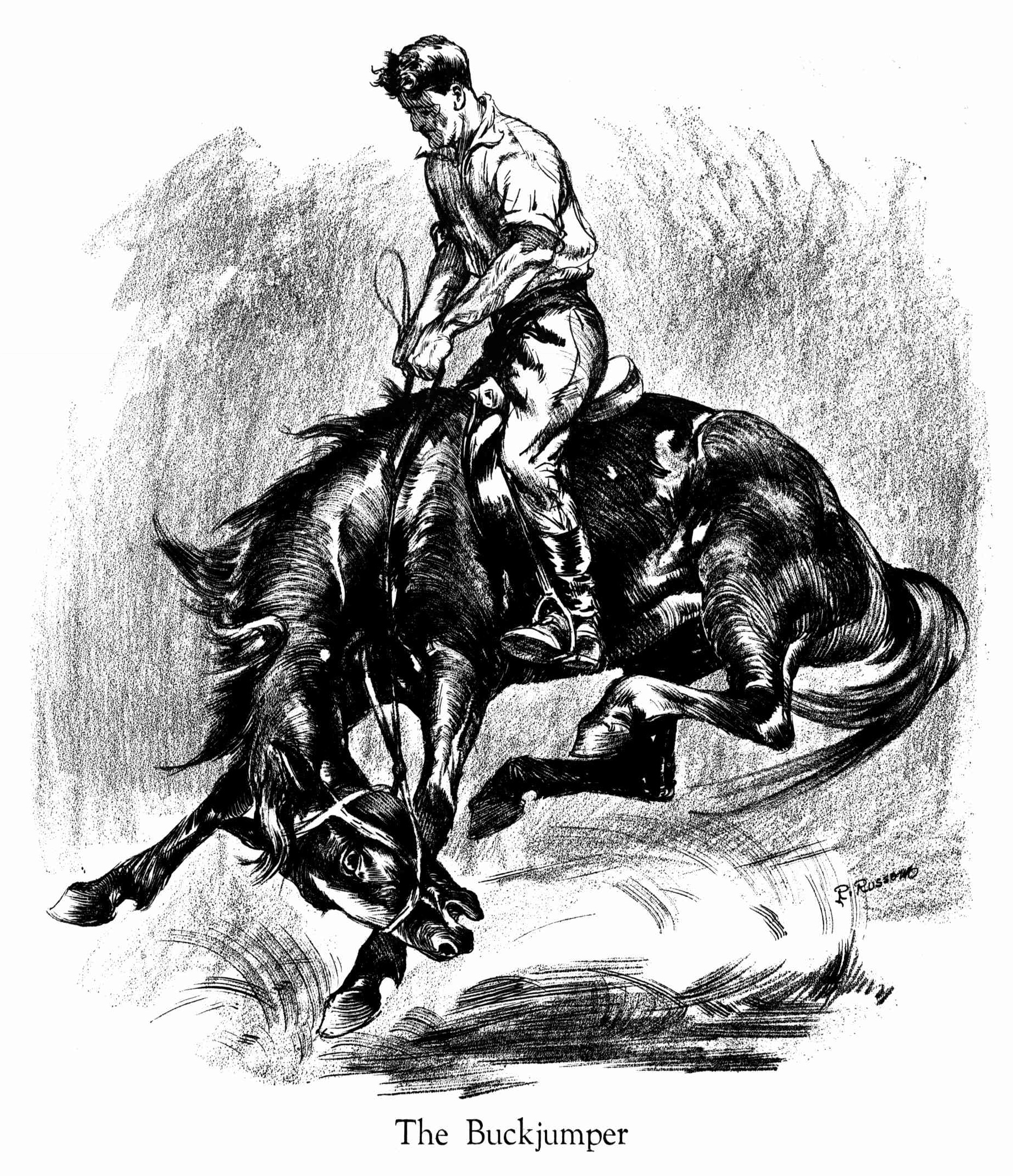
'The Buckjumper', illustration by Reg Russom, published in the Sydney Mail, 8 April 1936.

In April 1909 at the Agricultural Show at Westbury, in the central north of Tasmania, Mulga Fred gave 'an exhibition of steer riding [which] greatly amused the spectators". In July 1909 Mulga Fred, described as "formerly with Broncho George's rough riders", was living at Barrington, near Devonport in northern Tasmania. On July 3 he was arrested at Devonport and charged with being "drunk and incapable". He was described as being "in a bad way... and required medical assistance, having the symptoms of alcoholic poisoning". Fred was brought before the Devonport Police Court on July 5, where he pleaded guilty and was ordered to pay ten shillings for the cost of the medical attendant. Mulga Fred was still living in the Devonport district in November 1909. On November 24 he participated as a rider at a race meeting at Railton, winning a hurdles race.

Mulga Fred Wilson appeared as a cast member in a motion picture called Bushranger's Ransom, or A Ride for Life, produced by Pathé Frères' and released in March 1911. The appearance of Wilson in the silent film was advertised as "the first Australian aboriginal actor to appear in a photo play". Bushranger's Ransom was the first motion picture production by Pathé Frères after establishing a branch office in Sydney in April 1910. Other cast members in the film were actors of the Bohemian Dramatic Company.

In March 1911 Mulga Fred rode in a buck-jumping contest at the Doncaster and Box Hill Horticultural Association Show in Victoria, north-east of Melbourne. He won the contest which had prizemoney of four pounds. At the Alfred Hospital Bazaar in April 1911, Mulga Fred was one of four rough riders who entertained the crowd by engaging in "the thrilling performance of riding unbroken horses and wild bullocks".

During 1911 Mulga Fred was engaged by Billy Kinnear as the star rider of Kinnear's buck-jumping show running in Melbourne. He proved to be a popular attraction. It was stated that he was never thrown, except on one occasion when a spectator bet two pounds that Fred could not better the time of four seconds on 'Paul', "the champion bucking bullock". He bettered the time and collected the two pounds, but had two ribs broken when the bullock threw him into the arena fence.

In June 1911 Wilson participated in the Melbourne Coronation Buckjumping Carnival, part of the celebrations marking the coronation of George V and his wife Mary in London. The carnival was held over fifteen nights, under canvas at the Melbourne Hippodrome. The Coronation Buckjumpers advertised a succession of named 'outlaw' horses, as well as bucking bulls and ponies, with prize-money up to £25. An advertisement for the night of June 29 included: "Kyneton Kate still throws them all, will she get rid of Mulga Fred to-night?". Later references suggest that Wilson may have been the overall winner of the carnival, referring to his "reputation as a remarkable rough rider [who] in Melbourne in 1911 won the Coronation Buck Jump championship".

At a buck-jumping exhibition held in the Market Square at Geelong in January 1913, Wilson was described as "the show's champion". The show was advertised as "wild Australian rough riders versus American". Wilson toured as a rough rider with a company called the Crown Buckjumpers (that had been formed 1911). At their appearance in Bendigo in March 1913, Wilson was commended as "a West Australian aboriginal, who it is claimed will 'ride anything with four legs'" It was also remarked that "he is also skilful with the stockwhip".

=== Stockwhips and boomerangs ===
In June 1915 Wilson was charged with "obstruction of the footpath" and spent a night in gaol after he attracted a crowd in Bourke Street in Melbourne by demonstrating fire-making skills "by twirling one stick on another in the old bush way". He claimed to be raising money for the Lord Mayor's Belgian Fund, in support of Belgium after its invasion by Germany. Wilson was released the following day with "a nominal fine of five shillings".

In February 1916 Wilson was charged with "making use of insulting words in a railway carriage". The incident occurred on a train travelling from Birchip to St. Arnaud", in the Wimmera region of Victoria. A conductor reported to police that during the trip Wilson "was very abusive and made use of filthy language within the hearing of passengers". He appeared before the St. Arnaud Police Court and was fined two pounds plus costs and "warned to be more careful in future". From May 1916 Mulga Fred offered his services as a horsebreaker; in advertisements placed in The Birchip Advertiser he claimed: "Any bad Horses will be ridden, and a guarantee will be given that same will be thoroughly quiet". In August 1916, in announcing details for the "patriotic carnival and soldiers' day" at Traynor's Lagoon near St. Arnaud, it was reported that the "services of Mulga Fred... have been secured, and he will give an exhibition of rough riding, cracking the stock whip, and boomerang throwing". The Aboriginal rider had undertaken "to ride any horse which is brought to him". In September 1916 it was reported that Mulga Fred had attempted to enlist at Wycheproof for army service, "but his papers have been held over for further consideration".

In December 1917 Wilson participated in a patriotic sports day at Prooinga, near Swan Hill on the Murray River, where he exhibited "buck jumping, boomerang throwing and whip cracking". In September 1918 it was reported that Mulga Fred "is gaining quite a notoriety in Ultima" (in the Swan Hill district), after he "was again locked up... on a charge of being drunk and disorderly".

A couple of days after Christmas 1920, Mulga Fred and another "full-blooded aborigine" were arrested in Fitzroy and "were locked up for their own protection". When they appeared in court the next day Wilson greeted the magistrate "with an expansive smile, and wished him a happy New Year". He informed the court that he had been working at Koo-wee-rup (south-east of Melbourne) "and had come to town to spend Christmas". The magistrate advised the men "to return to the country again as speedily as possible" and discharged them without penalty.

In September 1921 during a stopover on King Island (on their way from Melbourne to Launceston), Wilson and a man named Joe Career (described as a Tasmanian half-caste) entertained the residents of Currie. Mulga Fred gave an exhibition of whip-cracking "using a couple of whips, frequently together, with remarkable precision, and at times to the considerable temerity of the inevitable small boy who held pieces of paper for him". Joe Career's special skill was the ability to extricate himself from being tied up with rope. Wilson then demonstrated his rough riding ability at a nearby recreation ground by riding a local horse with "a reputation for nastiness" and a younger unbroken horse. A large crowd gathered for the demonstrations and "the collection taken up was very good". Wilson remained in Tasmania until at least early February 1922, after which he returned to Victoria.

Since his days with Broncho George's Rough Riders, Wilson had a friend and occasional companion named 'Combo George' (alias George Buckley), who was another "full-blooded aboriginal" man. Combo George had been another expert rough rider in Broncho George's troupe. In March 1922 Wilson and Combo George were charged in Melbourne "with offensive behaviour in a public place". The two men were performing a whip-cracking exhibition in Russell Street. Mulga Steve "dexterously whipped the ash from Combo's cigarette" in a performance that "caused disturbance in the neighbourhood, and drew a crowd that threatened to hinder traffic". The two aborigines "were passing the hat around when they were interrupted by the police". Mulga Fred and Combo George spent a week on gaol before their case was dealt with. In the end the Police magistrate discharged the men, "after having warned them to leave intoxicating drink alone".

In 1924 Wilson was referred to as a "manipulator of stock whips and boomerangs". Mulga Fred's whip-cracking demonstrations did not always go to plan. In August 1924 he and a companion were entertaining a crowd near Flinders Street station when Mulga Fred's companion cut the face of a volunteer holding a piece of paper in his mouth. A police constable intervened and "despite Mulga Fred's remonstrances, took possession of the smaller of the two whips". In September 1924 Wilson, "an aboriginal well-known around the city streets", was engaged in a buck-jumping display at Wirth's Park when he was thrown heavily after the breast-strap broke. He was admitted to Melbourne Hospital with fractured ribs.

During 1928 and early 1929 Wilson was one of the featured rodeo riders in Harry Bullock and Sons' All Star Buckjumping Show, which toured in Victoria. Mulga Fred and young Les Bullock also demonstrated "whip cracking and rope spinning" skills. The show claimed to have "the oldest (Mulga Fred) and the youngest (Keith Bullock) buck-jumper riders appearing in the Southern Hemisphere". The Bullock family were from Hamilton in the Western District of Victoria, well-known for their horse-riding skills. In Mulga Fred's obituary it was noted that he had been employed for many years by Harry Bullock as a horse-breaker.

In June 1929 Wilson was employed on 'Mingbool' station near Mount Gambier, in South Australia near the Victorian border, probably as a horse-breaker. Wilson tamed horses throughout western Victoria, moving between pastoral stations where his services were required. He often remained for months on a property. His technique was to "tame horses, not break them", using intuitive methods based on "the right moment to act and how a horse would react". Wilson also worked as a rouseabout and wool presser, as well as other station labouring work such as cutting posts and general fencing, stripping wattle bark and carting hay.

=== Later years ===
In July 1932 at Naracoorte in South Australia (near the border with Victoria), Mulga Fred gave an exhibition of his skills with a stockwhip during the interval of a football match between Naracoorte and Bordertown, "which lent quite a pleasing variety to the afternoon's sport".

At a rodeo at Naracoorte in April 1934 Mulga Fred was "giving a display of buckjump riding on his own initiative", when he was thrown and received a deep wound on his arm when the horse trod on him. His wound was stitched and he spent several days in the local hospital. In June 1934 Wilson was charged at Mount Gambier with "being unlawfully in possession of two bottles of wine". When he appeared before the Police Court it was noted that the "defendant had been fined for drunkenness three days before, and given an opportunity to return to Victoria".

In June 1935 Wilson was brought to Melbourne to participate in centenary celebrations commemorating the signing of the treaty between John Batman and a group of Wurundjeri elders, for the purchase of land around Port Phillip near the site of Melbourne. He claimed that he had been invited to make a speech at a commemoration event on the banks of Merri Creek, but failed to make an appearance after being arrested at Northcote and charged with being drunk and disorderly. In July 1935 Wilson was brought before the Hawthorn Police Court, charged with "having wandered abroad to beg alms". Constable Gooden testified that he had seen the "defendant going from shop to shop in Burwood-road begging for food". When questioned Wilson explained that he had "been brought from the country" to participate in "the Wild Australia Stampede at the Centenary celebrations, but when the enterprise failed he was left stranded". When the magistrate asked Mulga Fred "what he would do if allowed to go", he replied that he would "head straight for the bush". He added: "Give me a chance; I will go to Hamilton". The magistrate adjourned the case and told the defendant: "We will see you are given your fare and some money for the journey".

In February 1936 an article about Mulga Fred Wilson in the Portland Guardian newspaper included the following: "Now past the stage of rough life and breaking horses, Mulga gets a living by boomerang throwing and whip cracking at the various shows and sports meetings around the district, and despite the infirmity of age, he is still a master at the game". In January 1937 Wilson was charged with travelling without a ticket on the Ballarat to Geelong train. When he appeared before the Geelong Police Court Mulga Fred told the magistrate he "believes that as a blackfellow living in a free country he is entitled to travel on the railways without a ticket". Constable Smith told the court that he had known Wilson for sixteen years "and he was a man of good character". Mulga Fred was convicted and discharged.

In May 1936 the Clerk of Courts at Nhill, Percy Biggin, wrote to the Victorian Board for the Protection of Aborigines requesting the old age pension for Mulga Fred. Biggin described Wilson as being "well known and popular throughout Victoria"; he was "a fairly good type, as aborigines go [who] occasionally allows himself to become the worse for drink, but he is never offensive". He added: "After the free, open life he has led, he does not want to go into a mission station". The Board replied that they had no power to assist Mulga Fred as, being born in Western Australia, he did not come under the Aborigines Act 1928. A Coleraine storekeeper, Edmund Trangmar, took up Mulga Fred's case and a pension was eventually granted on the condition that Trangmar administer the payments. By 1947 Wilson was receiving an old age pension of 65 shillings per fortnight, paid directly to Trangmar "who doles it out to him".

By the early 1940s, with Mulga Fred in about his early 70s, despite his age and declining ability he occasionally attempted to enter buckjumping contests. A report of Thorpe McConville's Wild Australia show at Casterton in November 1941 described how McConville was eventually persuaded by Mulga Fred to give him a ride. McConville selected "a good bucker, but otherwise a docile creature". After unseating Wilson, the horse "stood quite still, gazing very peacefully and sorrowfully at him". In later life Mulga Fred walked with a limp, a consequence of his buck-jump riding.

Despite his peripatetic lifestyle Wilson maintained a connection with the residents of the Condah Mission Station near Portland. He had a strong friendship with Mrs. Hannah Lovett, an Aboriginal elder at the mission. When she died in August 1946, Wilson attended the burial service.

=== Death ===
Mulga Fred Wilson died in the early hours of 2 November 1948 when he was struck by a train at Horsham station in the Wimmera district of western Victoria. Mulga Fred had arrived by train from Stawell earlier that evening and was resting in the station waiting room, waiting for a train to Dimboola. He was seen shortly before midnight on the platform. It was believed he fell off the platform and "lay stunned" between the rail and the signal wires. When the express train to Adelaide arrived at Horsham in the early hours of the morning, the wheels of the train amputated Mulga Fred's feet. Several other trains had passed before his body was discovered at eight o'clock by the assistant stationmaster.

On November 23 the Horsham Times reported that "several local enthusiasts have organised a small appeal to place a headstone on the grave of Mulga Fred". It was noted that the Pelaco Company had also promised to assist. The headstone placed on his grave had a simple inscription, "Mulga Fred 2-11-1948 R.I.P.", together with engravings of a stockwhip and boomerang. In 1976, after an attack by vandals, the Horsham and Coleraine Apex clubs remodelled his grave, with a new headstone bearing an identical inscription and symbols.

== 'Pelaco Bill' ==
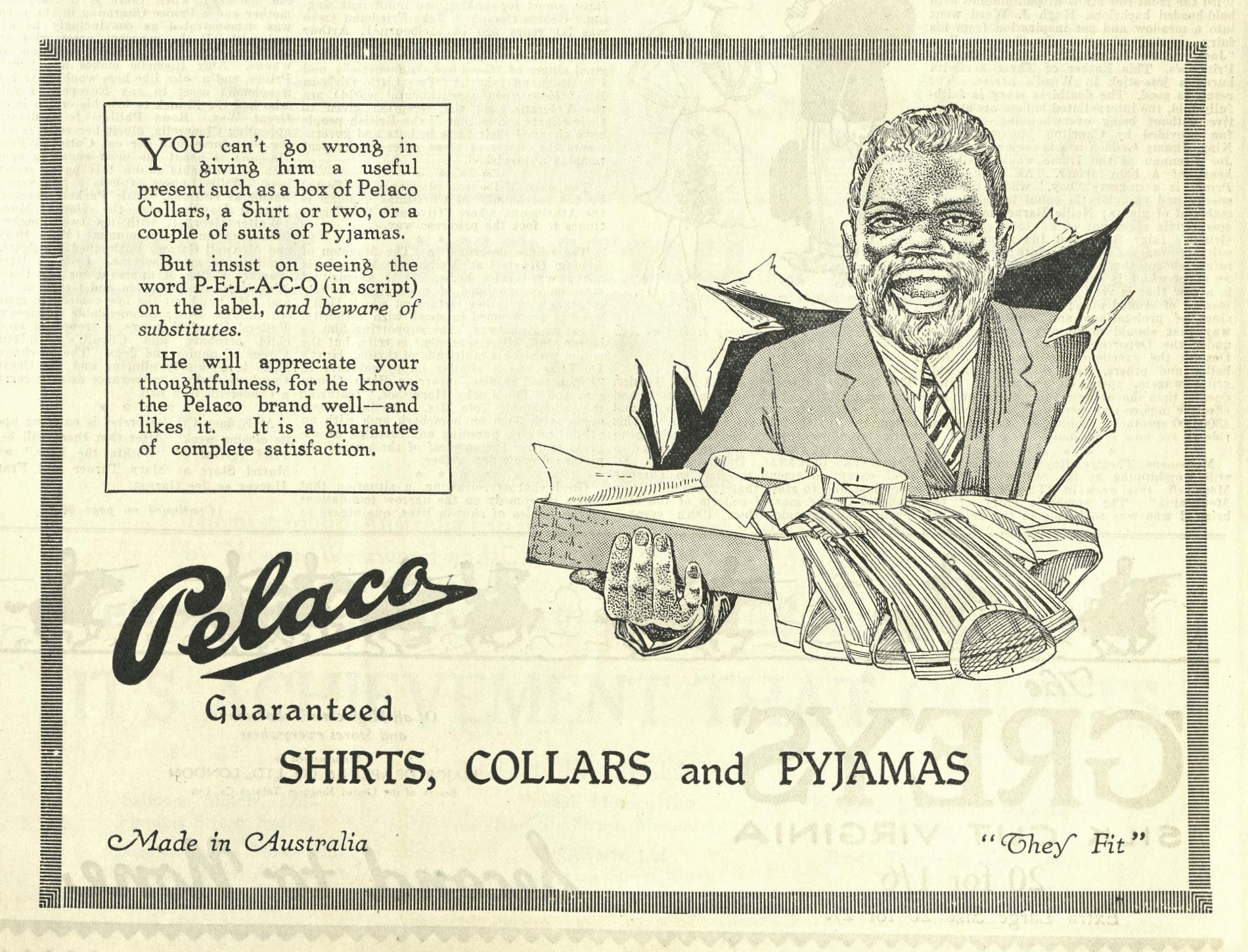
Pelaco advertisement featuring the Aboriginal 'Pelaco Bill' character, published in The Bulletin, 31 December 1925.

When Mulga Fred Wilson died in November 1948 a number of newspapers throughout Australia reported that he had been the original model for well-known advertisements for Pelaco shirts featuring the image of a smiling Aboriginal man known as 'Pelaco Bill'. The shirt manufacturing business had commenced in Melbourne in about 1906 by James Pearson and James Law. In about 1914 the company of Pearson, Law Ltd., shirt and collar manufacturers, adopted the brand-name 'Pelaco' and the company began to use images in its advertising of an Aboriginal man to highlight the fact that it was an Australian company. The original image had been drawn by Tom Mockridge in 1906, of "a robust and proud Aboriginal man striding along wearing nothing but a white shirt". The image became a company icon known as 'Pelaco Bill', often accompanied by the slogan "Mine tinkit they fit", which featured in advertisements in dozens of variations produced until the end of the 1940s.

The contribution by the Pelaco company towards the cost of Wilson's headstone seemed to confirm the association between Mulga Fred and 'Pelaco Bill'. Soon after Mulga Fred's death, however, several reports published in The Bulletin indicated that the head of the Aborigine in Mockridge's drawing had been copied from "a 3d. postcard" purchased from the Royal Arcade in Melbourne.

The complicated question of whether Mulga Fred was the model for Mockridge's original drawing, the prototype for the subsequent 'Pelaco Bill' advertising, has been explored by the historian Richard Broome. He notes that the Pelaco company "has both affirmed and doubted the connection over the years". During Wilson's life Pelaco occasionally provided him with shirts and small amounts of money. As well as contributing to Mulga Fred's headstone after his death, the company donated four hundred dollars in 1976 to the restoration of his gravesite. In 1987 Pelaco sponsored the inaugural Mulga Fred whip-cracking competition at Hamilton during Wool Week.

Broome concludes his investigation of Wilson's connection with Pelaco by stating: "We can perhaps never know whether Fred Wilson was the subject of this advertising campaign". He adds: "Whatever the 'truth', both Wilson and the company gained if Mulga Fred and 'Pelaco Bill' were identified as one, so both appropriated the other". The widely-believed association had mutual benefits for both parties; "Pelaco was content to associate its image with a great rodeo rider and Victorian public character, and Mulga Fred was happy to appropriate 'Pelaco Bill' as himself, gain more fame, the odd shirt and a £5 note".

== Notes ==
A.Richard Broome cites evidence of Mulga Fred Wilson being born on 'De Grey' station, which adjoins 'Mundabullangana' station in the Port Hedland district. The newspaper article identifying 'Mundabullangana' station as his place of birth names the source of the information as Robert H. Edgar of 'Cuyuac' station in the Nareen district of south-west Victoria. Wilson worked for Edgar for eight months in about 1944 and Edgar's brothers, Alec and John Edgar, had previously owned 'De Grey' station.

B.'Bronco George' (George Silvanius Looper) was from Texas and arrived in Australia as a cowboy with Wirth Brothers' Wild West Show in December 1890. For a period during the mid-1890s Bronco George was the headline attraction of Montgomery & Moreny's Wild West Show. By 1902 Bronco George was presenting his own Wild West Show, which by April 1906 had been renamed Bronco George's Rough Riders.
