= 1906 Queanbeyan state by-election =

Election result for Queanbeyan, New South Wales, Australia

A by-election was held for the New South Wales Legislative Assembly electorate of Queanbeyan on 24 November 1906 because the seat of Alan Millard (Liberal Reform) was declared vacant because he was convicted of a felony, misappropriating £5 of a client's money.

== Dates ==
Date	Event
2 November 1905	Millard convicted.
1 February 1906	Millard sentenced.
23 February 1906	Supreme Court dismissed Millard's appeal.
12 March 1906	Writ of election issued by the Speaker of the Legislative Assembly.
27 March 1906	Nominations
7 April 1906	Polling day
27 April 1906	High Court refused Millard special leave to appeal.
28 April 1906	Return of writ

== Result ==
1906 Queanbeyan by-election Saturday 7 April
Party	Candidate	Votes	%	±%
Liberal Reform	Granville Ryrie	2,028	51.0	
Labour	Henry Hungerford	1,948	49.0	
Total formal votes		3,976	99.2	
Informal votes		31	0.8	
Turnout		4,007	61.3 (Note: estimate based on an electoral roll of 6,537 at the 1904 election.)	
Liberal Reform hold				

== See also ==
- Electoral results for the district of Queanbeyan
- List of New South Wales state by-elections
