= The Coal Strike =

1906 play by Edward Irham Cole and J. L. Le Breton

- Original language: English
- Written by: Edward Irham Cole; J.L. Le Breton and "suggestions" from Edward William O'Sullivan
- Setting: Newcastle, Australia

Premiere
- Date: 29 September 1906
- Place: Haymarket Hippodrome, Sydney
- Directed by: Edward Irham Cole

The Coal Strike is a 1906 Australian play by Edward Irham Cole and J. L. Le Breton, with "suggestions" from Edward William O'Sullivan. It was called a "political and socialistic drama, depicting the strife between labour and capital."

The play was set in Newcastle, Australia.

The Sydney Morning Herald reported "there was a large audience, who appeared to enjoy the production."
