= With the Colours =

1905 stage drama by Edward Irham Cole

- Original language: English
- Written by: Edward Irham Cole
- Subject: melodrama

Premiere
- Date: 1905
- Directed by: Edward Irham Cole

With the Colours is a 1905 Australian stage drama by Edward Irham Cole set during the Second Boer War. It became one of the key plays in Cole's repertoire.

Crowds during the initial season were excellent. The play was revived in 1906, 1908, 1911, 1912, 1913, 1914 and 1918.

== Premise ==
"A captain of the forty second is under sentence of death for supposed cowardice in action. He entrusts his all to the care of a brother officer, who however betrays his trust and robs the widow and orphan. A very exciting scene takes place at the end of the lirst act, where the captain is placed before a file of his own men and is just about to be shot, when the Boers attack the British camp. A hand to hand battle is fought and some very fine specimens of swordsmanship are shown, with the curtain falling on a British victory with Australians to the front."
