= Edward Irham Cole =

Australian theatrical entrepreneur and film director

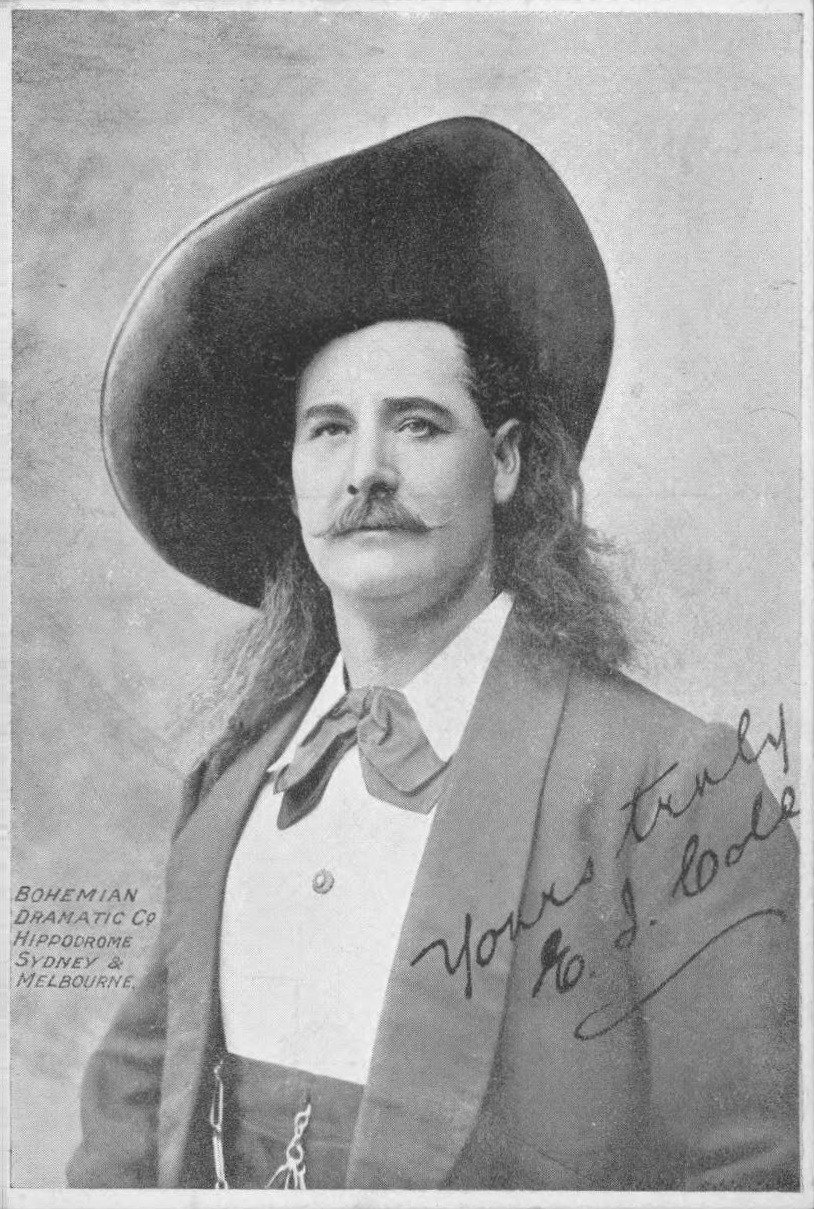
- Portrait of Edward Irham Cole in about 1920.
- Born: Edward Irham Cole; 3 December 1859; Croydon, Surrey, England
- Died: 1 July 1942 (aged 82); Marrickville, New South Wales, Australia
- Occupations: theatrical entrepreneur & film director
- Spouse(s): (1) Ada Dale (2) Lavinia Catherine ('Vene') Smith
- Parent(s): Irham Cole & Isabella (née Jackson)

Edward Irham Cole (3 December 1859 – 1 July 1942) was an Australian theatrical entrepreneur and film director whose productions represented a synthesis of Wild West show and stage melodrama (often with a bushranger theme). He managed a theatre company, called the Bohemian Dramatic Company, that performed in semi-permanent and temporary tent theatres. During 1910 and 1911 Cole directed a number of silent films, adapted from his stage plays and using actors from his theatre company.

== Biography ==
Cole arrived in Australia as a young man and worked for a time in Adelaide before moving to Wilcannia.

He started in showbusiness as a lecturer, calling himself "the Bohemian" and giving presentations on various topics.

He later joined the company of Texas Jack Jr., an American showman in the Buffalo Bill mould. He established the Bohemian Dramatic Company, which toured the country performing shows. At its height, the company included over 60 performers and 20 horses, and was transported in its own train.

In 1910 and 1911 Cole made a series of films adapted from his shows, which cost over £1,000 in all. The longest was reportedly 1,5000 feet. They were sometimes screened accompanied by lectures and songs. Cole toured Tasmania in 1911 and 1912.

By 1926 the company was down to a size of 24 and touring mostly only country areas.

=== Later years ===
Cole's company was still touring in the 1930s as 'Cole's Varieties', run by his son-in-law, Bill Ayr.

Cole and his wife ran a small factory at Marrickville in Sydney which manufactured cowboy outfits for small children.

== Personal life ==
Edward Cole married Ada Dale (1857-1895) in 1884 at Adelaide, South Australia. Edward and Ada had seven (7) children: Mabel, Ethel, Isabella (Belle), Francis (Frank), Ada, Rose, and Myrtle. Ada died while giving birth to Myrtle.

In 1905, Edward Cole married his leading lady, Vene Linden (real name Lavinia Catherine) (1877 - 1948).

Mabel married Cole's leading man, Bill Ayr. They had three children, Ned, Tom and Millie.

In later years, Millie and Ned Ayr would be actors for the company while Tom Ayr handled most of the managerial duties of Cole's Varieties.

In 1931, Edward Cole's wife engaged in a court case against her sister for ownership of their father's cottage.

Edward Cole died on 1 July 1942. His wife died on 8 November 1948, aged 71, survived by their children Frank, Belle, Mabel, Rose and Myrtle; a son, Roy, had predeceased her.

== Filmography ==
- Bushranger's Ransom, or A Ride for Life (1911)
- The Squatter's Son (1911)
- The Five of Hearts (1911)
- Sentenced for Life (1911)
- The Sundowner (1911)
- The Squatter and the Clown

== Select theatre credits ==
=== As writer ===
- Hands Up (1900) - about Ned Kelly
- The King of the Road (1900) – bushranger drama about Ben Hall
- The Missing Partner (1904)
- Sentenced for Life (1904)
- With the Colours (1905)
- For King and Empire (1906)
- Whirlwind, the Bushranger (1907)
- Ransom (1907)
- The Coal Strike
- The Squatter's Son (1910)

=== As performer/producer ===
- Prairie Scout (1903) – performed in the open opposite Redfern Train Station
- Captain Moonlite (1906)
- A Convict's Sweetheart (1906)
- Hunted to Death (1907)
- Outlawed by Fate (1908)
- Thunderbolt, the Bushranger (1908) – Haymarket – about Captain Thunderbolt
- The Indian Hero
- Who is the Woman?
- The Anarchist
- East Lynne
- Uncle Tom's Cabin
- Captain Moonlite
- The Gaol Bird
- Cast Aside
- With the Colours
- Buffalo Bill (1904)
- Jo the Girl Miner (1905)
- The White Slave (1905) – Haymarket Hippodrome, Sydney
- With the Colours – Haymarket Hippodrome, Sydney – drama set during the Second Boer War
- A Priest's Silence (1905)
- Golden Heart (1906)
- Kia Ora (1906) – Haymarket – a four-act Maori drama
- The King of the Roads"/"Under Two Flags/The Hand of Justice (1911) – series of plays performed at Launceston
- The British Spy (1911–12) – Hobart – play set during the Second Boer War
- Golden Heart (1912) – a Spanish-Mexican drama
- It Is Never Too Late to Mend (1912) – Hobart- play based on the convict era novel
- Arrah-Na-Pogue (1912) – Irish drama
- Postmistress of the Czar (1912) – Kings Theatre, Hobart – Anglo-Russian military story
- The Heart of the Bush (1912) – Kings Theatre, Hobart – Australian bush story
- A Woman's Honour (1913)
- Dick Turpin (1914) – Hippodrome
- Captain Starlight, or Robbery Under Arms (1914) – Hippodrome
- The Covenant's Trust (1915)
- Buffalo Bill (1919)
- Meg of Golden Heart/The Octoroon (1919)
- The Ruby Ring (1919)
- The Kelly Gang (1920)
