= The Squatter's Son =

1911 film

- The Age 24 April 1911
- Directed by: E. I. Cole
- Based on: play by E. I. Cole or Clarence Burnett
- Starring: E. I. Cole's Bohemian Dramatic Company
- Production company: Pathé Frères
- Release date: 13 April 1911
- Running time: 3,800 feet
- Country: Australia
- Languages: Silent; English intertitles

The Squatter's Son is an Australian film completed in 1911 and directed by E. I. Cole. It was based on a play which Cole and his company had performed throughout Australia.

It is considered a lost film.

== Plot ==
John Lenton is a squatter who lives at Wilunga. The villainous Dudley Ward also works there. Ward is masquerading at Lenton's nephew, who was murdered overseas by Ward.

Lenton's father refuses to give his son permission to marry Violet Gartson, the woodchipper's daughter. Joe Garston is given £200 by old Lenton to take Violet away from the station. Jack is disinherited by his father for refusing to give up Violet.

Dudley Ward murders Jack's father with Jack's knife. Jack arrested for his father's murder but charge "not proven." Joe Garston, who knows Dudley Ward is the murderer, scorns his offer to marry Violet.

Joe drugged and dragged away to the scrub. Violet finds a letter proving Dudley Ward to be the murderer. Ward's bushranging gang carry Violet off to the Gap. Little Cecil Lenton's birthday. Dudley Ward, who in case of Cecil's death becomes the heir, tries to murder the little chap. Exciting rescue. Jack Lenton falls into the hands of the bushrangers. The denouement; virtue rewarded and vice punished.

=== Film scenes ===
- The two cousins, Jack Lenton and Dudley Ward
- The true and the false - Mr Lenton refuses to let his son Jack to marry the woodchoppers daughter, Violet Garston
- Bribery
- Altering the will - Jack disinherited
- The murderer Jack arrested
- Dudley's scheming
- Old Garston knows the murderer
- Drugged by Dudley
- The Bushrangers
- Dudley the chief
- The little heir Dudley Ward next in succession
- attempted assassination
- Gallant rescue
- Violet and Jack in the hands of bushrangers
- Saved by a faithful horse
- Mulga Joe, the black boy, destroys the bridge
- Escape
- The squatter's son comes in to his own

== Original play ==
The Squatter's Son
- Original language: English
- Written by: Edward Irham Cole or Clarence Burnett
- Subject: bushrangers
- Genre: melodrama

Premiere
- Date: 21 January 1910
- Place: Coliseum, Ballarat
- Directed by: Edward Irham Cole

Authorship of the play is sometimes attributed to Clarence Burnett. Other accounts say it was Cole.

The play debuted in Ballarat in early 1910. Reviewing this performance, the Ballarat Star said "there is a high- standard of excellence, in the'plot, which Is of a very sensational nature, cleverly worked out. It is full of incident, and the scenery is typical! of Australia."

In October 1910 the play was described as "the most famous" of Cole's "repertoire of pieces". It was often revived throughout Cole's career.

The play was beig performed as late as 1920.

== Production ==
The Squatter's Son was filmed at locations "in the vicinity of Melbourne".

The film was told in 25 scenes with the main characters being two cousins.

== Reception ==
The Geelong Advertiser said of the film "the drama is most sensation and exciting and well portrayed. It had a decidedly Australian flavor, embracing as it does every phase of bush life, from the squatter to the sundowner and the blackfellow. In addition to the sensationalism the fun was fast and furious and kept the large and appreciative audience in a continued state of laughter."

The Argus said "the settings are artistic and natural and the acting good."

The Ballarat Star said it "elicited much applause" from the audience.

The Prahran Telegraph said it was "admirably arranged, acted and reproduced... it is not one of those stories in which the bush criminals become heroes."

According to the Perth Sunday Times the film's (unnamed) star "is a magnificent type of the Australian bushman. During the action of the photographic drama, the chief artist rides, shoots, fights and swims and hews trees, he being a handsome, muscular athlete who was specially selected for his splendid qualities. He is, or was, a tip-top amateur actor, but is now being rushed with engagements by Eastern managers." The same paper in a different review praised the film as "a gem of cinematography".

The Launceston Daily Telegraph praised the "story being comprehensively portrayed in a concise manner, lacking us it docs the unnecessary padding so frequent in Australian motion dramas."

The Kalgoorlie Miner claimed "As a sample of an Australian dramatic film The Squatter's Son stands in the front rank, and it gives a reflex. of the ups and downs of life as it occurred in the adventurous days."
