= Outlawed by Fate =

1908 Australian stage play

Outlawed by Fate, or the Bushranger's Bride is a 1908 Australian stage play that was presented by Edward Irham Cole's Bohemian Dramatic Company.

The Sydney Sportsman said "To those of the public who like thrilling and sensational incidents, the present programme may be confidently recommended."

The play toured to Melbourne and was revived in 1912 and 1913.
