= A Convict's Sweetheart =

1906 Australian play

A Convict's Sweetheart is a 1906 Australian play performed by Edward Irham Cole's Bohemian Dramatic Company. It may have been written by Cole.

The play was called "an English rural piece dealing with gambling and drink" and "a thrilling drama of the early Australian days."

The Sunday Sun said "The leading characters were well sustained by Vene Linden, W. H. Ayr, and Percy Goodwin, who were ably supported by the other members of the company."

The play was revived on several occasions.
