= John James Wright =

Australian politician

John James Wright (20 February 1821 – 22 October 1904) was an Australian flour miller, local government councillor, local government head, member of the Parliament of New South Wales, orangeman and store/shopkeeper.

== Early life ==
Wright was born in Ballina in County Mayo, Ireland, the son of John Wright.

== Legislative Assembly ==
Wright contested the Legislative Assembly seat of Queanbeyan at the 1874–75 election, winning with 455 votes (53.3%). He did not stand for re-election in 1877, and was unsuccessful in attempts to regain the seat in 1882, and 1885. He did not hold ministerial office.

Wright died in Queanbeyan on 22 October 1901 (aged 80).

New South Wales Legislative Assembly
Preceded by Leopold De Salis	Member for Queanbeyan; 1874–1877	Succeeded by James Thompson
