= Bushranger's Ransom, or A Ride for Life =

1911 Australian silent film

- Sunday Times 26 Mar 1911
- Directed by: Mrs E. I. Cole (Lavinia Catherine)
- Based on: play by E. I. Cole
- Produced by: Pathé Frères'
- Starring: E. I. Cole's Bohemian Dramatic Company 'Mulga' Fred Wilson; William Keightley
- Distributed by: Pathe Freres
- Release date: 28 March 1911
- Running time: 2,500 feet
- Country: Australia
- Languages: Silent; English intertitles

Bushranger's Ransom, or A Ride for Life was an Australian silent film produced by Pathé Frères' in 1911, their first motion picture production in Australia after establishing a branch office in Sydney in April 1910. It was adapted from a stage play first performed in 1907 by E. I. Cole's Bohemian Dramatic Company.

The play and film were based on actual events, namely the raid in October 1863 on Keightley's 'Dunn's Plains' homestead, south of Bathurst, by the bushranger Ben Hall and his gang.

Actors of the Bohemian Dramatic Company performed in the film. An Aboriginal man, 'Mulga' Fred Wilson, was also a cast member, advertised as "the first Australian aboriginal actor to appear in a photo play".

Bushranger's Ransom is considered a lost film.

== Plot ==
In 1863 Ben Hall and his men, Johnny Gilbert, John O'Meally, John Vane and Rick Burke hide out at their camp at the Black Stump, close to Rockley, overlooking the Bathurst-road. Their guard is the aboriginal Mulga Fred.

After a successful raid upon Bathurst, Hall discovers that the gold commissioner at Dunn's Plains, near Rockley (about 30 miles from Bathurst), had determined to break up the gang.

Hall led a raid on Keightley's house. Warned by his son, Cyril, of the bushrangers' approach, Mr. Keightley accompanied by his wife and a friend, Dr. Pechey, barricaded themselves in the house, where they resisted for six hours.

The bushrangers drew straws to see who should blow the lock of the door open. The loser was Mick Bourke who was accidentally shot by a comrade. In his pain he asked to be put out of his misery and Ben Hall did so.

Eventually the defenders surrender, their ammunition having run out. John Vane wanted to shoot Keightley in revenge for Bourke but Hall refuses to do so. Hall and his men spend the night at the homestead.

Hall offers to spare Mr. Keightley's life if he can raise £500 and gives his wife eight hours to ride 62 miles to Bathurst to collect the money from her father at the bank. She manages to accomplish this just before the bushrangers are about to shoot Keightley, and Hall leaves the homestead with the Keightleys alive.

=== Characters ===
- Ben Hall, Chief of the Bushranging Gang, 26;
- Johnnie Gilbert, a Bushranger, 20;
- John O'Meally, a Bushranger, 22;
- John Vane, a Bushranger, 19;
- Mike Rourke, a Bushranger; 24;
- Mulga Fred, an aboriginal;
- Mr. Keightley, Gold Commissioner;
- Mrs. Keightley, his wife;
- Cyril Keightley, their son;
- Dr. Pechey, a friend;
- Bushrangers, servants.

== Cast ==
- 'Mulga' Fred Wilson – "the first Australian aboriginal actor to appear in a photo play".
- William Keightley – son of Henry and Caroline Keightley (the victims of the raid on their homestead by Hall and his gang).

== Original play ==
Ransom
- Original language: English
- Written by: Edward Irham Cole
- Based on: the life of Ben Hall
- Genre: melodrama

Premiere
- Date: May 1907
- Directed by: Edward Irham Cole

The Bohemian Dramatic Company produced a play based on the Keightley raid called Ransom in May 1907. It was revived in January 1908 as A Bushranger's Ransom.

The play had been performed throughout Australia by Cole's Bohemian Dramatic Company.

The play appeared to have a slightly different plot to the film.

== Production ==
According to contemporary advertisements, "all the pictures were taken on the spot, and are an exact representation of the actual occurrences."

'Mulga' Fred Wilson, who appeared in the film, was an aboriginal buckjumper of the time who frequently appeared in touring shows. The movie also starred William Keightley, son of the real life Keightley.

A contemporary newspaper report said the film was "arranged by Mrs E. I. Cole" implying that it was E. I. Cole's wife who directed it.

== Reception ==
The Advertiser called the film "a .capital representation of the play, which portrays a striking and thrilling episode in the career of Ben Hall."
