= Thomas Rutledge (1819–1904) =

By-election in New South Wales, Australia

Thomas Rutledge (12 March 1819 – 23 November 1904) was an Irish-born politician and pastoralist in New South Wales, Australia.

He was born at Ballynagdine in County Cavan to landowner James Rutledge and Martha Foster. In 1841 he migrated to New South Wales to Carwoola Station, owned by his brother William Rutledge, and purchased it off his brother not long after. He subsequently acquired several other pastoral properties, which he handed down to his sons over time. He became a Justice of the Peace in 1857 and was a magistrate for many years. He was also involved in horse racing, and owned Yattendon, the winner of the 1886 Sydney Cup.

He was elected to the New South Wales Legislative Assembly in the 1881 by-election, but retired at the general election in 1882 for health reasons and temporarily went to England in an attempt to recover.

Rutledge was ill for some years prior to his death. Rutledge died at Carwoola Homestead in 1904 (aged 86) from what was attributed as "senile decay" and was buried in the graveyard of St. Thomas' Church of England at Carwoola.

New South Wales Legislative Assembly
Preceded by James Thompson	Member for Queanbeyan; 1881–1882	Succeeded by George De Salis
