= The Missing Partner =

1904 Australian play by Edward Irham Cole

- Original language: English
- Written by: Edward Irham Cole

Premiere
- Date: January 20, 1904
- Place: Sydney
- Directed by: Edward Irham Cole

The Missing Partner, or the Swagman is a 1904 Australian play by Edward Irham Cole. The play was set in the world of mining.

The play was part of the Australian "bushranging play" boom of the 1900s.

It debuted in 1904 and was revived several times by Cole including seasons in 1906 and 1907. Cole usually played the lead character, called "The Unknown".

The Sydney Morning Herald said "The piece is interesting and exciting, with a strong vein of humour running through it."

One review said "it gives a vivid insight into mining life in Australia. The principal characters were well interpreted by Misses Linden and Cole, and Messrs. Cole, Ayr, and Phillips. The mounting was adequate, and Mr. Gray's orchestra supplied some spirited music."

== Premise ==
"The overseer of the Carleton homestead is a picturesque figure, called among the station hands "The Unknown." He saves Alma Carleton from accident when her horse is bolting for the river. Barry Graham allows the mother to believe he saved Alma. Graham robs Mrs. Carleton of some jewels, and circumstances point to 'The Unknown" as the culprit. Graham "bails up" a coach, disguised as "The Unknown" who is blamed for it until the mystery is cleared up by "Old Mat," a swagman, who wanders through the early portion of the drama in a demented state, but finally recovers his reason and solves the problem of "The Unknown"."
