= William Redman (politician) =

Australian politician

William Redman (20 October 1823 – 15 September 1882) was an Australian politician.

He was born in Sydney to gentleman John Redman and Mary George. He married Adeline Cecilia Carrington, but the marriage was childless. In 1846 he qualified as a solicitor, practising in Sydney. In 1860 he was elected to the New South Wales Legislative Assembly for Queanbeyan, but he did not re-contest in 1864. Redman died at Canterbury in 1882.

New South Wales Legislative Assembly
Preceded by William Forster	Member for Queanbeyan; 1860–1864	Succeeded by Leopold De Salis
