= Leopold William Jerome Fane De Salis =

Australian politician

Leopold William Jerome Fane De Salis (12 June 1845 – 3 August 1930) was an Australian politician.

== Family ==
He was the son of Leopold Fane De Salis and Charlotte Macdonald; his brother George De Salis would also enter politics.

His grandson Flt Lt (John) Peter Fane de Salis (28 April 1928 - January 2005) flew the Canberra of 76 Sqn, where on April 9 1958, over Monyash in Derbyshire, his grandson ejected at 56,000ft, which is the highest ejection by an aircraft.

== Career ==
He was elected to the New South Wales Legislative Assembly for Queanbeyan in 1872, but did not re-contest in 1874. He managed the family estates in Queensland until 1892, when they were lost in the economic crash. In 1895 he married Jeanette Armstrong. De Salis moved to England in 1910 and died in 1930 at Laleham.

New South Wales Legislative Assembly
Preceded by William Forster	Member for Queanbeyan; 1872–1874	Succeeded by John Wright
