= Hands Up (Cole play) =

1900 Australian play

Hands Up, or Ned Kelly and His Gang
- Sunday Sun 31 March 1907
- Original language: English
- Written by: Edward Irham Cole
- Subject: Ned Kelly
- Genre: melodrama
- Setting: Colonial Victoria

Premiere
- Date: 6 January 1900
- Place: Corner Queen and Wharf Street, Brisbane
- Directed by: Edward Irham Cole

Hands Up, or Ned Kelly and His Gang is a 1900 Australian play by Edward Irham Cole about Ned Kelly.

It appeared to make its debut in 1900. The play was one of a large number of dramas about Ned Kelly that followed from the success of The Kelly Gang in 1898.

Cole performed it, originally with his Wild West Dramatic Company (which he ran with "Texas Jack Jr."), then with his own Bohemian Drama Company. It was one of their most popular works.

There were productions of the play in 1903, 1904, 1907 (In Melbourne and Sydney) and 1909.

== Critical reaction ==
The Brisbane Courier said "The performance... went very well through-out, and was freely applauded, the various thrilling events of the drama being graphically portrayed by the various members of the company, who seemed thoroughly at home in their delineations of the rougher parts of bush life."

The Melbourne Herald noted that "a departure from the usual rule observed in dealing with the bushrangers is made, in that the police are not held up to ridicule, but are treated with a respect not always accorded the "force."... The author has striven to portray the history of the outlaws, as far as the stage allows, rather than to present overdrawn, sensational pictures."

== Synopsis ==
- ACT I – Scene 1: Kelly’s Home at Greta – The Warrant. Scene 2 : Interior of Kelly’s Home – Shooting of Fitzpatrick. Scene 3 • Superintendent of Police Quarters at Benalla. Scene 4: In the Ranges – Kate’s Message. Scene 5: Police Quarters, Benalla. Scene 6: Kennedy’s Camp – “ Hands Up” – Death of Sergeant Kennedy
- ACT II – Scene 1 : Interior of Euroa Bank – The Robbery. Scene 2 : Police Quarters. Scene 3: Jerilderie Police Station. Scene 4 : Bush Track – The Gang at Work. Scene 5 : Interior of Sherritt's Home – Death of Sherritt. Scene 6: In the Bush – Ready for the Train. Scene 7 : Special Police Train – Kernewtothe Rescue
- ACT III – Scene 1: Interior of Mrs. Jones’ Hotel, Glenrowan Scene 2: In the Bush – Ned Kelly in Armour. Scene 3 : Battle of Glenrowan – Ned Kelly's Last Stand

== Original 1900 Cast ==
- JB North as Ned Kelly
- WJ Ogle as Dan Kelly
- O Atfield as Steve Hart
- R James as Joe Byrne
- WF Rivenshill as Aaron Sherritt
- G. Linden as Sergeant Kennedy
- J. Hayward as Serjeant Steele
- A. Pierce as Fitzpatrick
- Vene Linden, as Kate Kelly
- Miss Silverster as Mrs.Kelly
- Ethel Linden as the servant maid Becky
- Miss Nellie Bradshaw as Mrs. Sherritt
- F Waters as the bank manager
