= Electoral district of Queanbeyan =

Former state electoral district of New South Wales, Australia

Queanbeyan was an electoral district of the Legislative Assembly in the Australian state of New South Wales from 1859 to 1913, in the Queanbeyan area. It replaced parts of the electoral district of United Counties of Murray and St Vincent and the electoral district of Southern Boroughs. It was merged with the electoral district of Monaro in 1913, when much of its former territory had been absorbed in the Australian Capital Territory.

== Members for Queanbeyan ==
Member	Party	Term
William Forster	None	1859–1860
William Redman	None	1860–1864
Leopold Fane De Salis	None	1864–1869
William Forster	None	1869–1872
Leopold William De Salis	None	1872–1874
John Wright	None	1874–1877
James Thompson	None	1877–1881
Thomas Rutledge	None	1881–1882
George De Salis	None	1882–1885
Edward O'Sullivan	None	1885–1887
Edward O'Sullivan	Protectionist	1887–1901
Edward O'Sullivan	Progressive	1901–1904
Alan Millard	Liberal Reform	1904–1906
Granville Ryrie	Liberal Reform	1906–1910
John Cusack	Labor	1910–1913

== Election results ==
1910 New South Wales state election: Queanbeyan
Party	Candidate	Votes	%	±%
Labour	John Cusack	2,522	51.0	+6.9
Liberal Reform	Joseph Roberts	2,424	49.0	−6.7
Total formal votes		4,946	97.6	+0.2
Informal votes		120	2.4	−0.2
Turnout		5,066	75.3	−3.6
Labour gain from Liberal Reform				

- Granville Ryrie had won Queanbeyan at the 1907 election; however, he resigned to contest the seat of Werriwa at the 1910 federal election. The by-election in April 1910 was won by John Cusack (Labour) who retained the seat at the 1910 general election.
