= Alan Millard (politician) =

Australian politician (1856–1915)

Alan Major Millard (29 April 1856 – 6 July 1915) was an English solicitor who became an Australian politician.

He was born in Langport in Somerset to accountant James Millard and Margaret Major. He was admitted as a solicitor in England in 1879 and practised in Bristol before coming to Australia in 1890. He had married Florence Hawkins on 19 April 1881 at Gloucester. He worked at the mines at Captains Flat before being admitted to practise as a solicitor in 1893, settling at Bungendore. He was a supporter of the temperance movement in Australia, belonging to both the Good Templars and the Christian Temperance Union.

In August 1904 he was elected to the New South Wales Legislative Assembly as the Liberal member for Queanbeyan.

In September 1905 Millard was committed to stand trial on charges that he had misappropriated £5 of a client's money. He conducted his own defence before Judge Murray and a jury in the Court of quarter sessions. He was convicted of larceny as a bailee, with Judge Murray describing the offence as having occurred under a "reckless departure from sobriety", and sentenced to 6 months imprisonment, suspended on the condition that he enter into a 12 month good behaviour bond. Judge Murray reserved a question of law to the Supreme Court, however the Full Court upheld the conviction and ordered that his name be struck off the roll of solicitors. He sought special leave to appeal to the High Court however this was refused.

After his appeal was dismissed by the Supreme Court, his seat in parliament was declared vacant and a writ was issued for a by-election on 7 April.

Millard told the Court of Quarter Sessions that he "won the Victoria Cross as a member of the Life Guards", subsequently said to have been won during the Anglo-Zulu War. There does not appear to be any substance to his claims as neither military service nor Victoria Cross are mentioned in his parliamentary biography, and his name is not included on the Victoria Cross Register.

Millard did not return to politics, and died in Sydney in 1915 (aged 59).

New South Wales Legislative Assembly
Preceded by Edward O'Sullivan	Member for Queanbeyan; 1904–1906	Succeeded by Granville Ryrie
