= John Cusack (Australian politician) =

Australian politician

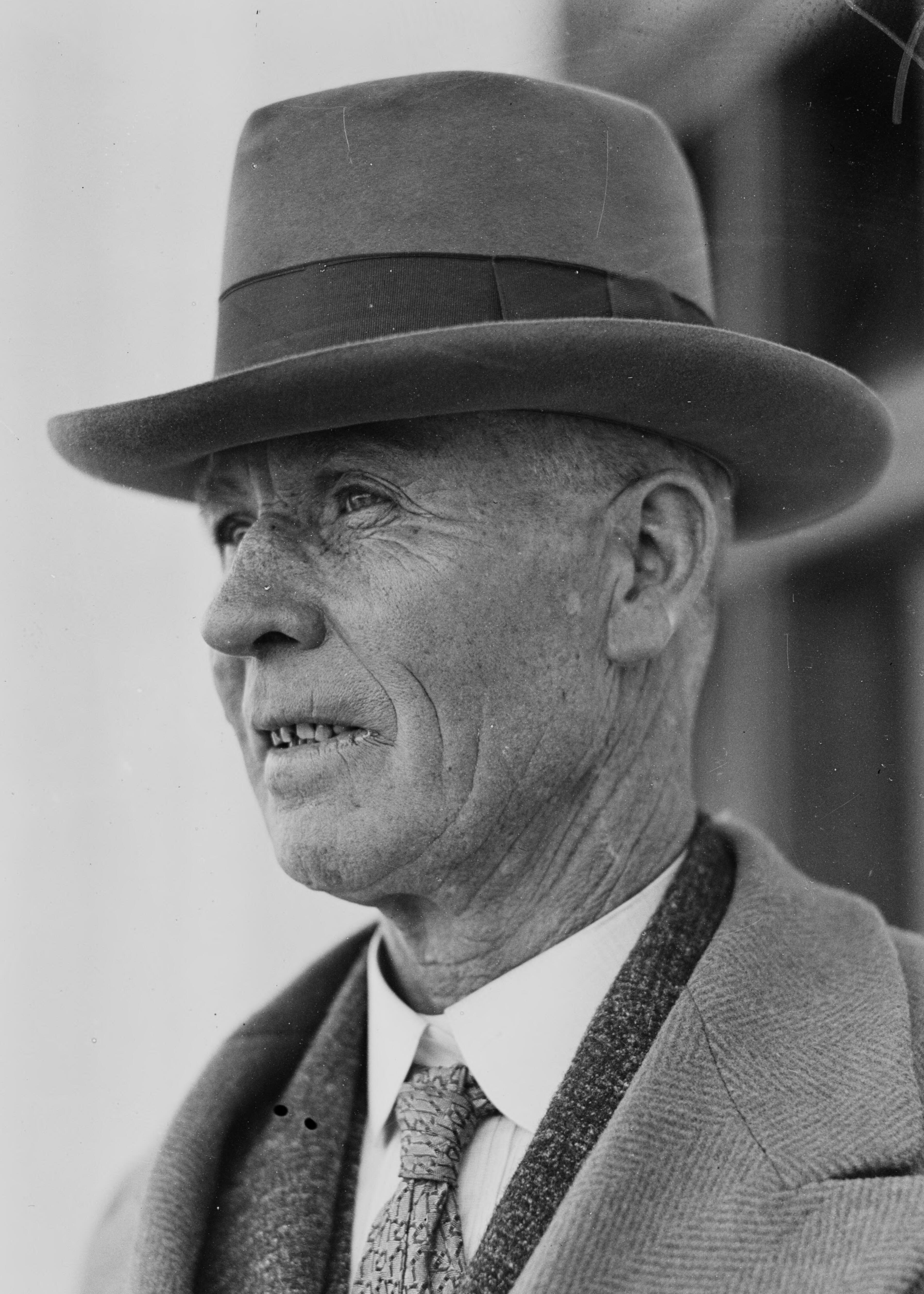

Member of the Australian Parliament for Eden-Monaro
- In office 12 October 1929 – 19 December 1931
- Preceded by: John Perkins
- Succeeded by: John Perkins

Personal details
- Born: 8 August 1868 Yass, New South Wales
- Died: 8 September 1956 (aged 88) Canberra, Australia
- Party: Australian Labor Party
- Spouse: Minnie Cassidy
- Relations: Dymphna Cusack (niece)
- Children: Two sons; a daughter
- Occupation: Blacksmith

John Joseph Cusack (8 August 1868 – 8 September 1956) was an Australian politician and businessman. He was a member of the Australian Labor Party (ALP) for most of his career and served in the New South Wales Legislative Assembly (1910–1917) and House of Representatives (1929–1931).

== Early life ==
Cusack was born at Bellevale near Yass, New South Wales and had some schooling in Yass. He was apprenticed at 15 to a blacksmith at Berrima. He learnt about coachbuilding in Sydney and returned to Yass in 1898 to marry Minnie Cassidy and start a coachbuilding business. He was elected to Yass Municipal Council and was mayor in 1904.

== Parliamentary career ==
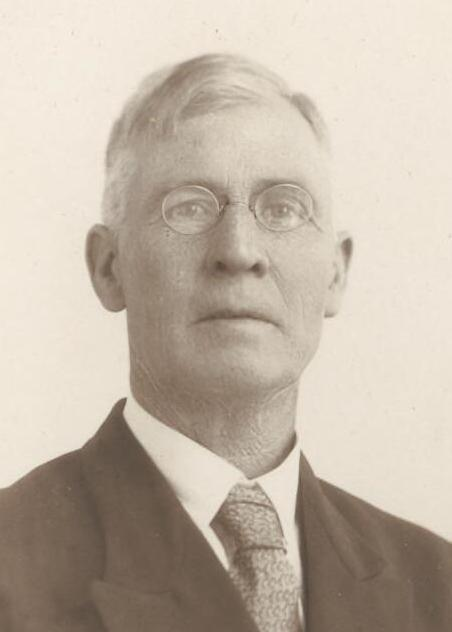
John Cusack

Cusack established a branch of the Labor League (the predecessor of the Labor Party) in Yass in the 1890s. He represented Queanbeyan from 1910 to 1913, and Albury from 1913 to 1917 in the New South Wales Legislative Assembly. He was one of only four Labor members to hold the seat of Albury. Following the ALP split of 1916, he was expelled from the party for failing to support a no-confidence motion against the new government formed by ALP defector William Holman. However, he was later readmitted.

In 1929, Cusack was elected to the House of Representatives for Eden-Monaro, surviving a petition by his defeated opponent John Perkins. He attempted to switch to Cowper at the 1931 election but was defeated by Earle Page. He stood unsuccessfully for several state elections up to 1953, when he failed, at age 80, as an Independent, to unseat the sitting Labor member for Burrinjuck, Billy Sheahan. After the election, Cusack accused Sheahan, then NSW Attorney General, of "assist[ing] a masonic vendetta" against him. In 1954, as a vigorous, though erratic, 85-year old, he contested the federal lower-house seat of Australian Capital Territory. He received around 3% of first preference votes and lost his deposit.

== Later life ==
After his earlier electoral defeats, Cusack returned to his work as a blacksmith in Yass. He died in the old Canberra Hospital and was survived by his wife, three sons (Linton, Stan and Greg) and a daughter (Ursula). His son Stan established a successful furniture business in Canberra, following the development of the area as the Australian Capital Territory. Dymphna Cusack was his niece. His great-granddaughter Catherine Cusack was elected as a Liberal Party member of the New South Wales Legislative Council in 2003.

== Notes ==
New South Wales Legislative Assembly
Preceded by Granville Ryrie	Member for Queanbeyan; 1910–1913	Succeeded by Abolished
Preceded by Gordon McLaurin	Member for Albury; 1913–1917	Succeeded by Arthur Manning
Parliament of Australia
Preceded by John Perkins	Member for Eden-Monaro; 1929–1931	Succeeded by John Perkins
