= Edward William O'Sullivan =

Politician and journalist in New South Wales, Australia

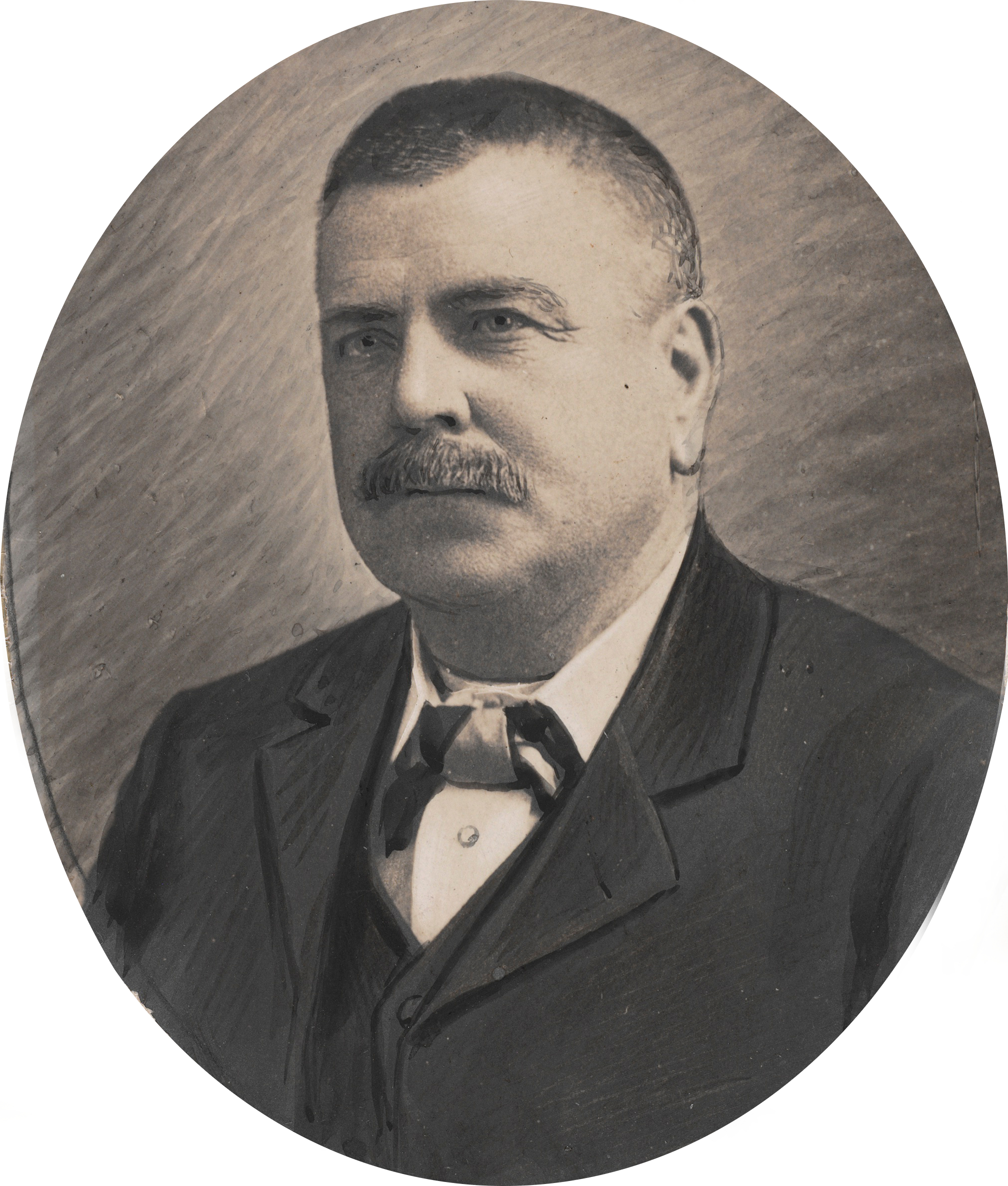
Mr Edward William O'Sullivan MLA

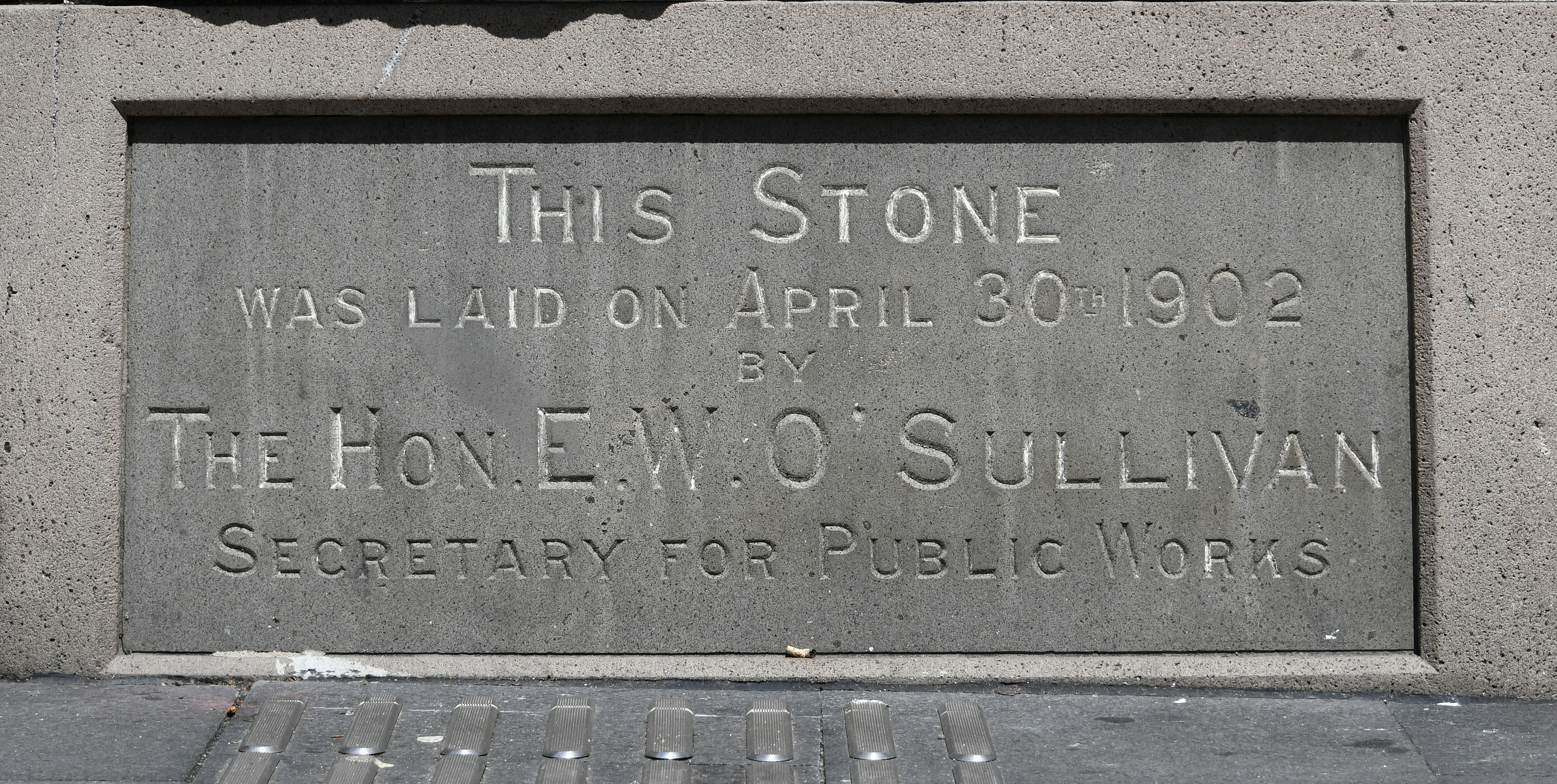
Foundation stone at Central Railway Station, Sydney, bearing O'Sullivan's name

Edward William O'Sullivan (17 March 1846 – 25 April 1910) was an Australian journalist and politician.

== Early life and journalism ==
O'Sullivan was born in Launceston, Van Diemen's Land. His father deserted the family when he was a child and he was mainly educated by his mother Mary Ann who was the daughter of Edward Burgoyne, a soldier of the 63rd regiment (born Derry, Ireland c.1794) by his wife Catherine Cruise. He was bright and intelligent, graduated at the desk, and became, when still young, a reporter for that paper. In 1878, he married Agnes Ann Firman and started working a The Argus.

In 1884, he founded a working man's party the Democratic Alliance and its newspaper the Democrat, but both failed. In 1884 O'Sullivan was part of a land reform conference, which included Paddy Crick, Louis Heydon and Adolphus Taylor to "establish a political organisation of the agricultural, mining, and working classes of New South Wales, in order to initiate a more liberal and progressive policy for the colony", a protectionist party that became known as the Land and Industrial Alliance.

In 1909 he became the third President of the New South Wales Rugby League in the year after incumbent secretary and founding father of the game Henry Hoyle resigned. Hoyle was replaced by ECV Broughton, however he stood down after just less than a month due to poor health. O'Sullivan resigned as a matter of principle, upon learning that a secret faction within the NSWRL had been plotting to pay the amateur Rugby Union Wallabies players to play games against the Australian national rugby league team, the Kangaroos.

== Parliamentary career ==
He first stood for the legislative assembly for the district of West Sydney, at the 1882 election but was unsuccessful with a margin of 549 votes (3.9%). He stood again in 1885, this time for South Sydney but was again unsuccessful with a margin of 882 votes (6.1%). A week later he was elected for Queanbeyan, with the assistance of the Queanbeyan Age, edited by his friend, John Gale and Louis Heydon, the member for Yass Plains. He held the seat until 1904.

In September 1899, O'Sullivan became Secretary for Public Works in the Lyne ministry, and held the same position when John See became Premier until June 1904. During his period of Works administration he spent £126,700 on roads and bridges out of revenue, and £1,341,341 out of loans on roads, harbours and rivers, and buildings. On water conservation works he spent £196,600, and on railways £2,964,400. On tramways he expended over half a million; on metropolitan water works another half-million. Country towns water supplies took £172,000, while a quarter of a million more went for sewerage and stormwater drainage. A further £40,000 odd was devoted to the Hunter water supply. Central railway station was described in his obituary as the chief monument to his genius, while The Bulletin was less complimentary.

O'Sullivan held office for a few weeks in the Waddell ministry in 1904 as Secretary for Lands. He switched to Belmore from 1904 which he represented for six years. He was elected an alderman on the City of Sydney for Cook Ward in December 1906, serving until his death in April 1910. Of his later years, The Sydney Morning Herald said "He did good work, not only in the council, but on the health, finance, and works committees. He spoke seldom, but always to the point, and was regular in his attendance both at council and in committee. But it was not the O'Sullivan of 20, or even 10, years back. He was unobtrusive rather than assertive. He did not bring to the council the fiery enthusiasm of his earlier days. His step had become less firm, and he lacked the strong grip of affairs which had been his".

== Death ==
O'Sullivan died at Mosman of blood poisoning after a protracted illness, and left a widow and five children.

== Literary works ==
O'Sullivan had three melodramas produced: Cooee Eureka Stockade and Keane, of Kalgoorlie (filmed in 1911). During the 1890s he published Esperanza: a Tale of Three Colonies, and in 1906, Under the Southern Cross: Australian Sketches, Stories and Speeches.

He also made "suggestions" to the play The Coal Strike.

Parliament of New South Wales
Political offices
Preceded by Charles Lee	Secretary for Public Works; 1899 – 1904	Succeeded by Walter Bennett
Preceded by Paddy Crick	Secretary for Lands; June – August 1904	Succeeded by James Ashton
New South Wales Legislative Assembly
Preceded by George De Salis	Member for Queanbeyan; 1885 – 1904	Succeeded by Alan Millard
Preceded by New seat	Member for Belmore; 1904 – 1910	Succeeded by Patrick Minahan
