= George De Salis =

Australian politician

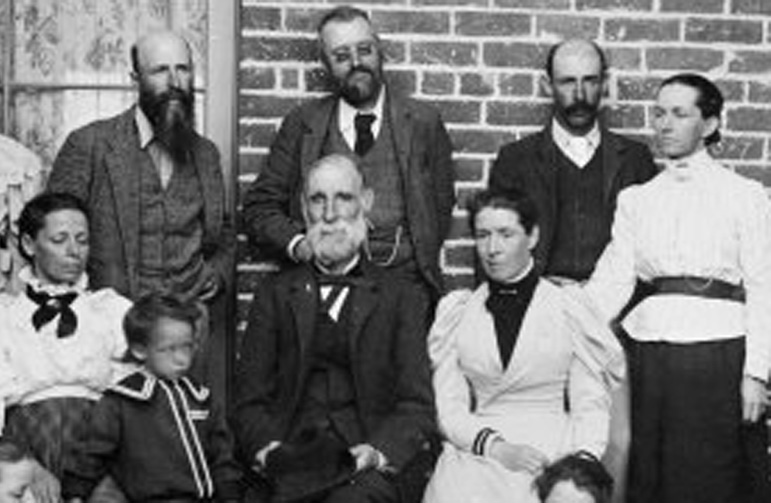
Farrer and De Salis Families

George Fane De Salis (c. 1851 – 30 December 1931) was an Australian politician.

He was born on Darbalara Station near Gundagai to pastoralist Leopold Fane De Salis and Charlotte Macdonald. He received a private education and then farmed at Tharwa and Michelago. On 28 February 1878 he married Mary Galliard-Smith, with whom he had eight children. He was elected to the New South Wales Legislative Assembly for Queanbeyan in 1882, but did not re-contest in 1885. De Salis died at Michelago in 1931.

New South Wales Legislative Assembly
| Preceded by Thomas Rutledge | Member for Queanbeyan; 1882–1885 | Succeeded by Edward O'Sullivan |
