= Sentenced for Life (1911 film) =

- Hamilton Spectator 10 May 1911
- Directed by: Edward Irham Cole
- Based on: play Sentenced for Life
- Starring: Bohemian Dramatic Company
- Production company: Australian Biograph Company
- Distributed by: Pathes Freres
- Release date: 29 May 1911
- Running time: 2,000 feet or 1,250 feet
- Country: Australia
- Languages: Silent film English intertitles

Sentenced for Life is an Australian film directed by E. I. Cole. It was an adaptation of a play performed by Cole and his Bohemian Dramatic Company as early as 1904.

It has been called, Sentenced for Life, or the ship owner's daughter.

It is considered a lost film.

== Plot ==
A man is wrongly convicted and sentenced as a convict. According to a contemporary report, "Vivid convict scenes are enacted, ending with a revolt by the prisoners. There is a happy ending of wedding bells." It turns out the young man's rival was responsible and he is punished.

It was set in Van Diemen's Land although one report claims it was New South Wales

The story starts in England, A shipowner's daughter is loved by two men, an artistocrat, Captain Hood, and a poorer man, Hayward. The aristocrtat frames Hayward for a crime he did not commit and is transported to Australia. The daughter proves the aristocrat a criminal and he is transposrted too. In Australia, prisoners revolt. Hayward is accused of leading the rebellion by the aristocrat and is whipped. However Hood on his deathbed confesses to his crimes. Hayward is restored to his girl and they get married.

Chapter headings were:

- the favourite
- it did look suspicious
- the blackmailer
- Outlaw and the Child
- Slight Breeze
- Malaysia
- General Commotion
- Blighted Hopes
- Manufacture of Almonds

== Original play ==
Sentenced for Life
- Original language: English
- Written by: Edward Irham Cole
- Subject: melodrama

Premiere
- Date: 1904
- Directed by: Edward Irham Cole

The play debuted in 1904.

One review said "The convict scenes in Australia were well mounted, and the entertainment as a whole most praiseworthy."

The play was popular and was revive in 1906, 1907, 1908 and several other times.

The play was also known as A Convict's Sweetheart.

=== Cast of theatre production ===
In 1911 the cast of a theatre production of the play in Geelong was listed as follows:

- E. I. Cole as Mr. Bertram,
- Mr. Frank Mills as Richard Hayward,
- W. S. Marshall as Jabez Ooh
- J. R. Wilson as Sammy Traddles
- Vene Linden as Mary Bertram

It is highly likely at least some of these actors repeated their performance in the film.

== Reception ==
The Adelaide Register called it "a particularly fine film".

Perth's Sunday Times said "This paper's recent remarks on the general awfulness of bushranging films has had a desired effect. More than one Westralian bio. firm has wired over to the East excerpts from our notice on some of the celluloid atrocities. Sentenced, for Life and Ben Hall are therefore gone to join the English Clarendon comic films that shocked this State a while back."
