= Leopold Fane De Salis =

Australian politician

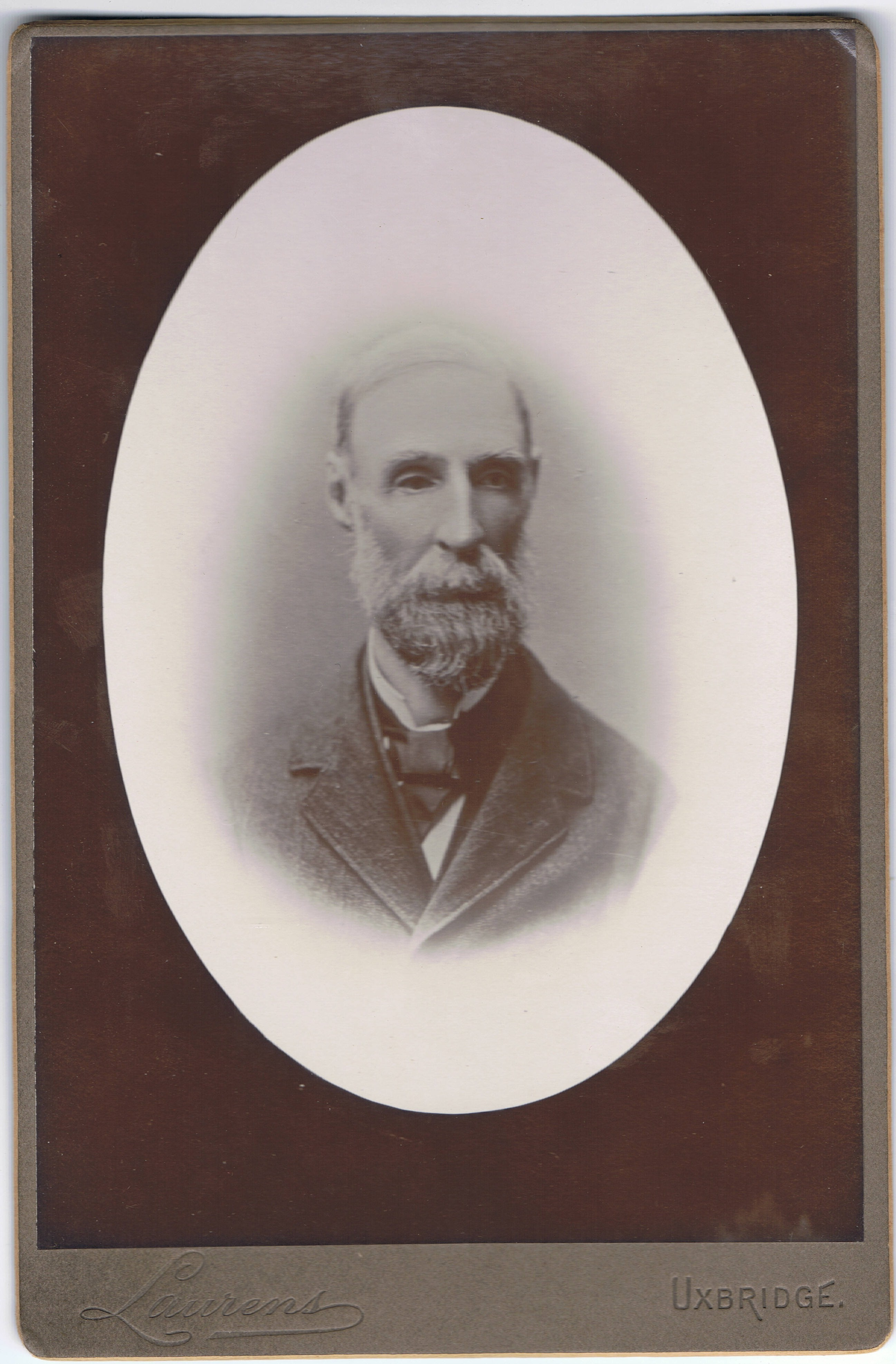
Count Leo in 1893

Leopold Fabius Dietegen Fane de Salis (26 April 1816 – 20 November 1898) was a Tuscan-born Australian pastoralist and politician.

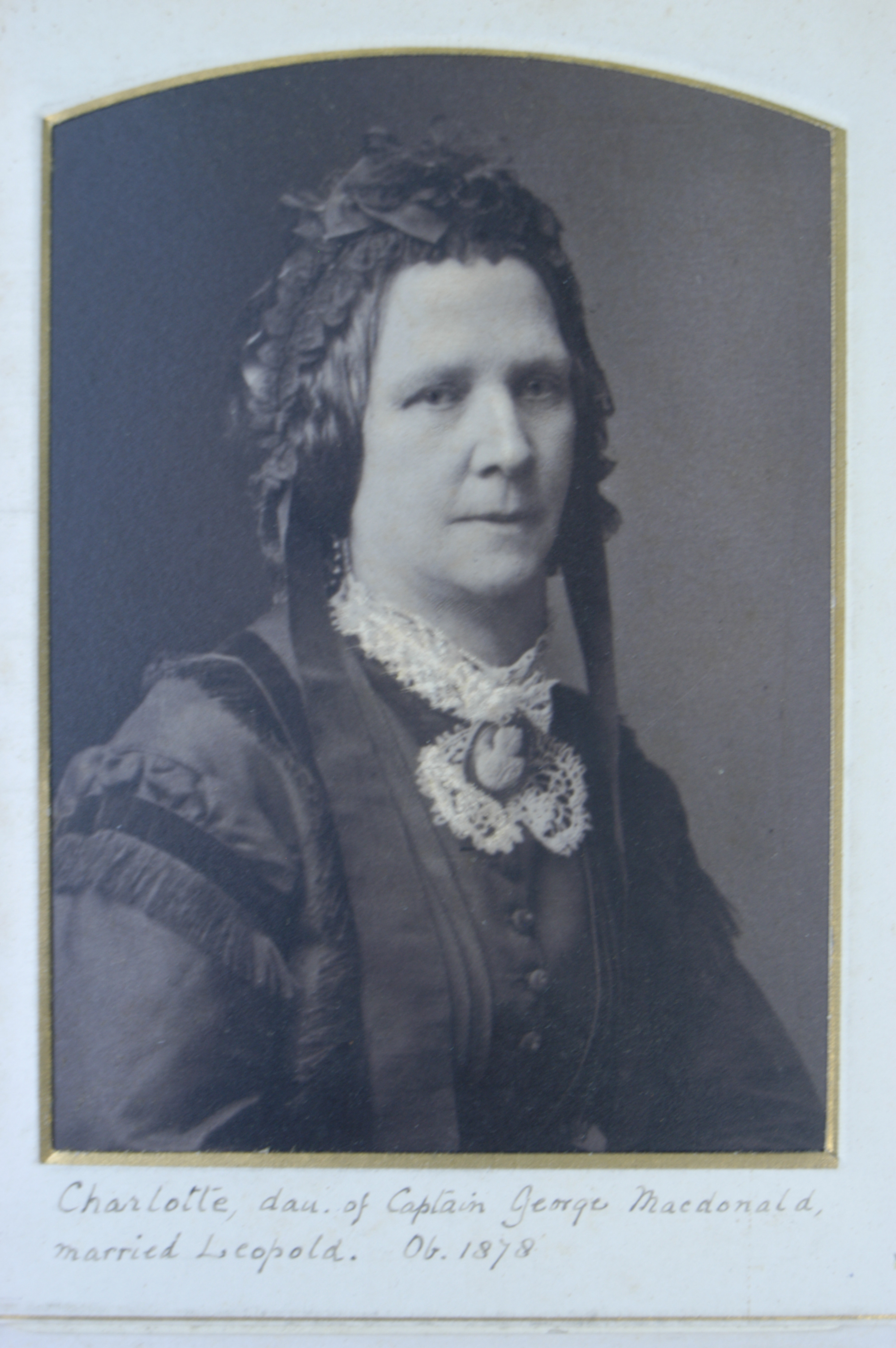
Charlotte MacDonald (d.1878).

Born in Florence to Jerome, 4th Count de Salis-Soglio and Henrietta Foster, he attended Eton College and studied sheep farming at Jedburgh in Scotland. In 1840 he migrated to Sydney, where he formed a partnership to run a station at Junee. In the same decade, in 1842, 1844 and 1848, his highly capable next elder brother William also sailed to Australia. They did much business together.

In 1844 he married Charlotte Macdonald, with whom he had four children, two of whom (George and Leopold) would later become politicians themselves. In 1855 he sold out and bought the Cuppacumbalong station at Tharwa, later purchasing further property on the Murrumbidgee River. In 1864 he was elected to the New South Wales Legislative Assembly for Queanbeyan, but he did not re-contest in 1869. In 1872 he was appointed to the New South Wales Legislative Council. Around this time he also acquired property in Queensland, all of which he lost in the 1890s depression. His daughter Nina married William Farrer in 1882 and they lived at Lambrigg, Tharwa, a property given them by De Salis. In 1893 he went to England in 1893, particularly to settle his affairs in Middlesex.

In 1898 he resigned from the Council and declared himself bankrupt with debts over £100,000. He died at Lambrigg on 20 November 1898 (aged 82).

New South Wales Legislative Assembly
Preceded by William Redman	Member for Queanbeyan; 1864–1869	Succeeded by William Forster
