= James Banford Thompson =

Irish-born Australian politician (1832–1901)

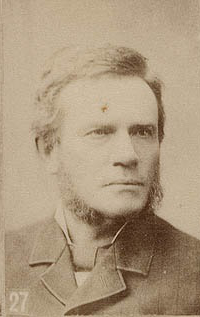

James Banford Thompson (1832 – 18 November 1901) was an Irish-born politician, surveyor and land valuer in New South Wales, Australia.

He was born in Fintona, County Tyrone, to postmaster William Thompson and Jane née Jeffries. His date of birth is uncertain: his parliamentary biography lists him as born in 1832, which would make him aged 68–69 at his death, while the notice of his death lists his age as 72, which would mean he was born in 1828 or 1829. His family migrated to Australia around 1836. He worked as a licensed surveyor, and on 11 February 1861 married Margaret Catherine Carroll; they would have twelve children. In 1877 he was elected to the New South Wales Legislative Assembly for Queanbeyan, serving until his resignation in 1881, to accept an appointment as a railway land valuer. He was made bankrupt in 1884.

Thompson died at Ryde in 1901.

New South Wales Legislative Assembly
| Preceded by John Wright | Member for Queanbeyan; 1877–1881 | Succeeded by Thomas Rutledge |
