= Granville Ryrie =

Australian politician

Major-General Sir Granville Ryrie KCMG CB VD
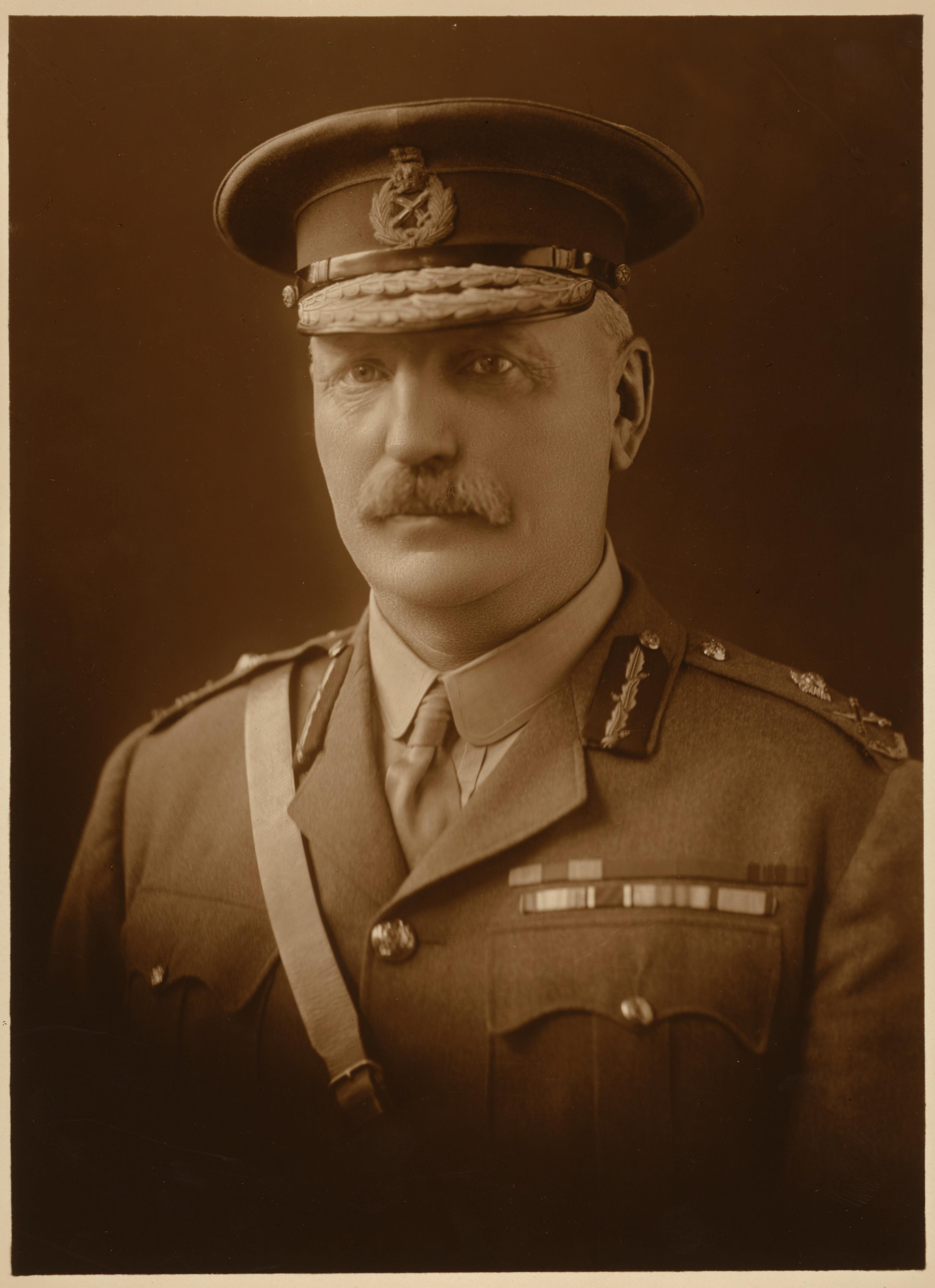
- Granville Ryrie in 1919

Australian High Commissioner to the United Kingdom
- In office 11 May 1927 – 10 May 1932
- Preceded by: Sir Joseph Cook
- Succeeded by: Stanley Bruce

Member of the Australian Parliament for Warringah
- In office 16 December 1922 – 13 April 1927
- Preceded by: Electorate established
- Succeeded by: Archdale Parkhill

Member of the Australian Parliament for North Sydney
- In office 11 March 1911 – 16 December 1922
- Preceded by: George Edwards
- Succeeded by: Billy Hughes

Member of the New South Wales Legislative Assembly for Queanbeyan
- In office 7 April 1906 – 26 February 1910
- Preceded by: Alan Millard
- Succeeded by: John Cusack

Personal details
- Born: 1 July 1865 Michelago, New South Wales
- Died: 2 October 1937 (aged 72) Camperdown, New South Wales
- Party: United Australia (1931–1937); Nationalist (1917–1931); Liberal (until 1917)
- Spouse: Mary Frances Gwendolyn McFarland (m. 1896)
- Children: 3
- Parent: Alexander Ryrie (father)
- Education: King's School, Parramatta

Military service
- Allegiance: Australia
- Branch/service: Australian Army
- Years of service: 1898–1927
- Rank: Major-General
- Commands: 1st Cavalry Division (1921–27); ANZAC Mounted Division (1918–19); 2nd Light Horse Brigade (1914–18)
- Battles/wars: Second Boer War; First World War; Gallipoli Campaign; Sinai and Palestine campaign; Third Battle of Gaza; Battle of Beersheba
- Awards: Knight Commander of the Order of St Michael and St George; Companion of the Order of the Bath; Volunteer Decoration; Mentioned in Despatches (5); Grand Officer of the Order of the Nile (Egypt)

Major-General Sir Granville de Laune Ryrie, KCMG, CB, VD (1 July 1865 – 2 October 1937) was an Australian soldier, politician, and diplomat. He served in the Boer War and the First World War, in the latter commanding the 2nd Light Horse Brigade (1914–1918) and ANZAC Mounted Division (1918–1919). His military career overlapped with his political career in the New South Wales Legislative Assembly (1906–1910) and Federal House of Representatives (1911–1927). He concluded his public service as High Commissioner to the United Kingdom (1927–1932), the first time the position had been held by someone other than a former prime minister.

== Early life ==
Ryrie was born at Micalago, Michelago, New South Wales on 1 July 1865, into a farming family. His father was Alexander Ryrie, a grazier and member of the New South Wales Legislative Assembly (1880–91) and of the Legislative Council (1892–1909), and his mother was Charlotte, née Faunce, both born in New South Wales. Granville was educated at Mittagong and at The King's School, Sydney; he later became a jackaroo, and eventually managed his own property. He was also a good heavyweight boxer. In 1896 he married Mary McFarland, whom Ryrie nicknamed "Mick". Mary McFarland was the daughter of Alfred McFarland (1824–1901), a judge in New South Wales.

Ryrie volunteered to serve in the Second Boer War, from 1899 to 1902. He was selected to serve in one of the Bushmen's Contingents, groups of light horsemen, because of his skills on horseback and in shooting. During the war he was promoted to the position of honorary major.

== Pre-war political career ==
In April 1906, Ryrie was elected to the New South Wales Legislative Assembly as member for Queanbeyan, where he served until 1910. He was an unsuccessful candidate for the Australian House of Representatives at the 1910 election, but was elected for North Sydney at a by-election on 11 March 1911, following the death of Hon. George Edwards.

== Military career ==
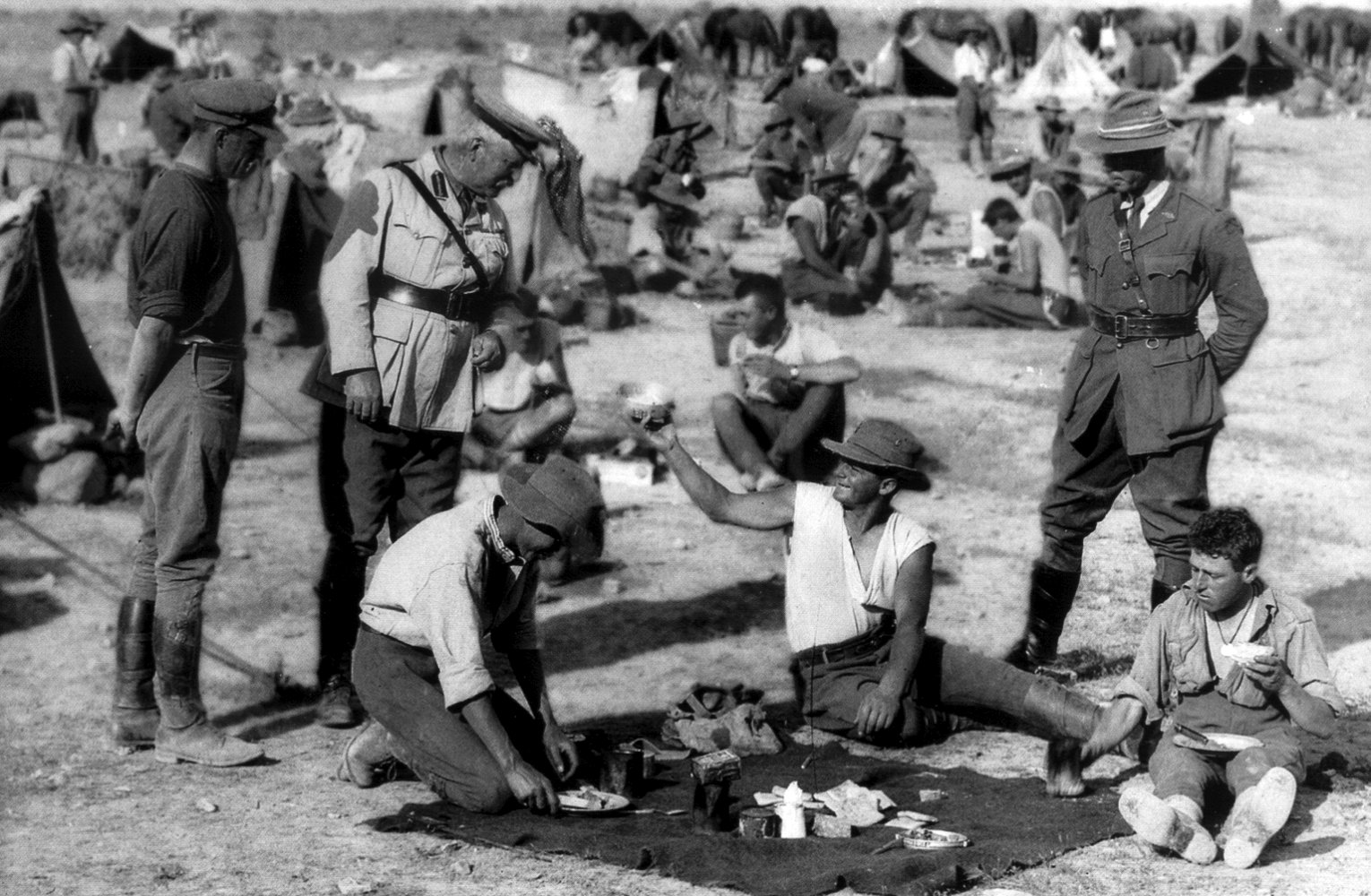
Ryrie conducting an informal inspection of Australian light horsemen on 9 April 1918, following the first Transjordan attack on Amman

At the beginning of the First World War, Ryrie was promoted to brigadier general, and was given command of the 2nd Light Horse Brigade, part of the ANZAC Mounted Division. He was in the Suez Canal area and then joined the Gallipoli Campaign on 19 May 1915, where he was wounded twice. He was later moved to Egypt and London for respite, but rejoined the Brigade for the Sinai and Palestine campaign. He was involved in the famous charge of the light horse in the Third Battle of Gaza, in which Australian forces captured the town of Beersheba. In December 1918 he was made commander of the ANZAC Mounted Division, and in April 1919 was put in charge of the Australian Imperial Force in Egypt. He was promoted major general in September.

== Post-war career ==
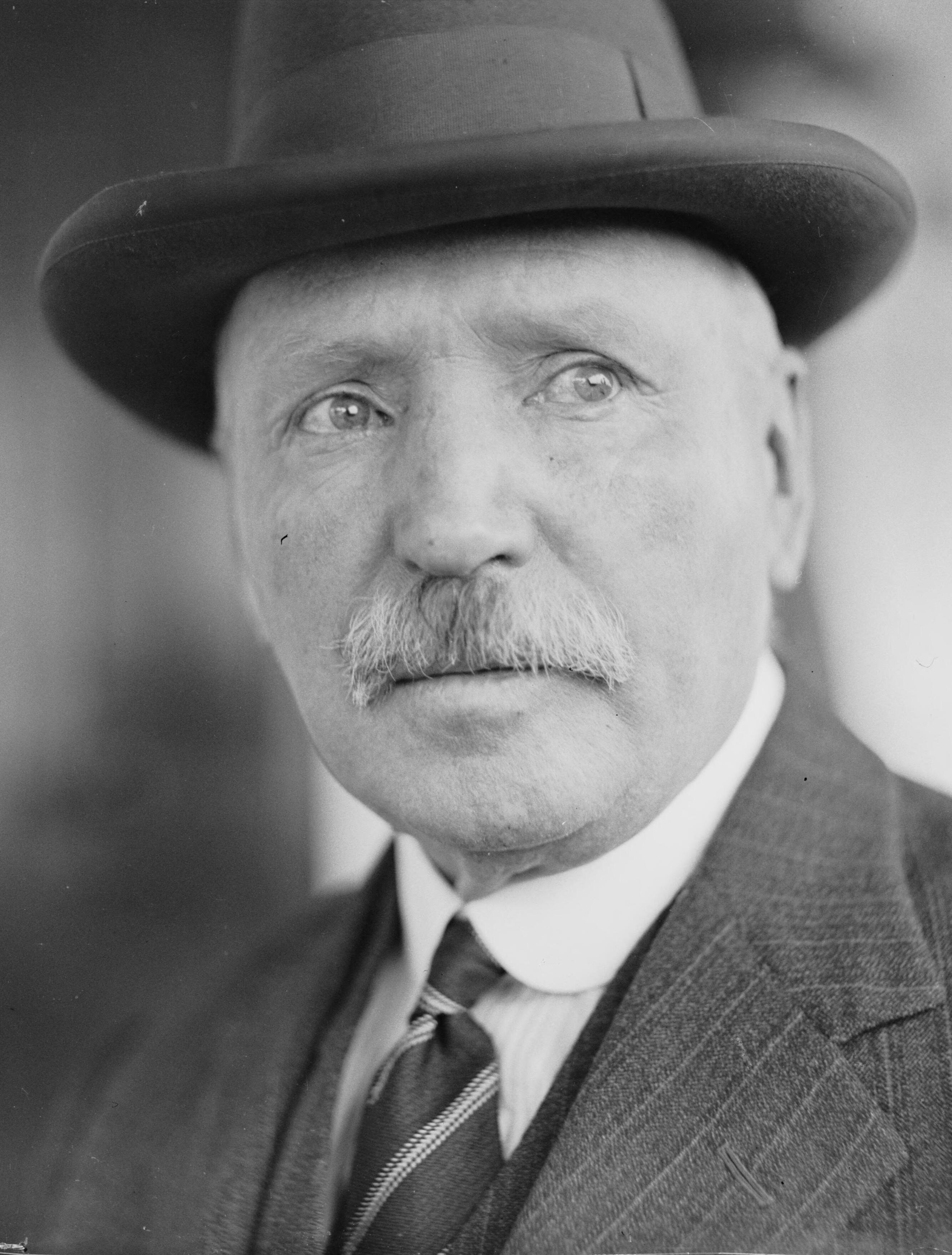
Ryrie in 1932

After returning to Australia, Ryrie remained the Member for North Sydney. In 1920, he was made an Assistant Minister for Defence in the ministry of Billy Hughes, assisting Senator George Pearce. At the 1922 election the newly created Division of Warringah was carved out of part of North Sydney, and Ryrie transferred there to be succeeded by Hughes. He served until 1927, when he was appointed the Australian High Commissioner to the United Kingdom in London. He was also an Australian delegate to the League of Nations. In 1928 and 1929 Ryrie acted as the Australian accredited representative before the League's Permanent Mandates Commission for the annual examinations of the Australian administration of the Mandated Territory of New Guinea.

Ryrie returned to Australia in 1932, and died in Sydney on 2 October 1937, survived by his wife and children. He was buried at Michelago, New South Wales, after a state service at St Andrew's Anglican Cathedral.

Micalago Station is still in the Ryrie family and is run by David Ryrie, Granville's eldest Ryrie grandson. David and his family still reside in the original homestead.

Ryrie Streets in Earlwood and North Ryde, Sydney are named in his honour.

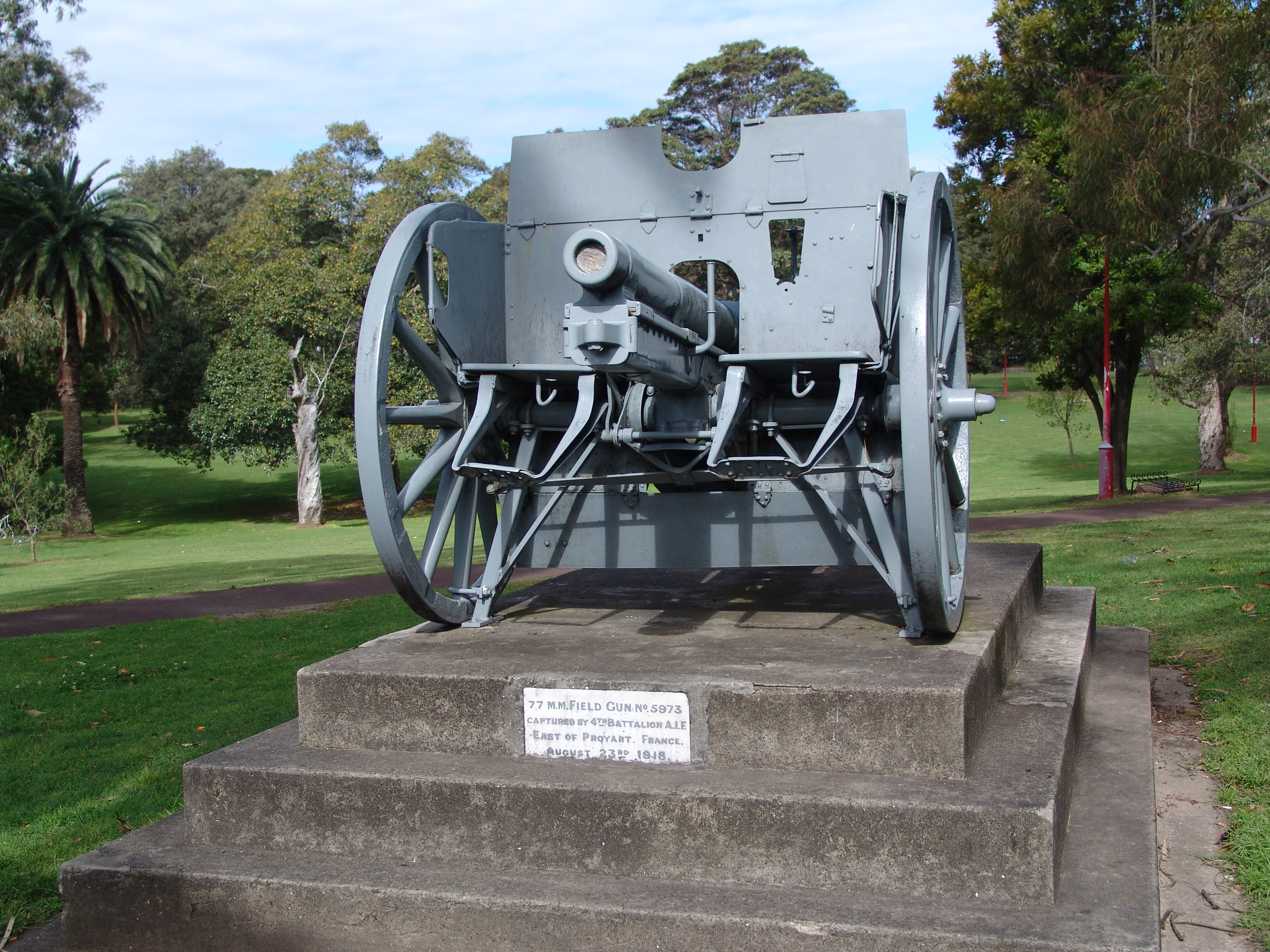
A WWI German Field Gun near North Sydney Oval. It was unveiled by Ryrie in 1921.

New South Wales Legislative Assembly
Preceded by Alan Major Millard	Member for Queanbeyan; 1906–1910	Succeeded by John Cusack
Parliament of Australia
Preceded by George Edwards	Member for North Sydney; 1911–1922	Succeeded by Billy Hughes
New division	Member for Warringah; 1922–1927	Succeeded by Archdale Parkhill
Diplomatic posts
Preceded by Sir Joseph Cook	Australian High Commissioner to the United Kingdom; 1927–1932	Succeeded by The Viscount Bruce
