= Egg decorating =

Type of ritual art

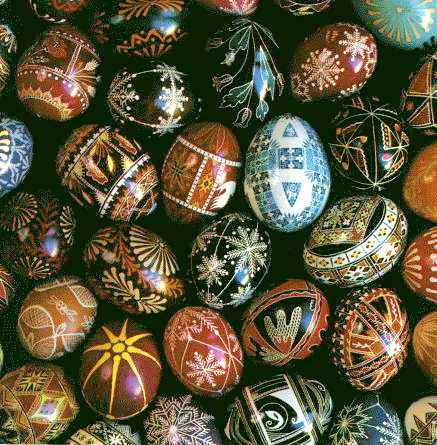
Ukrainian pysanka

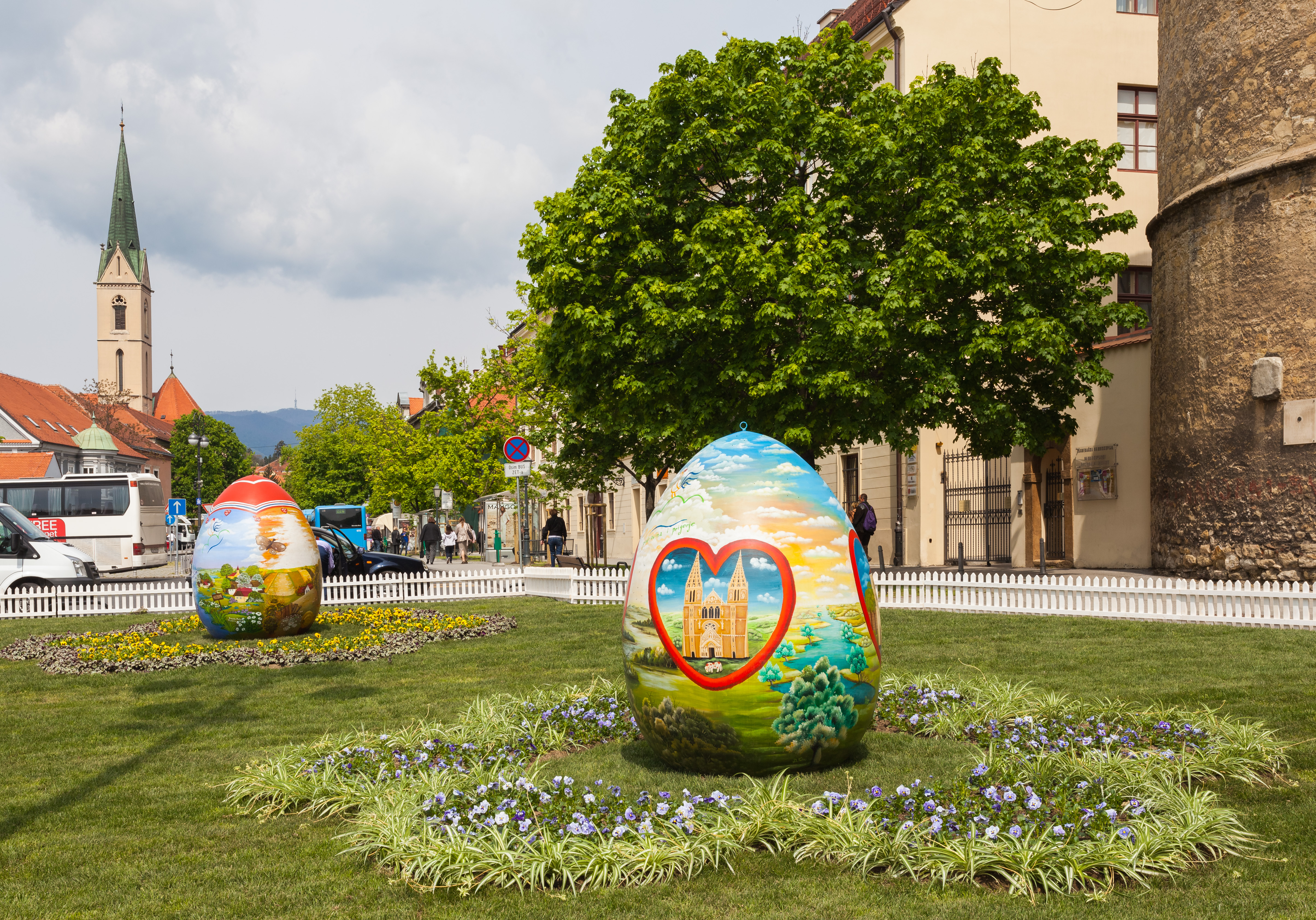
Easter egg sculptures resembling pisanica in front of the Zagreb Cathedral, Croatia

Egg decorating is the art or craft of decorating eggs. It has been a popular art form throughout history because of the attractive, smooth, oval shape of the egg, and the ancient associations with eggs as a religious and cultural symbol. Egg decorating has been associated with the Christian celebration of Easter (Pascha) in recent times, but was practiced independently by many ancient cultures.

== History ==
Eggs are an important symbol in folklore and mythology, often representing life and rebirth, healing and protection, and sometimes featuring in creation myths. This means that traditional egg decorating existed throughout the world.

=== Africa ===
The oldest eggshells, decorated with engraved hatched patterns, are dated for 60,000 years ago and were found at Diepkloof Rock Shelter in South Africa.

In Egypt, it is a tradition to decorate boiled eggs during Sham el-Nessim, a spring-ushering national holiday celebrated by Egyptians regardless of religion, which falls every year on the Monday following the Eastern Christian Easter.

=== Australia ===
In Australia, emu eggs are carved and the art created by them is known as kalti paarti carving. The art (which dates to the nineteenth century) is practised by people of different cultures, but it is associated most strongly with Aboriginal art.

Pictures are created by scratching, scraping and carving away the outer layers of the shell to reveal different shades of blue, blue-green, brown or grey.

=== Eurasia ===
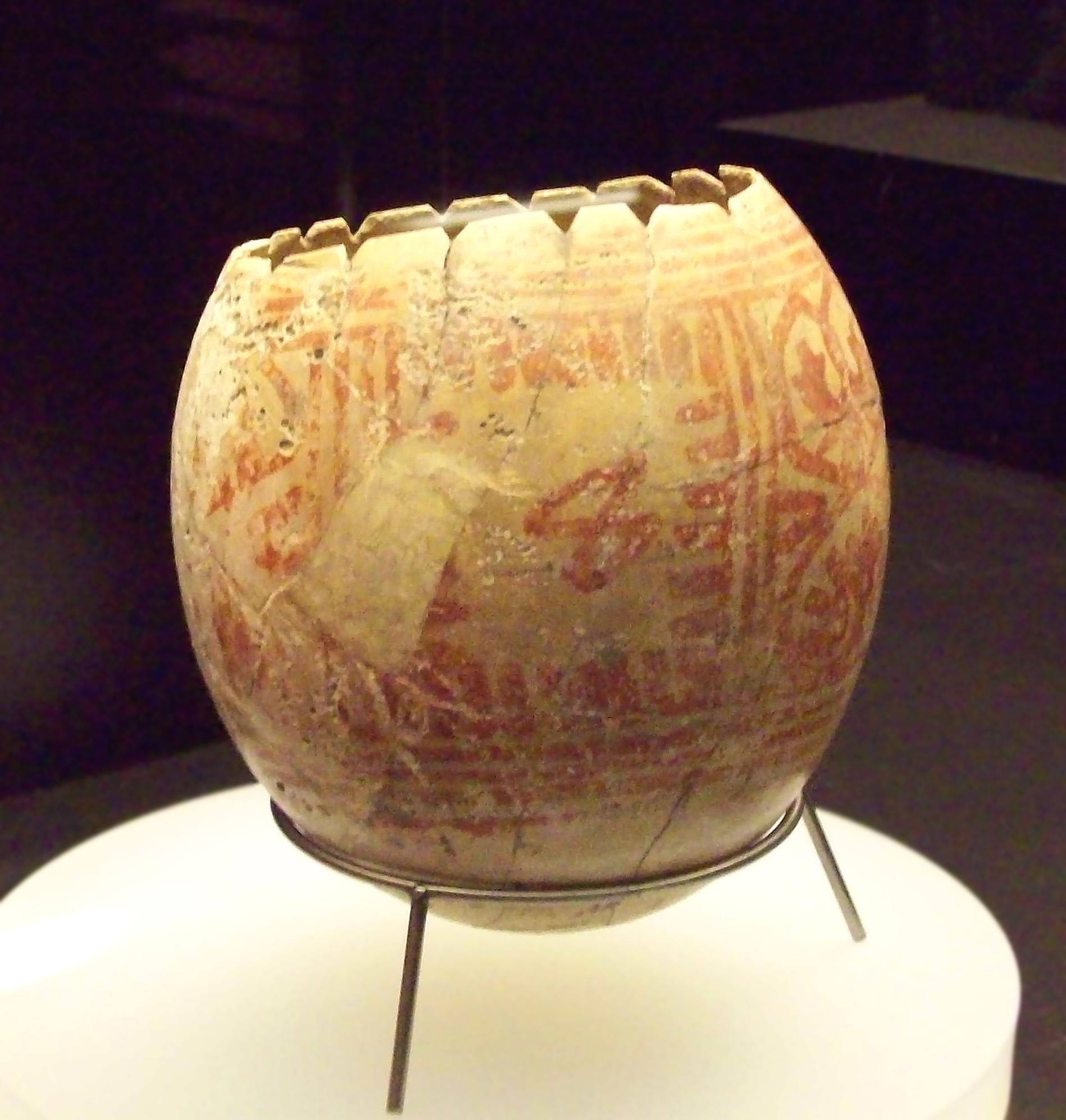
A Carthaginian decorated egg from the Iron Age

A Punic ostrich egg was found in Villaricos, Spain.

Orthodox Christians in Mesopotamia used red dyed eggs to symbolise the blood of Christ, which is a possible origin of the Easter egg. Red eggs feature in Greek Easter celebrations, where people play games which involve tapping the red eggs against each other.

Persian culture has a tradition of egg decorating, which takes place during the spring equinox. This time marks Nowruz, the Persian New Year. Family members decorate eggs together and place them in a bowl. It is said that it is from this cultural tradition that the Christian practice on Easter ultimately originates, having been transmitted via the Slavs.

Long ago Slavic and Iranic peoples formed a close continuum sharing many traditions and innovations in religion and language and in the first millennium many formerly Iranic peoples would eventually become Turkic or Slavic in identity. The tradition of Nowruz, which has its roots in at least ancient Zoroastrian tradition, is practised by Persian and Turkic peoples of various faiths, albeit the tradition of egg decorating may be even older than the holiday as known modernly.

Eastern European, Central European and North Asian cultures, have a strong tradition of decorating eggs dating back at least to times when paganism was the predominant religion. Chicken, duck and goose eggs are decorated variously with batik dyeing, applique, scratch-work, wax encaustic and carving. Egg decorating is popular in these countries, such as in Ukraine, where as the eggs are called Pysanky, Poland and Romania.

In Romania in the region of Bucovina the art of painting eggs is especially important, with there even being museums to show off the elaborately painted egg designs.

The renowned Russian court artist and jeweller Peter Carl Fabergé made exquisitely decorated precious metal and gemstone eggs for the Romanovs. These Fabergé eggs resembled standard decorated eggs, but they were made from gold and precious stones. In addition to the Slavs, many Turkic peoples also maintain closely related traditions of egg dying, associated with the coming of Spring and the Persian New Year Nowruz.

In many parts of Europe, egg decorating took place before the widespread adoption of Christianity. It is unclear to what extent paganism and Christianity influenced the practice. The earliest example of egg decoration in Europe was a decorated egg found buried with a young girl in modern-day Worms, Germany, dating to the 5th century, when eggs were not yet associated with Easter.

In Northern England, the tradition of Pace Egging (derived from Latin pascha meaning 'Easter') involved boiling eggs in onion skins to dye their shells a golden colour, or alternatively covered in leaves or flowers inside an onion skin to leave a patterned imprint. The tradition is practiced on Easter but is thought to be pre-Christian in origin. Scandinavian traditions also involved boiling eggs with flowers inside onion skins to colour them.

Another type of egg decoration is the Hungarian practice of egg shoeing, which requires goose eggs and miniature horse-shoes, made of iron or lead. The current world record of egg shoeing is 1119 shoes on a single ostrich egg.

== Techniques and modern practices ==
Any bird egg can be facilitated in this process, but most often the larger and stronger the eggshell is, the more favoured it will be by decorators.

Goose, duck and hens' eggs are usually "blown" – a hole is made in each end and the contents are blown out. The egg is then either carved, dyed, painted, appliqued or otherwise decorated (using a number of different techniques). Egg decoration is particularly popular in Eastern European countries.

Some eggs, like emu or ostrich eggs, are so large and strong that the shells may be carved without breaking. Decorations on emu eggs take advantage of the contrast in colours between the dark green mottled outside of the shell and the shell-underlay.

Many modern egg artists decorate their "art eggs" by etching or carving, while others paint or cover their eggs with different materials, from paper and fabric to polymer clay and are often painted in bright, spring colours. Using eggs as a canvas has become so popular that special terms have developed with the art form. Egg artists also have their own guild, the International Egg Art Guild, which promotes the craft of egg artistry.

In the United States there are shows in many states where artists show their eggs and vendors of "egging" supplies can be found. Each year, the White House chooses a decorated egg from each state to display at easter.

== See also ==
- Cascarones, hollowed eggs filled with confetti, from Mexico
- Kalti paarti carving, method of decorating emu eggs in Australia
- Egg decorating in Slavic culture
  - Polish pisanka
  - Croatian pisanica
  - Ukrainian pysanka
  - Czech Kraslice
- Easter egg
- Washi egg, an egg decorated using washi paper
- Traditional games with decorated eggs
  - Egg rolling
  - Egg hunt
  - Egg tapping
