= Tilpa =

- Town
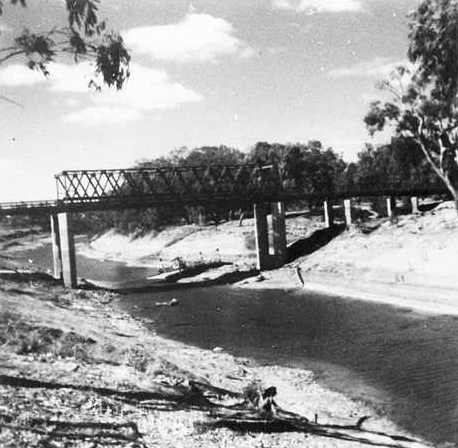
- The Darling River at Tilpa c. 1945. The punt can be seen behind the new bridge

- Coordinates: 30°56′11″S 144°25′0″E
- Country: Australia
- State: New South Wales
- LGA: Central Darling Shire
- Location: 917 km (570 mi) NW of Sydney; 340 km (210 mi) NE of Broken Hill; 181 km (112 mi) WNW of Cobar; 144 km (89 mi) NE of Wilcannia

Government
  - State electorate: Barwon
  - Federal division: Parkes
- Elevation: 88 m (289 ft)

Population
  - Total: 46 (2021 census)
- Postcode: 2840
Localities around Tilpa
Wanaaring	Wanaaring	Louth
White Cliffs	Tilpa	Kerrigundi
Wilcannia	Noona	Noona

Tilpa is a town in the Far West region of New South Wales, Australia. The town is located on the Darling River, in the Central Darling Shire local government area, 917 kilometres (570 mi) north west of the state capital, Sydney.

At the 2021 census, Tilpa and the large surrounding area had a population of 46. The town itself is said to have a population of nine.

The Darling River at Tilpa has erratic flows and is often dry in periods of drought. However floods in 1956 saw the Darling River span 80 kilometres (50 mi) at its widest, isolating Tilpa for five months.

== History ==
In its heyday, Tilpa was an important river port with paddle steamers delivering supplies to nearby sheep stations and returning down river laden with bales of wool. The wool was taken to Wentworth—at the confluence of the Darling and Murray Rivers—and then either to Adelaide or to Echuca for passage to the port at Melbourne. The town was home to a punt, allowing sheep, horses and people to cross the Darling River safely, for a fee.

In June 1886 Tilpa was described as "a small township on the Darling" with "a good store", a telegraph office and "a commodious hotel". The township was known as a crossing-place on the Darling River, on the route between the Paroo district and the Sydney market. A punt was owned and operated by a man called Williams, who charged 25 shillings per thousand for crossing sheep.

The punt has since been replaced by a bridge. The photo of the punt and the bridge dates it to after 1963 as that is when the bridge was completed.

== Culture ==
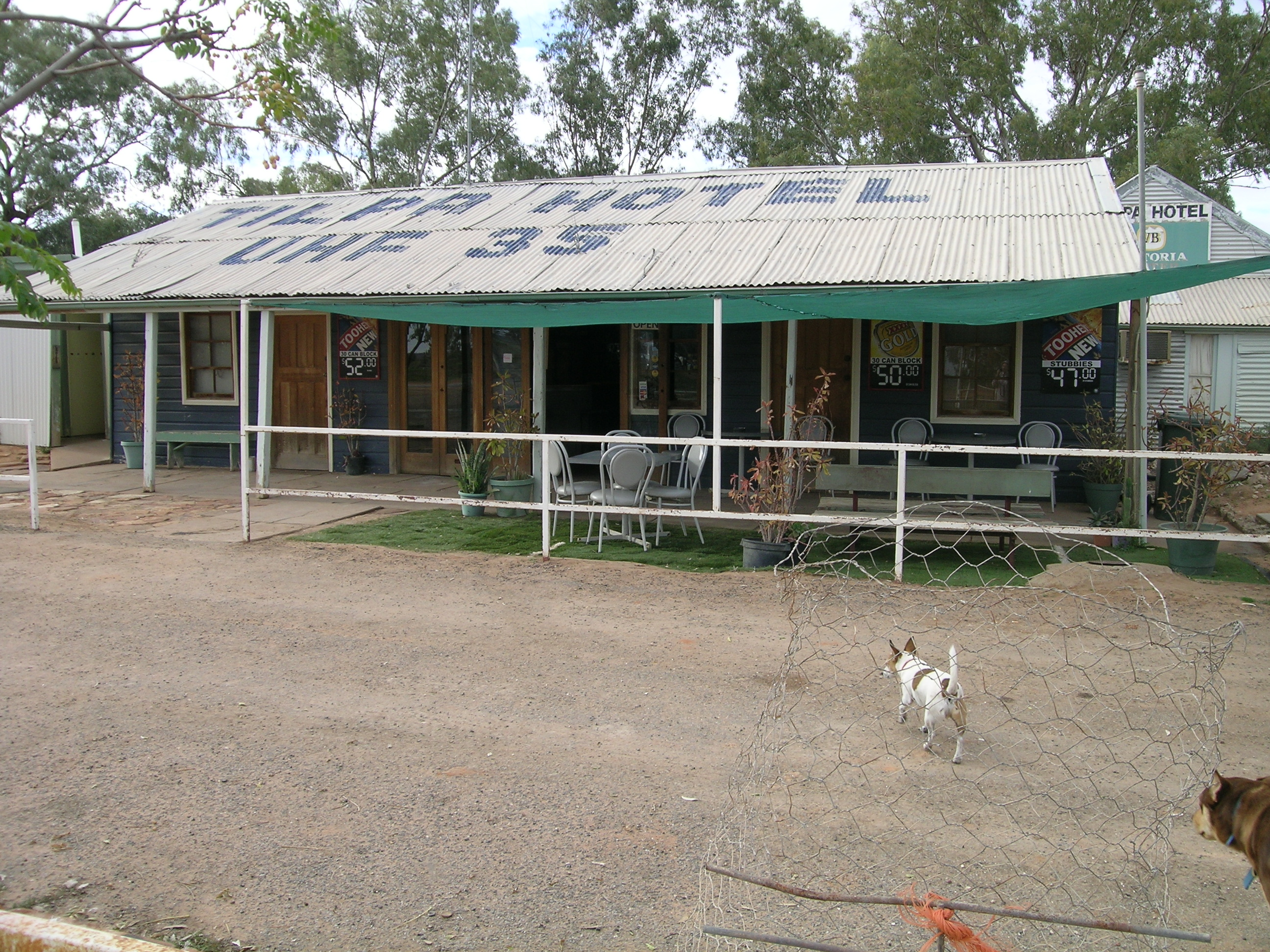
Tilpa Hotel

The local pub—the Tilpa Hotel—was built over 100 years ago. A timber and corrugated iron building, the inside walls are covered in messages and autographs placed by visitors in return for a donation to the Royal Flying Doctor Service. A feature of the town is a Boer War memorial in Australia that includes a commemorative to Harry "Breaker" Morant, who was controversially executed by the British Army for murdering Boer prisoners. The town also claims to have the smallest heritage trail in Australia (two signs across the street from each other) and the only cemetery in Australia with no interments.

== Economy ==
Tilpa is mainly an agricultural area, with sheep grazing the primary activity, and some pockets of irrigated land along the river. Tourism, including farmstay programs on local stations, is the other major local industry. Fishing and camping are popular along the river. The prolonged drought in 2007 saw Tilpa run out of potable water. A Sydney-based company has offered to trial a portable water filtration plant to improve the quality of both the river and bore water.

== See also ==
- Boolpoora Lake
