= Moysey =

Moysey may refer to:

- Moysey Fishbein (1946–2020), influential Ukrainian poet and translator of Jewish origin
- Moisey Kasyanik (also Moysey; 1911–1988), Soviet weightlifter
- Abel Moysey (1743–1831), English lawyer and politician
- Annie Moysey (1875–1976), Aboriginal matriarch
- Charles Moysey (1779–1859), Archdeacon of Bath from 1820 to 1839
- George Moysey (1874–1932), Australian sportsman who played Australian rules football and cricket
- Henry Luttrell Moysey (1849–1918), ninth Postmaster General of Ceylon and Director of Telegraphs

== See also ==
- Moisei Itkis
