= J. S. Reid =

Australian businessman

James Smith Reid (c. 1848 – 15 January 1922) generally referred to as "J. S. Reid" and familiarly as "Smith", was an Australian newspaper owner, editor and businessman.

== History ==
Reid was born in County Donegal, Ireland to Rev. James Reid MA (c. 1814 – 2 May 1866) and his wife Eliza Reid, née Smith (c. 1823 – 6 August 1900). Rev. Reid was a graduate of Glasgow University, a man of moderate means who fell on hard times.

Reid and his sister and two brothers arrived in Queensland with their parents aboard the barque Rockhampton in October 1863, his parents settling in Bowen, where his father was appointed their first Presbyterian minister, and the first minister of religion to settle in the town. He died of dysentery just three years later.

Rev. James Reid and Eliza Reid's children were:

- (James) Smith Reid (c. 1848 – )
- Marjorie Reid (c. 1850 – ) married one Johnstone. Barely mentioned in W.D.R.'s memoir.
- John Reid (c. 1852 – ), married Mary Louisa Fanny Clements of Rockhampton on 1 August 1879. Not mentioned in W.D.R.'s memoir.
- (William) Douglas Reid (c. 1853 – 9 September 1932) partner with Smith in most of his newspaper ventures; chairman of directors, BHP and Mount Lyall Mining Company. He died at Balcombe, Sussex.
- George MacFarlane Reid (c. 1855 – 21 November 1919) married Gertrude Macquisten in Scotland in 1891; he farmed at Reid's Garden on the Don River with his mother, traded in horses and cattle, gold miner, invested in BHP shares, retired wealthy to Prestwick, Scotland.

He served an apprenticeship as printer with F. T. Rayner of the Port Denison Times and began his journalistic career in October 1870 founding the Ravenswood Miner of Ravenswood, Queensland, site of North Queensland's first significant gold strike. The next venture was a newspaper in Gympie, then The Northern Miner in Millchester, close to Charters Towers. Other NQ strikes were at the Gilbert River, Etheridge, the Palmer River and the Hodgkinson, all within the space of eight years. Their third newspaper was the Cooktown Courier at Cooktown, where one of their staff was H. E. King. From Cooktown they went to the Hodgkinson field, founding the Hodgkinson Mining News which proved a disappointment.

In December 1880, making a break from goldfields, Reid founded the Western Grazier in Wilcannia then the bi-weekly Silver Age in Silverton, shortly moving it to Broken Hill. His press printed the first prospectus for the original Broken Hill Proprietary promoted by the "14 syndicate", and he is reputed to have had a hand in its authorship. Several brothers were involved with him in these enterprises, and became quite wealthy. He sold the Silver Age to E. Govett and W. J. P. Giddings

Reid was elected to Broken Hill Proprietary's board of directors in 1888, was involved in its splitting into the Block 10, Block 14 and British companies, resigned 1889.

He was instrumental in floating the Silverton Tramway Company in 1886. This was the first of many privately owned and run railway projects in which he had a major interest:

- Tarrawingee Flux and Tramway Company 1891 (which required an Act of Parliament) to carry high grade limestone to "The Barrier" for smelting purposes.
- Mount Lyell Mining and Railway Company, which built a line from the Mount Lyell mines to Waratah in 1893.
- Emu Bay Railway Company in Tasmania from 1897.
- With Charles William Chapman and William Knox, the Chillagoe Railway & Mining Co. that in 1897 built the railway from Chillagoe (site of a great copper deposit) to Mareeba and thence by public railway to Cairns. A spur line connected to the mine at Mount Garnet.

After the Mount Mulligan mine disaster, he retired from business, and died shortly after.

Reid's parents were buried in Bowen cemetery, their grave marked by a monument of Aberdeen granite.

=== "Rostrevor", Magill, South Australia ===
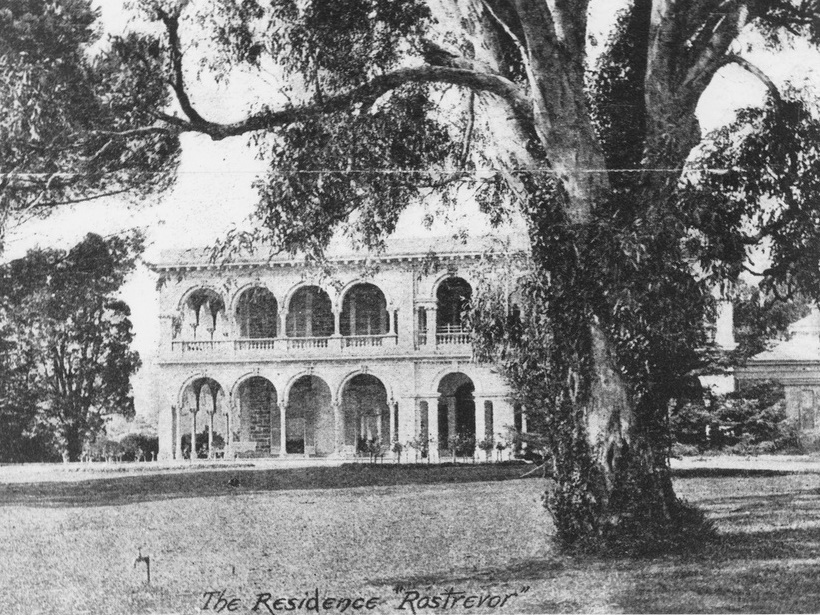
"Rostrevor" (original unrelated owner Ross T. Reid), home of J. S. Reid at Woodforde

Ross Thompson Reid (2 February 1832 – 10 January 1915), born in Newry, Ireland arrived in South Australia with his father John Reid in 1839. He was a successful pastoralist, owner of Tolarno and Tarcoon stations on the River Darling and built a mansion in Magill, South Australia which he named "Rostrevor" after a seaside resort in Ireland.

Some time around 1887 to 1889 ownership of Rostrevor passed from Ross T Reid to J. Smith Reid. No known family relationship. Smith Reid extensively renovated the house to resemble closely "Romdal" in Toorak, Victoria.

In 1913 Smith Reid donated 300 acres (120 ha), mostly consisting of the gorge and waterfalls, to the South Australian Government, and the Government purchased from him another 225 acres (91 ha) adjoining, and built access roads and an extension of the Magill tramway. A company "Rostrevor Estate Limited" was formed the same year to purchase from Reid another 633 acres (256 ha) for subdivision for housing, parks and gardens.

The house still stands, as centrepiece of Rostrevor College.

=== "Duneira", Mount Macedon, Victoria ===
"Duneira" was the property of Suetonius Henry Officer and his widow, then purchased by Edward Drewett Dyer (c. 1836 – 10 December 1889). Reid purchased the property around 1899 and had large sweeping lawns planted, watered by a spring.

Reid died there, and his widow, daughter Margery Smith Reid and son James Smith Reid (1900– ) continued to live at "Duneira". The house and land of 38 acres (15 ha) were sold by auction in December 1940.

== Family ==
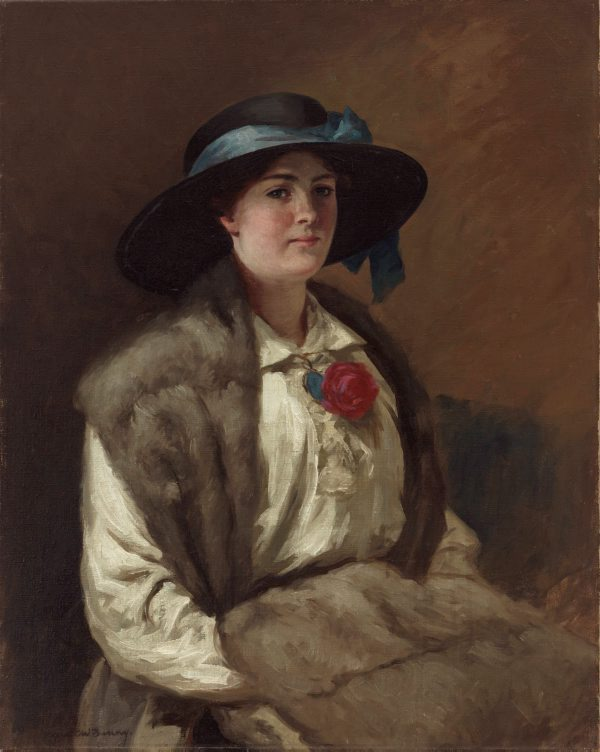
1913 portrait of Miss Hilary Mackinnon by Rupert Bunny

Reid married Martha Trumbull Ward ( – 31 March 1940) in Sandhurst (now Bendigo, Victoria) on 14 February 1883. She was the eldest daughter of Robert Trumbull Ward of Sandhurst and sister of the architect J. V. S. Ward.

- May Smith Reid (12 June 1887 – ) was born at "Woorigoleen", Toorak Victoria, married Gustave Leon Oscar Dewez ( – ) on 12 September 1911
- Margery Smith Reid (1888 – ) born in South Australia, with whom J. S. Reid corresponded.
- Julia Smith Reid (1889–1959) born in South Australia, married Dr. John William Grice ( – ) on 3 December 1919. He was the second son of Sir John Grice
- Mary Smith Reid (1891 – ) born in South Australia
- Youngest daughter Harriet Smith "Sonsie" Reid ( – 30 November 1924) never married.
- Only son James Smith Reid (1 August 1900 – ) born at Sorrento, Victoria, married Hilary Kinross Mackinnon on 21 April 1920

They had homes "Rostrevor", Magill, and "Duneira", Upper Macedon / Mount Macedon
