= Noona, New South Wales =

Rural locality in New South Wales

Noona
- Town
- Coordinates: 31°36′S 144°59′E
- Country: Australia
- State: New South Wales
- LGA: Cobar Shire
- Location: 790 km (490 mi) WNW of Sydney; 101 km (63 mi) W of Cobar; 160 km (99 mi) E of Wilcannia; 261 km (162 mi) SW of Bourke; 465 km (289 mi) NNW of Griffith

Government
  - State electorate: Barwon
  - Federal division: Parkes
- Elevation: 154 m (505 ft)

Population
  - Total: 21 (SAL 2021)
- Postcode: 2835
Localities around Noona
Tilpa	Tilpa	Kerrigundi
Wilcannia	Noona	Cubba
Bulla	Bulla	Sandy Creek

Noona is a rural locality within Cobar Shire, a local government area of New South Wales. It has a population of 21 people as of 2021.

== Geography ==
The topography is flat with a Köppen climate classification of BsK (Hot semi arid). The climate is characterised by hot summers and mild winters. The annual average rainfall is 350 mm, although this is highly variable. The record high temperature of 48.0 °C (118.4 °F) was registered on 26 January 2026 in Noona.
