= Ross T. Reid =

Australian settler pastoralist (1832–1915)

Ross Thompson Reid (2 February 1832 – 10 January 1915) was a pastoralist in South Australia and New South Wales. He is remembered in South Australia as the founder of Rostrevor Hall.

== History ==
Reid was born in Newry, County Down, Ireland, and emigrated to South Australia with his parents, John Reid (11 November 1795 – 12 October 1874) and Jane Reid (1795 – 26 March 1885; née Livingstone) who arrived in January 1839 aboard Orleana with their children and were the first settlers at Gawler:

- Eliza Sarah Reid (c. 1824 – 23 December 1914) married Dr. David Mahony ( – 5 February 1858) on 15 August 1849. He died in Gawler; she died at "Hurst", Sedlescombe, England.
- Samuel Reid (c. 1825 – 8 March 1859)
- William Livingstone Reid (c. 1828 – 16 July 1900) married Isabella Emily Colley (c. 1845 – 30 October 1932), second daughter of R. B. Colley, on 23 December 1865. Their daughter Isabella married a son of W. R. Wigley.
- John Reid (c. 1830 – 23 October 1916) in 1860 married Bertha Mitford (1837 – 15 April 1920), a daughter of Pasquin journalist Eustace Reveley Mitford. At different times he managed or owned the Beetaloo (east of Port Pirie) and Tintinallogy (between Menindee and Wilcannia) runs.
- Ross Thompson Reid (2 February 1832 – 10 January 1915) married Lucy Reynell (c. 1842 – c. 20 January 1921) on 12 February 1868
- Richard Jeb Brown Reid (c. 1834 – 26 July 1872) died at Booyoolee, buried at Bowmans head station

John Reid, as an early settler, took advantage of a short-lived regulation "The 'Modified Regulations for the Disposal of Land" which gave to every purchaser of a surveyed 4,000 acres (1,600 ha) property the option of making an additional selection of up to 15,000 acres (6,100 ha) in an area of the selector's choosing. Governor Grey, realising the propensity of this regulation to create monopolies, rescinded the regulation but was unable to cancel the 40-odd "Special Selections" which had already been approved. John Reid and partners, on the advice of William Light, recently turned land agent, selected a property at a junction of NorthPara and South Para rivers. They engaged surveyor William Jacob to lay out the township now known as Gawler and divided the rest among themselves. Reid's portion of 630 acres (250 ha), which he named "Clonlea", was on the north side of the North Para.

John Reid failed as an agriculturist: labour costs brought about by the gold rush to Victoria and the copper mines in Burra and elsewhere, coupled with poor prices, stretched his finances to breaking point, and he sold the mortgage on the property to William Paxton (Australian businessman) the chemist of Hindley Street. Eventually Paxton resumed the property, leaving the homestead and 40 acres (16 ha) for the Reids' use.

The children were brought up at "Clonlea", Gawler. Three of the brothers went in for pastoral property management: William took over Tolarno station on the Darling River, which he managed from the mid 1850s to the 1890s. Ross Reid and R. J. B. Reid initially had a share in the business; R. J. B. Reid left the partnership in 1868. Ross Reid was managing Mount Murchison station until at least 1866, then it was taken over by Dean & Laughton, and Ross joined William at Tolarno until 1867.

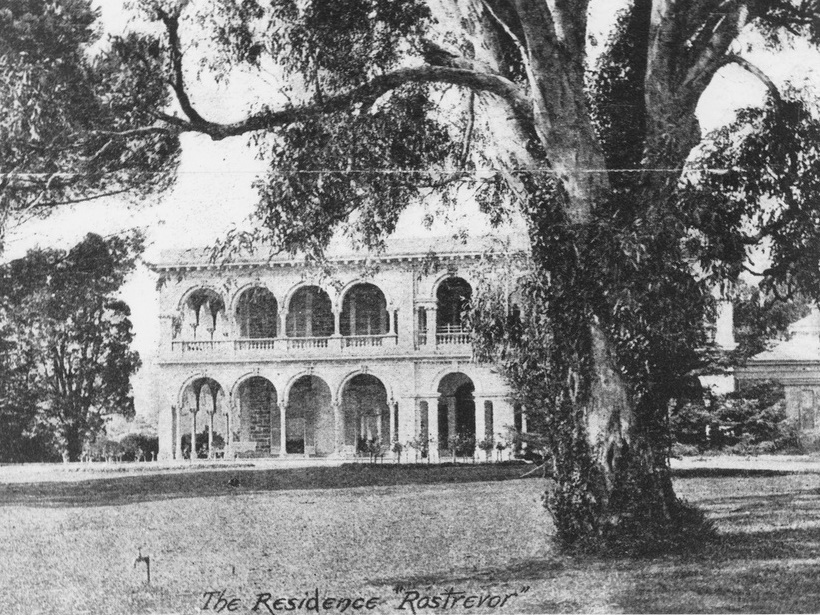
Reid's mansion "Rostrevor" after renovation c. 1890 by (unrelated) J. S. Reid, to resemble "Romsdal" in Toorak, Victoria.

Ross was a keen racegoer and owned several winning horses, notably Pride of the Hills. He purchased a large block at Magill, in the foothills of Adelaide, and there built a fine mansion which he named after Rostrevor, a seaside resort close to his birthplace.

By 1861, the Reid brothers had moved into the Bourke area and were in possession of West Bogan runs 20, 21, 22 (Tarcoon) and 30 (Mooculta). Mooculta was sold to Russell Barton in 1868 and it remained in his possession until 1912. Ross T. Reid lived on nearby Tarcoon Station from around 1868 (his first child was born that year in Bourke) until 1872, when it was sold to F. H. Randell. Tolarno station was one of the largest and most successful sheep stations on the Darling, shearing up to 250,000 sheep a year. While Tolarno was in the hands of the Reid brothers the only practical freight communication was by steamboat on the Murray-Darling system to ports such as Echuca, Mannum and Goolwa. In 1875, the Reid brothers and Hugh King purchased the Jane Eliza from captains Davies and Dorward, and also had an interest in steamers Gem, Jupiter, Menindie and Shannon. Thousands of tonnes of wool were shipped and the Reid brothers made a fortune.

Tolarno was in the 1880s badly infested with rabbits and was used as a test bed for Dr. Butcher's experiments with "Tintinallogy disease", which proved to be a false hope. In 1887 he put "Rostrevor" on the market; it was purchased by Melbourne businessman J. S. Reid (no relation). A prolonged drought hit the country in the 1890s, with a considerable loss of stock. Several banks failed and a country-wide recession hit Australia, with consequent loss of sales and low prices. He retired to Glenelg, South Australia, where in his home, "St Leonards", he died, aged 82, and was buried in the family vault, Magill.

== Family ==
At O'Halloran Hill, South Australia, on 12 February 1868 Ross Thompson Reid ( – 10 January 1915) married Lucy Reynell (c. 1842 – c. 20 January 1921), eldest daughter of John Reynell (1809 – 15 June 1873) and Mary Reynell, née Lucas (c. 1805 – 18 November 1867). John arrived aboard Surrey in October 1838; Mary arrived aboard Orleana early in January 1839; they married on 31 January 1839. She was in England when husband died. Died in Adelaide but accorded a minimal death notice and no obituary.

- Lucy Livingstone Ross Reid (15 November 1868 - ) born Bourke, married Mr Scott lived in Natal, Sth Africa.
- Olive (29 January 1870 – 7 March 1945) born Tarcoon Station, married Edward Eversley Thomas (1861 – 29 March 1916) on 5 January 1899
- Mabel "Maisie" Ross (11 June 1871 – ) born at Tarcoon Station, married David Alexander Murray Brown (1871 – c. 1938) in Penang on 25 February 1901. He was General Manager, Pinang Gazette Press.
- Reynell Ross-Reid (9 August 1872 – 29 October 1946), born Ross Reynell Reid, married Hannah Daws (c. 1897 – 22 November 1931), lived in Leeton, New South Wales
- Lydia "Lily" Ross-Reid (23 September 1873 – ) married Dr. William Frank Driscoll ( – ) in Stockton, California on 2 November 1900
- Douglas Ross-Reid (5 December 1874 – 20 December 1939) married Eliza Jane Tremellen (21 May 1878 - 2 April 1959), lived in Underdale
- Hilda Ross-Reid (28 January 1876 – 1876 9 months old )
- Elliot Ross Reid (10 February 1877 – Died in infancy)
- Allan Ross-Reid (31 July 1878 – 1 April 1943) married Maude "Stevie" Stevenson (1884 - 14 February 1957) on 10 March 1910, lived in New South Wales
- Trevor Ross Reid (11 May 1880 – 11 February 1941 Hankow China)
- Eleanor Ross Reid (15 Mar 1881- 9 Jan 1919) married Major George "Boysie" Bayard Bray, Indian Army

His remains were interred it the family vault at Magill.

== Sources ==
"Rostrevor House". Campbelltown City Council.
