= Richard Bowen Colley =

Australian politician (1819–1875)

Richard Bowen Colley (13 December 1819 – 28 May 1875) was the first mayor of Glenelg, South Australia.

Colley was born in London and visited South Australia in the 1830s, then emigrated with his family on the Competitor, arriving in October 1847.

He lived for a time in North Adelaide, then moved to St. Leonards (now Glenelg North) some time before 1864, and was a regular worshipper at St. Peter's Church, Glenelg; his house was later bought by William Rounsevell, and it was there ("Tremere") that Lady Daly died.

He was a member of the Volunteer Reserve, serving as a Lieutenant under H. R. Wigley.

He was an agent for the European Life Assurance Society and Secretary of the Kadina and Wallaroo Railway Company.

He served a City Auditor, Government liquidator, Justice of the Peace, and Returning Officer for the Assembly seat of West Torrens.

He was for a time owner of Section 4014, Hundred of Onkaparinga, known as Gilleston, adjoining Balhannah, and later incorporated into that town.

He suffered ill health and with his wife returned to England on the Orient in 1876 in the hope of finding a cure, but died the following year at Park Place, Regent's Park, London.

== Recognition ==
- Colley Reserve, Glenelg, was named for him.
- A stained glass window in St. Peter's Cathedral, Adelaide was dedicated to his memory.

== Family ==
Richard B. Colley (1819–1875) married Isabella Daniels (1821 – 7 June 1897); their children included four daughters and four sons:

- Frances "Fanny" Elizabeth Colley ( – ) married Edmund MacKenzie Young (c. 1837 – 23 April 1897) on 10 October 1864. Edmund was SA manager of the National Bank of Australasia, later came into conflict with the law in the Mercadool land conspiracy case. He died from pneumonia; his wife was in London at the time, may have remained there. They had two sons and two daughters.
- Isabella Emily Colley (c. 1845 – 30 October 1932) married William Livingstone Reid (c. 1828 – 16 July 1900) on 23 December 1865. He was brother of Ross Thompson Reid and manager of Tolarno station, on the River Darling.

- Isabella Ellen Reid ( – ) married Henry Vandeleur Wigley (1865–1927) on 6 October 1894, divorced 1900. Henry was a son of W. R. Wigley.

- Katherine Edith Colley (c. 1845 – 26 September 1908) married (later Sir) Richard Chaffey Baker (22 June 1842 – 18 March 1911) on 23 December 1865. He was a son of the Hon. John Baker
- (Cavendish) Lister Colley (9 February 1851 – 14 April 1906) married Louisa Simms (c. 1857 – 24 April 1910) on 12 December 1883, lived at Clare. She was a daughter of William Knox Simms.

- K(nox) Lister Colley (1885 – 7 December 1934) married Madge Mary Stirling ( – ) on 28 January 1914. Madge was the elder daughter of Sir Lancelot Stirling. Knox was a Clare Valley vigneron and prominent member of the Adelaide Hunt Club.
- Nevil Lister Colley ( – 1954) married Victoria Mary "Queenie" Spence ( – ) on 19 February 1924
- Cavendish Lister "Pat" Colley (1898–1982) married Phyllis Gypsy Good (1899–1947) on 31 October 1923. He was a prominent equestrian; she was a granddaughter of merchant Thomas Good.

- Richard Nevill Colley (1853–1905)
- Reginald Beaumont Colley (28 April 1855 – 27 September 1897) married Isabella Jane Scott ( – 25 October 1941) on 10 January 1884
- Edward Mammatt Colley (28 October 1856 – 19 August 1887) married Marian Fisher Georgiana Morphett (1859 – 18 March 1931) on 8 April 1885. She was youngest daughter of Sir John Morphett. She married again, to Frederic G. Levi ( – ) on 9 November 1905
- Ada Ellen Colley (9 December 1858 – 17 November 1949) married Aretas William Charles Young (c. 1848 – 4 March 1933) on 28 February 1882. Aretas was a son of Sir Henry Edward Fox Young.

The noted Primitive Methodist Rev. William Colley (c. 1827 – 21 September 1871) was not a close relation.
