= Washi egg =

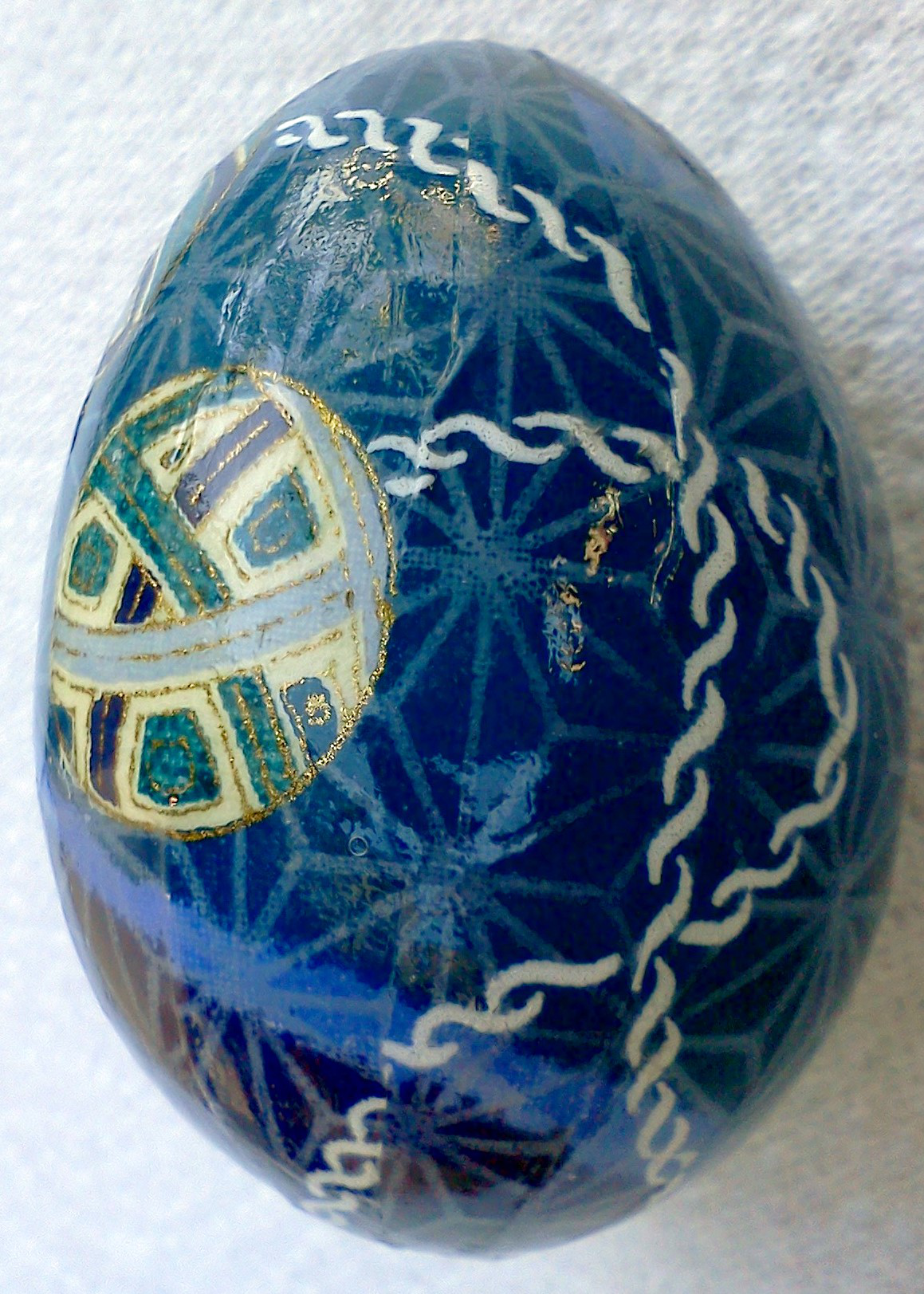
Washi Egg View 1

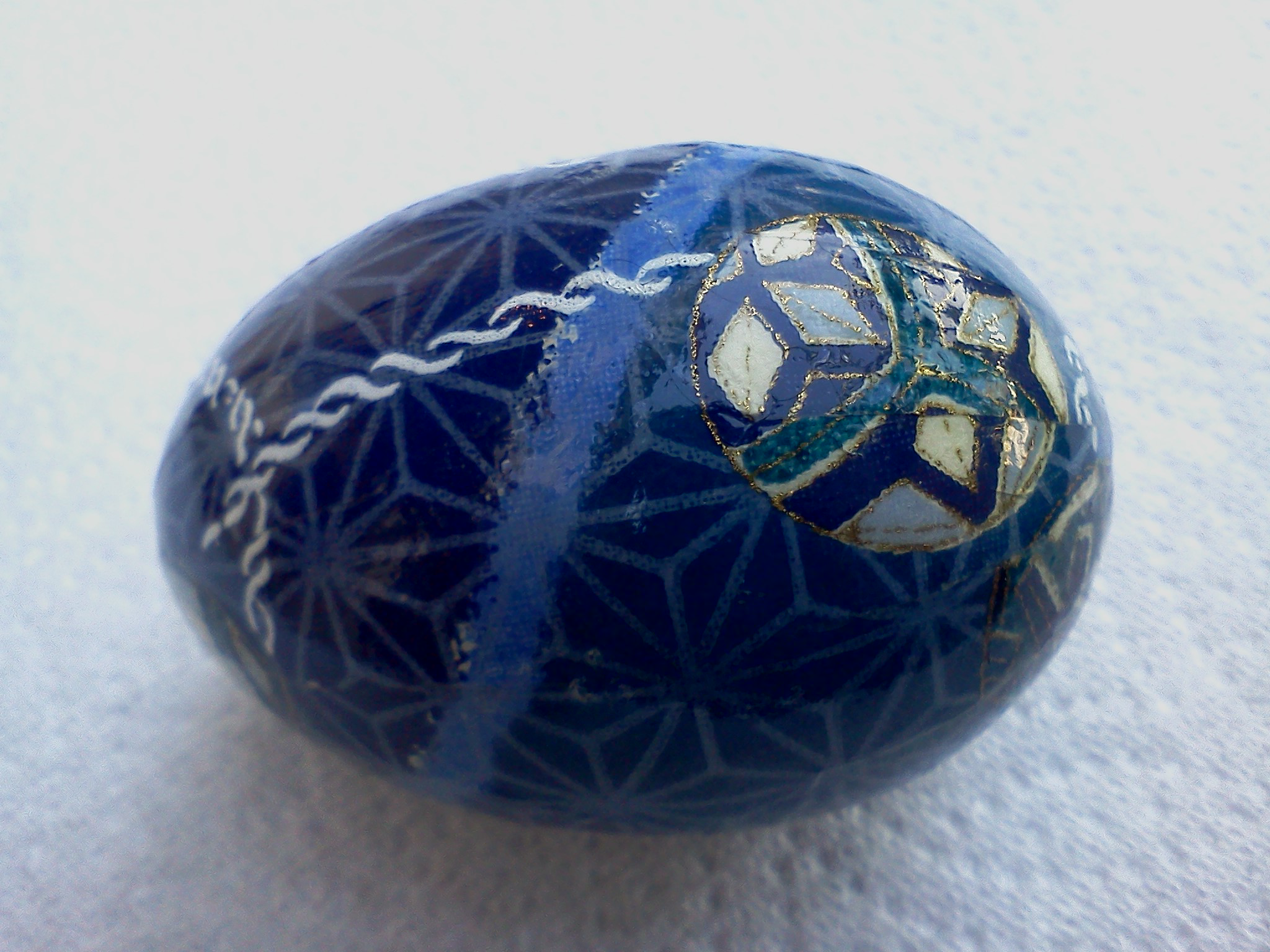
Washi Egg View 2

A washi egg is a decorated egg commonly created at Easter, using Japanese washi paper (as used for origami), glue, and varnish. Washi eggs are made into ornaments and decorations.

== Technique ==
A washi egg is made by first blowing the egg to remove its contents. A rectangle of washi paper large enough to cover the egg is folded in half, and cut nearly to the midline every quarter inch (6 mm) to form a fringe of narrow strips. Each strip is trimmed to a point. The paper is unfolded, rolled around the egg, and glued on, a strip at a time; the strips overlap at the ends of the egg. The egg may then be varnished.

Classes are given on US bases in Japan according to the Okinawan English language newspaper Japan Update.

== See also ==
- Easter egg
