= Port Denison Times =

Former weekly newspaper published in Bowen, Queensland, Australia

The Port Denison Times was a weekly newspaper published in Bowen, Queensland, Australia. It was also known as the Port Denison Times and Kennedy District Advertiser and the Port Denison Times and Bowen Advocate.

== History ==
The newspaper was first published in Bowen on 5 March 1864 until 25 August 1900 as the Port Denison Times and Kennedy District Advertiser. Port Denison was the port off the coast of Bowen. After amalgamation with the Bowen Advocate,1 September 1900 onwards, it was published as the Port Denison Times and Bowen Advocate. It ceased publication in 1910.

Frederick Thomas Rayner (c. 1835–1900) was the founder and first editor of the "Times", the first newspaper published in tropical Queensland, and for a time Australia's most northerly publication. It was at the Port Denison Times that James Smith Reid got his start in the newspaper business. Alexander Vindex Vennard who later wrote under the name of 'Bill Bowyang' undertook his apprenticeship with the paper before its demise.
