= Annie Moysey =

(1875–1976) Aboriginal matriarch

Annie "Grannie" Moysey (née Knight; 1875 - 2 February 1976) was an Aboriginal matriarch. She passed down the traditions of her tribal affiliation and was a revered figure among her people and in Wilcannia.

== Biography ==
Moysey was born north of Bourke on the banks of the Warrego River near Fords Bridge. She was of Gunu descent and raised by her grandmother who taught her to speak Gunu, Margany and Wangkumara. She also learned traditional lore as a child. Moysey worked along the Darling River, working at various stations, but most often at Old Toorale and also raised her own children, grandchildren and others. She taught her grandson and artist, William Badger Bates, how to carve in the kalti paarti style. During the 1920s, Moysey was forced to take the children she cared for to the Pooncarie Aboriginal Reserve, due to a work shortage. She stayed outside the reserve in a camp she set up herself and continued to work to care for the children. On 11 October 1930, she married Leonard Alfred Moysey in Wilcannia. The couple transferred briefly to Medindee Mission Station, but returned to Wilcannia in 1939.

Moysey was the last person living in her area who could perform the corroboree in the traditional way. She was known as Wilcannia's Grandmother and had a great deal of authority among her people. She kept the tribal laws and people believed that she had mekigar (or Barkindji witch doctor) knowledge. Moysey died on 2 February 1976, in the Wilcannia and District Hospital.
