= Alexander Vindex Vennard =

Australian writer

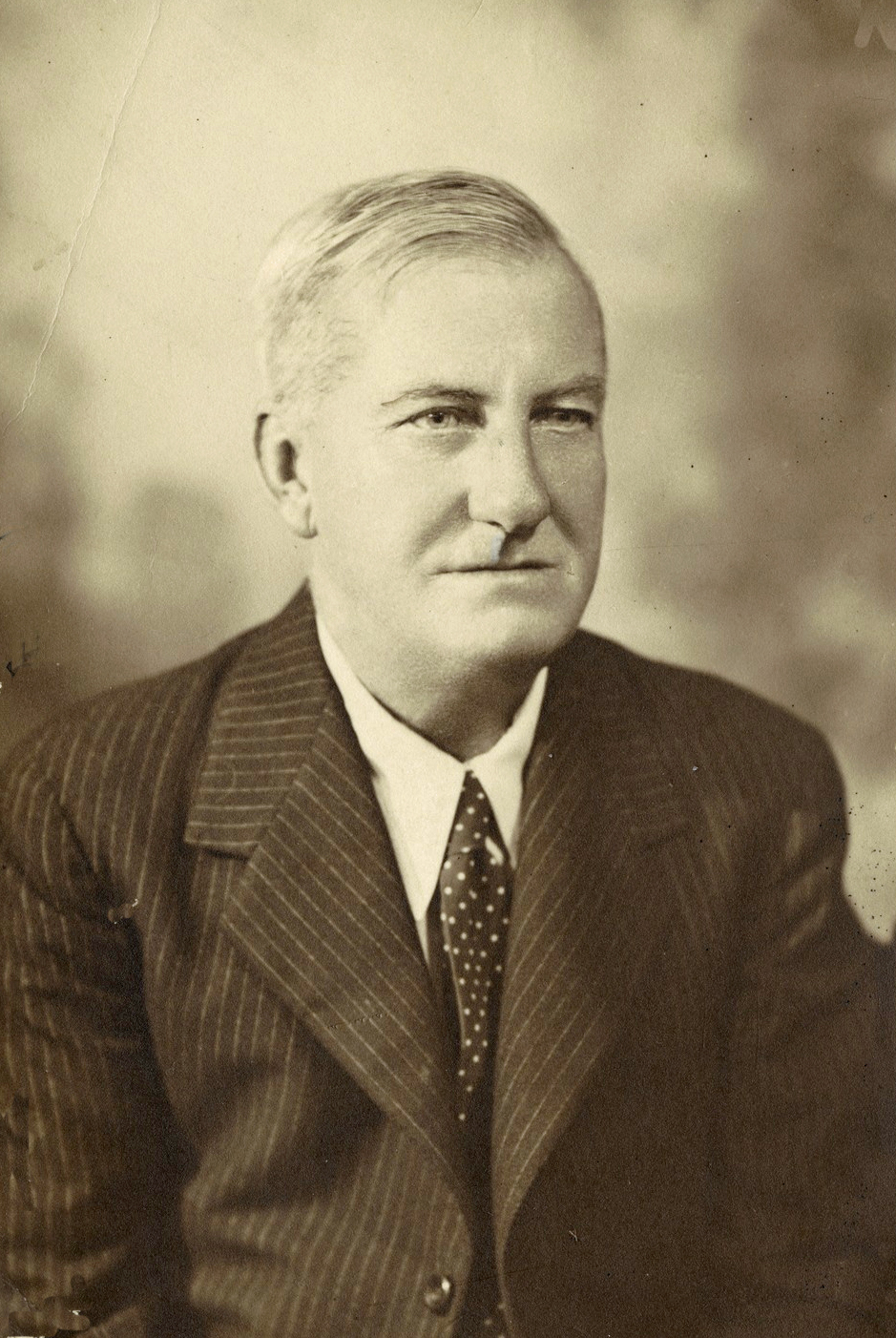
- Alexander Vindex Vennard
- Born: 11 July 1884; Winton, Queensland, Australia
- Died: 16 February 1947 (aged 62); Bowen, Queensland, Australia
- Occupations: Journalist, writer
- Spouse: Isabel Emily Nicol
- Children: 2 sons, 2 daughters
- Writing career
- Pen name: Bill Bowyang; Frank Reid; Maurice Deane
- Years active: –1947

Alexander Vindex Vennard (11 July 1884–16 February 1947), or 'Bowie', was an Australian writer known by several pen names, principally Bill Bowyang. The name bowyang referred to a piece of cord strapped below the knee of a wearer's trousers. He wrote of swagmen, bushmen, horsemen, and the digger. Vennard also collected and preserved bush ballads.

== Early life ==
With parents as drovers, Vennard was born on Vindex Station in the Winton district of western Queensland. His father Joseph Vennard emigrated from Derrykerrin, County Armagh, Ireland, arriving in 1882. His mother Janet Sutherland had arrived in Rockhampton from Scotland also in 1882, and the two were married at Rodney Downs property. Whilst his twin died, Alexander survived, and later had a sister Jane on 28 January 1886 (who later died in August 1889). Childhood life was spent at Blackbull, between Normanton and Croydon, before later becoming an apprentice at the Port Denison Times newspaper.

== Journalism ==
While a little mischievous, he was also known for his inquiring mind and flair for the news. After 1910 with the closure of the paper, and marrying in Proserpine, Vennard moved and became a reporter for the Sydney Morning Herald newspaper. Leaving his wife of a couple of years, he then became a swagman around Castlereagh, New South Wales, whilst still contributing newspaper articles. Part of this break was to be done with poet Henry Lawson, in 'Ogilvie country' heading towards Coonamble, New South Wales.

With the advent of World War I, Vennard enlisted in August 1914 at Coonamble, as Frank Reid, and served in the infantry in the Gallipoli campaign before transferring to the Imperial Camel Corps in Egypt. He also wrote of his impressions of Australian soldiers and their humour. While recuperating from wounds in the Camel Corps campaigns, writing as Frank Reid, he agreed to edit an Australian Imperial Forces paper leading to the creation of The Kia-Ora Coo-ee regimental newspaper. ('Kia-ora' being a Māori language phrase for 'good luck' and 'Coo-ee' being an Australian call or hail.)

Returning to Australia, he contributed short stories and general literary work for two years to Smith's Weekly, before going home to North Queensland. Here, as Bowyang, he contributed to the 'On the track' articles, and the later 'On the top rail' column, in the Townsville Bulletin and North Queensland Register. He would commonly write under one name, but refer to his articles written under another name.

Vennard, as Maurice Deane, also managed the 'Childrens Corner' newspaper column and the Golden Rule Club for the Bulletin and Register.

== Later life ==
Daughter Jean was married to Charles John Harding in 1931, given to be one of the largest weddings in Bowen at the time. His son Jim served in World War II becoming one of the Rats of Tobruk. His son Keith served in New Guinea. Daughter Yvonne had enlisted in the WAAAF and married John Irving Medland in 1943. Jean and Yvonne continued to live in Bowen.

A strong promoter of the town of Bowen and living at Sari Bair residence, Don Street, Vennard became seriously ill in his final months before dying in February 1947. He left his wife Isabel, his two sons and two daughters.

== Writings ==
Vennard's writings include:

- Toilers of the reefs (1922) as Frank Reid, published by Whitcombe and Tombs, dealing with the natural history of the Great Barrier Reef.
- 'Three Pearl Isle' (1931) as Frank Reid, a serial in the Townsville Daily Bulletin.
- The fighting cameliers (1933), about the history of the Imperial Camel Corps campaign between the Suez Canal and Gaza. Published by Angus & Robertson.
- Romance of the Great Barrier Reef, posthumously published in October 1947 by Angus & Robertson.
