= The Western Grazier =

Former newspaper in New South Wales, Australia

Front page of Western Grazier (Wilcannia, NSW) 1 January 1896

The Western Grazier was a newspaper published from 1880 until 1951, covering the central Darling River region of New South Wales. It was published in Wilcannia until 1940, when it moved to Broken Hill.

== Newspaper history ==
Wilcannia's first newspaper was the Wilcannia Times, a bi-weekly founded in 1873 by William Webb (March 1848 – 15 November 1910), and ceased publication in 1888.

The Western Grazier was established on 2 December 1880 by James Smith Reid. Reid was an Irish printer-journalist who had previously established several mining journals in Queensland, including The Miner in Charters Towers and Thornborough. After the establishment of The Western Grazier Reid went on to in Silverton, where he founded the bi-weekly Silver Age, whose printing presses were used to print the first prospectus of BHP. Reid and his brothers were to amass considerable wealth from their mining interests.

In 1886, Thomas William Heney became editor of The Western Grazier, a position he held for three years.

The first issue which is available to the public via Trove is dated Wednesday, 1 January 1896, is listed as Volume XVII No, 1571 and consisted of 4 pages, priced 3d., at which time the paper was published twice weekly; on Saturday and Wednesday by Albert John Esau (1863 – 24 December 1940).

Esau, son of Dr. Esau of Woodside, South Australia, purchased the Western Grazier around 1891 and until 1897 was solely responsible for the paper's production and distribution, then took on Thomas Henry Bell as assistant. It was in that year that Esau was successfully sued for libel. Esau subsequently was proprietor of the Armidale Chronicle, where in 1899 he attracted another libel suit, which was settled out of court. In 1905 he founded the Corowa Chronicle, which he ran for around 23 years, and was involved in many other regional newspapers. He later had a stationery shop in Singleton, New South Wales where he became insolvent in 1937. He died in Adelaide at the end of 1940 after being struck by a tram.

Thomas Henry Bell took over publication of the paper in October 1898, and ran it for 14 years, during which time it became a weekly, published on Saturday, with the price doubled to 6d. Bell was succeeded in 1900 by John Atkinson (ca.1857 – 16 February 1923), who had returned to Wilcannia in 1899 to take charge of the Lion Brewery, and was dubbed the "Pooh Bah of Wilcannia" for the way he entered into all facets of the town's life.

Editorship passed to longtime employee of the Western Grazier, Robert Varcoe "Bob" Patterson (ca.1863 – 2 October 1939) 1n 1909, but continued as proprietor until 1911, when ownership passed to Lewis Downs (ca.1860 – 8 February 1943), a businessman (partner in Knox & Downs) and accountant in Wilcannia. Patterson (who, unlike Esau, was constitutionally unable to say or write anything that might be hurtful to others) became proprietor a few years later. With the coming of railways and improved roads and motor vehicles, the Murray-Darling's importance as a conduit for wool and wheat, and Wilcannia's importance as a river port, declined dramatically and its population slumped. The Depression contributed to a drop in readership and nearly led to the paper's demise in 1933.

On Patterson's death, ownership of the Grazier passed to Michael Hayes (publisher) and G. Lawrence (financial backing). Their partnership was dissolved in October 1940, leaving Hayes the sole owner. Lawrence regained ownership in 1941 and arranged with Ernest Wetherell of Broken Hill's Barrier Daily Truth to take over the printing and distribution of Western Grazier, with J. Brand as the Wilcannia editor. Day of publication moved from Saturday to Friday; the cover price remained unchanged at 6d. With the war providing fresh headlines every day, and with most families personally involved, newspaper sales picked up dramatically. Post-war shortages combined with local factors to make the newspaper unprofitable and the newspaper ceased publication on 29 June 1951.

== Digitisation ==
Issues of the paper from 1 January 1896 have been digitised as part of the Australian Newspapers Digitisation Program project of the National Library of Australia.

== See also ==
- List of newspapers in Australia
- List of newspapers in New South Wales
