= Egg shoeing =

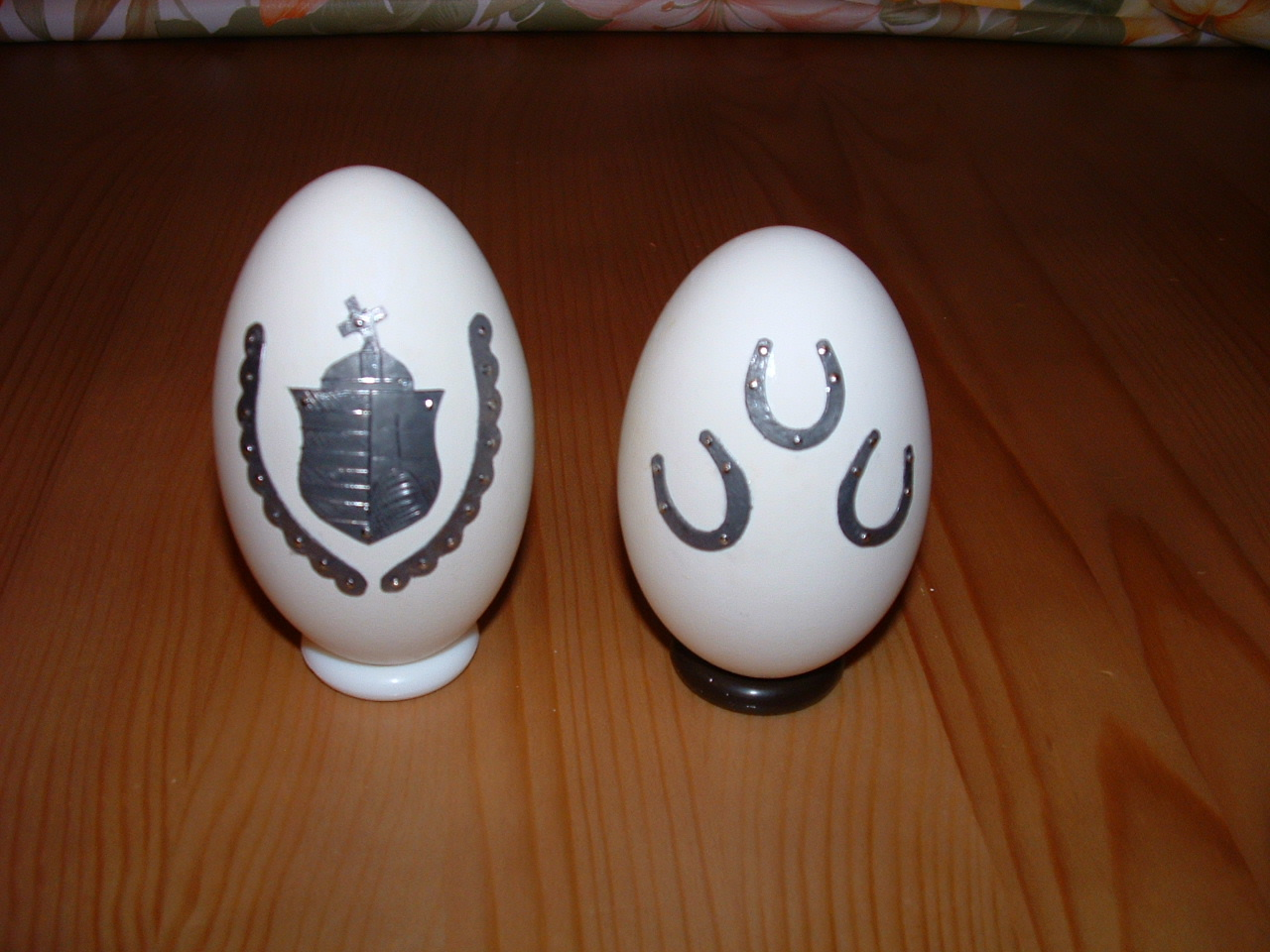
Two goose eggs with decorative shoes.

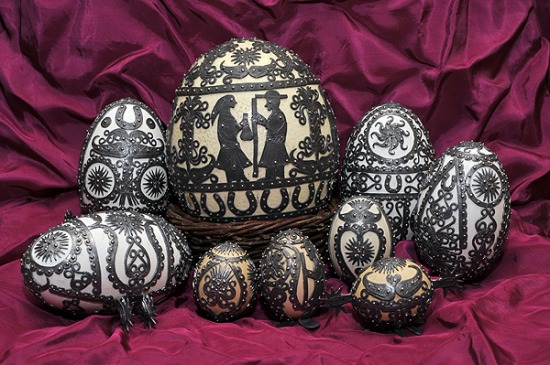
Above - ironed Easter eggs - work by László Bognár

Egg shoeing is an egg decorating technique. According to Hungarian oral traditions, egg shoeing was invented by village blacksmiths to prove their skills by creating an egg which was shod by miniature horseshoes. This technique is currently in decline due to the decreasing number of blacksmiths; it is mainly practiced in arts and crafts workshops, fairs and in the Szentendre open-air museum.

The current world record holder of egg shoeing is the Hungarian József Koszpek, who used 1119 pieces in decorating an ostrich egg. He also holds various related records: 34 pieces of iron on a shoed parrot egg, 146 pieces of iron on shoed chicken eggs, 35 pieces of iron on shod goose eggs, 598 pieces of iron on shoed emu eggs.

== Sources ==
- Home page of the world record holder in egg shoeing
