= Boolpoora Lake =

- Location within New South Wales
- Location: Far West, New South Wales
- Coordinates: 30°54′S 144°18′E
- Type: ephemeral lake

Boolpoora is an ephemeral lake bed located at 30° 54' 00" S, and 144° 18' 00"E, 54 miles south of Louth, New South Wales, and ten kilometers west of Tilpa, New South Wales. When full, the lake has an area of around 480 hectares.
