= Wilcannia Athenaeum =

Coordinates: 31°33′31″S 143°22′45″E

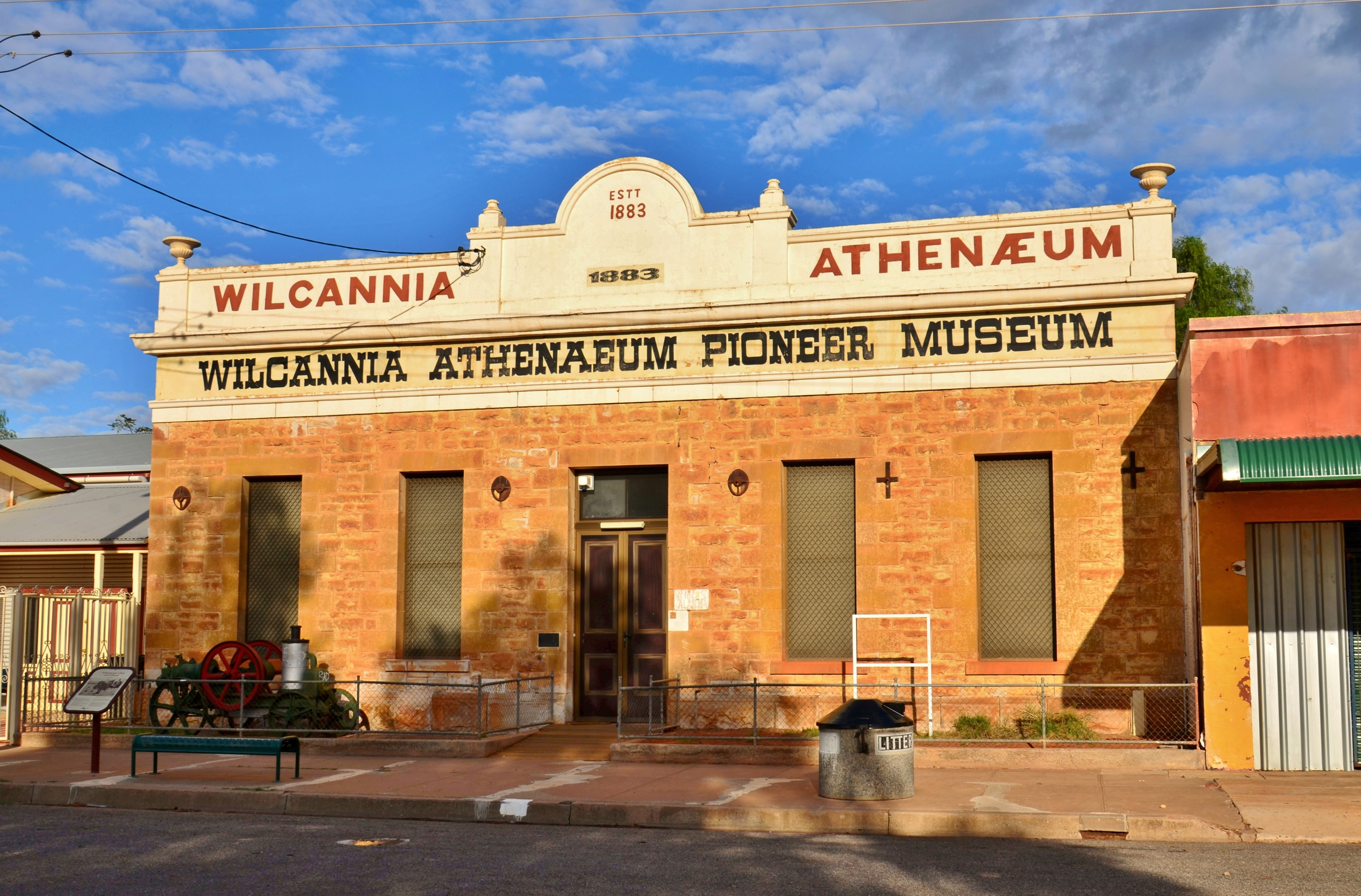
Wilcannia Athenaeum, 2017

The Wilcannia Athenaeum is a heritage listed, rusticated sandstone building in the town of Wilcannia, New South Wales. Built in 1883 and located at 37 Reid St, the Athenaeum was established to be an institution for community education, a school of arts (Note: Schools of Arts were known throughout much of Australia (apart from Queensland), as Mechanics' institutes. In Britain too, where they originated, most were called Mechanics' institutes. The names varied in many places, however. The founding institute of the movement, formed in 1821, was called the Edinburgh School of Arts. Some in New South Wales, especially Sydney, were called Schools of Arts. Melbourne Mechanics' Institution — and later, "Melbourne Mechanics' Institution and School of Arts" — lastly changed its name to the Melbourne Athenaeum in 1872.) and included a public library. It has served a number of functions including as a social centre, a library, a newspaper office, a municipal council meeting place, the Wilcannia Telecentre and is now a museum.

== Building ==
A sandstone single-storey building in Victorian Free Classical style with a parapet and central semi-circular entablature with urns, the style of the building reflects the aspirations of the residents of Wilcannia in an era when it was an administrative centre and the third largest inland river port in Australia.

The building is heritage listed.

== History ==
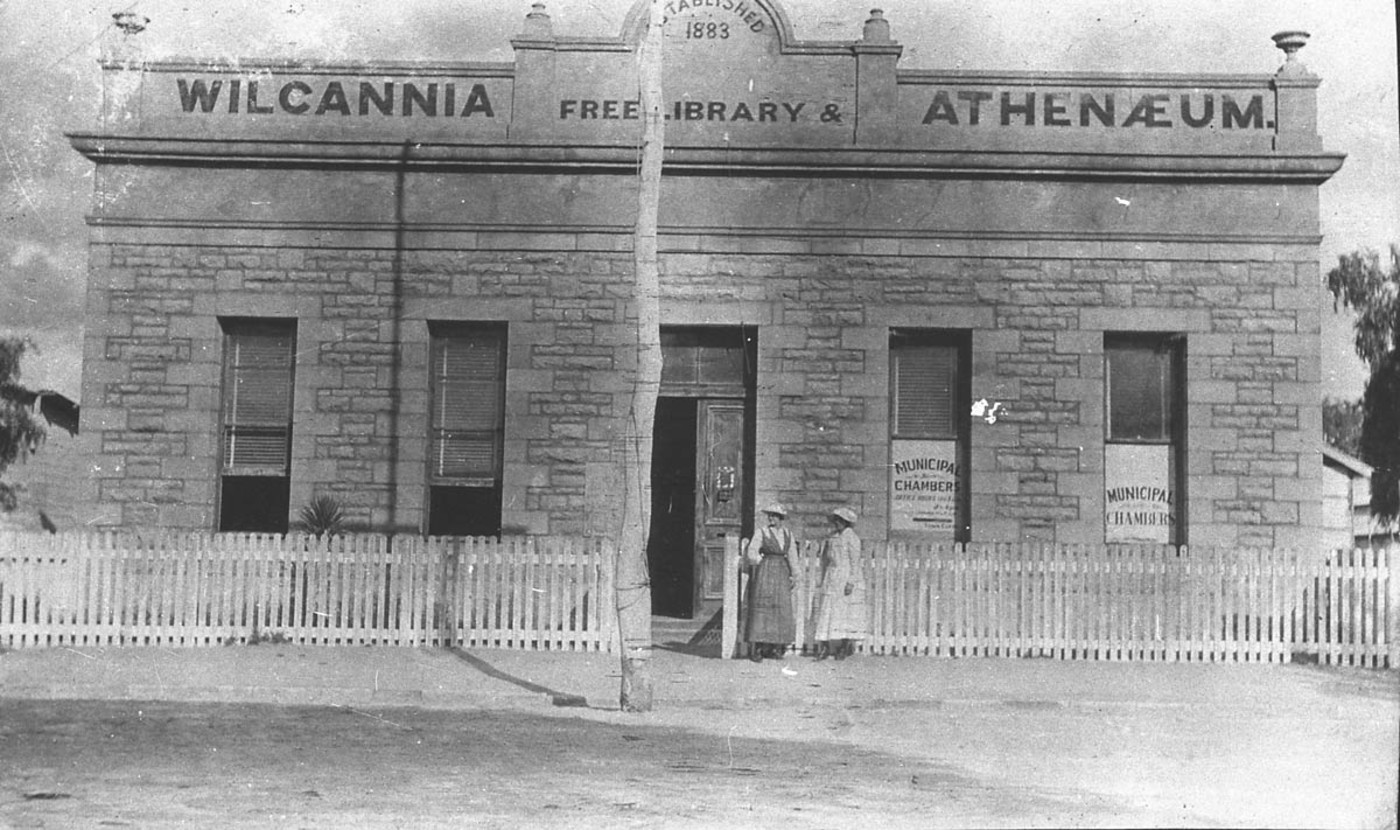
Wilcannia Athenaeum & Free Library, 1912

The original committee for the Athenaeum included Edward Bulwer Lytton ("Plorn") Dickens, the youngest son of Charles Dickens and Frederic Trollope, son of Anthony Trollope, who was responsible for ordering books for the town library. Walterus Brown, the editor of the short lived Wilcannia Times newspaper, published from 1874-1888, was a great supporter of the Athenaeum.

- 1882 - construction of the building was widely advertised with plans available in multiple locations and cities
- 1883 - Wilcannia Town Council was incorporated as a municipality in 1883 and in 1959 became the Central Darling Shire, council meetings were held in the Athenaeum building until 1972.
- 1896 - As well as the municipal council occupying space in the building it also operated the free public library, however a dispute arose between the Trustees and the council over the rent and the cost of operating the public library, with the council threatening to move to alternative premises
- 1898 - the librarians salary was reduced in an attempt to contain costs due to falling subscription revenue
- 1899 - the Athenaeum continued to struggle financially
- 1937 - the Council of the Municipality of Wilcannia was appointed the sole trustee of the land where the Anthenaeum stands.

In more recent times, the Athenaeum was the location for the Wilcannia Telecentre and currently operates as the Wilcannia Athenaeum Pioneer Museum.
