= Kalti paarti carving =

Art form made by carving an emu egg

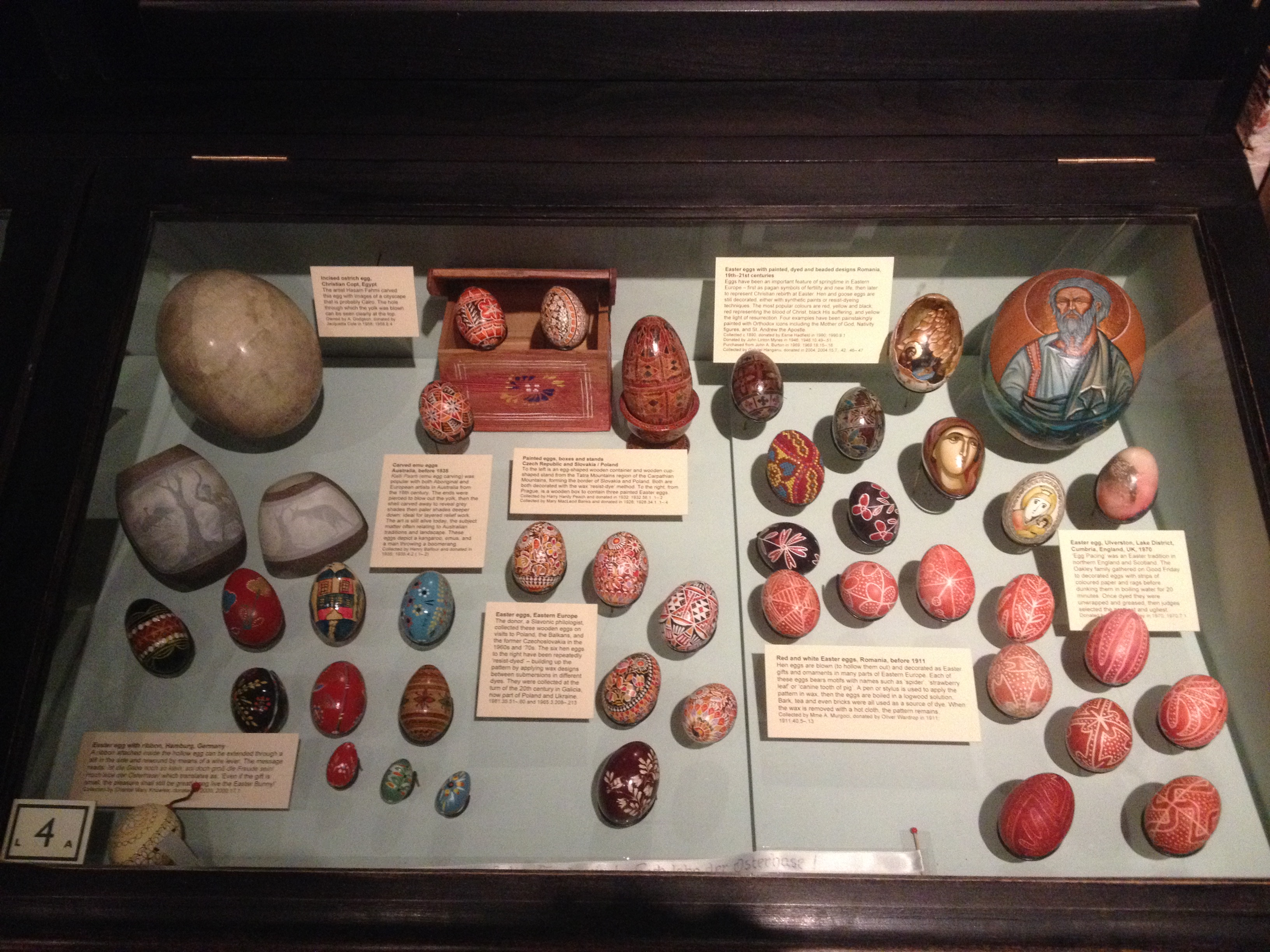
Kalti paarti visible in middle left (just below ostrich egg in top left)

Kalti paarti carving (also known as emu egg carving) is an art form made by carving a kalthi-parti, or emu egg. The practice began in the mid to late nineteenth century and while it has been practiced by people in Australia from many backgrounds, it is often strongly associated with Aboriginal art.

== History ==
The art of kalti paarti carving was popularized in the mid to late nineteenth century. Some of the earliest carvers were not strictly Aboriginal and these carvers created very decorative and complicated designs that were popular at the time. The art was continued by Aboriginal artists from south-east Australia and the Carnarvon region, especially after World War II. As Aboriginal people of Australia sought out a sense of identity, these artists became to use symbols based on traditional markings and designs. Artists like Bluey Roberts, Badger Bates and Adrian Morten created these types of designs. Esther Kirby and Barry Belotti went on to create realistic carvings that "critique colonial incursion."

Various designs of kalti paarti carving can indicate where the egg was carved. Silhouettes that create a visual narrative are more indicative of Paakantiji carvers while Wiradjuri artists more often create realistic images on one or two parts of the egg.

== Technique ==
Since 1983, the New South Wales National Parks and Wildlife Service has ordered that all emu eggs must come from farmed emus. Carvers who wish to collect eggs must have a license. Eggs are pierced at both ends and the shells are evacuated. The eggs are carved using various types of tools to create different effects. These can be sharp, like scalpels or knives, or abrasive, such as emery boards.
