= Wilcannia =

- Town
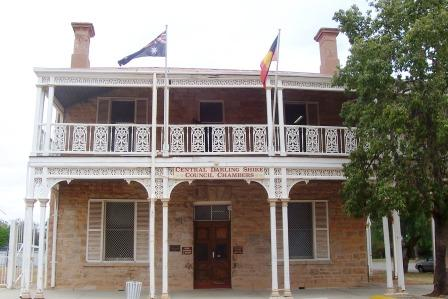
- Central Darling Council Chambers, 2005

- Coordinates: 31°33′25″S 143°22′45″E
- Country: Australia
- State: New South Wales
- LGA: Central Darling Shire
- Location: 958 km (595 mi) from Sydney; 196 km (122 mi) from Broken Hill; 261 km (162 mi) from Cobar; 335 km (208 mi) from Bourke
- Established: 1866

Government
  - State electorate: Barwon
  - Federal division: Parkes
- Elevation: 75.0 m (246.1 ft)

Population
  - Total: 735 (2021 census)
- Postcode: 2836
- County: Young County
- Mean max temp: 26.6 °C (79.9 °F)
- Mean min temp: 12.0 °C (53.6 °F)
- Annual rainfall: 263.9 mm (10.39 in)

Wilcannia is a small town located within the Central Darling Shire in north-western New South Wales, Australia. Located on the Darling River, the town was the third-largest inland port in the country during the river boat era of the mid-19th century. At the 2021 census, Wilcannia had a population of 735.

== History ==
=== Original inhabitants ===
The original inhabitants of the area are the Barkindji (or Paakantyi) people, indigenous Australians who have lived there for over 40,000 years, with some estimates extending up to 60,000 years. The Barkindji know the river as Barka (or Baaka), and their name translates literally as "people of the river". Their country stretches from Wilcannia downstream to the Avoca Homestead Complex near Wentworth, extending roughly 30 to 50 kilometres (19–31 mi) on either side of the Darling, and is estimated to cover an area about 19,000 square kilometres (7,300 sq mi).

Following the arrival of European settlers in the area in the 1850s, the Barkindji were increasingly restricted to Christian missions, or used as cheap labour on the sheep stations that quickly became the main industry. However, the remoteness of the area meant that the Barkindji were able to remain physically connected to their country.

=== European colonisation ===
In 1835, explorer Major Thomas Mitchell was the first European to reach the region, when he traced the Darling River to what is now Menindee.

In late January 1859, Captain Francis Cadell, in charge of the river boat Albury, entered the Darling River at its junction with the Murray and, after eight days travel, reached the Mount Murchison pastoral station, held by Hugh and Bushby Jamieson. Flour and other stores were delivered to the station and one hundred bales of wool were loaded for the return journey. Cadell's pioneering journey was the beginning of river boat transport on the Darling River (when river conditions allowed). The site of the future township developed as the location for the unloading and loading of river-borne cargo. The settlement was initially known as Mount Murchison, taking its name from the nearby pastoral run. As economic activity increased, the location attracted business and trades providing services and amenities to the surrounding stations.

In June 1866, the New South Wales Department of Lands formally declared "portions of Crown Lands" to be set apart as a site for the town of Wilcannia. Despite the official proclamation, the older name for the settlement persisted. In March 1867, a correspondent from the town wrote that: "the township of Mount Murchison is fast springing into importance, owing to the splendid country surrounding it, and which is fast being taken up for pastoral pursuits. We have public houses, stores, butchers' shops, boarding houses, a cordial manufactory in full operation, and a colonial ale brewery in course of erection".

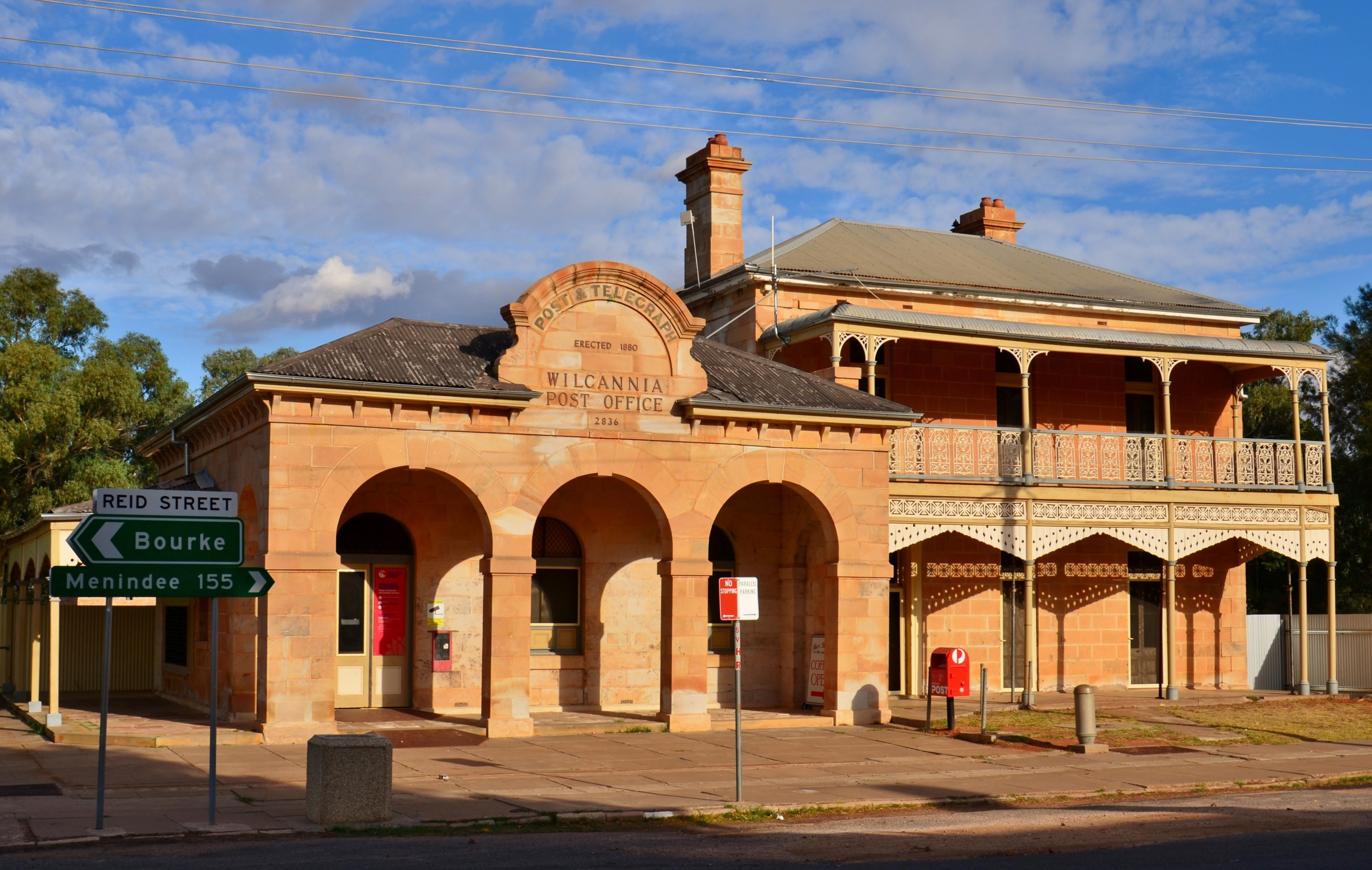
Wilcannia Post and Telegraph Office (built 1880), and adjoining residence

The Post Office had opened as Mount Murchison on 1 January 1860. It was moved 5 km to the town and changed name to Wilcannia on 1 June 1868. There was, however, no telegraph office - "the want of which is sorely felt by the business people of the town, and in fact the whole district". The Telegraph line reached Wilcannia on 2 February 1878 and was combined with the Post Office on 16 March 1878 in a temporary location. The "handsome building" shown here was constructed from freestone in 1880 and was occupied on 27 June.

In 1871, the population of Wilcannia was 264, consisting of 176 males and 88 females. In January 1874, the township's first newspaper, the Wilcannia Times, began publication.

An account of Wilcannia in December 1874 described the buildings in the town as "on the whole being of a very poor description, principally small weatherboard places, many of them looking rather dilapidated". Three stores were operating in the township, as well as three public houses: the Mount Murchison Hotel, Wilcannia Hotel and Britannia Hotel. There were signs of increased commercial activity in the township: two banks, the Australian Joint Stock Bank and the Commercial Bank, had recently opened branches, and four stock and station agents had started businesses "within the last three months". Wilcannia had a public school, but no churches. There were two doctors, "but as it is a very rare thing to find them otherwise than drunk, they are worse than useless".

Early on Wilcannia had a significant Chinese community. "The Chinamen here are doing a very thriving trade, and they are extending themselves gradually, but very surely. They are taking root very firmly, especíally in the baking and refreshment line, and they seem to be patronised by everybody here. We have a China doctor, who is a "perfect cure," so people say that know all about it. Nearly all the cooks at the hotels are restaurants are Chinese; all the gardeners are Chinese to a man. We have another institution added to us in the shape of a Chinese laundry. He, the laundry man, performs his work very well, and gets paid very handsomely for it.” This same report claimed the population of Wilcania at the time to be around 1,000 people with 70 of these being Chinese.

In December 1880, a second local newspaper, the Western Grazier, began publication in Wilcannia. By early 1881 patients were being treated in the newly built local hospital. At the census of 1881 the population of Wilcannia was recorded as 1,424 (976 males and 448 females). Wilcannia was incorporated as a municipality in February 1883, with Edmond O'Donnell elected its first mayor. The first major project of the municipality was the construction of water supply system for the township. A July 1884 report stated that Wilcannia had a population "of about 1200", and was described as a township "of well-laid-out streets and good buildings", situated "in the centre of a large sheep country". In addition to the well-constructed Post and Telegraph Office, several of the stores ("notably Frew, Wright, and Co., J. Palmer and Co., and Cramsie, Bowden, and Co.") were described as "not only extensive but of considerable architectural beauty". It was explained that a quarry of freestone "of excellent quality", within two miles (3 km) of the township "has been largely used for building purposes". The only local industry of note was a brewery.

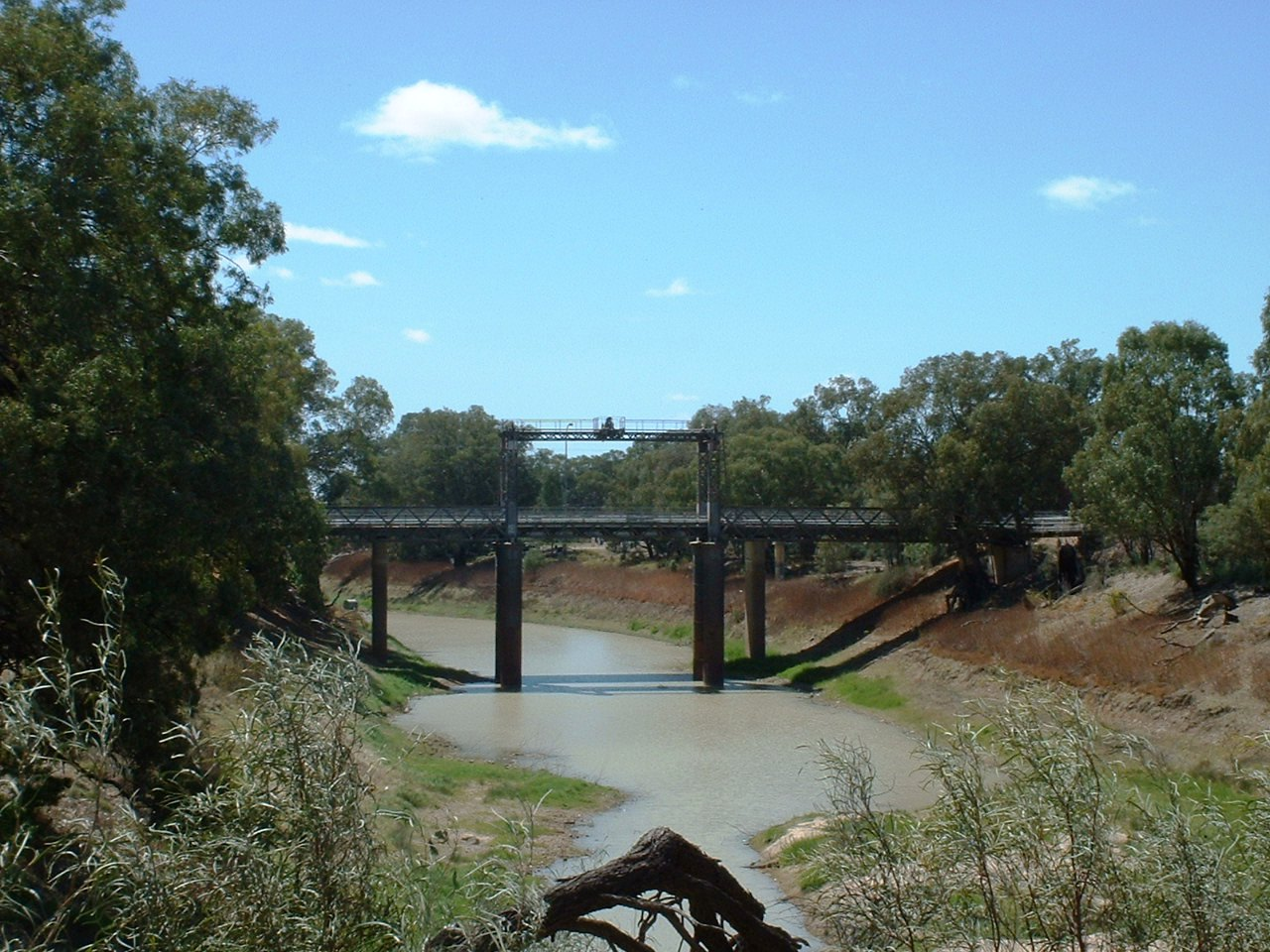
The bridge over the Darling River, opened 1896

Wilcannia was the location of a customs station on the Darling River. It was described as a "large and important centre of trade, where in 1881 £13,100 was collected as Customs revenue". The river trade during the 1880s was so extensive at Wilcannia that its Customs House was "probably the largest inland Customs Station in New South Wales".

When river conditions permitted travel by steamers Wilcannia was a major port on the Darling River. A visitor to the town described the river scene in 1890:

There are several wharves (so-called) which were merely graduated slopes cut out of the river bank, and in the wool season the river, in their vicinity, is thronged with steamers and barges, waiting for or unloading the season's clip, for the bulk of it goes away either to Bourke, for Sydney, or to Wentworth, or Goolwa. A barge, laden with from 1,200 to 2,000 bales of wool is a pretty sight; and a still more interesting spectacle is a string of 30 or 40 camels, each carrying two bales, proceeding into town from some far back station.

At the time of the 1891 census the municipality of Wilcannia had a non-Aboriginal population of 1,287 (775 males and 512 females). In 1907, the number of Aboriginal people living at Wilcannia was 18.

Vehicles and stock were crossed over the Darling River at Wilcannia by a punt operated by Charles Smith until the mid-1890s. In 1895 a bridge was constructed at Wilcannia and opened to traffic in January 1896. The bridge consisted of five spans, a total length of 310 feet (94.5 metres) with a centre lift span "to permit of steamers passing when the river is high".

In January 1917 it was reported that the Wilcannia Hospital was "without a doctor". The hospital was "full of patients, some diphtheria cases among them, and the Matron is having a very hard and anxious time".

In December 1939 Wilcannia was described as "merely a shopping centre for the wide district, although people travelling into Queensland and lonely sections of New South Wales often rest there".

== Geography ==
Wilcannia is located where the Barrier Highway crosses the Darling River, 965 kilometres (600 mi) from Sydney. The environment is borderline semi-arid to desert with an annual rainfall of 255 millimetres (10.0 in). Wilcannia is located within the Darling Riverine Plains Bioregion (IBRA classification, Department of Environment), consisting of landscapes adapted to flooding. Common species include river red gum, yellow box, oldman saltbush, and lignum.

The surrounding area is very sparsely settled by pastoralists who have large land holdings, used primarily to run sheep. These holdings fall in the Western Division and the majority are held as 99-year leases.

=== Climate ===
Wilcannia has a hot desert climate (BWh) under the Köppen climate classification, featuring long, very hot and dry summers and short, cool to mild winters. The annual average rainfall is 266.1 millimetres (10.5 in) which would make it a semi-arid climate except that its high evapotranspiration, or its barrenness, makes it a desert climate.

The highest temperature recorded in Wilcannia was 50.1 °C (122.2 °F) on 11 January 1939. This was during a severe statewide heatwave from which many towns still retain their highest temperature readings.

Climate data for Wilcannia (2000–2025 normals, extremes 1879–present)
Month	Jan	Feb	Mar	Apr	May	Jun	Jul	Aug	Sep	Oct	Nov	Dec	Year
Record high °C (°F)	50.1 (122.2)	48.3 (118.9)	44.4 (111.9)	39.2 (102.6)	33.3 (91.9)	30.0 (86.0)	31.7 (89.1)	33.3 (91.9)	40.5 (104.9)	42.5 (108.5)	46.0 (114.8)	46.8 (116.2)	50.1 (122.2)
Mean maximum °C (°F)	44.9 (112.8)	43.1 (109.6)	40.1 (104.2)	34.2 (93.6)	28.0 (82.4)	23.7 (74.7)	24.3 (75.7)	28.2 (82.8)	33.9 (93.0)	37.5 (99.5)	42.0 (107.6)	43.1 (109.6)	45.6 (114.1)
Mean daily maximum °C (°F)	37.1 (98.8)	35.5 (95.9)	31.8 (89.2)	27.0 (80.6)	21.3 (70.3)	17.8 (64.0)	17.7 (63.9)	20.2 (68.4)	24.6 (76.3)	28.3 (82.9)	31.8 (89.2)	34.8 (94.6)	27.3 (81.2)
Daily mean °C (°F)	29.2 (84.6)	27.8 (82.0)	24.2 (75.6)	19.5 (67.1)	14.3 (57.7)	11.5 (52.7)	10.9 (51.6)	12.6 (54.7)	16.4 (61.5)	20.1 (68.2)	23.9 (75.0)	26.8 (80.2)	19.8 (67.6)
Mean daily minimum °C (°F)	21.2 (70.2)	20.1 (68.2)	16.6 (61.9)	11.9 (53.4)	7.3 (45.1)	5.1 (41.2)	4.0 (39.2)	4.9 (40.8)	8.2 (46.8)	11.9 (53.4)	15.9 (60.6)	18.8 (65.8)	12.2 (53.9)
Mean minimum °C (°F)	14.1 (57.4)	13.0 (55.4)	9.2 (48.6)	5.3 (41.5)	1.5 (34.7)	−0.7 (30.7)	−1.7 (28.9)	−0.9 (30.4)	1.5 (34.7)	4.7 (40.5)	8.1 (46.6)	11.0 (51.8)	−2.2 (28.0)
Record low °C (°F)	8.1 (46.6)	7.2 (45.0)	5.0 (41.0)	−0.6 (30.9)	−4.4 (24.1)	−3.9 (25.0)	−6.1 (21.0)	−4.2 (24.4)	−1.7 (28.9)	1.7 (35.1)	3.9 (39.0)	7.8 (46.0)	−6.1 (21.0)
Average rainfall mm (inches)	26.7 (1.05)	28.8 (1.13)	30.9 (1.22)	20.5 (0.81)	23.5 (0.93)	27.8 (1.09)	19.3 (0.76)	14.1 (0.56)	19.6 (0.77)	28.6 (1.13)	25.3 (1.00)	17.6 (0.69)	282.7 (11.14)
Average rainy days (≥ 1 mm)	2.7	2.5	2.8	2	2.7	3.1	3	2.2	2.1	3	3.5	2.2	31.8
Average afternoon relative humidity (%) (at 3 pm)	21	26	27	30	39	48	46	35	29	24	23	20	31
Average dew point °C (°F)	7.2 (45.0)	9.4 (48.9)	7.4 (45.3)	6.2 (43.2)	5.5 (41.9)	5.5 (41.9)	4.2 (39.6)	2.4 (36.3)	2.9 (37.2)	2.2 (36.0)	5.0 (41.0)	4.9 (40.8)	5.2 (41.4)
Source: Bureau of Meteorology (Dew point for 3pm)

=== Significant weather ===
On 9 November 1950, a severe thunderstorm with damaging winds and large hail the size of cricket balls struck the town. Two people were injured, dozens of homes lost their roofs and nearly every house in town was damaged due to the large hail.

== Facilities ==
Wilcannia Central School includes a pre-school and caters for students up to Year 12 (with the last two years through distance education). At the 2020 ARIA Music Awards, Wilcannia Central School's Sarah Donnelley won Music Teacher of the Year.

Construction work began on the Baaka Cultural Centre in August 2023, on the main road through Wilcannia. Its shape resembles the foot of an emu, and it will function as a tourist centre as well as a gallery for local art and artefacts. Local people are being employed, as well as specialists in stonemasonry and rammed earth construction from South Australia and the NSW south coast. Baaka is the Paakantyi word for the Darling River.

The only local radio station is community radio station Wilcannia River Radio, broadcasting on 103.1 MHz, which has provided factual information and aired discussions about matters such as COVID-19, climate change, and other matters. Other radio stations include Outback Radio 2WEB on 99.9 MHz, ABC Radio National, and ABC Western Plains.

== Transport ==
=== Public transport ===
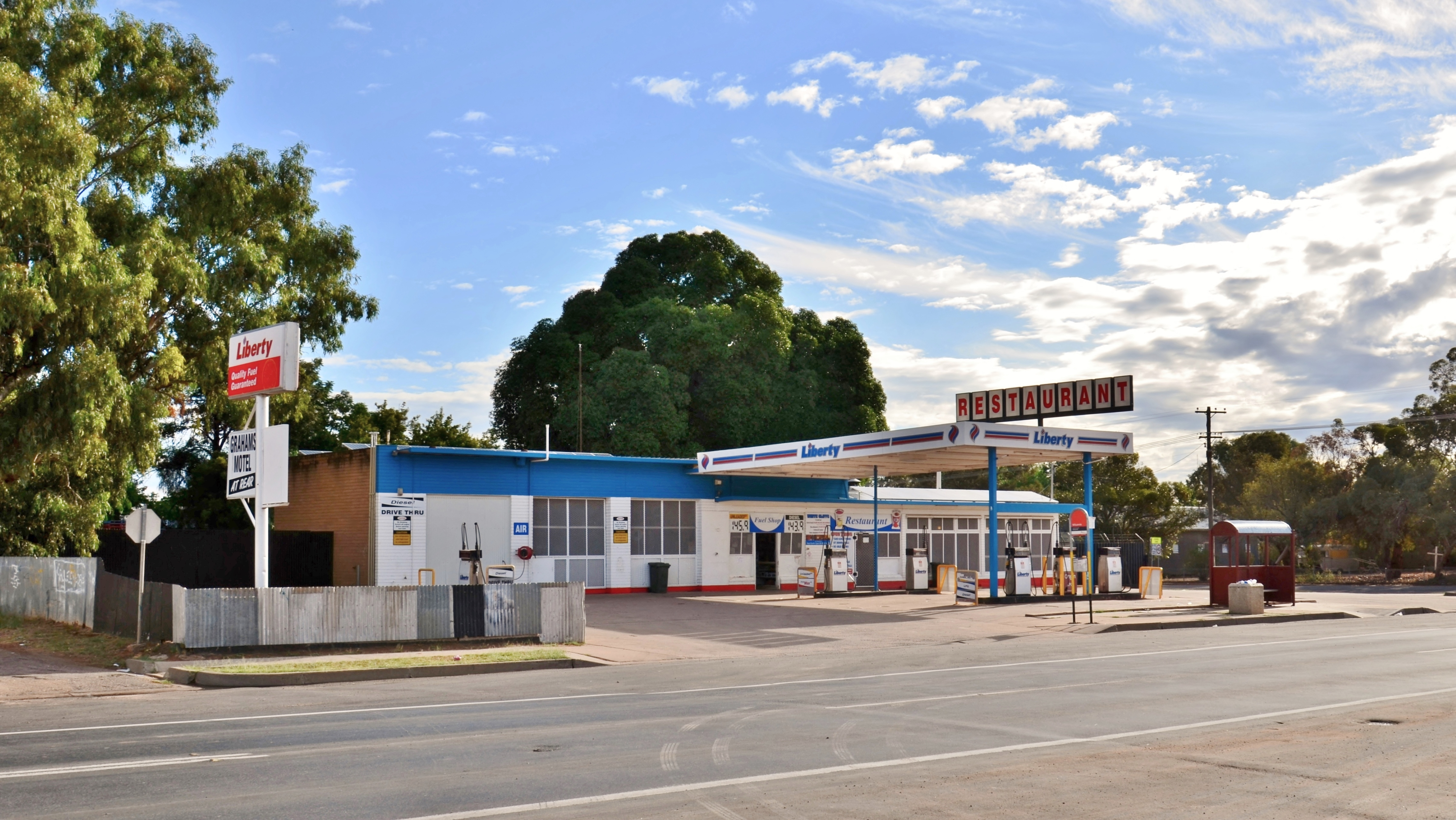
The Wilcannia Roadhouse on Myers Street, with the regional coach stop in front of it

Wilcannia is served by NSW TrainLink coaches between Dubbo railway station and Broken Hill, which stop in town and at the Emmdale Roadhouse down the Barrier Highway. Bus route 595 also connects the town to Broken Hill.

=== Airport ===
Wilcannia Airport (IATA: WIO, ICAO: YWCA) is 9 kilometers (6 miles) from the centre of Wilcannia. The airport has an asphalt runway of 3,051 feet and a clay runway of 3,701 feet. It is located at the coordinates 31°31′10″S 143°22′50″E.

== Demographics and disadvantage ==
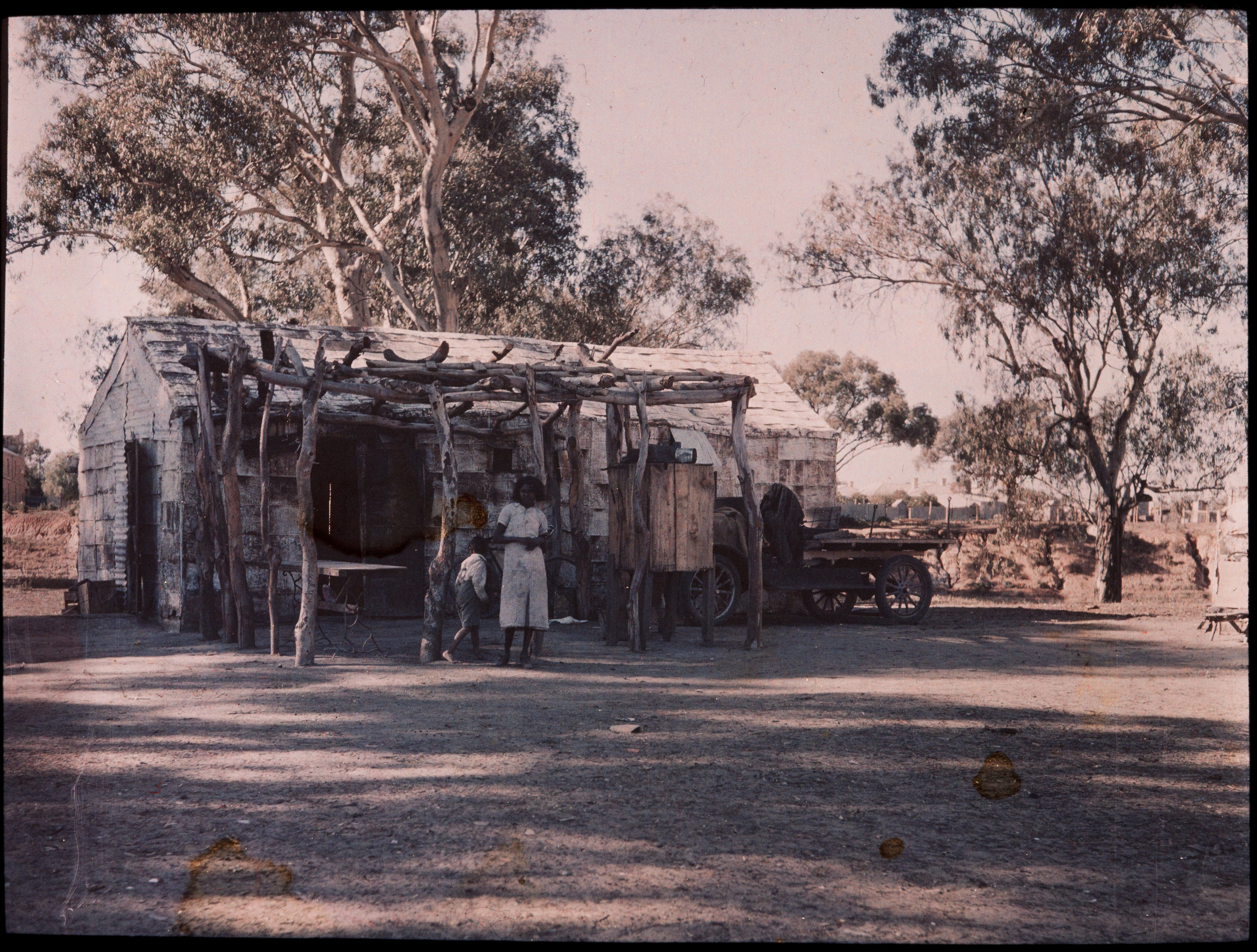
Barkindji People outside a house, Wilcannia, c.1937

From the 2021 Census, Wilcannia had a population of 539 with 333 (61.8%) people being of Aboriginal or Torres Strait Islander descent, mostly from the Barkindji nation. Wilcannia has 273 private dwellings. The town was listed as one of the most socially disadvantaged areas of New South Wales according to the 2015 Dropping Off The Edge report.

Predominantly populated by Aboriginal Australians, Wilcannia has received national and international attention for government deprivation of its community's needs, and the low life expectancy of its residents. For Indigenous men, that figure is 37 years of age.

Residents have reported that water quality in Wilcannia is unsafe, leading locals to rely on boxed water transported from Broken Hill, nearly 200 kilometres (120 mi) away. In 2021 the town was one of the worst hit by the COVID-19 pandemic in New South Wales, and the government's refusal to ban tourists from the area to preserve the health of its struggling residents was criticised. In September 2021, the New Matilda website published an investigation into allegations of discrimination against Wilcannia residents during the COVID-19 pandemic, citing leaked documents from Central Darling Shire Council.

=== In the media ===
The town's social issues were highlighted in the first episode of a two-part BBC3 documentary made by Reggie Yates, Reggie Yates: Hidden Australia, entitled "Episode 1: Black in the Outback", which was first broadcast online on 16 January 2017. In March 2017 the BBC, in response to complaints about the biased and misleading view portrayed, investigated the claims and suspended the production company pending the outcome of the review. The BBC apologised for allowing the programme to go to air.

In July 2017, ABC Radio National highlighted Wilcannia's positive social aspects in a 6-part series called Positively Wilcannia, produced by the podcast The Real Thing.

During the COVID-19 pandemic in Australia, multiple media outlets highlighted how poor living conditions and overcrowding in houses in Wilcannia resulted in the town having Australia's highest per-capita case rate, with one-sixth of residents testing positive to the virus; about 90% of them were Aboriginal. A parliamentary inquiry into New South Wales' handling of the pandemic was told that community leaders warned authorities a year earlier about how Wilcannia's overcrowding situation could lead to a crisis if the virus entered the town.

Historical population
Year	Pop.	±%
1921	592	—
1933	623	+5.2%
1947	799	+28.3%
1954	821	+2.8%
1961		—
1966	800	—
1971	936	+17.0%
1976	1,023	+9.3%
1981	982	−4.0%
1986	1,048	+6.7%
1991	942	−10.1%
1996	688	−27.0%
2001	685	−0.4%
2006	596	−13.0%
2011	604	+1.3%
2016	549	−9.1%
2021	539	−1.8%
Source: Australian Bureau of Statistics data.

== Notable people ==
- Annie Moysey, known as Wilcannia's Grandmother
- The Wilcannia Mob, a hip hop musical group of five Indigenous Australians
- Owen Whyman, initiator of political party Indigenous-Aboriginal Party of Australia
- Sarah Donnelley, winner of the 2020 ARIA Music Teacher Award.

== Gallery ==
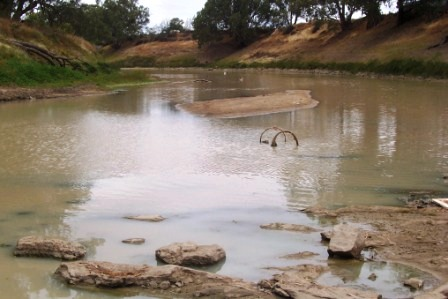
from the bed of the Darling River

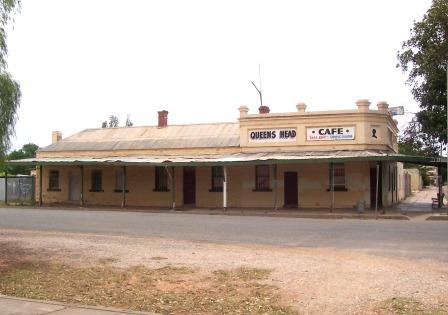
Street Scene

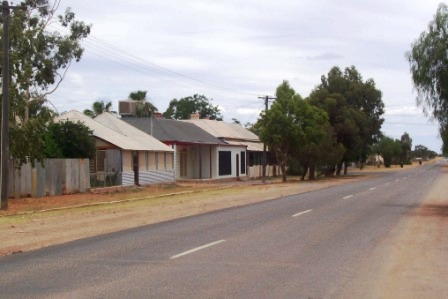
Street Scene

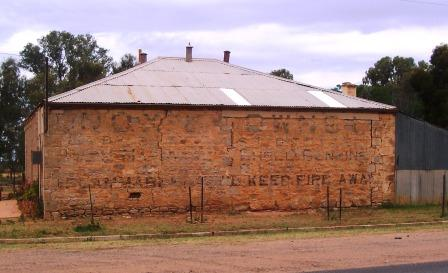
Former warehouse now Residence and Art Studio

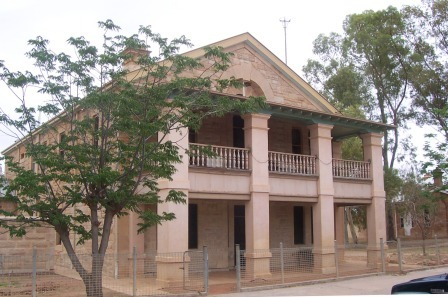
Wilcannia Police Station with Melia azedarach

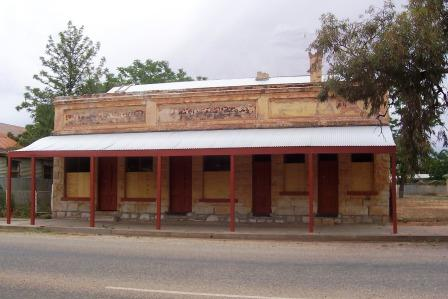
Now a Pharmacy and residence 2016

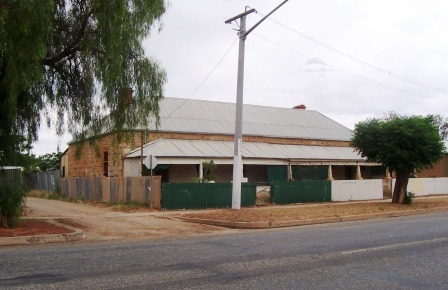
Residence near the Anglican Church

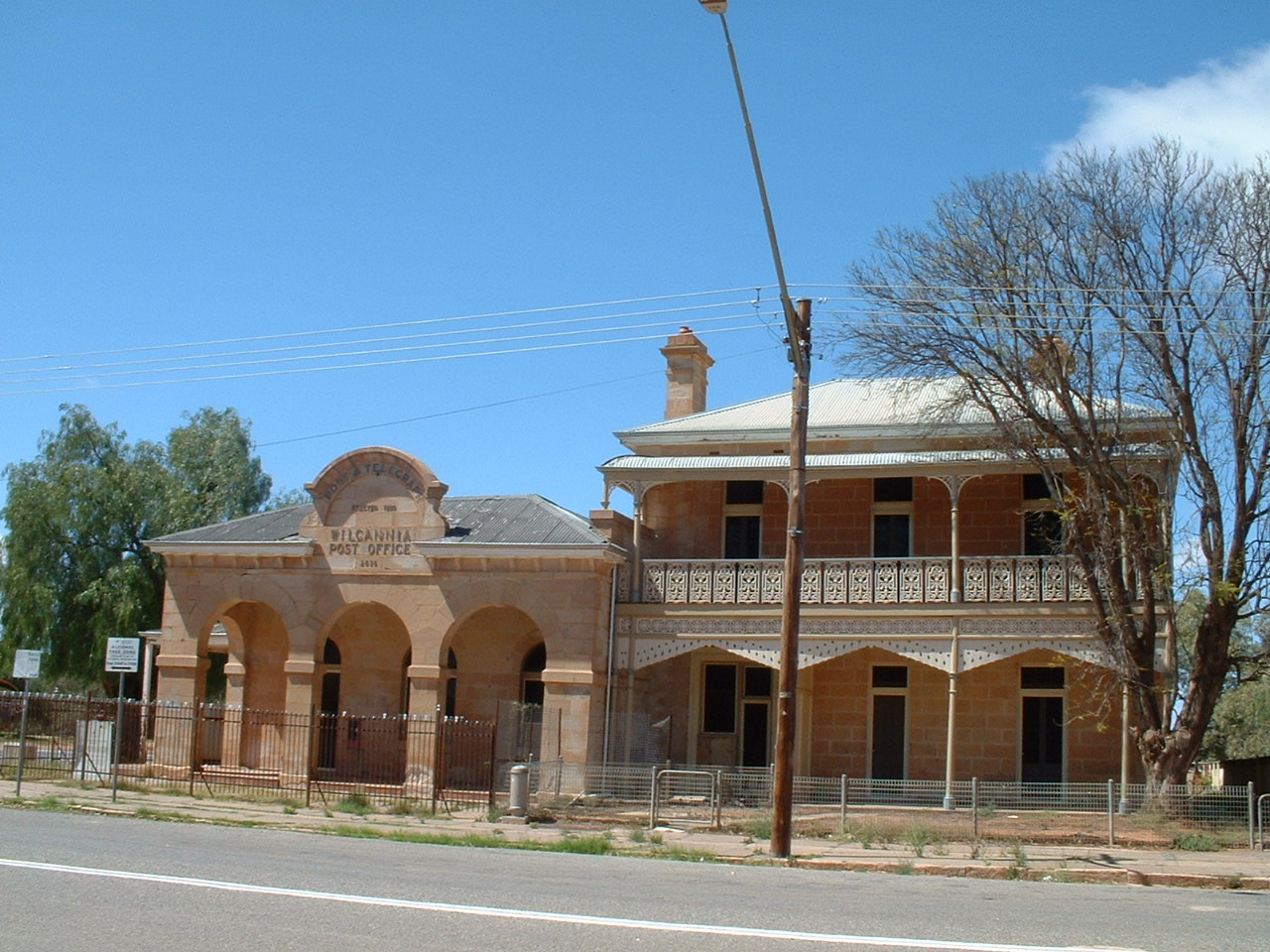
Old Post Office

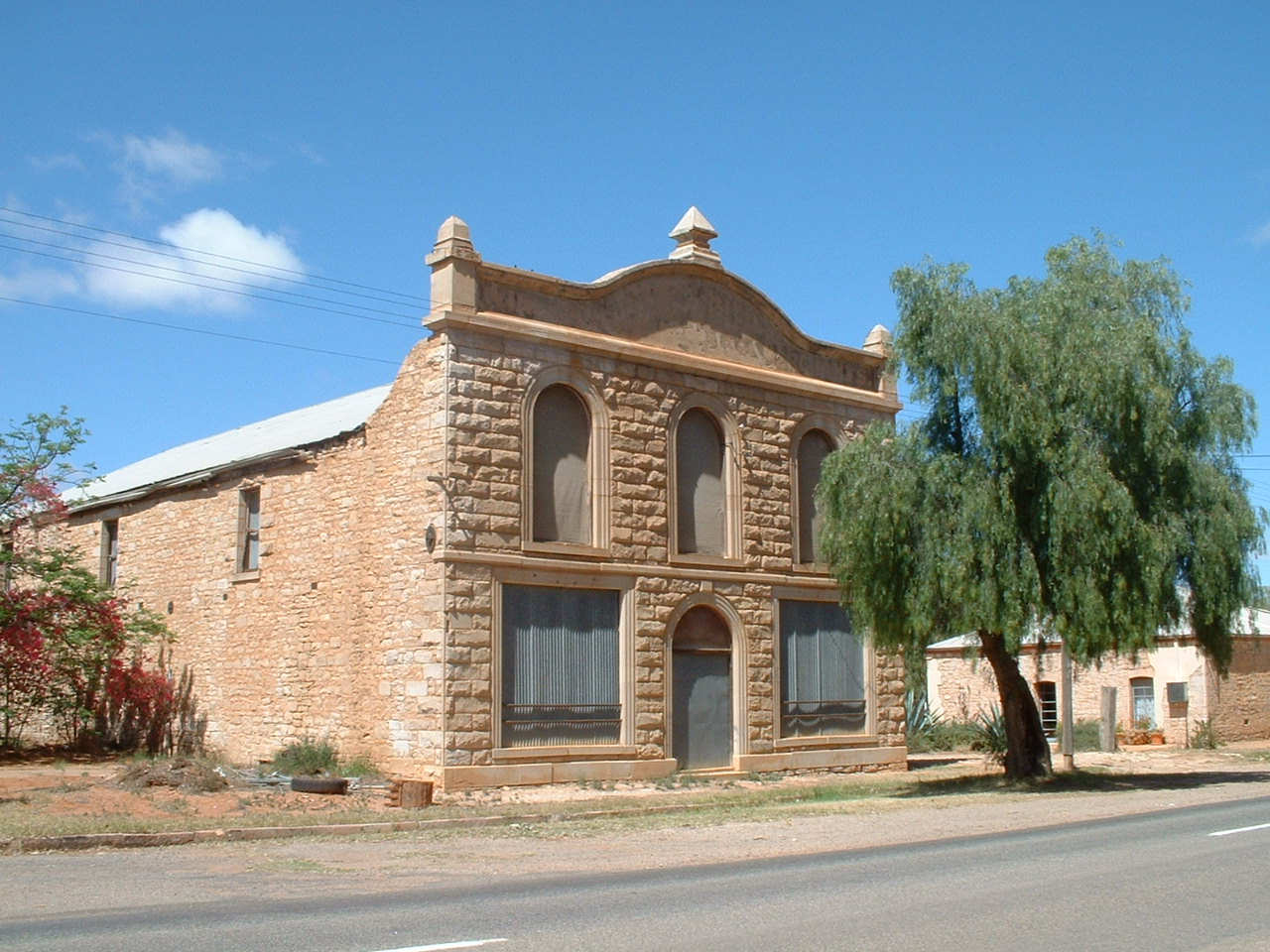
Old warehouse

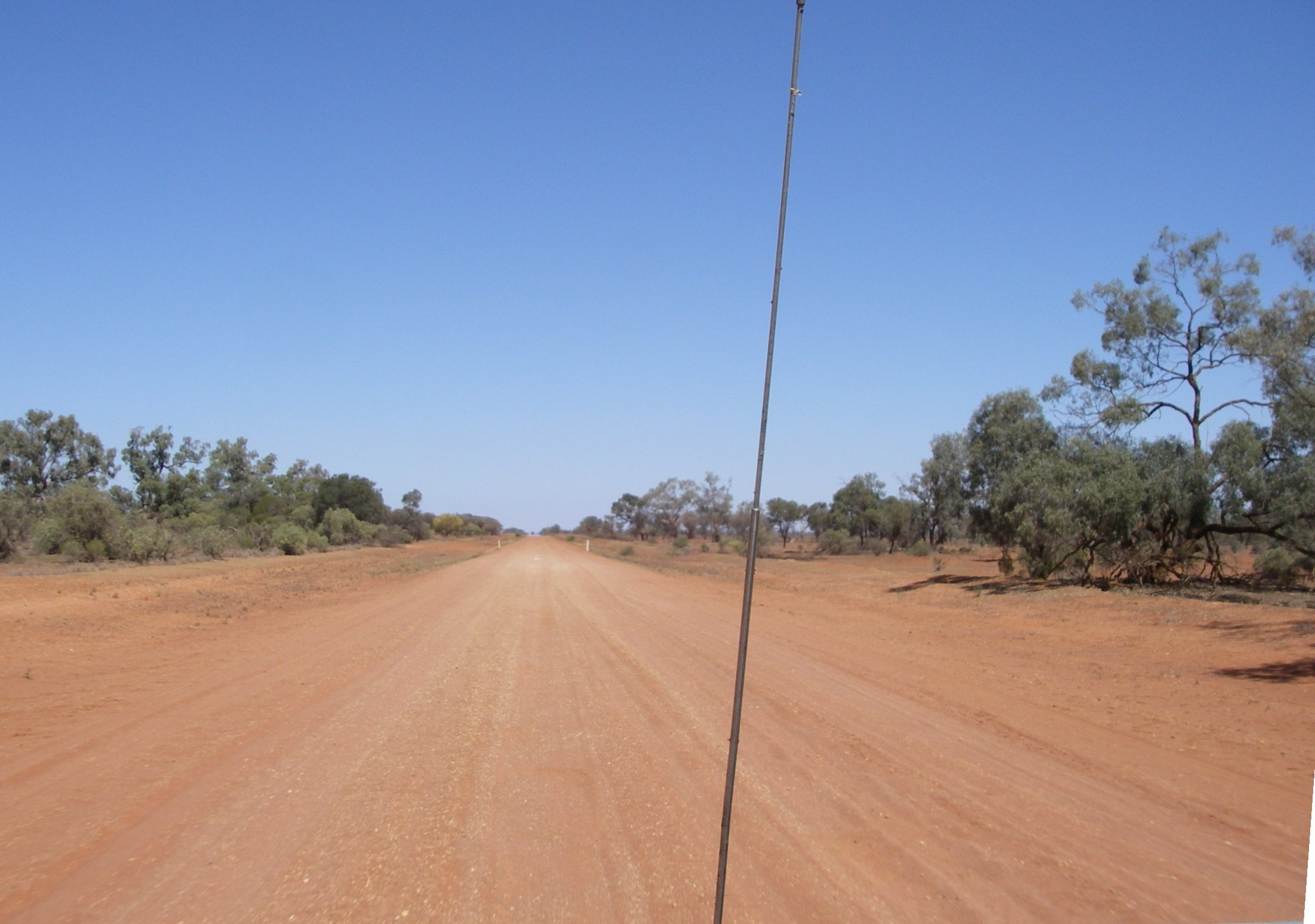
The Bourke-Wilcannia road, near Bourke

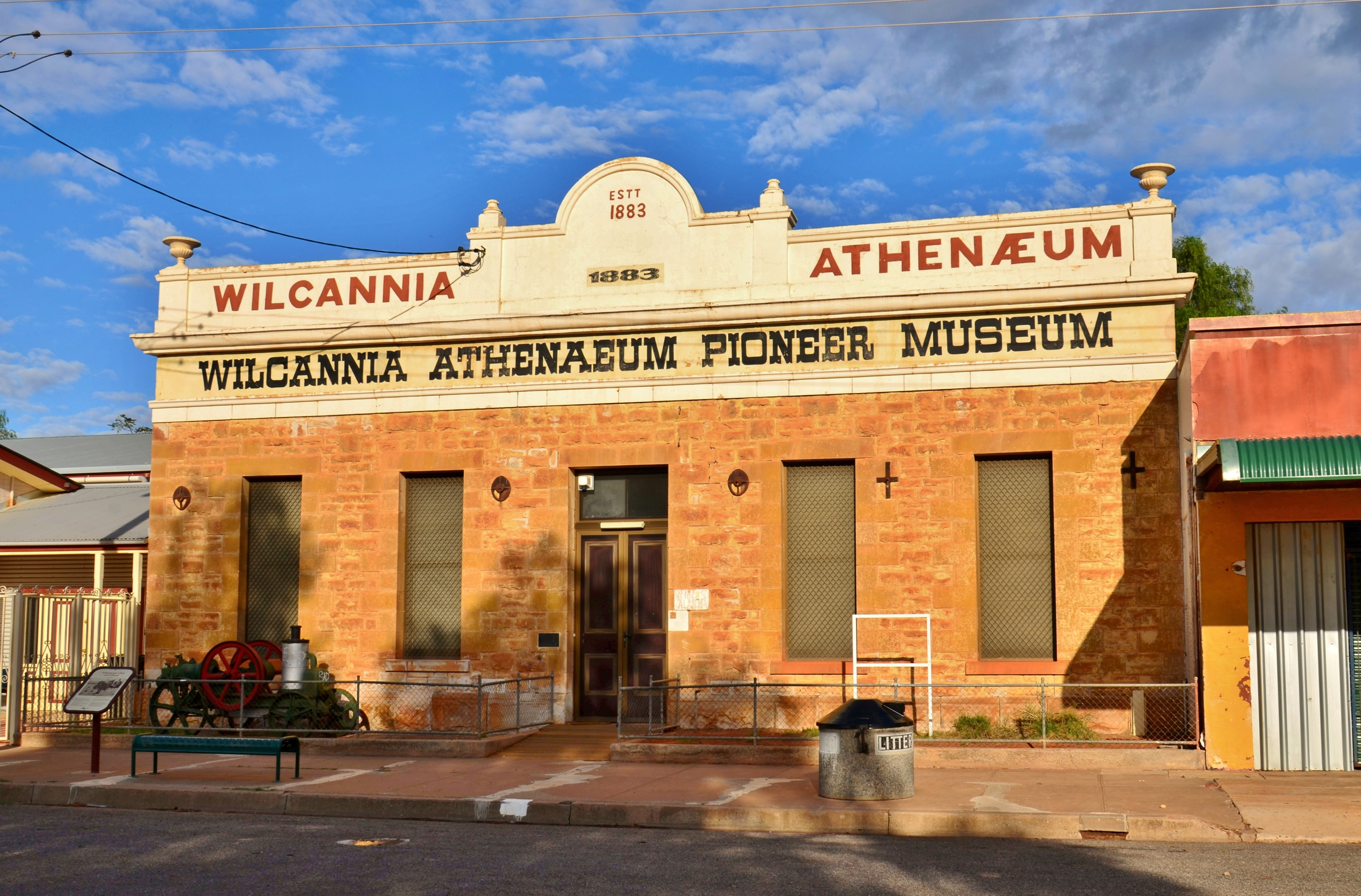
Wilcannia Athenaeum

== See also ==
- Wilcannia Athenaeum
- List of extreme temperatures in Australia
