= Electoral results for the district of Glebe =

Election results for Glebe, New South Wales, Australia

Glebe or The Glebe, an electoral district of the Legislative Assembly in the Australian state of New South Wales had two incarnations, from 1859 to 1920 and from 1927 to 1941.

Election	Member	Party		
1859	John Campbell	None		
1860	Thomas Smart	None		
1864	Thomas Smart	None		
1865 by	Thomas Smart	None		
1869	Sir George Allen	None		
1872	Sir George Allen	None		
1873 by	Sir George Allen	None		
1874	Sir George Allen	None		
1877	Sir George Allen	None		
1880	Sir George Allen	None		
1882	Sir George Allen	None		
1883 by	Michael Chapman	None	Member	Party
1885	John Meeks	None	William Wilkinson	None
1887	Michael Chapman	Free Trade	William Wilkinson	Free Trade
1889	Michael Chapman	Free Trade	Bruce Smith	Free Trade
1891	Thomas Houghton	Labour	Bruce Smith	Free Trade
1894	James Hogue	Free Trade		
1895	James Hogue	Free Trade		
1898	James Hogue	Free Trade		
1898 by	James Hogue	Free Trade		
1901	James Hogue	Liberal Reform		
1904	James Hogue	Liberal Reform		
1904 by	James Hogue	Liberal Reform		
1907	James Hogue	Liberal Reform		
1910	Tom Keegan	Labor		
1913	Tom Keegan	Labor		
1917	Tom Keegan	Labor		
Election	Member	Party		
1927	Tom Keegan	Labor		
1930	Tom Keegan	Labor		
1932	Tom Keegan	Labor		
1935	Bill Carlton	Labor		
1938	Bill Carlton	Labor		

== Election results ==
=== Elections in the 1930s ===
==== 1938 ====
1938 New South Wales state election: Glebe
Party	Candidate	Votes	%	±%
Labor	Bill Carlton	7,023	46.0	−13.0
Industrial Labor	Horace Foley	6,218	40.7	+40.7
Independent	Bertie Lewis	2,021	13.2	+13.2
Total formal votes		15,262	96.8	−1.0
Informal votes		500	3.2	+1.0
Turnout		15,762	95.9	+0.3
Two-candidate-preferred result
Labor	Bill Carlton	7,899	51.8	
Industrial Labor	Horace Foley	7,363	48.2	
Labor hold		Swing	N/A	

==== 1935 ====
1935 New South Wales state election: Glebe
Party	Candidate	Votes	%	±%
Labor (NSW)	Bill Carlton	8,846	59.0	−2.6
Independent	Henry Wood	3,676	24.5	+24.5
Independent	Bertie Lewis	1,894	12.6	+12.6
Communist	Tom Dowling	566	3.8	+1.4
Total formal votes		14,982	97.8	−0.3
Informal votes		338	2.2	+0.3
Turnout		15,320	95.6	+0.6
Labor (NSW) hold		Swing	N/A	

==== 1932 ====
1932 New South Wales state election: Glebe
Party	Candidate	Votes	%	±%
Labor (NSW)	Tom Keegan	9,485	61.6	−17.0
United Australia	William Nicol	4,421	28.7	+8.4
Federal Labor	Northey Du Maurier	1,125	7.3	+7.3
Communist	Stanley Moran	362	2.4	+1.3
Total formal votes		15,393	98.1	+0.3
Informal votes		301	1.9	−0.3
Turnout		15,694	95.0	+1.4
Labor (NSW) hold		Swing	N/A	

- Preferences were not distributed.

==== 1930 ====
1930 New South Wales state election: Glebe
Party	Candidate	Votes	%	±%
Labor	Tom Keegan	11,955	78.6	
Nationalist	Arthur Butterell	3,083	20.3	
Communist	Herbert Huggett	166	1.1	
Total formal votes		15,204	97.8	
Informal votes		345	2.2	
Turnout		15,549	93.6	
Labor hold		Swing		

=== Elections in the 1920s ===
==== 1927 ====
1927 New South Wales state election: Glebe
Party	Candidate	Votes	%	±%
Labor	Tom Keegan	7,777	65.8	
Nationalist	Hedley Rogers	4,042	34.2	
Total formal votes		11,819	99.0	
Informal votes		124	1.0	
Turnout		11,943	81.2	
Labor win		(new seat)		

District recreated

==== 1920 - 1927 ====
District abolished

=== Elections in the 1910s ===
==== 1917 ====
1917 New South Wales state election: Glebe
Party	Candidate	Votes	%	±%
Labor	Tom Keegan	4,106	57.6	+0.4
Nationalist	Walter Clutton	2,947	41.3	−1.5
Independent	David Middleton	78	1.1	+1.1
Total formal votes		7,131	98.8	+1.0
Informal votes		83	1.2	−1.0
Turnout		7,214	60.0	−13.4
Labor hold		Swing	+0.4	

==== 1913 ====
1913 New South Wales state election: Glebe
Party	Candidate	Votes	%	±%
Labor	Tom Keegan	5,299	57.2	
Liberal Reform	Rudolph Bohrsmann	3,963	42.8	
Total formal votes		9,262	97.8	
Informal votes		211	2.2	
Turnout		9,473	73.4	
Labor hold				

==== 1910 ====
1910 New South Wales state election: The Glebe
Party	Candidate	Votes	%	±%
Labour	Tom Keegan	4,251	50.8	
Liberal Reform	James Hogue (defeated)	4,115	49.2	
Total formal votes		8,366	98.6	
Informal votes		113	1.3	
Turnout		8,479	74.1	
Labour gain from Liberal Reform				

=== Elections in the 1900s ===
==== 1907 ====
1907 New South Wales state election: The Glebe
Party	Candidate	Votes	%	±%
Liberal Reform	James Hogue	3,240	53.9	
Independent	John Haynes	2,774	46.1	
Total formal votes		6,014	97.0	
Informal votes		187	3.0	
Turnout		6,201	66.5	
Liberal Reform hold				

==== 1904 by-election ====
1904 Glebe by-election Saturday 10 September
Party	Candidate	Votes	%	±%
Liberal Reform	James Hogue (re-elected)	1,684	95.0	
Independent	Vincent Taylor	88	5.0	
Total formal votes		1,772	99.4	
Informal votes		10	0.6	
Turnout		1,782	20.6 (Note: estimate based on an electoral roll of 8,632 at the August 1904 election.)	
Liberal Reform hold				

James Hogue was appointed Chief Secretary in the Carruthers ministry.

==== 1904 ====
1904 New South Wales state election: The Glebe
Party	Candidate	Votes	%	±%
Liberal Reform	James Hogue	2,667	53.7	
Labour	John Grant	1,579	31.8	
Independent Liberal	Percy Lucas	474	9.5	
Progressive	Lewis Abrams	250	5.0	
Total formal votes		4,970	99.0	
Informal votes		52	1.0	
Turnout		5,022	58.2	
Liberal Reform hold				

The Glebe was expanded to include part of Annandale. The member for The Glebe was James Hogue (Liberal Reform). The member for Annandale was William Mahony (Liberal Reform) who successfully contested that seat.

==== 1901 ====
1901 New South Wales state election: Glebe
Party	Candidate	Votes	%	±%
Liberal Reform	James Hogue	936	42.0	−15.9
Independent	William Tate	421	18.9	
Independent	Lewis Abrams	358	16.1	
Labour	Peter Strong	289	13.0	
Independent	Stanley Cole	223	10.0	
Total formal votes		2,227	95.6	−3.7
Informal votes		102	4.4	+3.7
Turnout		2,329	63.8	+2.8
Liberal Reform hold				

=== Elections in the 1890s ===
==== 1898 by-election ====
1898 Glebe by-election Saturday 10 September
Party	Candidate	Votes	%	±%
Free Trade	James Hogue (re-elected)	496	92.5	
Independent	James Jones	40	7.5	
Total formal votes		536	99.4	
Informal votes		3	0.6	
Turnout		539	16.2	
Free Trade hold				

James Hogue was appointed Minister for Public Instruction and Labour and Industry in the Reid ministry.

==== 1898 ====
1898 New South Wales colonial election: Glebe
Party	Candidate	Votes	%	±%
Free Trade	James Hogue	1,021	57.9	
National Federal	Bruce Smith	742	42.1	
Total formal votes		1,763	99.3	
Informal votes		12	0.7	
Turnout		1,775	61.0	
Free Trade hold				

==== 1895 ====
1895 New South Wales colonial election: Glebe
Party	Candidate	Votes	%	±%
Free Trade	James Hogue	899	61.2	
Protectionist	Michael Conlon	570	38.8	
Total formal votes		1,469	99.0	
Informal votes		15	1.0	
Turnout		1,484	59.9	
Free Trade hold				

==== 1894 ====
1894 New South Wales colonial election: Glebe
Party	Candidate	Votes	%	±%
Free Trade	James Hogue	786	37.5	
Protectionist	Michael Conlon	438	20.9	
Independent Labour	Thomas Houghton	415	19.8	
Ind. Free Trade	Arthur Eager	248	11.8	
Labour	John Clune	124	5.9	
Ind. Free Trade	William Cary	84	4.0	
Total formal votes		2,095	98.3	
Informal votes		37	1.7	
Turnout		2,132	85.3	
Free Trade win		(previously 2 members)		

==== 1891 ====
1891 New South Wales colonial election: The Glebe Wednesday 17 June
Party	Candidate	Votes	%	±%
Free Trade	Bruce Smith (re-elected 1)	1,479	23.7	
Labour	Thomas Houghton (elected 2)	1,472	23.6	
Protectionist	Michael Conlon	1,383	22.2	
Free Trade	Michael Chapman (defeated)	1,112	17.9	
Ind. Free Trade	John Meeks	581	9.3	
Ind. Free Trade	Fred Walsh	202	3.2	
Total formal votes		6,229	98.9	
Informal votes		68	1.1	
Turnout		3,750	78.9	
Free Trade hold 1				
Labour gain 1 from Free Trade				

=== Elections in the 1880s ===
==== 1889 ====
1889 New South Wales colonial election: The Glebe Saturday 2 February
Party	Candidate	Votes	%	±%
Free Trade	Bruce Smith (elected 1)	1,654	30.7	
Free Trade	Michael Chapman (elected 2)	1,630	30.2	
Protectionist	Michael Conlon	1,103	20.5	
Protectionist	Percy Lucas	1,007	18.7	
Total formal votes		5,394	99.0	
Informal votes		57	1.1	
Turnout		3,071	71.9	
Free Trade hold 2				

==== 1887 ====
1887 New South Wales colonial election: The Glebe Saturday 5 February
Party	Candidate	Votes	%	±%
Free Trade	William Wilkinson (re-elected 1)	1,332	36.0	
Free Trade	Michael Chapman (elected 2)	1,261	34.0	
Free Trade	John Meeks (defeated)	503	13.6	
Free Trade	William Bailey	384	10.4	
Protectionist	Stephen Byrne	225	6.1	
Total formal votes		3,705	97.8	
Informal votes		84	2.2	
Turnout		2,448	67.0	

==== 1885 ====
1885 New South Wales colonial election: The Glebe Friday 16 October
Candidate	Votes	%
William Wilkinson (elected 1)	1,102	33.4
John Meeks (elected 2)	1,069	32.4
Michael Chapman (defeated)	815	24.7
William Bailey	312	9.5
Total formal votes	3,298	98.7
Informal votes	45	1.4
Turnout	1,956	60.1
	(1 new seat)	

==== 1883 by-election ====
1883 Glebe by-election Wednesday 29 August
Candidate	Votes	%
Michael Chapman (elected)	827	55.1
Henry Daly	350	23.3
William Pritchard	323	21.5
Total formal votes	1,500	100.0
Informal votes	0	0.0
Turnout	1,500	54.5

George Allen resigned to go on an extended trip to England.

==== 1882 ====
1882 New South Wales colonial election: The Glebe Friday 1 December
Candidate	Votes	%
George Allen (re-elected)	645	61.5
Michael Fitzpatrick	404	38.5
Total formal votes	1,049	97.2
Informal votes	30	2.8
Turnout	1,079	45.7

==== 1880 ====
1880 New South Wales colonial election: The Glebe Thursday 18 November
Candidate	Votes	%
George Allen (re-elected)	812	72.4
James Graham	309	27.6
Total formal votes	1,121	97.1
Informal votes	34	2.9
Turnout	1,155	58.7

=== Elections in the 1870s ===
==== 1877 ====
1877 New South Wales colonial election: The Glebe Monday 29 October
Candidate	Votes	%
George Allen (re-elected)	1,179	64.8
Charles Mossman	641	35.2
Total formal votes	1,820	97.9
Informal votes	39	2.1
Turnout	1,859	55.2

==== 1874 ====
1874–75 New South Wales colonial election: The Glebe Friday 11 December 1874
Candidate	Votes	%
George Allen (re-elected)	1,239	60.0
John Booth (defeated)	813	39.4
Charles Mossman	14	0.7
Total formal votes	2,066	96.1
Informal votes	83	3.9
Turnout	2,149	68.1

==== 1873 by-election ====
1873 The Glebe by-election Wednesday 17 December
Candidate	Votes	%
George Allen (re-elected)	909	57.7
John Young	666	42.3
Total formal votes	1,575	100.0
Informal votes	0	0.0
Turnout	1,575	52.1

George Allen was appointed Minister of Justice and Public Instruction in the first Parkes ministry.

==== 1872 ====
1872 New South Wales colonial election: The Glebe Monday 19 February
Candidate	Votes	%
George Allen (re-elected)	890	53.6
Charles Mossman	742	44.7
David Buchanan	30	1.8
Total formal votes	1,662	96.5
Informal votes	60	3.5
Turnout	1,722	60.0

=== Elections in the 1860s ===
==== 1869 ====
1869–70 New South Wales colonial election: The Glebe Monday 13 December 1869
Candidate	Votes	%
George Allen (elected)	unopposed	

==== 1865 by-election ====
1865 The Glebe by-election Friday 17 February
Candidate	Votes	%
Thomas Smart (re-elected)	592	61.3
Daniel Dalgleish	374	38.7
Total formal votes	966	100.0
Informal votes	0	0.0
Turnout	966	48.3

Thomas Smart was appointed Colonial Treasurer in the fourth Cowper ministry.

==== 1864 ====
1864–65 New South Wales colonial election: The Glebe Tuesday 29 November 1864
Candidate	Votes	%
Thomas Smart (re-elected)	622	58.0
Daniel Dalgleish	451	42.0
Total formal votes	1,073	100.0
Informal votes	0	0.0
Turnout	1,073	53.7

==== 1860 ====
1860 New South Wales colonial election: The Glebe Friday 14 December
Candidate	Votes	%
Thomas Smart (elected)	393	40.8
William Moffatt	382	39.6
Geoffrey Eagar	189	19.6
Total formal votes	964	100.0
Informal votes	0	0.0
Turnout	964	44.6

=== Elections in the 1850s ===
==== 1859 ====
1859 New South Wales colonial election: The Glebe Wednesday 15 June
Candidate	Votes	%
John Campbell (re-elected)	475	52.8
Ewen Cameron	424	47.2
Total formal votes	899	100.0
Informal votes	0	0.0
Turnout	899	56.8
