= 1904 Glebe state by-election =

Election result for Glebe, New South Wales, Australia

A by-election was held for the New South Wales Legislative Assembly electorate of Glebe on 10 September 1904 because James Hogue had been appointed Chief Secretary in the Carruthers ministry. Until 1907, members appointed to a ministerial position were required to face a by-election. These were generally uncontested. On this occasion a poll was required in Bingara (Samuel Moore), Glebe and Tenterfield (Charles Lee) and all were comfortably re-elected. The four other ministers, Joseph Carruthers (St George), James Ashton (Goulburn), Broughton O'Conor (Sherbrooke) and Charles Wade (Gordon), were re-elected unopposed.

Vincent Taylor was considered a vexatious candidate. He was a candidate at the 1901 election for Sydney-King, receiving 4 votes, and then for the Belmore Ward of the Sydney City Council, receiving just 3 votes.

== Dates ==
Date	Event
27 August 1904	James Hogue appointed Chief Secretary.
30 August 1904	Writ of election issued by the Speaker of the Legislative Assembly.
6 September 1904	Nominations.
10 September 1904	Polling day
20 September 1904	Return of writ

== Result ==
1904 Glebe by-election Saturday 10 September
Party	Candidate	Votes	%	±%
Liberal Reform	James Hogue (re-elected)	1,684	95.0	
Independent	Vincent Taylor	88	5.0	
Total formal votes		1,772	99.4	
Informal votes		10	0.6	
Turnout		1,782	20.6 (Note: estimate based on an electoral roll of 8,632 at the August 1904 election.)	
Liberal Reform hold				

== Aftermath ==
These were the final ministerial by-elections as the Constitution of New South Wales was amended to exempt any office of the executive government created by an Act of Parliament from being an office of profit under the crown, disqualifying a person from sitting in parliament.

== See also ==
- Electoral results for the district of Glebe
