= 1883 Glebe colonial by-election =

By-election in New South Wales, Australia

A by-election was held for the New South Wales Legislative Assembly electorate of Glebe on 22 May 1883 because Sir George Allen resigned to go on an extended trip to England.

== Dates ==
Date	Event
14 August 1883	Sir George Allen reigned.
18 August 1883	Writ of election issued by the Speaker of the Legislative Assembly.
27 August 1883	Nominations
29 August 1883	Polling day
5 September 1883	Return of writ

== Result ==
1883 Glebe by-election Wednesday 29 August
Candidate	Votes	%
Michael Chapman (elected)	827	55.1
Henry Daly	350	23.3
William Pritchard	323	21.5
Total formal votes	1,500	100.0
Informal votes	0	0.0
Turnout	1,500	54.5

== See also ==
- Electoral results for the district of Glebe
- List of New South Wales state by-elections
