= 1904 Bingara state by-election =

Election result for Bingara, New South Wales, Australia

A by-election was held for the New South Wales Legislative Assembly electorate of Bingara on 14 September 1904 because Samuel Moore had been appointed Secretary for Mines in the Carruthers ministry. Until 1904, members appointed to a ministerial position were required to face a by-election. These were generally uncontested. On this occasion a poll was required in Bingara, Glebe (James Hogue) and Tenterfield (Charles Lee) and all were comfortably re-elected. The four other ministers, Joseph Carruthers (St George), James Ashton (Goulburn), Broughton O'Conor (Sherbrooke) and Charles Wade (Gordon), were re-elected unopposed.

== Dates ==
Date	Event
27 August 1904	Samuel Moore appointed Secretary for Mines.
30 August 1904	Writ of election issued by the Speaker of the Legislative Assembly.
8 September 1904	Nominations
14 September 1904	Polling day
20 September 1904	Return of writ

== Result ==
1904 Bingara by-election Wednesday 14 September
Party	Candidate	Votes	%	±%
Liberal Reform	Samuel Moore (re-elected)	2,261	79.8	
Labour	Frank Foster	572	20.2	
Total formal votes		2,833	100.0	
Informal votes		0	0.0	
Turnout		2,833	73.8 (Note: Estimate based on an electoral roll of 6,471 at the August 1904 election.)	
Liberal Reform hold		Swing	N/A	

== See also ==
- Electoral results for the district of Bingara
