= 1904 Tenterfield state by-election =

Election result for Tenterfield, New South Wales, Australia

A by-election was held for the New South Wales Legislative Assembly electorate of Tenterfield on 14 September 1904 because Charles Lee had been appointed Secretary for Public Works in the Carruthers ministry. Until 1907, members appointed to a ministerial position were required to face a by-election. These were generally uncontested. On this occasion a poll was required in Bingara (Samuel Moore), Glebe (James Hogue) and Tenterfield and all were comfortably re-elected. The four other ministers, Joseph Carruthers (St George), James Ashton (Goulburn), Broughton O'Conor (Sherbrooke) and Charles Wade (Gordon), were re-elected unopposed.

Robert Pyers (Progressive) was the former member for The Richmond which had been partly absorbed by Tenterfield for the August 1904 election and Pyers had been defeated by Lee.

== Dates ==
Date	Event
27 August 1904	Charles Lee appointed Secretary for Public Works.
30 August 1904	Writ of election issued by the Speaker of the Legislative Assembly.
8 September 1904	Nominations
14 September 1904	Polling day
20 September 1904	Return of writ

== Result ==
1904 Tenterfield by-election Wednesday 14 September
Party	Candidate	Votes	%	±%
Liberal Reform	Charles Lee (re-elected)	2,470	61.7	+5.4
Progressive	Robert Pyers	1,536	38.3	−5.4
Total formal votes		4,006	100.0	+0.7
Informal votes		0	0.0	−0.7
Turnout		4,006	59.6 (Note: estimate based on an electoral roll of 6,724 at the August 1904 election.)	−0.1
Liberal Reform hold		Swing	+5.4	

== See also ==
- Electoral results for the district of Tenterfield
