= 1898 Glebe colonial by-election =

Election result for Glebe, New South Wales, Australia

A by-election was held for the New South Wales Legislative Assembly electorate of Glebe on 10 September 1898 because James Hogue had been appointed Public Instruction and Minister for Labour and Industry in the Reid ministry. Until 1904, members appointed to a ministerial position were required to face a by-election. These were generally uncontested. Of the three ministers appointed with the second arrangement of the Reid ministry, Glebe was the only electorate in which the by-election was contested.

== Dates ==
Date	Event
27 August 1898	James Hogue appointed Minister Public Instruction and Minister for Labour and Industry.
31 August 1898	Writ of election issued by the Speaker of the Legislative Assembly.
6 September 1898	Nominations
10 September 1898	Polling day
13 September 1898	Return of writ

== Result ==
1898 Glebe by-election Saturday 10 September
Party	Candidate	Votes	%	±%
Free Trade	James Hogue (re-elected)	496	92.5	
Independent	James Jones	40	7.5	
Total formal votes		536	99.4	
Informal votes		3	0.6	
Turnout		539	16.2	
Free Trade hold				

== See also ==
- Electoral results for the district of Glebe
