= 1873 Glebe colonial by-election =

By-election in New South Wales, Australia

A by-election was held for the New South Wales Legislative Assembly electorate of The Glebe on 22 May 1873 because George Allen had been appointed Minister of Justice and Public Instruction in the first Parkes ministry. Such ministerial by-elections were usually uncontested.

John Young was a builder, most notable for building St Mary's Cathedral in Sydney and the Johnston Street group of houses in Annandale.

== Dates ==
Date	Event
9 December 1873	George Allen appointed Minister of Justice and Public Instruction.
10 December 1873	Writ of election issued by the Speaker of the Legislative Assembly.
15 December 1873	Nominations
17 December 1873	Polling day
23 December 1873	Return of writ

== Result ==
1873 The Glebe by-election Wednesday 17 December
Candidate	Votes	%
George Allen (re-elected)	909	57.7
John Young	666	42.3
Total formal votes	1,575	100.0
Informal votes	0	0.0
Turnout	1,575	52.1

== See also ==
- Electoral results for the district of Glebe
- List of New South Wales state by-elections
