= Wade ministry =

New South Wales government ministry led by Charles Wade

- 33rd Cabinet of the State of New South Wales

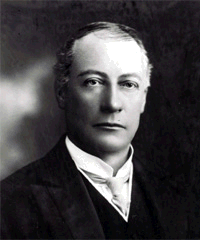
- Premier Charles Wade
- Date formed: 2 October 1907
- Date dissolved: 20 October 1910

People and organisations
- Monarch: Edward VII / George V
- Governor: Sir Harry Rawson / Lord Chelmsford
- Premier: Charles Wade
- No. of ministers: 10
- Member party: Liberal Reform
- Status in legislature: Hung parliament
- Opposition party: Labor
- Opposition leader: James McGowen

History
- Election: 1907 New South Wales election
- Outgoing election: 1910 New South Wales election
- Predecessor: Carruthers ministry
- Successor: McGowen ministry

The Wade ministry was the 33rd ministry of the New South Wales Government, and was led by the 17th Premier, Charles Wade. The title of Premier was widely used to refer to the Leader of Government, but was not a formal position in the government until 1920. Instead the Premier was appointed to another portfolio and Wade chose to keep the portfolio of Attorney General he held in the Carruthers ministry.

Wade was elected to the New South Wales Legislative Assembly in 1903, serving until 1917. Liberal Reform had won 45 seats at the 1904 election, 1 short of a majority. In 1907 it had negotiated a coalition agreement with the Progressive Party, however this was rejected by a vote of Progressive parliamentary members. The party leader Thomas Waddell resigned and joined the Liberal Reform Party, along with John Perry and 3 others, giving Liberal Reform a majority in the Legislative Assembly.

Campaigning for the 1907 state election involved personal allegations against Carruthers concerning his law firm representing William Willis in dubious transactions that were examined in the Royal Commission by Justice William Owen into the administration of the Lands Department. Carruthers fought back strongly with attacks on the Federal government tariff on wire netting and a program of reform appealing to the parties temperance supporters. The election was held in September and saw Liberal Reform lose its recently gained majority, returning to 45 seats, with Labour and independents gaining seats from the collapse of the Progressive Party.

Carruthers was exhausted by the campaign and resigned as Premier at the end of September and was succeeded by Wade.

There was a re-shuffle in 1908 with Agriculture being separated from mines. At the end of 1909 John Garland was appointed Solicitor General and Minister of Justice to assist Wade in his portfolio of Attorney General.

The ministry covers the period from 2 October 1907 until 20 October 1910, when Wade was defeated by McGowen and the Labour Party.

== Composition of ministry ==
The composition of the ministry was announced by Premier Wade on 2 October 1907 and covers the period until 20 October 1910

| Portfolio | Minister | Party | Term start | Term end | Term length |
|---|---|---|---|---|---|
| Premier; Attorney General | Charles Wade KC | Liberal Reform | 2 October 1907 | 20 October 1910 | 3 years, 18 days |
| Minister of Justice | Charles Wade KC | Liberal Reform | 2 October 1907 | 20 December 1909 | 2 years, 79 days |
| Minister of Justice | John Garland MLC | Liberal Reform | 21 December 1909 | 20 October 1910 | 303 days |
| Solicitor General | John Garland MLC | Liberal Reform | 21 December 1909 | 20 October 1910 | 303 days |
| Chief Secretary; Registrar of Records | William Wood | Liberal Reform | 2 October 1907 | 20 October 1910 | 3 years, 18 days |
| Minister for Labour and Industry | William Wood | Liberal Reform | 2 October 1907 | 21 January 1908 | 111 days |
| Minister for Labour and Industry | James Hogue | Liberal Reform | 22 January 1908 | 20 October 1910 | 2 years, 271 days |
| Secretary for Lands | Samuel Moore | Liberal Reform | 2 October 1907 | 20 October 1910 | 3 years, 18 days |
| Secretary for Public Works | Charles Lee | Liberal Reform | 2 October 1907 | 20 October 1910 | 3 years, 18 days |
| Secretary for Mines and Agriculture | John Perry | Liberal Reform | 2 October 1907 | 21 January 1908 | 111 days |
| Minister for Agriculture | John Perry | Liberal Reform | 22 January 1908 | 20 October 1910 | 2 years, 271 days |
| Secretary for Mines | William Wood | Liberal Reform | 22 January 1908 | 20 October 1910 | 2 years, 271 days |
| Treasurer; Collector of Internal Revenue | Thomas Waddell | Liberal Reform | 2 October 1907 | 20 October 1910 | 3 years, 18 days |
| Minister of Public Instruction | James Hogue | Liberal Reform | 2 October 1907 | 20 October 1910 | 3 years, 18 days |
| Vice-President of the Executive Council; Representative of the Government in Legislative Council | John Hughes MLC | Liberal Reform | 2 October 1907 | 20 October 1910 | 3 years, 18 days |
| Minister without portfolio | James Ashton MLC | Liberal Reform | 2 October 1907 | 25 June 1909 | 1 year, 265 days |
| Minister without portfolio | Charles Oakes | Liberal Reform | 2 October 1907 | 20 October 1910 | 3 years, 18 days |

Ministers were members of the Legislative Assembly unless otherwise noted.

== See also ==
  - Members of Legislative Assembly
  - (1907-1910)
  - Members of Legislative Council
  - (1907–1910)

| Preceded by Carruthers ministry | Wade ministry 1907 – 1910 | Succeeded by McGowen ministry |
