= 1865 Glebe colonial by-election =

By-election in New South Wales, Australia

A by-election was held for the New South Wales Legislative Assembly electorate of The Glebe on 17 February 1865 because Thomas Smart had been appointed Colonial Treasurer in the fourth Cowper ministry. Such ministerial by-elections were usually uncontested however on this occasion a poll was required in East Sydney (Charles Cowper), The Glebe and West Sydney (John Darvall and John Robertson). Each minister was comfortably re-elected. Only The Paterson (William Arnold) was uncontested.

Daniel Dalgleish was a former member for West Sydney who was defeated at the election on 24 November 1864. He was then an unsuccessful candidate at the elections for The Glebe (29 November 1864) and Goldfields South (10 January 1865). The day after his loss here, Dalgelish was again unsuccessful at the West Sydney by-election (18 February 1865), which was the final occasion on which he stood for parliament.

== Dates ==
Date	Event
3 February 1865	Fourth Cowper ministry appointed.
8 February 1865	Writ of election issued by the Speaker of the Legislative Assembly.
15 February 1865	Nominations
17 February 1865	Polling day
21 February 1865	Return of writ

== Result ==
1865 The Glebe by-election Friday 17 February
Candidate	Votes	%
Thomas Smart (re-elected)	592	61.3
Daniel Dalgleish	374	38.7
Total formal votes	966	100.0
Informal votes	0	0.0
Turnout	966	48.3

== See also ==
- Electoral results for the district of Glebe
- List of New South Wales state by-elections
