= Deniliquin Independent =

Australian newspaper (1901–1946)

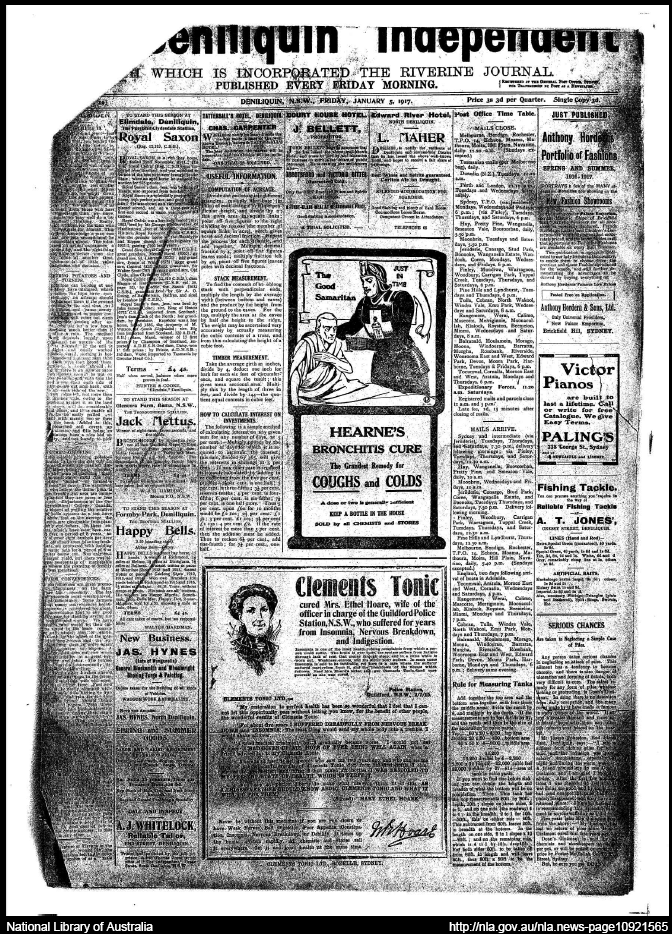
Front cover of the Deniliquin Independent on 5 January 1917.

The Deniliquin Independent, also published as The Independent, was a weekly English language newspaper published in Deniliquin, New South Wales, Australia.

== History ==
The Deniliquin Independent was published between 1899 and 1947, when it was absorbed into the Pastoral Times. Another newspaper published in Deniliquin from 1899, the Riverine Journal, was incorporated into the Deniliquin Independent in 1901.

== Digitisation ==
The paper has been digitised as part of the Australian Newspapers Digitisation Program project of the National Library of Australia.

== See also ==
- List of newspapers in New South Wales
- List of newspapers in Australia
