= 1865 East Sydney colonial by-election =

By-election in New South Wales, Australia

A by-election was held for the New South Wales Legislative Assembly electorate of East Sydney on 17 February 1865 because Charles Cowper had been appointed Premier and Colonial Secretary, forming the fourth Cowper ministry. Such ministerial by-elections were usually uncontested however on this occasion a poll was required in East Sydney, The Glebe (Thomas Smart) and West Sydney (John Darvall and John Robertson). Each minister was comfortably re-elected. Only The Paterson (William Arnold) was uncontested.

Frederick Birmingham was a surveyor and engineer from Parramatta, who was an unsuccessful candidate for Parramatta at the election in November 1864, polling just 16 votes (1.3%)

== Dates ==
Date	Event
3 February 1865	Fourth Cowper ministry appointed.
8 February 1865	Writ of election issued by the Speaker of the Legislative Assembly.
15 February 1865	Nominations
17 February 1865	Polling day
21 February 1865	Return of writ

== Result ==
1865 East Sydney by-election Friday 17 February
Candidate	Votes	%
Charles Cowper (re-elected)	933	87.0
Frederick Birmingham	140	13.0
Total formal votes	1,073	100.0
Informal votes	0	0.0
Turnout	1,073	12.0

== See also ==
- Electoral results for the district of East Sydney
- List of New South Wales state by-elections
