= The Riverine Grazier =

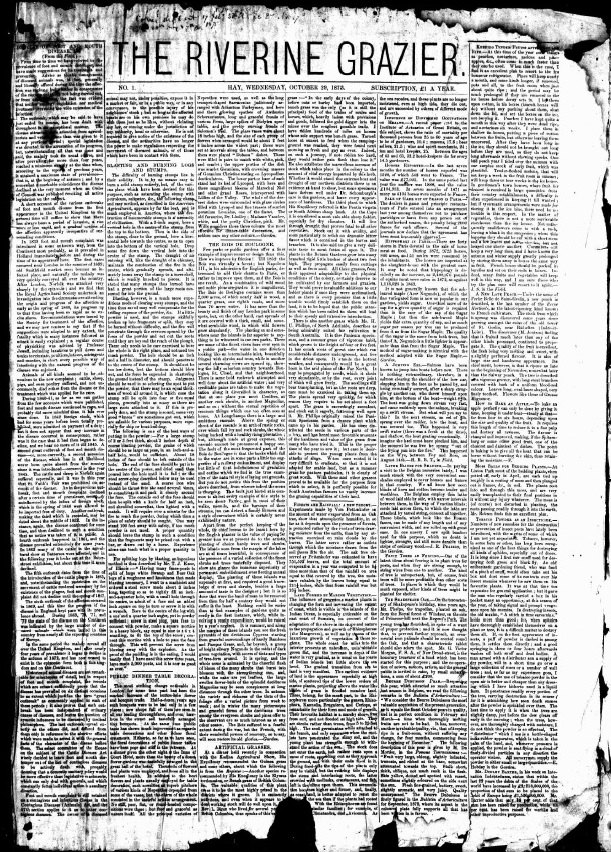
First issue of The Riverine Grazier, 29 October 1873

The Riverine Grazier is an English language newspaper published in Hay, New South Wales, Australia from 1873. The paper absorbed the Riverina Times, Hay Standard and Journal of Water Conservation in October 1902.

== History ==
The first issue of The Riverine Grazier was published on 29 October 1873. The paper was published every Wednesday and could be subscribed to for £1 per year. It contained agricultural information, news and advertisements for goods and services in the area.

Its founder was John Andrew; it was purchased in 1888 by James Ashton (previously a compositor with the Hay Standard then a clerk with Cramsie, Bowden and Co.) and John Johnston (ca.1864 – 29 October 1939) who was previously an accountant with Cobb & Co then branch manager for the Equitable Assurance Company, of New Zealand.

In 1902 it moved to new premises opposite Tattersall's Hotel, Hay, and shortly afterwards purchased and incorporated the Riverina Times (previously the Hay Standard).

== Editors ==
The following individuals have held the position of editor:

Name	Term start	Term end	Term	Ref
John Andrew	1883	1888	5 years	
John Johnston*	1888	1939	51 years	
Gavin Johnston Snr	1939	1975	36 years	
Gavin Johnston* Jnr	1975	1995	20 years	
Tertia Butcher	1995	Incumbent	30 years	

- Died while editor

== Digitisation ==
The various versions of the paper have been digitised as part of the Australian Newspapers Digitisation Program project hosted by the National Library of Australia.

== Bibliography ==
- Holden, W Sprague 1961, Australia goes to press, Melbourne University Publishing, Melbourne
- Mayer, Henry 1964, The press in Australia, Lansdowne Press, Melbourne
- Walker, R B 1976, The newspaper press in New South Wales 1803-1920, Sydney University Press, Sydney
