= February 1865 West Sydney colonial by-election =

By-election in New South Wales, Australia

A by-election was held for the New South Wales Legislative Assembly electorate of West Sydney on 18 February 1865 because John Darvall had been appointed Attorney General, and John Robertson had been appointed Secretary for Lands in the fourth Cowper ministry. Such ministerial by-elections were usually uncontested however on this occasion a poll was required in East Sydney (Charles Cowper), The Glebe (Thomas Smart) and West Sydney. Each minister was comfortably re-elected. Only The Paterson (William Arnold) was uncontested.

Daniel Dalgleish was a former member for West Sydney who was defeated at the election on 24 November 1864. He was then an unsuccessful candidate at the elections for The Glebe (29 November 1864), Goldfields South (10 January 1865), and The Glebe (17 February 1865). This was the final occasion on which he stood for parliament.

== Dates ==
| Date | Event |
|---|---|
| 3 February 1865 | Fourth Cowper ministry appointed. |
| 8 February 1865 | Writ of election issued by the Speaker of the Legislative Assembly. |
| 16 February 1865 | Nominations |
| 18 February 1865 | Polling day |
| 22 February 1865 | Return of writ |

== Result ==
1865 West Sydney by-election Saturday 18 February
| Candidate | Votes | % |
|---|---|---|
| John Robertson (re-elected 1) | 1,113 | 40.2 |
| John Darvall (re-elected 2) | 1,033 | 37.4 |
| Daniel Dalgleish | 620 | 22.4 |
| Total formal votes | 2,766 | 100.0 |
| Informal votes | 0 | 0.0 |
| Turnout | 1,383 | 18.7 (Note: Antony Green's estimate is based on based on each person voting for two candidates. If the 620 people who voted for Dalgleish had plumped for him, as claimed at the declaration of the poll, the turnout would have been around 1,733, 23%.) |

== See also ==
- Electoral results for the district of West Sydney
- List of New South Wales state by-elections
