= Municipality of The Glebe =

Former local government area in New South Wales, Australia

Municipality of The Glebe New South Wales
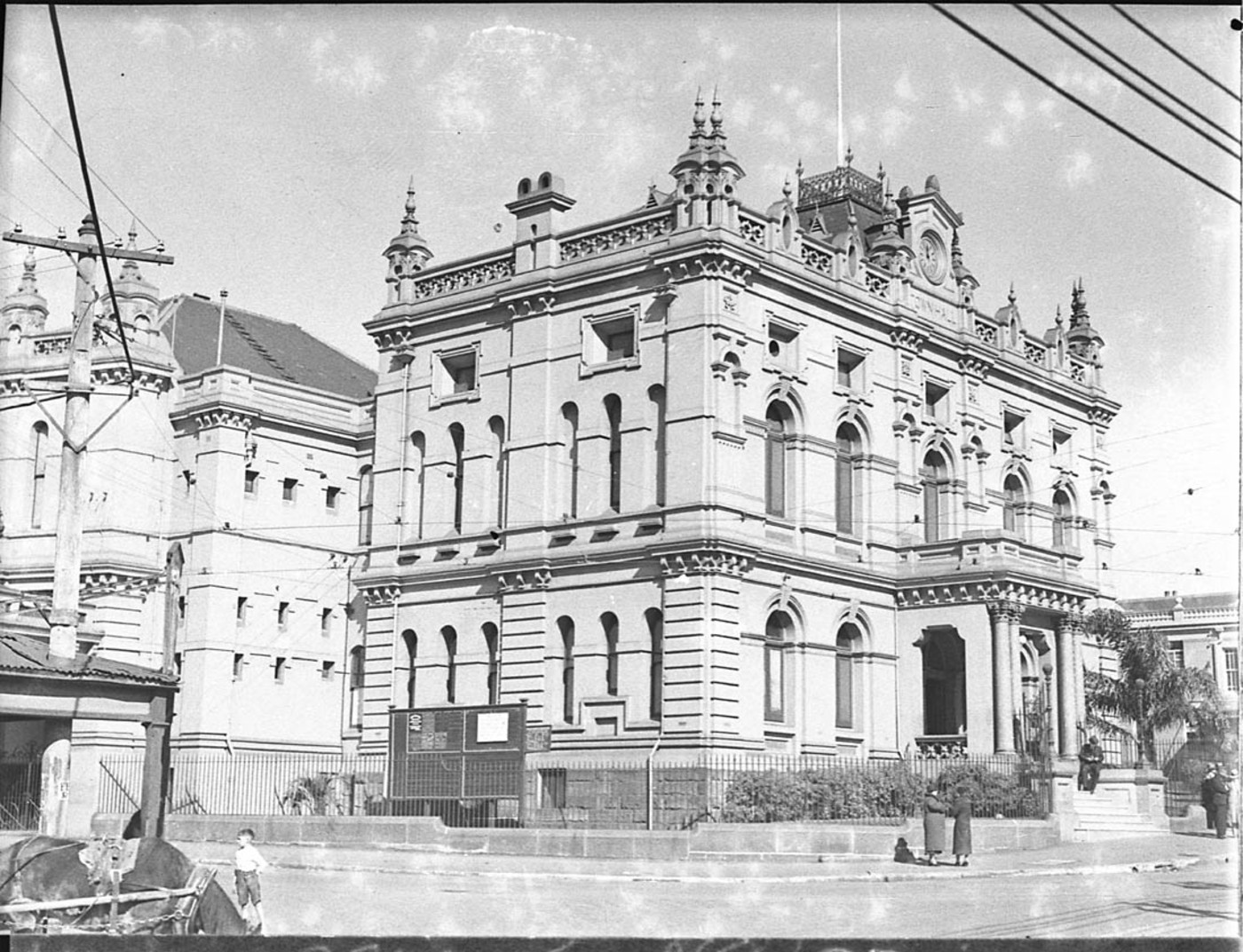
- Glebe Town Hall in 1935, photographed by Sam Hood.
- Population: 20,510 (1947 census)
  - Density: 10,300/km^{2} (27,000/sq mi)
- Established: 1 August 1859
- Abolished: 31 December 1948
- Area: 2 km^{2} (0.8 sq mi)
- Council seat: Glebe Town Hall
- Region: Inner West
- Parish: Petersham
LGAs around Municipality of The Glebe:
Rozelle Bay	Blackwattle Bay
Leichhardt/ Annandale	Municipality of The Glebe	Sydney
	Camperdown

The Municipality of The Glebe was a local government area of Sydney, New South Wales, Australia. The municipality was proclaimed on 1 August 1859 and, with an area of 2 square kilometres, included the modern suburbs of Glebe and Forest Lodge. The council was amalgamated with the City of Sydney to the east with the passing of the Local Government (Areas) Act 1948, although parts of the former council area were transferred in 1967 to the Municipality of Leichhardt to the west (now the Inner West Council).

== Council history and location ==
The municipality was proclaimed by the Governor of New South Wales, Sir William Denison, on 1 August 1859, with the boundaries described in the Government Gazette as "bounded on the east by Bay-street, northerly, from the Parramatta Road, at the junction of the Newtown Road, to Blackwattle Swamp Cove on the north and west by the waters of Port Jackson, and by Johnston's Creek, upwards, to the Orphan School Creek; on the south by that creek, upwards, to the Parramatta Road; and by that road, easterly, to Bay-street aforesaid." On 16 August 1859, a further proclamation, following a petition, divided the municipality into three wards: Outer Glebe Ward, Inner Glebe Ward and Bishopthorpe Ward.

The Council first met on 1 September 1859, when the first chairman was elected, George Wigram Allen, who would be elected a further 17 times. Other early aldermen of the council included architects Edmund Blacket (1859–1870) and George Allen Mansfield (1866–1877), and the future NSW Premier George Dibbs (1870–1871). The first council meetings were held in the long room of a local hotel, but a few months later moved to a house which Chairman Allen had placed at their disposal until a purpose-built cottage was rented for the purposes of Municipal Chambers. In July 1879 the council approved a 5000-pound design for a new town hall located at the junction of St John's Road, Mount Vernon Street and Lodge Street, designed by Ambrose Thornley. The Town Hall, surmounted by a clock which had been donated by Sir George Wigram Allen, was completed and opened on 24 June 1880 by Mayor Dunn.

Following the enactment of the Municipalities Act, 1867, the title of chairman was renamed "Mayor" and the council became known as the Borough of The Glebe (From 28 December 1906, following the passing of the Local Government Act, 1906, the council was again renamed as the "Municipality of The Glebe"). On 17 January 1871, a further proclamation created a fourth ward, Forest Lodge Ward, in the south-west, with each ward now returning three aldermen each. With the bankruptcy and dire financial straits of its southern neighbour, Camperdown Council was moved to the position of amalgamating the council with one or several of its neighbours. A resolution passed by Camperdown on 27 October 1903 invited Glebe and Newtown councils to discussions over such a proposal, which was firmly rejected by The Glebe. Camperdown eventually merged with the City of Sydney in December 1908.

By 1925 the Glebe council was controlled by Labor representatives with 11 Labor Aldermen elected to council, and William Walsh became Glebe's first Labor Mayor. On 31 May 1939, the Minister for Local Government, Eric Spooner, recommended to the Governor, Lord Wakehurst, that Glebe Council be dismissed and replaced by an Administrator, Barton Hopetoun Nolan, the Inspector of Local Government Accounts for the Department of Local Government, whose report on the accounts of the council had unveiled significant misappropriation and corruption. Elections intended for February 1940 were postponed by the Minister for Local Government, Lewis Martin, and were eventually held on 8 December 1940, with five Australian Labor Party (Non-Communist) candidates elected aldermen.

By the end of the Second World War, the NSW Government had realised that its ideas of infrastructure expansion could not be effected by the present system of the patchwork of small municipal councils across Sydney and the Minister for Local Government, Joseph Cahill, following the recommendations of the 1945–46 Clancy Royal Commission on Local Government Boundaries, passed a bill in 1948 that abolished a significant number of those councils. Under the Local Government (Areas) Act 1948, The Glebe Municipal Council was merged with the larger neighbouring City of Sydney which was located immediately to the east and south, becoming the Glebe Ward, returning two aldermen.

== Mayors ==
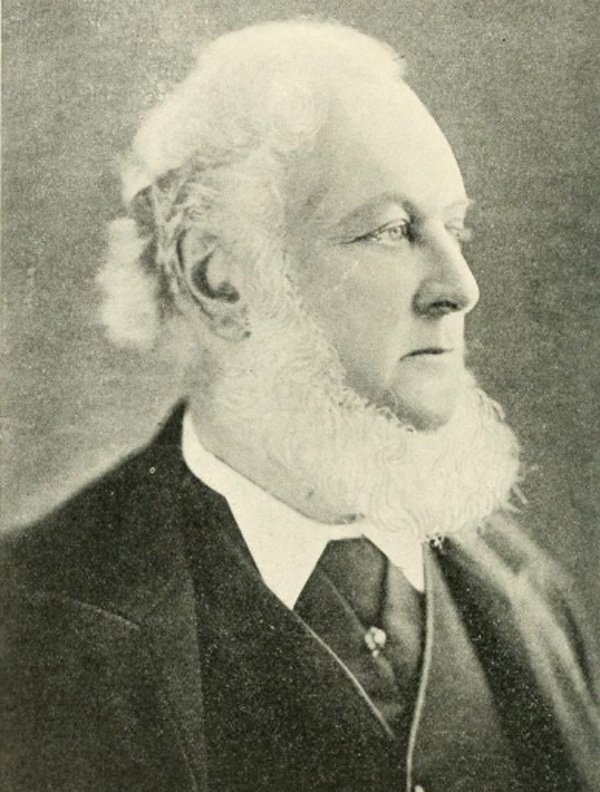
Sir George Wigram Allen (1824–1885), first chairman and Mayor 1859–1878, Speaker of the Legislative Assembly 1875–1882.

Officeholder	Party	Title	Term start	Term end	Notes
George Allen	n/a	Chairman	1 September 1859	23 December 1867	
George Allen	n/a	Mayor	23 December 1867	15 February 1878	
John Henry Seamer	n/a	Mayor	15 February 1878	13 February 1879	
William Cary	n/a	Mayor	13 February 1879	9 February 1880	
Thomas John Dunn	n/a	Mayor	9 February 1880	12 February 1881	
Charles Field	n/a	Mayor	12 February 1881	10 February 1882	
Michael Chapman	n/a	Mayor	10 February 1882	13 February 1885	
Thomas John Dunn	n/a	Mayor	13 February 1885	17 February 1888	
Percy Charles Lucas	n/a	Mayor	17 February 1888	10 February 1890	
George Frederick Burcher	n/a	Mayor	10 February 1890	10 February 1891	
Percy Charles Lucas	n/a	Mayor	10 February 1891	13 February 1892	
William George Yeates	n/a	Mayor	13 February 1892	16 February 1893	
Percy Charles Lucas	n/a	Mayor	16 February 1893	12 February 1894	
William Alston Hutchinson	n/a	Mayor	12 February 1894	13 February 1896	
William Cary	n/a	Mayor	13 February 1896	11 February 1898	
Percy Charles Lucas	n/a	Mayor	11 February 1898	7 February 1901	
Henry Macnamara	n/a	Mayor	7 February 1901	5 February 1903	
Thomas Nosworthy	n/a	Mayor	5 February 1903	15 February 1906	
Percy Charles Lucas	n/a	Mayor	15 February 1906	13 February 1908	
Stanley Cole	n/a	Mayor	13 February 1908	6 February 1911	
Frederick Lewis Artlett	n/a	Mayor	6 February 1911	8 February 1915	
Stanley Cole	n/a	Mayor	8 February 1915	10 February 1916	
Ralph Willis Stone	n/a	Mayor	10 February 1916	19 February 1918	
Henry Punter	n/a	Mayor	19 February 1918	10 February 1919	
Finlay Elgin Munro	n/a	Mayor	10 February 1919	6 February 1920	
Stanley Cole	n/a	Mayor	6 February 1920	31 December 1922	
William Thomas Tate	n/a	Mayor	31 December 1922	13 December 1923	
Henry Punter	n/a	Mayor	13 December 1923	11 December 1924	
Percy Charles Lucas	n/a	Mayor	11 December 1924	10 December 1925	
William Joseph Walsh	Labor	Mayor	10 December 1925	5 December 1929	
Francis Thomas Dick	Labor	Mayor	5 December 1929	4 December 1930	
Albert James Ward	Labor	Mayor	4 December 1930	7 January 1932	
James Diver	Labor	Mayor	7 January 1932	1 December 1932	
Bob Gorman	Labor	Mayor	1 December 1932	7 December 1933	
Matthew Aloysius Fitzpatrick	Labor	Mayor	7 December 1933	7 December 1934	
James Joseph Lahiff		Mayor	7 December 1934	5 December 1935	
Stephen Patrick McCormack	Labor	Mayor	5 December 1935	10 December 1936	
Horace Foley	Labor	Mayor	10 December 1936	December 1938	
Stephen Patrick McCormack	Industrial Labor	Mayor	December 1938	31 May 1939	
Barton Hopetoun Nolan	n/a	Administrator	31 May 1939	8 December 1940	
Harold Charles Splatt	Labor (N-C)	Mayor	12 December 1940	December 1942	
Colin Campbell Colbourne	Labor (N-C)	Mayor	December 1942	December 1943	
William Joseph Beasley	Labor	Mayor	December 1943	December 1944	
Colin Edgar Elphick	Labor	Mayor	December 1944	December 1945	
Albert Henry Lawson	Labor	Mayor	December 1945	December 1946	
Cornelius O'Neill	Labor	Mayor	December 1946	December 1947	
Michael Ward	Labor	Mayor	December 1947	31 December 1948	

== Town Clerks ==
Town Clerk	Term start	Term end	Notes
Henry Saunderson	October 1859	July 1860	
Charles Storey	July 1860	November 1862	
Henry Colley	November 1862	26 March 1870	
William de Burgh Hocter	26 March 1870	8 February 1879	
Thomas Law (acting)	8 February 1879	24 February 1879	
D. J. O'Connor	24 February 1879	17 January 1884	
Thomas Denby Glasscock	17 January 1884	6 July 1933	
George Henry West	6 July 1933	August 1940	
W. E. Taylor	August 1940	July 1946	
Frank O'Grady	July 1946	31 December 1948	
