= Hay Standard =

Australian Newspaper

The Hay Standard was an English language newspaper published in Hay, New South Wales, from 1871 to 1900. It was the first newspaper published at Hay.

The initial full title of the newspaper was The Hay Standard and Advertiser for Balranald, Wentworth, Maude, Booligal, Wilcannia, Menindie, Bourke, &c., reflecting its wide catchment area incorporating townships and districts in a broad arc to the north and west of Hay on the Murrumbidgee, Lachlan and Darling rivers.

== History ==
The first issue of The Hay Standard was on 9 August 1871. The earliest extant issue is No. 13, published on 1 November 1871. The newspaper was initially published every Wednesday and could be subscribed to for 7s 6d each quarter (postage added). It contained agricultural information, news and advertisements for goods and services in the area. The newspaper included correspondents’ reports from outlying districts.

The first publisher of The Hay Standard was John Andrew (1828 - 1902) who printed and edited the newspaper for the proprietors D. G. Jones and Co., owners of The Pastoral Times newspaper in nearby Deniliquin (of which Andrew had been the publisher for the previous eight years ). Caroline Levinia Jones was proprietor for four years after her husband died in 1876. In the early years of its existence the office of The Hay Standard was located at the Government Wharf at Hay. John Andrew was replaced by Frederick Jellieffe Steane in June 1873 when Andrew briefly left Hay. John Andrew returned by the end of that year to start The Riverine Grazier newspaper at Hay in opposition to The Hay Standard.

By January 1880 Frederick Steane had moved the Standard to an office in Lachlan Street. In May 1881 Steane was replaced by Richard Chambers as publisher. By January 1890 the newspaper was being published twice weekly, on Wednesdays and Saturdays, and the name had been shortened to The Hay Standard.

Richard Chambers continued as publisher until October 1900 when he was replaced by John Andrew (the founding publisher in the early 1870s), who renamed the paper The Hay Standard, Riverina Times and Journal of Water Conservation and relocated the office to Alma Street. The last issue of The Hay Standard was published on Wednesday, 28 November 1900; the very next day John Andrew published the first issue of a new newspaper, with the re-arranged title Riverina Times, Hay Standard and Journal of Water Conservation. Even though this newspaper carried the main title of Riverina Times, Andrew obviously considered it a continuation of the newspaper he had started in 1871 as the new publication carried a banner reading "Thirtieth Year of Publication".

== Digitisation ==
Extant issues of the newspaper have been digitised as part of the Australian Newspapers Digitisation Program project hosted by the National Library of Australia.

== See also ==
- List of newspapers in New South Wales
- List of newspapers in Australia

== Bibliography ==
- Holden, W Sprague 1961, Australia goes to press, Melbourne University Press, Melbourne.
- Mayer, Henry 1964, The press in Australia, Lansdowne Press, Melbourne.
- Walker, R B 1976, The newspaper press in New South Wales 1803-1920, Sydney University Press, Sydney.
