= Carruthers ministry =

New South Wales government ministry led by Joseph Carruthers

- 32nd Cabinet of the State of New South Wales

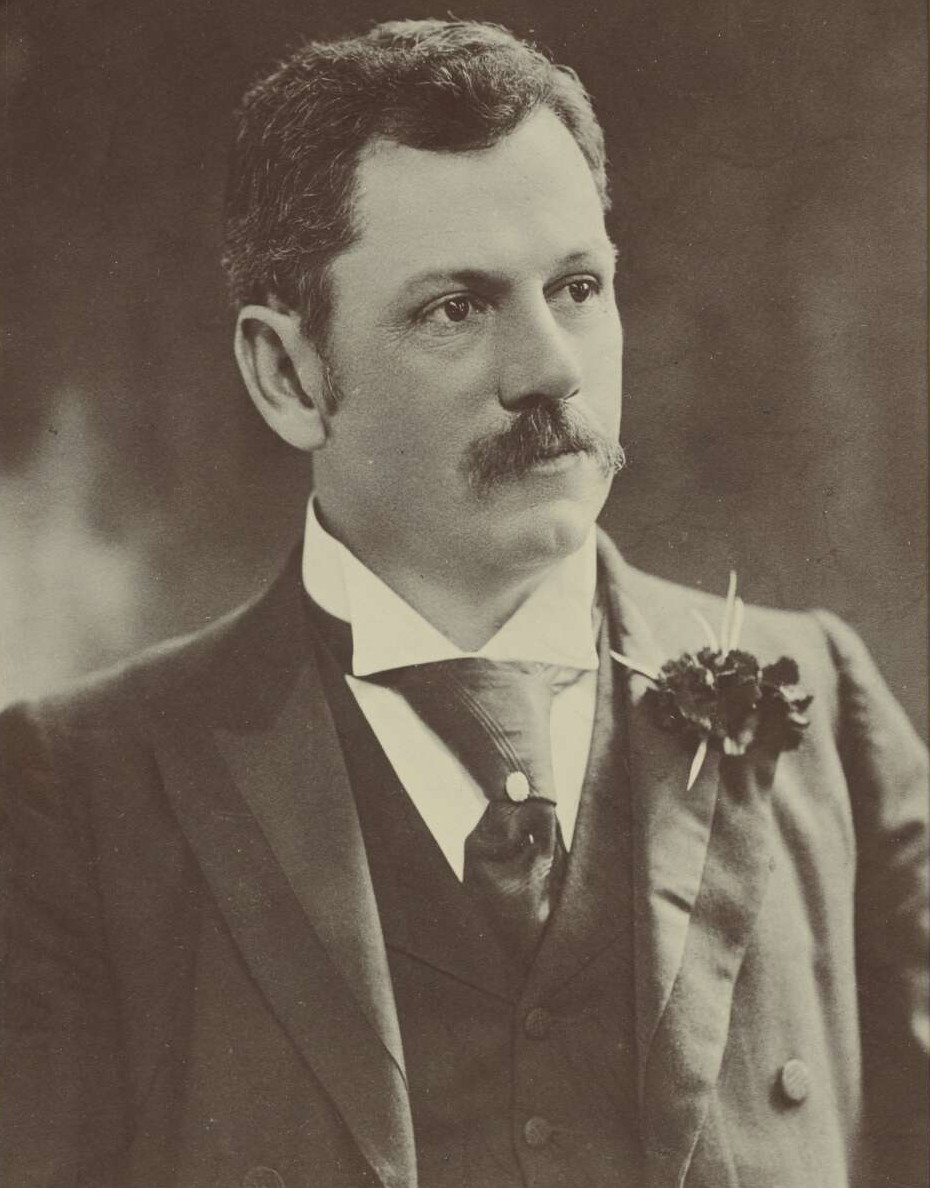
- Premier Joseph Carruthers
- Date formed: 29 August 1904
- Date dissolved: 20 October 1910

People and organisations
- Monarch: Edward VII / George V
- Governor: Sir Harry Rawson
- Premier: Joseph Carruthers
- No. of ministers: 10
- Member party: Liberal Reform
- Status in legislature: Hung parliament
- Opposition party: Labour
- Opposition leader: James McGowen

History
- Election: 1904 New South Wales election
- Outgoing election: 1907 New South Wales election
- Predecessor: Waddell ministry
- Successor: Wade ministry

The Carruthers ministry was the 32nd ministry of the New South Wales Government, and was led by the 16th Premier, Joseph Carruthers. The title of Premier was widely used to refer to the Leader of Government, but was not a formal position in the government until 1920. Instead the Premier was appointed to another portfolio, usually Colonial Secretary. In this case, Carruthers chose the portfolio of Treasurer.

Carruthers was elected to the New South Wales Legislative Assembly at the 1887 election, serving until 1908. As the Commonwealth Parliament was forming, many leading figures sought federal seats. Carruthers became leader of the New South Wales opposition Liberal and Reform Association, the successor to the Free Trade Party, and led the Liberal-Reform alliance to government at the 1904 state election.

Under the constitution, ministers in the Legislative Assembly had their seats vacated on appointment and were required to regain them in an election. Such ministerial by-elections were usually uncontested and on this occasion by-elections were required in The Glebe (James Hogue) Bingara (Samuel Moore) and Tenterfield (Charles Lee) and all were comfortably re-elected. The other four ministers were re-elected unopposed. This was the final occasion in which ministers had to contest by-elections as the constitution was amended in 1906.

In 1907 the Progressive Party had negotiated a coalition agreement with the Liberal Reform Party however this was rejected by a vote of parliamentary members. The party leader Thomas Waddell resigned and joined the Liberal Reform Party, and a week later was appointed Chief Secretary in the ministry.

The ministry covers the period from 29 August 1904 until 1 October 1907, when Carruthers resigned in favour of Charles Wade in a new alliance between the Association and what remained of the Progressive Party.

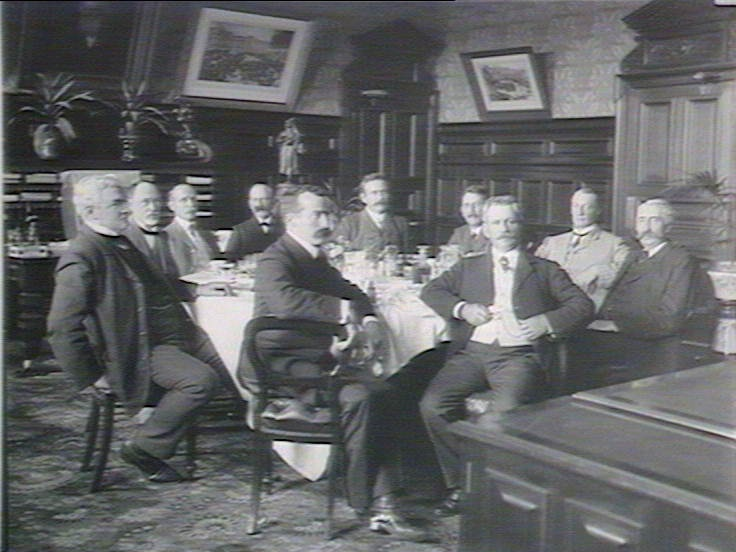

== Composition of ministry ==
| Portfolio | Minister | Party | Term start | Term end | Term length |
|---|---|---|---|---|---|
| Premier; Treasurer; Collector of Internal Revenue | Joseph Carruthers | Liberal Reform | 29 August 1904 | 1 October 1907 | 3 years, 33 days |
| Secretary for Lands | James Ashton | Liberal Reform | 29 August 1904 | 1 October 1907 | 3 years, 33 days |
| Chief Secretary; Registrar of Records | James Hogue | Liberal Reform | 29 August 1904 | 13 May 1907 | 2 years, 257 days |
| Chief Secretary; Registrar of Records | Thomas Waddell | Liberal Reform | 14 May 1907 | 1 October 1907 | 140 days |
| Attorney General; Minister of Justice | Charles Wade KC | Liberal Reform | 29 August 1904 | 1 October 1907 | 3 years, 33 days |
| Secretary for Public Works | Charles Lee | Liberal Reform | 29 August 1904 | 1 October 1907 | 3 years, 33 days |
| Minister of Public Instruction; Minister for Labour and Industry | Broughton O'Conor | Liberal Reform | 29 August 1904 | 13 May 1907 | 2 years, 257 days |
| Minister of Public Instruction; Minister for Labour and Industry | James Hogue | Liberal Reform | 14 May 1907 | 1 October 1907 | 140 days |
| Secretary for Mines and Agriculture | Samuel Moore | Liberal Reform | 29 August 1904 | 1 October 1907 | 3 years, 33 days |
| Vice-President of the Executive Council; Representative of the Government in Legislative Council | John Hughes MLC | Liberal Reform | 29 August 1904 | 1 October 1907 | 3 years, 33 days |
| Minister without portfolio assisting the Treasurer | William Dick | Liberal Reform | 29 August 1904 | 1 October 1907 | 3 years, 33 days |
| Minister without portfolio | James Brunker | Liberal Reform | 12 June 1905 | 1 October 1907 | 2 years, 111 days |

Ministers were members of the Legislative Assembly unless otherwise noted.

== See also ==
  - Members of Legislative Assembly
  - (1904-1907)
  - Members of Legislative Council
  - (1904–1907)

| Preceded by Waddell ministry | Carruthers ministry 1904–1907 | Succeeded by Wade ministry |
