= Riverina Times =

Australian newspaper

The Riverina Times is an English language newspaper published in Hay, New South Wales, from November 1900 until 1902. The full title of the newspaper was Riverina Times, Hay Standard and Journal of Water Conservation. It was published by John Andrew (1828 - 1902), a publisher and newspaper-proprietor at Deniliquin and Hay from the 1860s. The Riverina Times was essentially a continuation of The Hay Standard, first published at Hay in 1871.

== History ==
In October 1900 John Andrew purchased The Hay Standard (of which he had been founding publisher in the early 1870s); he renamed the newspaper The Hay Standard, Riverina Times and Journal of Water Conservation and relocated the office from Lachlan Street to Alma Street. The last issue of The Hay Standard was published on Wednesday, 28 November 1900; the very next day John Andrew published the first issue of his new publication, with the re-arranged title Riverina Times, Hay Standard and Journal of Water Conservation. Even though this newspaper carried the main title of Riverina Times, Andrew obviously considered it a continuation of the newspaper he had started in 1871 as the new publication carried a banner reading "Thirtieth Year of Publication". John Andrew included the following information in the first issue of the Riverina Times:

TO ADVERTISERS. Ladies and Gentlemen. — Having recently purchased the plant and goodwill of the "Hay Standard" newspaper and added to its name the Riverina Times with the determination to make it a thoroughly good readable family paper for the whole of Riverina, and having purchased gas engine and first class Wharfedale Double Royal printing machine, capable of making 1,600 impressions per hour (which are now being fitted up) I will be in a position to supply the public with latest news on a broad sheet at the low charge of 10s per year if paid in advance, or 12s if booked, and hope to secure a very extensive list of subscribers.

John Andrew died in March 1902 at his residence ‘Tioma’, in Alma Street, Hay. The Riverina Times was purchased after Andrew's death and in October 1902 was incorporated into The Riverine Grazier.

== Digitisation ==
Extant issues of the newspaper have been digitized as part of the Australian Newspapers Digitisation Program project hosted by the National Library of Australia.

== See also ==
- List of newspapers in New South Wales
- List of newspapers in Australia

== Bibliography ==
- Holden, W Sprague 1961, Australia goes to press, Melbourne University Press, Melbourne.
- Mayer, Henry 1964, The press in Australia, Lansdowne Press, Melbourne.
- Walker, R B 1976, The newspaper press in New South Wales 1803–1920, Sydney University Press, Sydney.
