= William Wilkinson (New South Wales politician) =

Australian politician (1858–1946)

William Camac Wilkinson (1858 – 3 February 1946) was an Australian politician.

He was born at Enfield, the son of a judge. He attended the University of Sydney, receiving a Bachelor of Arts in 1877, and the University of London, receiving a Bachelor of Medicine in 1882 and a Doctorate of Medicine in 1884; he also studied at Strassbourg and Vienna. He was twice married, first to Jessie Cruickshank and then to Dulcie Fry. On returning to Sydney he worked as a specialist in throat, ear and skin ailments. In 1885 he was elected to the New South Wales Legislative Assembly for Glebe, serving until 1889. A lecturer in medicine at Sydney University from 1901, he was a Sydney City Councillor from 1902 to 1904. In 1910 he moved to London and set up practice in Harley Street. He died in London in 1946.

New South Wales Legislative Assembly
Preceded by Michael Chapman	Member for Glebe; 1885–1889; Served alongside: John Meeks/Michael Chapman	Succeeded by Bruce Smith
