= Bruce Smith (Australian politician) =

Australian politician (1851–1937)

The Honourable Bruce Smith KC
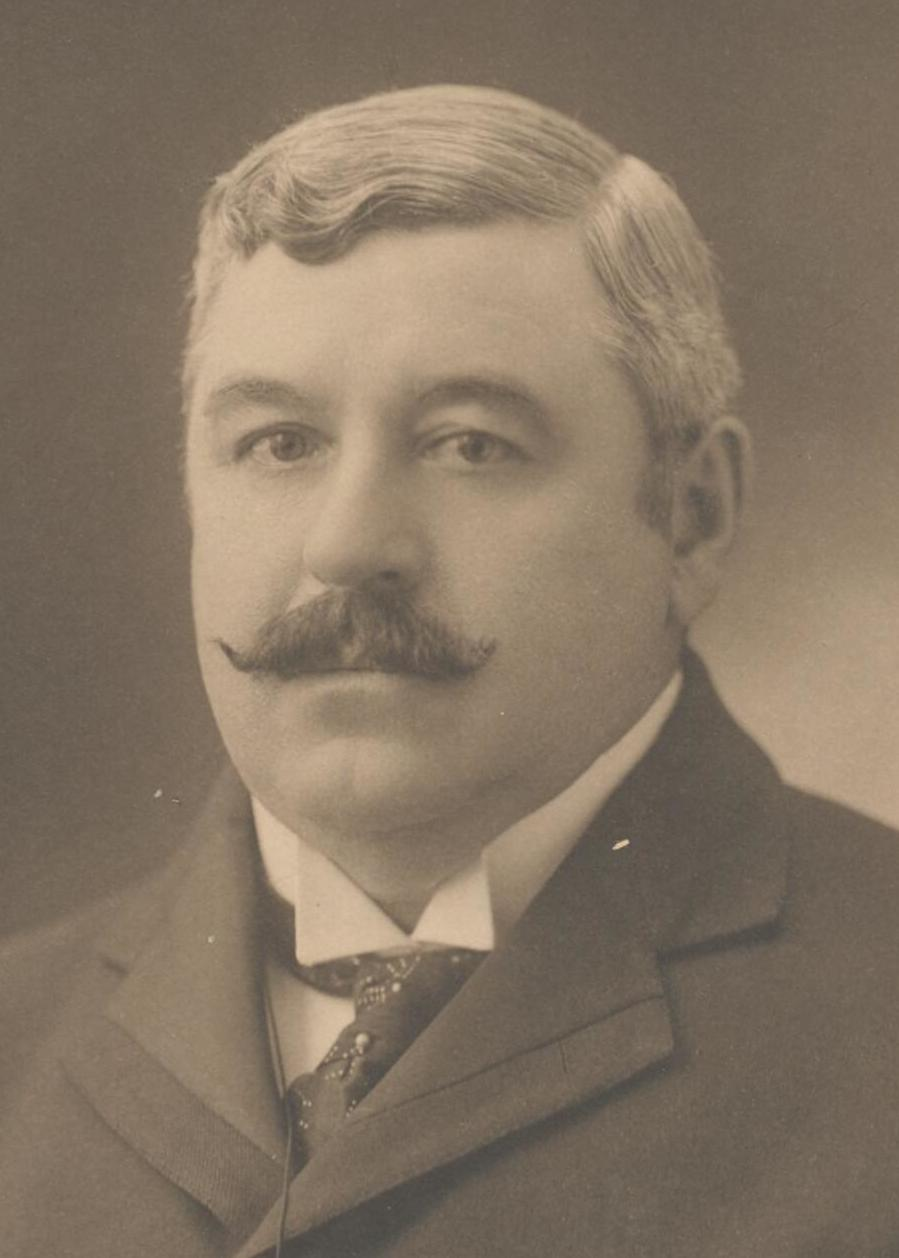

Member of the Australian Parliament for Parkes
- In office 29 March 1901 – 13 December 1919
- Preceded by: New seat
- Succeeded by: Charles Marr

Personal details
- Born: 28 June 1851 Rotherhithe, England
- Died: 14 August 1937 (aged 86) Bowral, New South Wales
- Party: Free Trade (1901–06); Anti-Socialist (1906–09); Liberal (1909–17); Nationalist (1917–19); Independent (1919)
- Relatives: Edmund Smith (brother)
- Occupation: Barrister

Arthur Bruce Smith KC (28 June 1851 – 14 August 1937), commonly referred to as A. Bruce Smith, was a long serving Australian politician and leading political opponent of the White Australia policy. He has been described as the most prominent Australian advocate for classical liberalism in the late nineteenth and early twentieth century.

== Early life ==
Born in Rotherhithe, Surrey, England, Smith was the fifth of seven sons of wealthy ship owner William Howard Smith and his second wife Agnes. One brother, Edmund (1847–1914), would serve in the Victorian Legislative Council from 1901 to 1903. The family immigrated to Melbourne in 1854 where Smith was educated at Wesley College and studied law at the University of Melbourne before leaving for England where he was called to the Bar in 1877.

== Colonial politics ==
Returning to Melbourne the next year, Smith was admitted to the Victorian Bar and on 15 January 1879, married Sara Jane Creswell, who bore him four sons and three daughters. Developing an interest in politics, Smith unsuccessfully stood for the Victorian electoral district of Emerald Hill in February 1880, before moving to Sydney in 1881, where he won a Legislative Assembly by-election for Gundagai in 1882.

Resigning from parliament in April 1884, Smith returned to Melbourne to run his father's business, WM Howard Smith and Sons Ltd. In March 1885 Smith founded the Victorian Employers' Union, serving as its inaugural president until 1887, and the Victorian Board of Conciliation. Union leaders favourably commented upon his willingness to work with unions to achieve consensus, an attitude missing in fellow employers.

In 1887, Smith published Liberty and Liberalism, a defence of classical Adam Smith liberalism in politics and economics and an attack against what he considered the increasing interference by the state. Additionally, Smith later wrote books on the Constitution of Australia, the dangers of socialism and a volume of verse.

After an argument with his father in December 1887, Smith sold all his shares in Howard Smith to his brother Edmund Smith and resigned from the board. Disinherited by his father, Smith returned to Sydney to continue his career as a barrister and founded the New South Wales Employers' Union.

Elected as the member for Glebe in the New South Wales Legislative Assembly in February 1889, Smith was almost immediately promoted by Premier Henry Parkes to Secretary for Public Works, and later, Treasurer. Smith proved to be a hard working minister but abrasive figure, frequently clashing with Parkes and accused of threatening to "shoot down" striking maritime workers "like bloody dogs". He did not seek re-election at the 1894 election. He never held ministerial office again.

In March 1897 Smith stood unsuccessfully as a candidate in the election of delegates to the Australasian Federal Convention, receiving little more than half the votes of William McMillan the candidate most resembling Smith in political position. Smith griped that the weaker of the ten successful candidates were, variously, 'a nuisance', 'unstable' and 'stupid'. Nevertheless, Smith ardently embraced the constitution the Convention produced, and stumped for it in the subsequent referendums. In 1898 Smith unsuccessfully contested Glebe for the National Federal Party and served as a member of the party's Federal Executive finance committee and as editor of their newspaper United Australia from 1900 to 1902.

== Federal politics ==
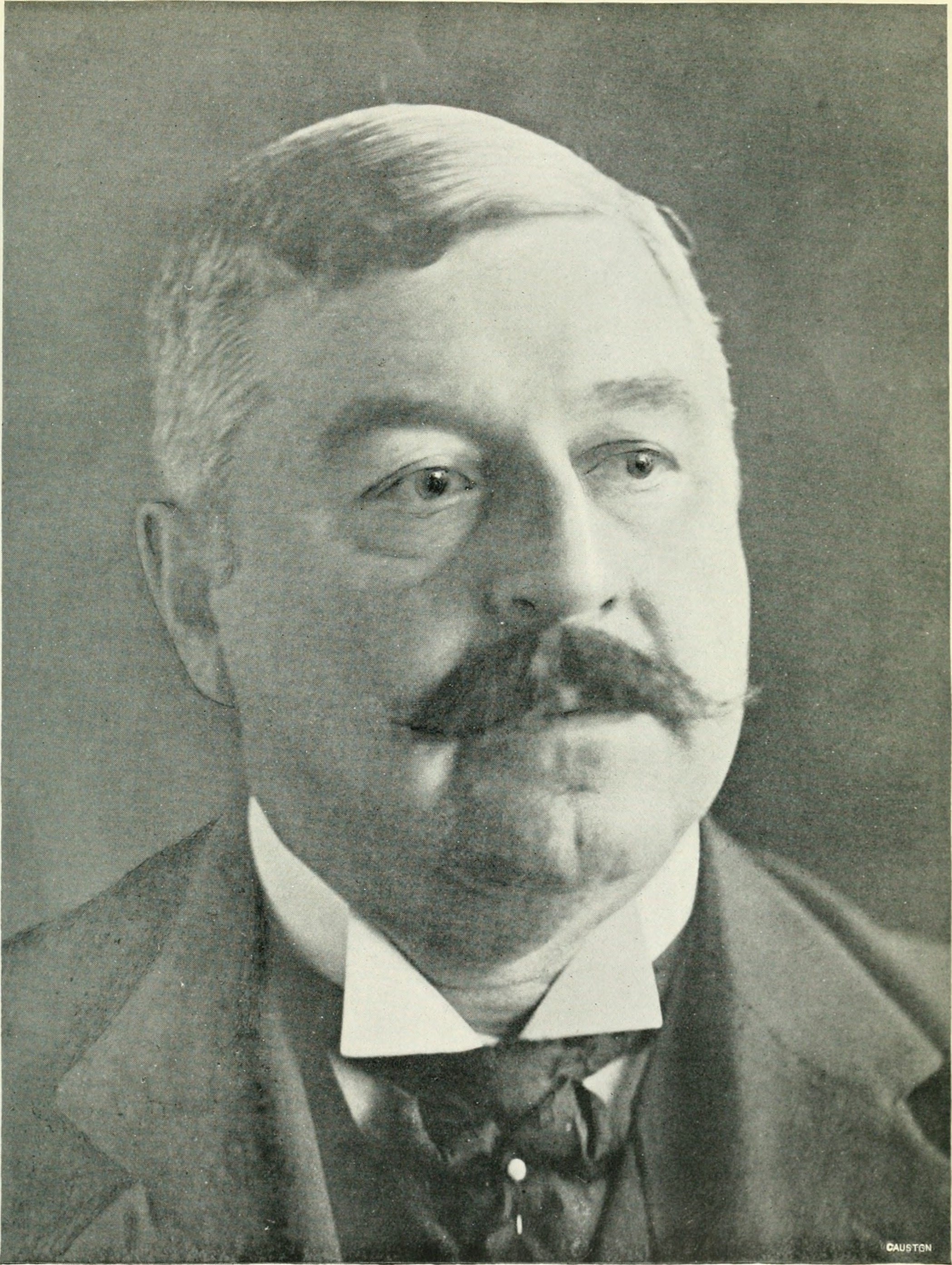
Smith c. 1903

Following the Federation of Australia on 1 January 1901, Smith successfully contested the newly created federal Division of Parkes at the inaugural Australian federal election as a Free Trade Party representative. He campaigned strongly against the idea of restricting non-white immigration, believing it to be racial discrimination; in doing so, Smith was the only candidate to oppose all of what would become the White Australia Policy (Andrew Fisher argued that any Kanaka who had converted to Christianity and married should be allowed to remain in Australia).

In parliament, Smith often clashed with his Free Trade colleagues, particularly party leader George Reid, over his refusal to toe the party line. He opposed the deportation of Kanakas, tariffs, social welfare provisions and "meddling legislation". He believed that 'if the issue [of Federation] were to come again before the people it would be negatived by the people'. Smith was a strong supporter of the women's movement and was known as parliament's preeminent political economist and one of its finest debaters.

While a member of parliament, Smith continued to act as a barrister and was made a King's Counsel in 1904. Additionally, he served on numerous commercial boards, including as a director of the Colonial Mutual Life Assurance Society Ltd, and held senior positions with community organisations such as New South Wales president of the British Empire League in Australia and state president of the Association for the Protection of Native Races.

Smith lost Nationalist preselection at the 1919 election and was defeated as an independent candidate, having spent almost all his period in federal parliament in opposition. He was offered the role of Speaker of the Australian House of Representatives twice but declined in order to concentrate on other matters.

== Post-political life ==
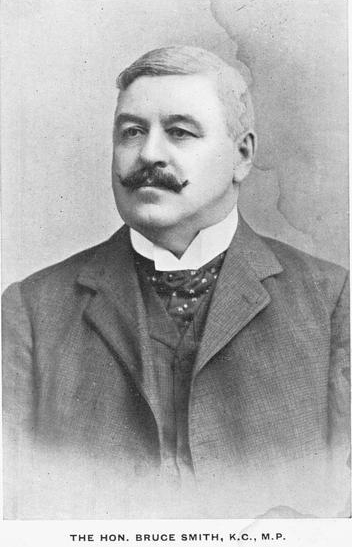
Smith c. 1910

In 1925 he retired to Bowral, New South Wales, where he died in 1937. Survived by two daughters and a son, Smith was buried beside his wife in the Bowral Church of England cemetery.

Smith was considered an anachronism by the end of his political career but his stature has been revived in recent years, thanks in part to the recent republishing of Liberty and Liberalism. Prominent historian Keith Windschuttle refers to Smith as "one of the outstanding intellectuals of Australian history", adding "were anyone to write a proper history of ideas in Australia, Smith should figure prominently". According to Geoffrey Bolton, Smith was once "dismissed as a spokesman for employers who wanted to introduce cheap non-European labour into White Australia", but by the late 20th century had been rehabilitated as "a tolerant multiculturalist ahead of his time".

Parliament of New South Wales
Political offices
Preceded by James Fletcher	Secretary for Public Works; 1889 – 1891	Succeeded by James Young
Preceded by William McMillan	Colonial Treasurer; August – October 1891	Succeeded by John See
New South Wales Legislative Assembly
Preceded by William Forster	Member for Gundagai; 1882–1884	Succeeded by James Watson
Preceded by William Wilkinson	Member for Glebe; 1889–1894; Served alongside: Chapman, Houghton	Succeeded by James Hogue
Parliament of Australia
New division	Member for Parkes; 1901–1919	Succeeded by Charles Marr
