= Thomas Houghton (politician) =

Australian politician

Thomas John Houghton
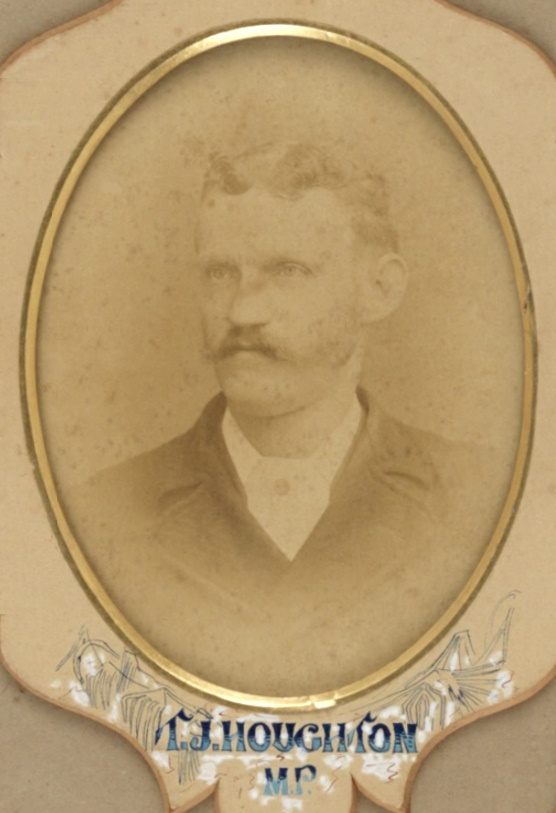

Member of the New South Wales Parliament for Electoral district of Glebe
- In office 17 June 1891 – 25 June 1894 Serving with Bruce Smith
- Preceded by: Michael Chapman
- Succeeded by: James Hogue

Personal details
- Born: 24 December 1861 Liverpool, England
- Died: 30 August 1933 (aged 71) Artarmon, New South Wales
- Party: Labor Party
- Occupation: Printworker

Thomas John Houghton (24 December 1861 – 30 August 1933) was an English-born Australian politician, union official and a printer and publisher.

Houghton emigrated to Australia with his family as a young child. He served an indentured apprenticeship in the printing industry with a local newspaper at Grafton, the beginning for him of a close association with the Northern Rivers region of New South Wales. He was active in the typographical union during employment at the Government Printing Office. In 1889 he was appointed permanent secretary of the Sydney Trades and Labour Council and had an important involvement in the setting up of the Labor Electoral League and its district branches in preparation for selecting labour candidates for the 1891 general election in New South Wales.

In June 1891 Houghton was amongst the initial group of Labor Party members elected to the New South Wales Legislative Assembly, in his case representing the Glebe electorate. At the 1894 election, with the Labour Electoral League insisting on absolute solidarity with caucus decisions, Houghton's bid for re-election as an independent labour candidate was unsuccessful. He maintained links with the labour movement, forming a company that published The Australian Workman newspaper. From the late 1890s until his death in 1933, Houghton worked within the printing industry, as an employee and as a printer and publisher in his own right, at a number of locations in eastern Australia.

== Biography ==
=== Early years ===
Thomas John Houghton was born on 24 December 1861 at Liverpool in county Lancashire, England, the son of George Houghton and Frances (née Fairclough). His father was a painter and glazier.^{[A]}

The Houghton family emigrated to New South Wales aboard the ship Parramatta, probably arriving at Sydney in December 1866. Thomas' sister died during the voyage.^{[B]} Both parents of the family died after a "few years" in Australia. Young Thomas probably attended school in Sydney. He had only "a moderate amount of schooling, but made very good use of his opportunities in this direction".

Houghton left school in about 1874, aged thirteen. After working as an office boy "in one of the city institutions", in July 1875 he was apprenticed to the printing trade on the staff of the Grafton local newspaper, The Clarence and Richmond Examiner, owned by James D. Gray and James McNaughton. Houghton spent the next six years as an indentured apprentice at Grafton, in the Northern Rivers region of New South Wales, "to learn the trade and business of a printer".

In March 1877 Houghton appeared on summons at the Grafton Police to answer a complaint by A. Helmich, who stated he had been subjected to "much annoyance and insult" in the public street by Houghton and others, culminating in "the use of filthy and disgusting language". Houghton, a youth of fifteen, "had nothing to say in mitigation". He was fined five shillings, or 24 hours' imprisonment, and "warned that a second offence of the kind would be severely punished". In October 1878 at the Grafton Police Court, Houghton and eight other "boys" were charged with "behaving in a riotous manner" in Queen Street. They had been engaged in an activity called "tin kettling", carried out by "beating on kerosene tins and cans, and hooting". Most of the young men received fines, though Houghton "was admonished by the Bench and discharged".

By early 1881 Houghton was actively involved with an amateur dramatic club at Grafton.

A Grafton newspaper made the following comments about Houghton as a youthful resident of the township (in response to a November 1891 visit to Grafton by Houghton, who had been recently elected to the Legislative Assembly): "From his boyhood's days – as we were informed by one who knew him then – his mind has had an anarchical twist; a kind of unrest, impatient of restraint". The writer added a reproach: "It would be well if he would educate himself to restrain this propensity".

=== Government Printing Office ===
From about August 1881, after completion of his apprenticeship indentures, Houghton was employed as a compositor at the Government Printing Office (GPO) in Sydney, where he remained until 1889. He joined the New South Wales Typographical Association soon after being employed and shortly afterwards was appointed as a workplace 'collector' for the union. At the GPO Houghton was engaged in the printing of Hansard, the transcripts of New South Wales parliamentary debates.^{[C]}

Thomas John Houghton and Catherina Suzanne Kritsch were married on 31 December 1884 at Grafton. The couple had three children born from 1885 to 1896.^{[D]}

In February 1887 Houghton received a promotion at the Government Printing Office. At about the same time he was elected by his fellow employees as 'father' to the supernumerary compositors' 'chapel'. In the print industry a 'chapel' referred to a collective of unionised print workers within a workplace. The 'father' of the 'chapel' referred to the senior union representative at the printing establishment. Houghton later served in other administrative positions within the unionised 'chapel' at the GPO. He was also active on the annual picnic committee.

In July 1887 a "fairly-attended" meeting of the employees of the Government Printing Office agreed to inaugurate a dramatic and musical club in connection with their workplace. Houghton spoke at the meeting, briefly stating the objectives of the proposed club, and was one of those appointed to the committee to draft club rules. Houghton was elected as the first secretary of the Government Printing Office's Dramatic and Musical Society, which "gained for itself the reputation of the premier institution of its kind in Sydney".

In about 1888 Houghton served on the board of management of the Typographical Association and on three occasions he was elected to represent the union at the Trades and Labor Council. He also represented the union on the Trades Hall and Eight-hour Demonstration Committee.

=== Trades and Labour Council ===
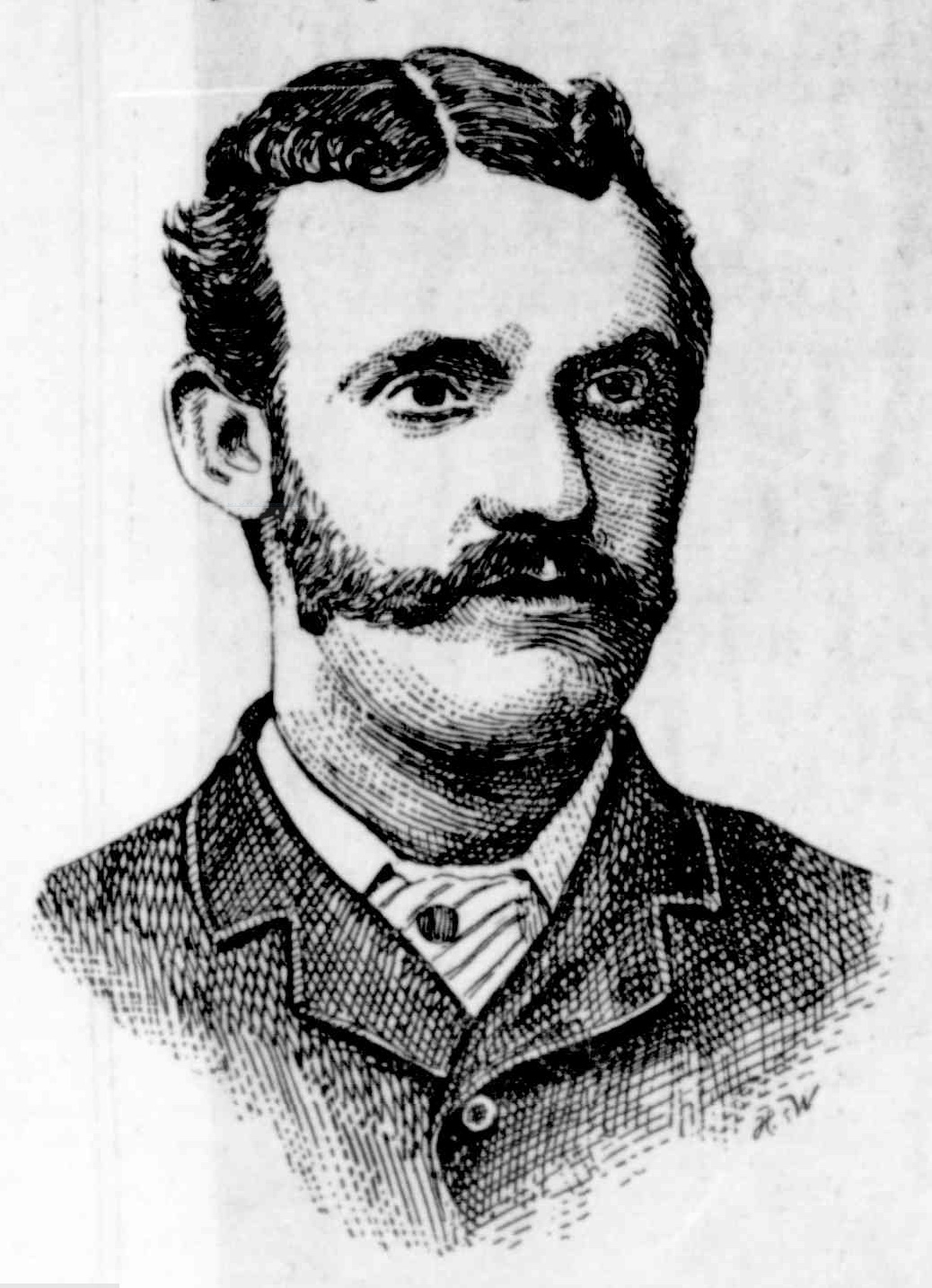
Illustration of T. J. Houghton, general secretary of the Sydney Trades and Labour Council (published on 21 September 1889).

In March 1889 Houghton was elected as the part-time general secretary of the Sydney Trades and Labor Council (TLC), on a salary of thirty pounds a year. In September that year he organised a mass public meeting in the Sydney Domain to raise funds to support striking London dock workers. In October 1889 Houghton submitted his resignation as secretary of the TLC "owing to [the] enormous increase in duties and failing health". He was persuaded to remain and given assistance to perform his duties. In December Houghton was appointed as the Council's first full-time general secretary. He was re-elected to the role on two subsequent occasions without opposition. Houghton represented the Sydney TLC at the Victorian Eight-hour anniversary celebration held in Melbourne last year, on the Intercolonial Labor Federation Conference, on the New South Wales' Labor Defence Committee at the Intercolonial Labor Congress held in Ballarat, at the western miners' demonstration, and on numerous deputations and conferences. Houghton was described as "the very model of a meticulous secretary".

In March 1890, in his role as secretary of the TLC, Houghton was involved in settling a dispute at Bathurst between a mill-owner named Crago, owner of the National Mills, and his unionised labour-force. Crago had dismissed those of his employees who had joined the recently-formed Mill Employees' Union, but he was eventually persuaded to reinstate the men. In June 1890 Houghton was elected president of the Sydney branch of the Mill Employees' Union. In August 1890, in a visit to Bathurst, Houghton convinced the proprietors of the local flour mills to employ only union labour.

The maritime dispute that began in August 1890 eventually involved ten unions in New South Wales, including the shearers union, and spread to unionists in three other colonies. The executive committee of the Sydney Trades and Labor Council was engaged full-time in the strike until it was called off in early November. Houghton was a member of the Labor Defence Council, which controlled the strike in New South Wales.

By the close of 1890 the Sydney TLC had decided to form a political organisation "with a view of securing better representation of Labor in Parliament and to effectively organise all that are favourable to the said object". In February 1891 a sub-committee of three, made up of Houghton, Francis Cotton and Robert Boxall, was appointed to "draft a scheme for government" by establishing district Labor Electoral Leagues that would select candidates in each electorate. They submitted their scheme for the organisation and government of Labor Electoral Leagues in March, which was debated, revised and adopted by the TLC.

=== Political career ===
The 1891 general election in New South Wales, held in June and early July 1891, saw the first electoral successes of the Labor Party (then known as the Labour Electoral League). Thomas Houghton was selected as a candidate to contest The Glebe electorate in the New South Wales Legislative Assembly. At that time The Glebe was a two-member electorate. Both sitting members, Michael Chapman and Bruce Smith, re-contested the election, each of them representing the Free Trade Party. The other nominees were two independent free trade candidates and a representative of the Protectionist Party. At the election held on 17 June 1891, Bruce Smith was re-elected and Houghton polled second, elected with 1,472 votes (just seven behind Smith). Houghton's fellow member for The Glebe electorate, Bruce Smith, was a member of Henry Parkes' ministry when he was re-elected in June 1891. He had been appointed secretary for public works in March 1889, though he was seen as an abrasive figure and often clashed with the premier. In August 1891 he was appointed as colonial treasurer, serving for only a few months until the government was defeated in parliament in October and Parkes resigned as premier and leader of the Free Trade Party.

After the election Houghton's views about the manner in which Labor members would operate in parliament was reported in The Daily Telegraph. He explained that the Labor Electoral League (LEL) members would "sit together on the cross-benches" and "on all questions embodied in the labor platform, we will vote in accordance with the decision of the majority of our party". In regard to the issue of free trade versus protectionism, he added: "On the fiscal question we will vote according to conviction untrammelled by the league". Houghton's assertion that Labor members would have a free vote on the fiscal issue was met with immediate resistance and he modified his stance soon afterwards by advocating that the Labor position should be determined by a future referendum. The newly-elected LEL members held their first caucus meeting before parliament was assembled, at which it was decided not to appoint a leader. A five-member managerial committee was formed instead, which included Houghton as secretary.^{[E]}

In September 1893 the Electoral Districts Commissioners presented their scheme of redistribution of seats under the new Electoral Act before the New South Wales Legislative Assembly. As part of the process, multi-member electorates were abolished and the electorates were realigned and in some cases renamed. The Glebe electorate became a single-member electorate and, after Bruce Smith decided not to re-contest the seat, Houghton became the only sitting member at the 1894 general election.

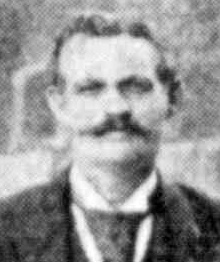
T. J. Houghton, photographed in January 1894 (detail from a group photograph).

In January 1894 an Intercolonial Labor Conference was held in Sydney, organised by the Trades and Labour Council (TLC) and attended by Labor party members of the New South Wales parliament and delegates from the other colonies. Divisions between the TLC and the Labor Electoral League (LEL) regarding 'solidarity' candidates and the Labor pledge were on full display, with reports that the LEL refused to recognise the conference "in any way", insisting that approved LEL candidates "will be run in every electorate, and that many of the present members will not be again selected". The Labor party went into the general election of July 1894 with divisions between and within the parliamentary organisation and extra-parliamentary sections such as the TLC. In an effort to support only 'solidarity' candidates the LEL central committee took an uncompromising stance by setting up new branches to replace any that supported candidates not prepared to sign the latest iteration of the Labor pledge. Three of the Labor members – Houghton, George Black and William Schey – were supported by the TLC despite each of them having refused to sign the LEL pledge. A motion was passed declaring them "friends of labour" and recommending to the LEL central committee that they should not be opposed. However, despite opposition from local LEL branches and adverse commentary in the labour press, the central executive committee persisted with its efforts to exclude 'bogus' candidates.

The election was held on 14 July 1894 and Houghton was opposed by five other candidates, representatives of the Protectionist and Free Trade parties, as well as the endorsed Labor Electoral League nominee, John Clune, and also two independent free trade candidates. Houghton was designated as an independent labour candidate for the election. He polled third with 19.8 percent of the vote, behind the Protectionist candidate and the Free Trade candidate, James Hogue, who was elected with 37.5 percent of the vote.

In December 1894 Houghton purchased the weekly The Australian Workman newspaper, a periodical that in 1891 had been the voice of the Trades and Labour Council. A report of the sale to Houghton commented: "The co-operative company were compelled to dispose of it through lack of support from the party whose interest it advocated". At the time Houghton was the proprietor and printer of a monthly journal The Commonwealth, described as an "organ of Federation". His printing business was known as T. J. Houghton & Co., located at the office of The Australian Workman at 70 Druitt Street in Sydney. In addition to his weekly and monthly publications, Houghton's company also printed The Freeman's Chronicle and The Socialist.

Houghton decided to contest the Sydney-Pyrmont electorate at the 1895 general election, a seat held by his former Labor colleague, Thomas Davis. Houghton was classified as an independent candidate, as were three others opposing the Labor League member. At the election held on 24 July 1895 Davis easily retained the seat. Houghton received only five votes.

In October 1897 The Australian Workman was purchased by and incorporated into The Worker newspaper, owned and published by the Australian Workers' Union. Houghton's services were retained as a printer. Soon afterwards Houghton and his family went to live in Grafton.

For the 1898 general election in New South Wales, Houghton was nominated as the Free Trade Party candidate to contest the Robertson electorate in the upper Hunter region. In the poll held on 27 July 1898 against the sitting member and National Federal Party candidate, Robert Fitzgerald, Houghton was unsuccessful, attracting 38.3 percent of the vote.

=== Post-parliamentary career ===
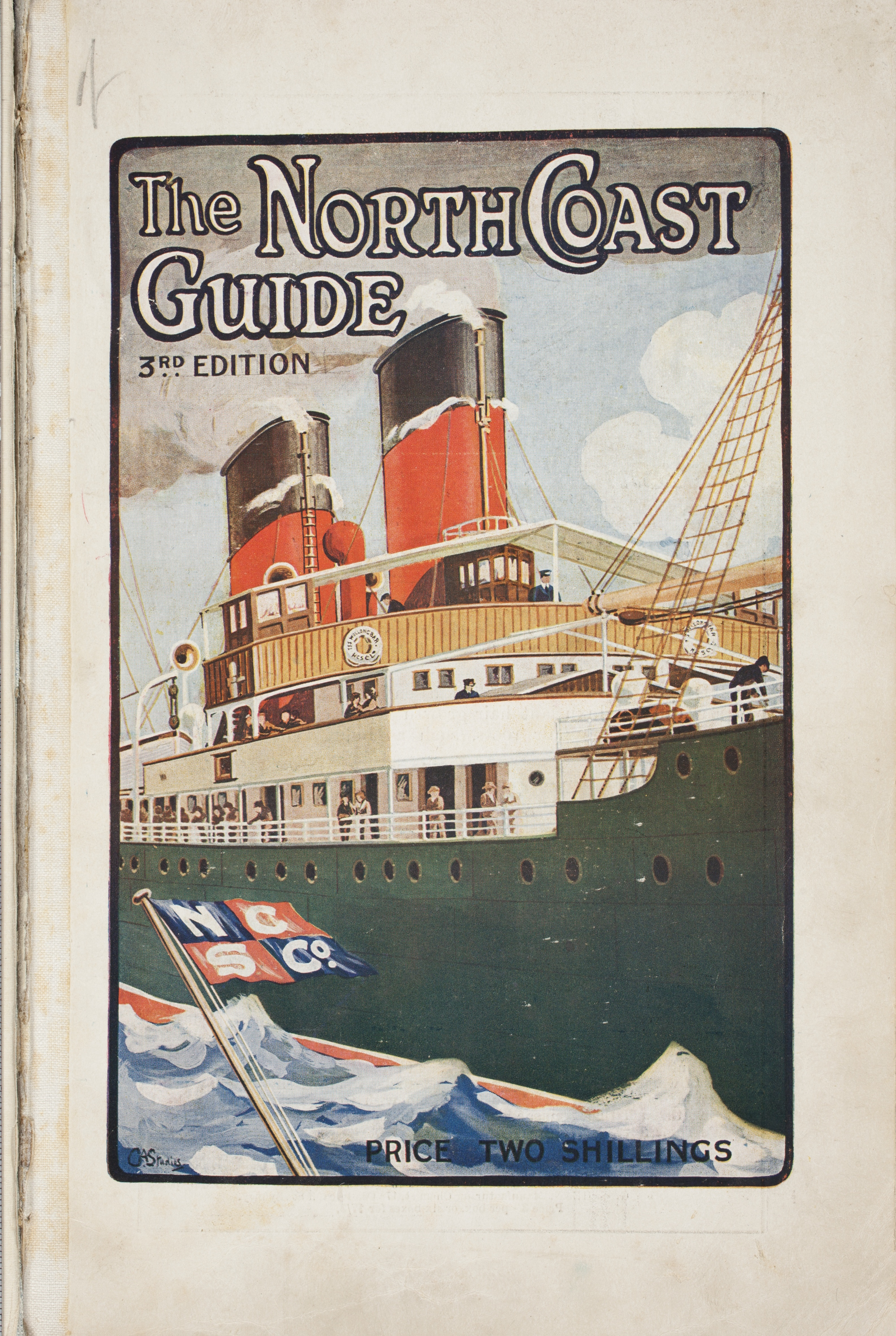
Front cover of The North Coast Guide (3rd edition), published by Thomas John Houghton for the North Coast Steam Navigation Co. in 1920.

In late 1898 Houghton took over the defunct South Grafton Leader and began publishing the weekly newspaper The Clarion. The newspaper, published at South Grafton, was described as being "vigorous in tone" and "run on rather sensational lines". To all appearances Houghton was the proprietor of The Clarion, as well as the printer, publisher and editor. However, as it was later revealed during a court case in December 1899, he was actually managing the newspaper for William J. Hawthorne. In November 1898 Houghton had wanted to purchase the plant from Hawthorne, at that time mayor of South Grafton, but they could not agree on a price. Instead, Hawthorne asked if they could "enter into an agreement... to start the paper and run it" on Hawthorne's behalf. The mayor asked Houghton "to put his imprint to the paper, advertise himself as proprietor, and do everything in his power to conceal [Hawthorne's] identity with the paper". Houghton continued under that agreement until the end of September 1899 when he relinquished his connection with the newspaper.

During the campaign and debates prior to the Federation of Australia, Houghton was an advocate for the "unpopular 'anti-Bill' side", arguing against the Commonwealth Constitution Bill on the basis that a new national parliament and defence force would lead to higher taxes and smaller states would be dominated by the wealthier and more populous New South Wales and Victoria.

In about June 1900 Houghton and his family re-located to Launceston in north-eastern Tasmania where he worked as the advertising manager of The Examiner newspaper. In about early 1902 he moved to Hobart and joined the staff of The Mercury as a "city traveller".

Houghton returned to Sydney in 1904. From about 1907 he compiled and published the Australian Manufacturers' Journal for the New South Wales Chamber of Manufacturers, work that he carried out for nine years.

In about 1916 Houghton worked for the Chamber of Commerce in Sydney and was responsible for the body's monthly journal Commerce.

In October 1920 the third edition of The North Coast Guide was released to the public, compiled, edited and published by Houghton for the North Coast Steam Navigation Company. Previous editions of the guide had been more modest publications. The third edition of The North Coast Guide was "profusely illustrated", such that one reviewer wrote that "in its pictorial wealth it could hardly be excelled". The publication featured suggested tours "by land and sea", including schedules and transport options, special articles on regional industries, information on townships, rivers and natural attractions and a history of the North Coast Steam Navigation Company.

In about December 1924 the New South Wales Railways issued a North Coast Railway Guide that had been compiled by T. J. Houghton, "modelled on the lines of European guide books". The guide was subsequently issued in updated editions. From about the start of 1928 Houghton was attached to the Publicity Department of the New South Wales Government Railways. As part of his job he engaged in tours of the railway system throughout the state.

=== Last years ===
In February 1929 Houghton suffered a "sudden seizure" at his son's home at Lindfield. He was taken to the 'Dalcross' private hospital at Killara and his condition was described as critical.

In his later years 'Tommy' Houghton was recognised identity about Sydney streets, "being an inveterate pedestrian" and known for his genial personality.

Thomas John Houghton died at Artarmon on 30 August 1933, aged 71.

== Notes ==
A.Biographies published in several newspapers state that Thomas John Houghton was born in Manchester, England.

B.Biographical references state that Thomas Houghton arrived in New South Wales aboard the Parramatta, aged four. There are two possible arrivals that fit this time-frame: (1) The ship Parramatta (Captain John Williams) departed from Plymouth on 15 September 1866 and arrived at Sydney on 14 December.; (2) The Parramatta departed from London via Plymouth on 2 August 1867 and arrived at Sydney on 25 November.

C.Houghton's first "frame mate" at the Government Printing Office was George Prendergast, who would later become one of the first Labor members of the Victorian Legislative Assembly and briefly premier of Victoria in 1924.

D.Catherina Suzanne Kritsch was the daughter of Sebastian Kritsch (1830-1897) and Ernestine (née Strauss), German immigrants who settled at Grafton in the late 1850s. Kritsch conducted a business as a wheelwright and coach-builder. He was the licensee of the European Hotel in Prince Street and served as an alderman of the township.

E.In addition to Houghton, the other members of the caucus managerial committee were John D. Fitzgerald, John G. Gough, James McGowen and William Sharp.

New South Wales Legislative Assembly
Preceded by Michael Chapman; Bruce Smith	Member for Glebe; 1891–1894; Served alongside: Bruce Smith	Succeeded by James Hogue
