= Deniliquin Pastoral Times =

- Owner: McPherson Media Group
- City: Deniliquin
- Country: Australia
- Readership: 59,050 monthly
- ISSN: 0814-0367
- Website: denipt.com.au

The Deniliquin Pastoral Times, previously published as the Pastoral Times and the Pastoral Times and Deniliquin Telegraph, is an English language newspaper published in Deniliquin, New South Wales, Australia.

== History ==
The paper has had a number of name changes since it was first published as the Pastoral Times and Deniliquin Telegraph on 26 May 1859. It was published under this name until 1861. From 1861 to 1995 it was published as the Pastoral times, before it merged with the Deniliquin Standard in 1995 to become the Deniliquin Pastoral Times. Caroline Levinia Jones was proprietor from 1876 to 1880. It is currently published by the McPherson Media Group.

Other local papers were absorbed by the Pastoral Times, including the Southern Courier in 1861, the Deniliquin Chronicle and Riverine Gazette in 1936, and the Deniliquin Independent in 1947.
