= Stanley Cole (politician) =

Australian politician (1860–1942)

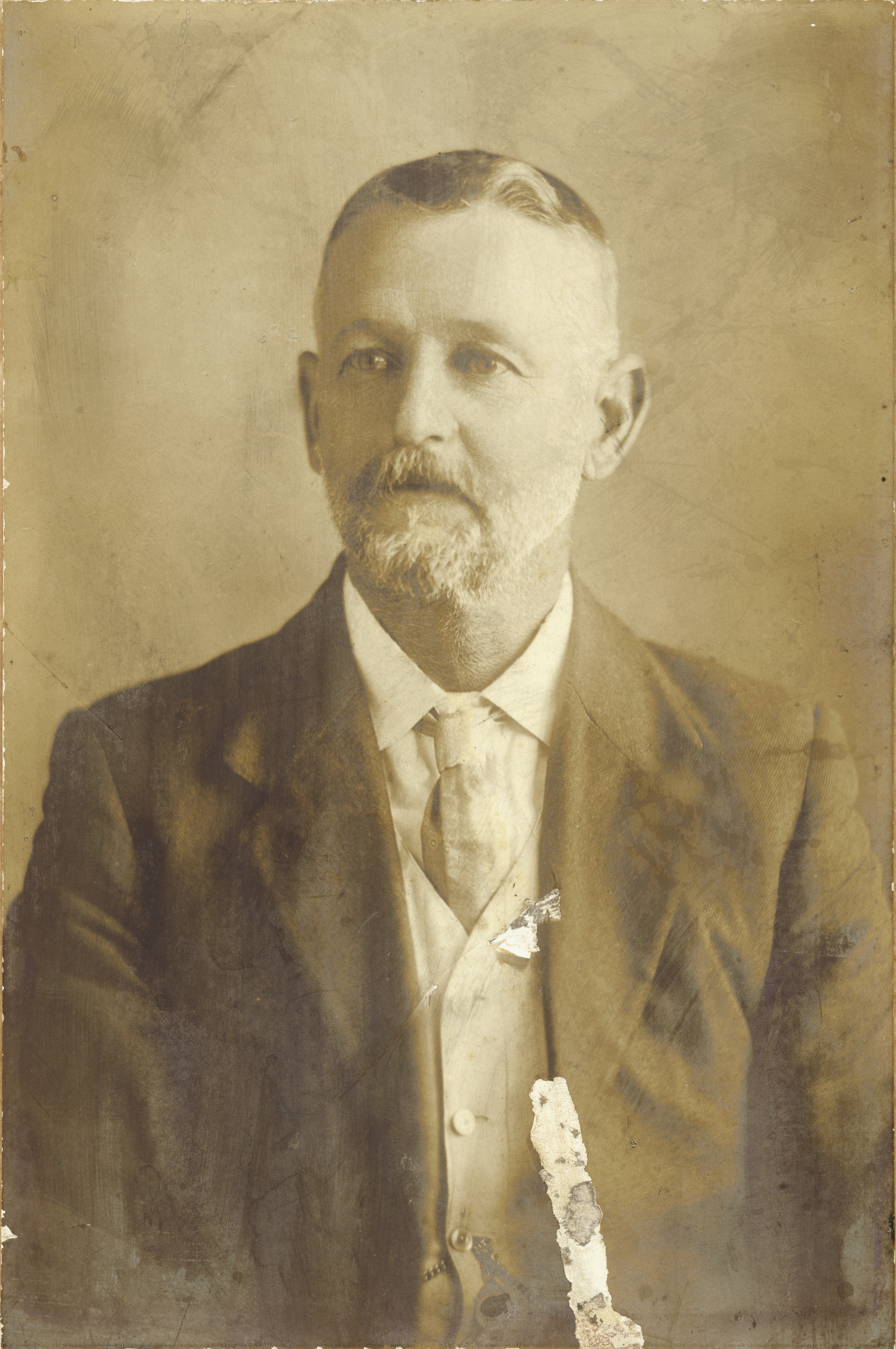
Stanley Llewellyn Cole (before 1920)

Stanley Llewellyn Cole (29 March 1860 – 17 November 1942) was an Australian politician.

Born in Gardiner, Victoria, to gardener George Cole and Emma Lewis Leek, he came to Sydney around 1878 and worked as a carrier, founding S. L. Cole & Son in 1883. On 29 March 1883 he married Isabella Jane Moorley, with whom he had five children. He served as an alderman of Glebe from 1902 to 1925 (mayor 1908–10, 1915, 1921–23), and as a Sydney City alderman from 1924 to 1927. From 1922 to 1924 he was President of the Local Government Association, having served as President of the Master Carriers' Association from 1921 to 1922. In 1927 Cole was appointed to the New South Wales Legislative Council as a Nationalist, serving until 1934 (later as a member of the United Australia Party). Cole died in Granville in 1942.

Civic offices
Preceded by Percy Charles Lucas	Mayor of The Glebe; 1908 – 1911	Succeeded by Frederick Lewis Artlett
Preceded by Frederick Lewis Artlett	Mayor of The Glebe; 1915 – 1916	Succeeded by Ralph Willis Stone
Preceded by Finlay Elgin Munro	Mayor of The Glebe; 1920 – 1922	Succeeded by William Thomas Tate
