= James Ashton (politician) =

Australian businessman (1864–1939)

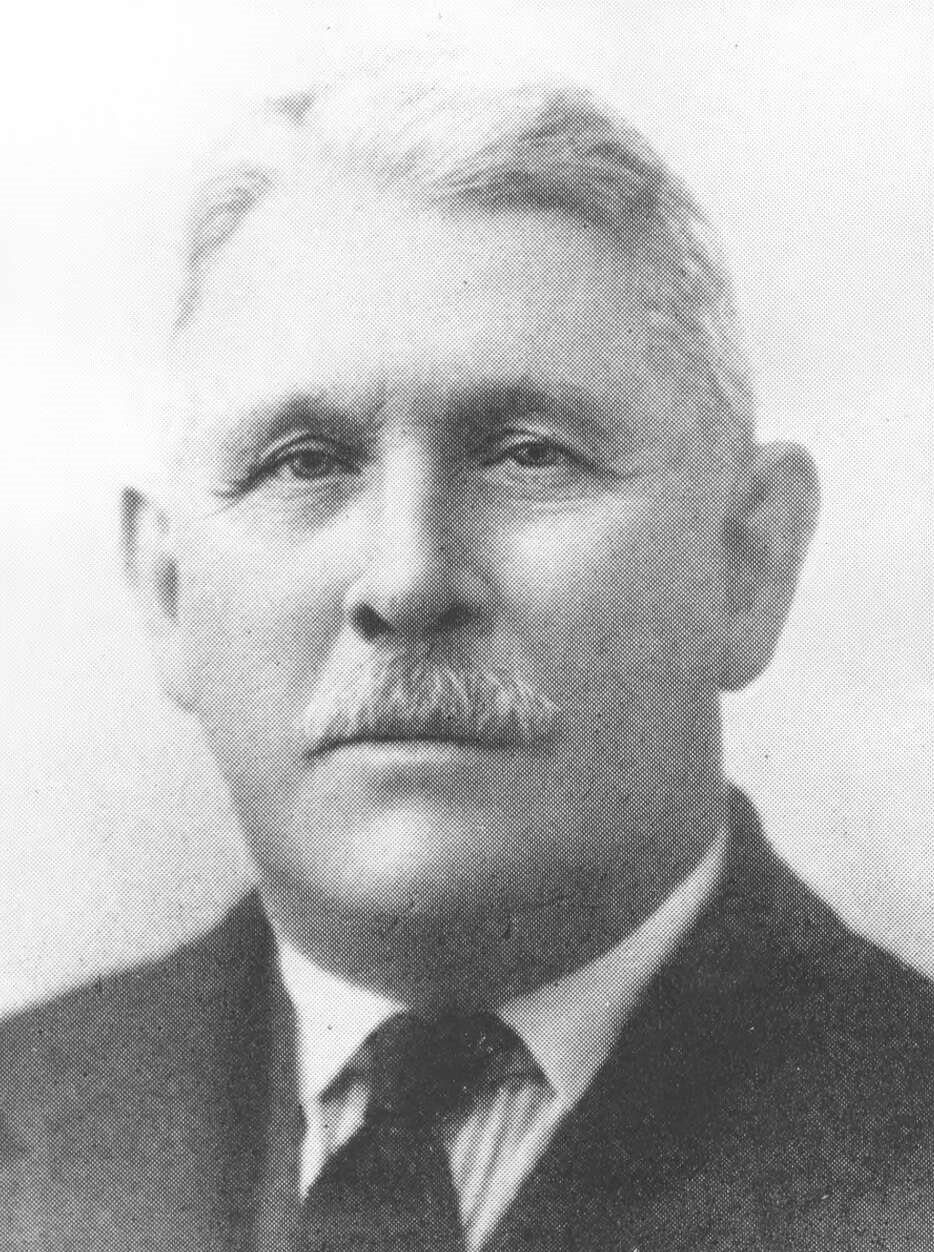

Member for Hay (NSW Legislative Assembly)
- In office 17 July 1894 – 8 July 1898

Member for Goulburn
- In office 27 July 1898 – 20 August 1907

Member of the NSW Legislative Council
- In office 2 October 1907 – 22 April 1934

Personal details
- Born: 8 May 1864 Ashby, Victoria, Australia
- Died: 6 August 1939 (aged 75) Double Bay, New South Wales, Australia
- Spouse: Helen Willis
- Parents: James Ashton (father); Mary Ann Kinsman (née Brittan) (mother)

James Ashton (8 May 1864 – 6 August 1939) was an Australian newspaperman, politician and businessman. As a politician he represented electorates in the New South Wales Legislative Assembly from 1894 to 1907 and later held a seat in the Legislative Council Ashton was Minister for Lands in the Carruthers government from 1904 to 1907.

From 1888 to 1892 Ashton was a joint-owner of The Riverine Grazier in Hay and sole proprietor of the Narrandera Argus in Narrandera from 1892 to 1896. He entered politics as the member for the Hay electorate in July 1894. After two terms he successfully contested the 1898 election for the Goulburn electorate, remaining the member until 1907. He was appointed to the Legislative Council in 1907, where he served until 1934. Ashton was a respected businessman who was a director of a number of influential companies.

== Biography ==
=== Early life ===
James Ashton was born on 8 May 1864 at Ashby, a suburb of Geelong, Victoria, the fifth child of James Ashton and Mary Ann Kinsman (née Brittan). James Ashton (senior) was a coffee-roaster by occupation.

In about 1871 the Ashton family moved to Sandhurst (Bendigo) where young James was educated at Sandhurst Grammar School for several years. In about 1874 Ashton's father's "business affairs went awry... during the gold rush era". James had to leave school, aged ten, and began working in a local printing office (receiving an initial wage of two shillings and sixpence for a 54-hour week).

In about 1877 the Ashton family moved to Echuca, on the Murray River bordering New South Wales. Ashton, then aged thirteen years, was employed by two of the local newspapers.

=== Hay ===
In the early 1880s Ashton came to Hay on the Murrumbidgee River, in the Riverina district of New South Wales, where he joined the staff of the Hay Standard as a compositor. At Hay Ashton met and became friends with John Johnston, a young man of his own age.^{[A]}

By 1884 Ashton had joined the clerical staff at the Hay office of Cramsie, Bowden and Co. who operated as general merchants, station suppliers and river steamboat owners, with headquarters at Balranald and branches in Sydney and Melbourne. After "acquiring a general knowledge of local grazing conditions and localities", Ashton was transferred to Melbourne towards the end of 1885. At about the same time his friend, John Johnston, also left the township after accepting a similar position in Sydney at the Equitable Assurance Company of New Zealand.

Ashton and Johnston kept in touch by correspondence and in early 1888 a business opportunity arose that enabled them both to return to Hay. The Hay newspaper The Riverine Grazier had been offered for sale by its founder and the two young men decided to form a partnership to purchase the journal. The ownership of the newspaper was transferred to the partnership of Johnston and Ashton for the sum of two thousand pounds on 1 April 1888, with Ashton taking on the role of editor and Johnston as business manager. In his final editorial in March 1888 the newspaper's founder, John Andrew, wrote that his "place is being taken by two thoroughly honorable, active, and capable young men".

During a period of growing prosperity of Hay township and the surrounding district, as editor of the Riverine Grazier Ashton took every opportunity to advocate for the causes of free trade, land law reform and federation of the Australian colonies.

In 1892 Ashton and Johnston decided to purchase The Narandera Argus, the local newspaper at Narrandera on the Murrumbidgee River upstream from Hay, which had become available for sale. In August 1892 it was announced that the partnership between John Johnston and James Ashton was "dissolved by mutual consent", a decision allowing Johnston to run the Riverina Grazier at Hay and Ashton to separately conduct the business of The Narandera Argus. In a published letter Ashton wrote that he had severed his connection with The Grazier "with deep regret", explaining: "The step is of my own choice, and is taken in obedience to a desire to keep 'moving along'".

=== Narrandera ===
In August 1892 Ashton went to live at Narrandera.

In 1893 the Parliamentary Electorates and Elections Act was passed which reduced future representation in the New South Wales Legislative Assembly to 125 single-member electorates. The two-member electorate of Balranald was to be replaced by the single-member electoral district of Hay. Robert B. Wilkinson, one of the members for Balranald and a free-trade supporter, announced his intention to resign at the next election, which prompted Ashton to nominate as a free-trade candidate for the new constituency. He began his bid for election by delivering a series of public addresses on land law reform, which he afterwards distributed to electors in a pamphlet titled 'The Great Land Question'. At the New South Wales election held in July 1894 Ashton stood as a free-trade supporter against four other candidates and was elected with 37.8 percent of the vote, defeating a protectionist candidate, James Newton, who had previously represented the district as one of the members for the Balranald electorate.

After the government's land and income tax assessment bill was blocked in the New South Wales Legislative Council the premier and leader of the Free Trade Party, George Reid, called an election on a program seeking affirmation of the rejected financial bill and Upper House reform. At the subsequent election held in July 1895 Ashton was re-elected with a majority vote of 61.3 percent, his only opponent being the protectionist James Newton.

In July 1896 Ashton sold The Narandera Argus to J. P. Brosnan. Ashton left Narrandera after the change of ownership, explaining that "he was relinquishing his connection with the Argus in order to give closer attention to other affairs, including his political duties".

=== Politics ===
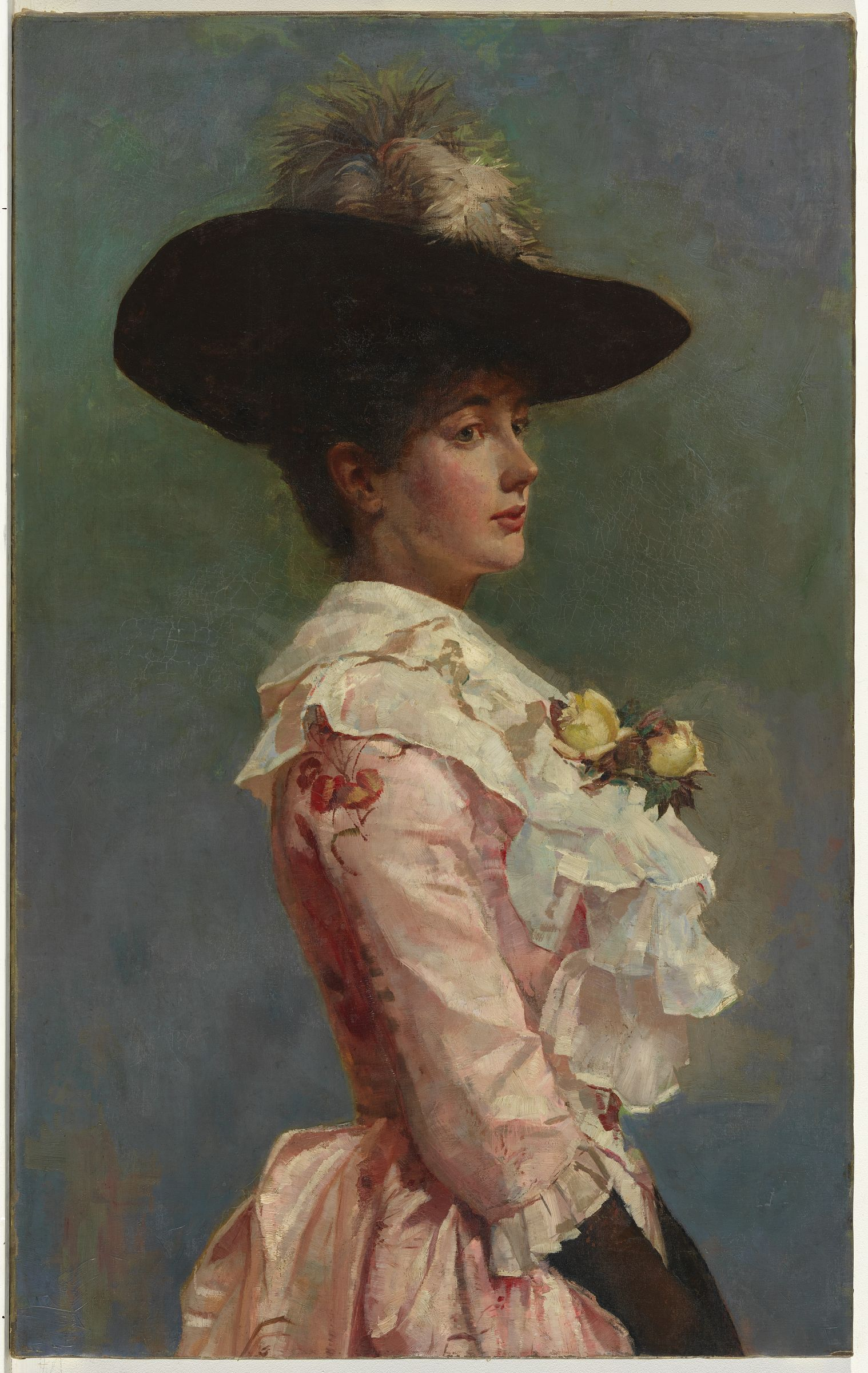
'Spring (Miss Helen Willis)' by Julian Ashton, painted in about 1889.^{[B]}

Ashton had been a strong advocate for the federation of the Australian colonies in his editorial columns beginning in the 1880s. On the eve of the Federation referendum in June 1898 the editor of the Riverine Grazier wrote that Ashton's "persistent advocacy has played no small part in creating the federal sentiment now so strong in this district". While Ashton supported federation, he opposed the convention bill, particularly the proposal for equal representation of the States in the Senate (which he thought should be proportional). Despite Ashton's opposition, the proposed Federal constitution was overwhelmingly supported in his electorate. The result for the Hay electorate in the Federation referendum was 740 'yes' votes and 176 'no' votes.

Acknowledging the views on Federation of the Hay electorate differed from his own, Ashton decided to contest the seat of Goulburn at the New South Wales election of July 1898. He was elected as its representative as a member of the Liberal and Reform Party with a majority vote of 62.3 percent.

On 6 March 1899 James Ashton married Helen Willis at Sutton Forest. The wedding was officiated by the bride's father, Rev. Robert Willis, and was described as "quite original in its simplicity". The couple had four sons, born in the period September 1899 to November 1909.

In December 1900 Ashton was the subject of criticism in a Hay newspaper for having expressed views in parliament (described as "pro-Boer utterances") in opposition to sending Australian troops to South Africa in support of the British Empire in its conflict with the two Boer republics. In a speech in October 1899 he had described the Second Boer War was being "chiefly made by that party amongst whom Mr. Rhodes exercises a controlling influence" and described the conflict as "a wrongful war" and "the wickedest war of modern times". At the time Ashton's speech was reported as: "He took the side of the Boers, but he never forgot that he is a British subject". In the strongly worded editorial of December 1900 Ashton's views were compared unfavourably with mainstream expressions of loyalty and patriotism, summarised as "helping the Mother country in her hour of need".

Ashton was unsuccessful as the Free Trade candidate for the federal seat of Riverina in the first election for the Legislative Assembly of the Australian parliament in March 1901. He received 46.5 percent of the vote against the Protectionist candidate John Chanter. The Sydney Morning Herald attributed Ashton's failure to win the seat of Riverina to his previous opposition to aspects of the Federal constitution.

Ashton re-contested the seat of Goulburn at the New South Wales election of July 1901 and was elected with a majority vote of 63.1 percent. During his time in the New South Wales parliament Ashton began to study law. He passed his final examination in 1902 "but delayed entering at the Bar, because he had a lucrative connection as a land agent". In 1903 James and Helen Ashton moved into 'Tueila', their waterfront home at Double Bay, and lived out their lives.

Ashton sought re-election for the seat of Goulburn at the New South Wales election of August 1904 and was elected with a majority vote of 56.2 percent. On 29 August 1904 he was appointed Secretary for Lands in the formation of the Carruthers government. Under the State constitution at that time newly appointed ministers from the Legislative Assembly had their seats vacated and were required to successfully contest the election before taking up their appointments. Ashton was elected as the only candidate for the seat of Goulburn in the by-election held in September 1904, one of four new ministers re-elected unopposed.

During his tenure as lands minister Ashton was required to deal with allegations of bribery made against his predecessor, former minister Paddy Crick. In May 1905 Justice William Owen was appointed to conduct a Royal Commission to investigate the administration of the Lands Department. A year later, in an interim report, the Royal Commission concluded that Crick had received corrupt payments and recommended that the department's administration should be conducted by a non-political Board of Commissioners. Crick was charged, but the jury could not agree on a verdict and the former minister was ultimately expelled from parliament. Ashton attempted to implement the appointment of a Board of Commissioners, but the bill eventually lapsed.

In January 1907 it was reported in the press that Ashton "will not seek re-election in the next Parliament". By March 1907 he announced that he would be retiring "from active politics". Ashton continued to serve as Minister for Lands until the parliament was dissolved in August 1907 and did not contest the following election. In September 1907 Ashton was appointed to a seat in the Legislative Council and subsequently appointed as an "honorary minister" without portfolio in the ministry under the Premier Charles Wade, who formed a government after the resignation of Joseph Carruthers.

In December 1908 Ashton took on the role of acting-Premier, during which period he "suspended his private business" as "the legal advocate for land owners and land companies". Ashton resigned as 'honorary minister' with effect on 25 June 1909, "owing to the pressure of private business". He continued to serve on the Legislative Council until April 1934, when the council was reformed by members indirectly elected by the Parliament.

=== Other interests and later life ===
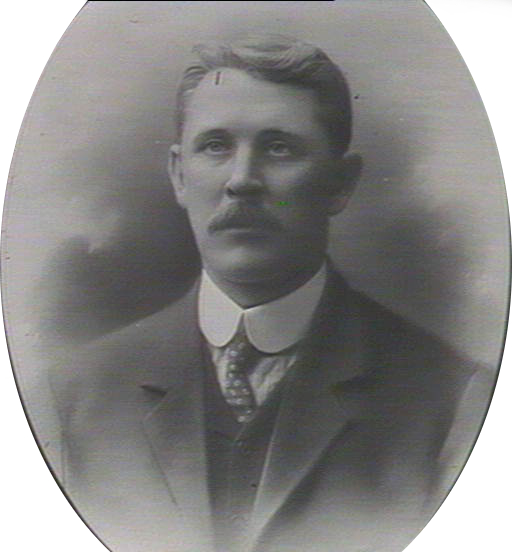
James Ashton (photographed in 1914).

In 1910 Ashton invested in the Coreena Pastoral Company which owned sheep and cattle stations in Queensland, becoming a shareholder and director of the company alongside Sir Samuel McCaughey, who had been a member of the New South Wales Legislative Council since 1899. Ashton developed a close association with McCaughey and acted as his attorney and adviser.

During World War I Ashton was an executive of the Australian Red Cross Society.

By September 1918 when he turned eighteen Ashton's eldest son, James Hay Ashton, travelled to England accompanied by his mother with the intention of joining the Royal Flying Corps, but did not arrive in London until after the signing of the Armistice.

Ashton was an executor and trustee of the estate of Sir Samuel McCaughey, who died in 1919.

In 1920 Ashton was "chairman of the body appointed to inquire into Federal and State taxation". In the same year he purchased 'Markdale', a property at Binda in the Southern Tablelands of New South Wales, to be owned and worked by his sons, and managed by his eldest son James.

Ashton was a director of various companies including the Union Trustee Company of Australia, the Scottish Union and National Insurance Company and Anthony Hordern and Sons Ltd. He was a director and served as chairman of the Mutual Life and Citizens' Assurance Company Ltd from 1927 to 1939 and of the Commercial Banking Company of Sydney from 1933 to 1938.

James Ashton died on 6 August 1939 at his home in Bay Street, Double Bay, aged 75. He had been seriously ill for several weeks before his death. Helen Ashton died on 24 October 1939 at her home in Double Bay.

== Notes ==
A.John Johnston was born on 23 December 1863 in Scotland, the son of Thomas Johnston and Margaret (née Kirkaldy). He emigrated to Australia with his family in about 1876. His father was employed as foreman of the Cobb and Co. coach factory at Castlemaine in central Victoria. Soon afterwards the Johnston family moved to Hay where Robertson and Wagner, the proprietors of Cobb and Co., established a depot and coach-building facilities. After completing his education at Hay Public School, Johnston joined the clerical staff of Cobb and Co. at Hay and eventually became the accountant for the firm.

B.In her early twenties Helen Willis was a student in art classes conducted by the painter Julian Ashton. In about 1889 Ashton painted a portrait of Miss Willis titled 'Spring'.

Parliament of New South Wales
Political offices
Preceded by Edward O'Sullivan	Secretary for Lands; 1904 – 1907	Succeeded by Samuel Moore
New South Wales Legislative Assembly
New seat	Member for Hay; 1894–1898	Succeeded by Frank Byrne
Preceded by Leslie Hollis	Member for Goulburn; 1898–1907	Succeeded by Gus James
