= Michael Chapman (Australian politician) =

Australian politician (1822–1906)

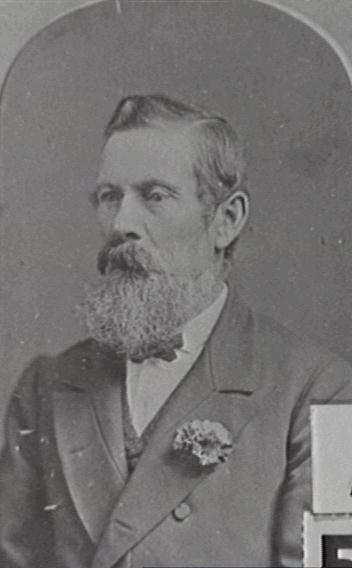

Member of the New South Wales Legislative Assembly for Glebe
- In office 22 February 1887 – 6 June 1891
- In office 13 July 1883 – 7 October 1885

Mayor of Glebe
- In office 1882–1884

Personal details
- Born: 1822 Cloyne, County Cork
- Died: February 23, 1906 (aged 84) Forest Lodge, Sydney, Australia
- Party: Free Trader
- Spouse: Catherine Shanahan (m. 1846)
- Children: 4
- Occupation: Oil trader; politician

Michael Chapman (1822 – 23 February 1906) was an Irish-born Australian politician.

He was born at Cloyne to property owner William Chapman and Mary. In 1840 he migrated to New South Wales, and on 11 December 1846 he married Catherine Shanahan, with whom he had four children. A successful oil trader, he served on Sydney City Council from 1860 to 1862 and from 1866 to 1900; he was also a Glebe alderman from 1866 to 1875 and from 1878 to 1893, and mayor from 1882 to 1884. In 1883 he was elected to the New South Wales Legislative Assembly as the member for Glebe. Defeated in 1885, he returned in 1887 as a Free Trader. He was re-elected in 1889, but defeated in 1891. Chapman died at Forest Lodge in 1906.

New South Wales Legislative Assembly
Preceded by Sir George Allen	Member for Glebe; 1883–1885	Succeeded by John Meeks; William Wilkinson
Preceded by John Meeks	Member for Glebe; 1887–1891; Served alongside: Wilkinson/Smith	Succeeded by Thomas Houghton
Civic offices
Preceded by Walter Renny	Mayor of Sydney; 1871–1872	Succeeded by James Merriman
Preceded by Charles Field	Mayor of The Glebe; 1882 – 1885	Succeeded by Thomas John Dunn
