= George Wigram Allen =

Australian politician

The Honourable Sir George Wigram Allen KCMG
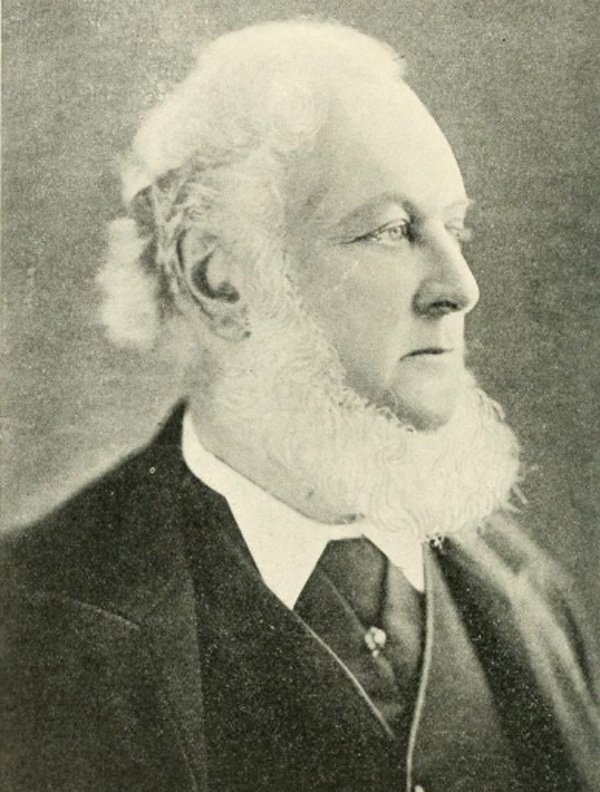
- Allen c.1880

5th Speaker of the New South Wales Legislative Assembly
- In office 23 March 1875 – 23 November 1882
- Preceded by: William Arnold
- Succeeded by: Edmund Barton

Member of the New South Wales Parliament for Glebe
- In office 1864–1883
- Preceded by: Thomas Smart
- Succeeded by: Michael Chapman

Personal details
- Born: 16 May 1824 Surry Hills, Colony of New South Wales
- Died: 23 July 1885 (aged 60) Glebe, New South Wales
- Spouse(s): Marian (née Boyce); Lady Allen

Sir George Wigram Allen KCMG (16 May 1824 – 23 July 1885) was an Australian politician and philanthropist. He was Speaker in the New South Wales Legislative Assembly 1875–1883. Allen was held in high esteem and described as 'A man of calm judgment and much practical wisdom'.

== Early life ==
Allen was born in Surry Hills, New South Wales, the eldest son of George Allen (attorney and solicitor) and his wife Jane, née Bowden. He was educated under William Timothy Cape and at Sydney College. In 1841, Allen was articled to his father and he became a solicitor in 1846.

== Legal career ==
The following year Allen entered a partnership with his father as a solicitor and today that firm is known as Allens and is the oldest in Australia. He was also a director of many public companies including the Bank of New South Wales.

== Marriage ==
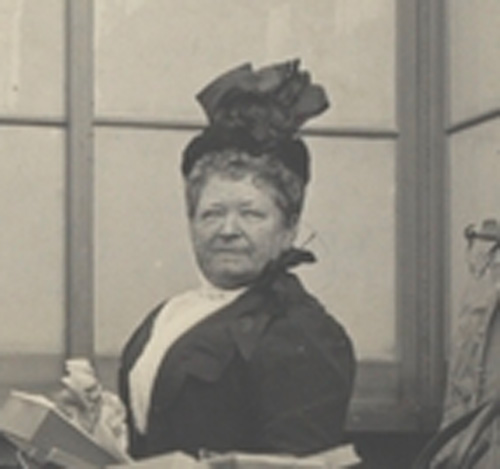
Lady Allen as a widow c.1900

Allen married Marian Boyce (1835–1914), eldest daughter of the Rev. William Boyce, in July 1851 and they lived at Strathmore, opposite his father's home Toxteth Park. In 1881 they moved to Toxteth Park having added a third storey, a tower and various embellishments such as a ballroom. The Allens entertained there on a grand scale. Lady Allen was an active charitable worker. She was involved with the boarding out of orphan children from the Benevolent Asylum and was a co-founder of the Royal Alexandra Hospital for Children. The marriage produced six sons and four daughters.

== Honours ==
He was knighted in 1877.

In 1884 he was appointed a Knight Commander of the Order of St Michael and St George (KCMG).

Civic offices
| New title Council proclaimed | Chairman of The Glebe Municipal Council; 1859 – 1867 | Renamed Mayor |
| New title Renamed from Chairman | Mayor of The Glebe; 1867 – 1878 | Succeeded by John Henry Seamer |
New South Wales Legislative Assembly
| Preceded by Thomas Smart | Member for Glebe; 1869 – 1883 | Succeeded by Michael Chapman |
| Preceded by William Arnold | Speaker of the Legislative Assembly; 1875 – 1882 | Succeeded by Edmund Barton |
Political offices
| New office | Minister of Justice and Public Instruction; 1873 – 1875 | Succeeded by Joseph Docker |
