= Samuel Wilkinson Moore =

Australia politician and mine manager (1854–1935)

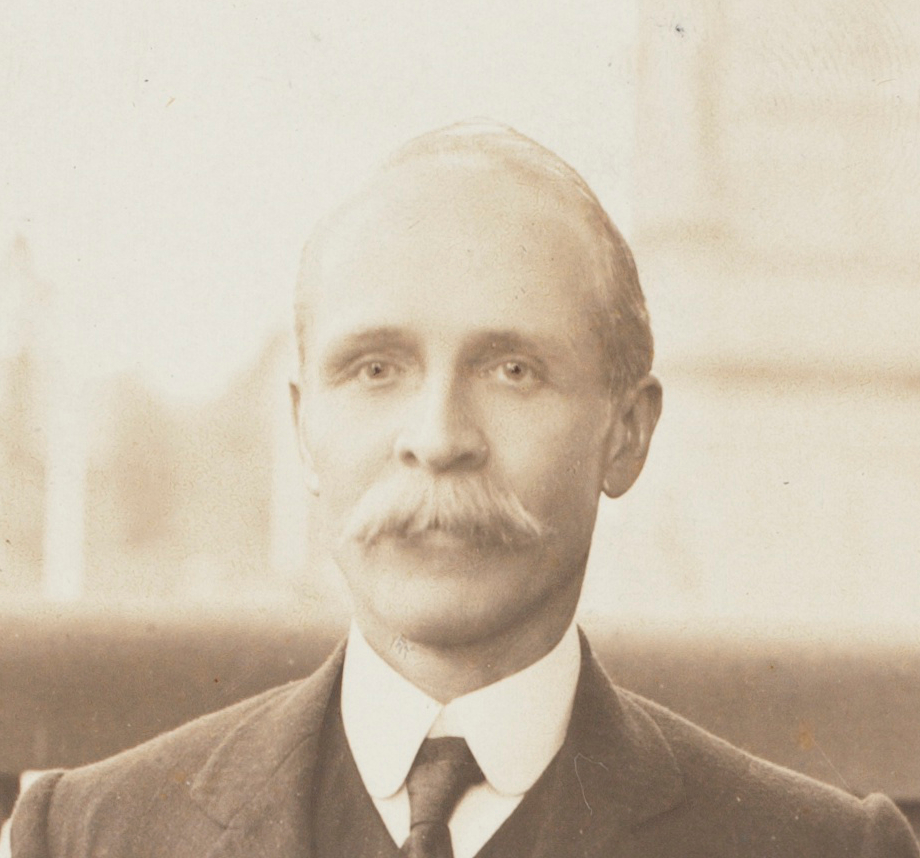

Samuel Wilkinson Moore (7 February 1854 – 15 February 1935) was a politician and mine manager in New South Wales, Australia, a member of the Australian Free Trade and Liberal Reform parties, serving in the Legislative Assembly. He served as Secretary for Mines and Agriculture and Secretary for Lands.

== Early life ==
Moore was born in Bua, on Vanua Levu (Sandalwood Island), Fiji, the son of the Reverend William Moore, Wesleyan Minister and missionary and his wife Mary Ann née Ducker. The family arrived in Sydney in 1864 and Moore attended Newington College (1865–1869), when it was located at Newington House on the Parramatta River at Silverwater. From 1870 until 1872 he was a student teacher at the private High School, Goulburn, run by George Metcalfe who had been his Headmaster at Newington. In 1873 he went to the Tingha tinfields as secretary and manager of the Britannia Tin Mining Company. Moore married Isabella Sawkins on 18 June 1876 and had four daughters and a son. He was commissioned as a Justice of the Peace in 1879 and was a member of Board of Technical Education from 1886 until 1887. In 1896, Moore was elected the second President of the Old Newingtonians' Union. He served again in that position in 1898, 1904 and 1916.

== Parliamentary service ==
Moore was a member of the Legislative Assembly for a total of 24 years, ten months and 27 days. He was elected for Inverell from 19 October 1885 to 19 January 1889, when he retired. He returne dto politics in 1894 and was elected to represent Bingara serving from 17 July 1894 until 14 September 1910 when he was defeated. He served as Secretary for Mines and Agriculture in the Carruthers ministry from 29 August 1904 to 1 October 1907 and as Secretary for Lands in the Wade ministry from 2 October 1907 until 20 October 1910.

== Post-Parliamentary career ==
After Moore was defeated at the 1910 election, he was appointed Commissioner of the Western Lands Board and retired from that position in 1922.

Moore died in the Roseville on 15 February 1935 (aged 81).

Parliament of New South Wales
Political offices
Preceded by John Kidd	Secretary for Mines and Agriculture; 1904 – 1907	Succeeded by John Perry
Preceded by James Ashton	Secretary for Lands; 1907 – 1910	Succeeded by Niels Nielsen
New South Wales Legislative Assembly
Preceded by Richard Murray	Member for Inverell; 1885 – 1889	Succeeded by George Cruickshank
Preceded by New district	Member for Bingara; 1894 – 1910	Succeeded by George McDonald
