= Electoral district of Glebe =

Former state electoral district of New South Wales, Australia

Glebe or The Glebe was an electoral district of the Legislative Assembly in the Australian state of New South Wales, originally created in 1859, partly replacing Sydney Hamlets, and named after and including the Sydney suburb of Glebe. It elected one member from 1859 to 1885 and two members from 1885 to 1894. In 1920, with the introduction of proportional representation, it was absorbed into Balmain. Glebe was recreated in 1927 and abolished in 1941.

== Members for Glebe ==
Single-member (1859–1885)
Member	Party	Term			
John Campbell	None	1859–1860			
Thomas Smart	None	1860–1869			
Sir George Allen	None	1869–1883			
Michael Chapman	None	1883–1885			
Two members (1885–1894)
Member	Party	Term	Member	Party	Term
John Meeks	None	1885–1887	William Wilkinson	None	1885–1887
Michael Chapman	Free Trade	1887–1891	William Wilkinson	Free Trade	1887–1889
Michael Chapman	Free Trade	1887–1891	Bruce Smith	Free Trade	1889–1894
Thomas Houghton	Labour	1891–1894	Bruce Smith	Free Trade	1889–1894
Single-member (1894–1920)
Member	Party	Term			
James Hogue	Free Trade	1894–1901			
James Hogue	Liberal Reform	1901–1910			
Tom Keegan	Labor	1910–1920			
Single-member (1927–1941)
Member	Party	Term			
Tom Keegan	Labor	1927–1935			
Bill Carlton	Labor	1935–1941			

== Election results ==
1938 New South Wales state election: Glebe
Party	Candidate	Votes	%	±%
Labor	Bill Carlton	7,023	46.0	−13.0
Industrial Labor	Horace Foley	6,218	40.7	+40.7
Independent	Bertie Lewis	2,021	13.2	+13.2
Total formal votes		15,262	96.8	−1.0
Informal votes		500	3.2	+1.0
Turnout		15,762	95.9	+0.3
Two-candidate-preferred result
Labor	Bill Carlton	7,899	51.8	
Industrial Labor	Horace Foley	7,363	48.2	
Labor hold		Swing	N/A	
