= James Hogue (politician) =

Australian journalist and politician

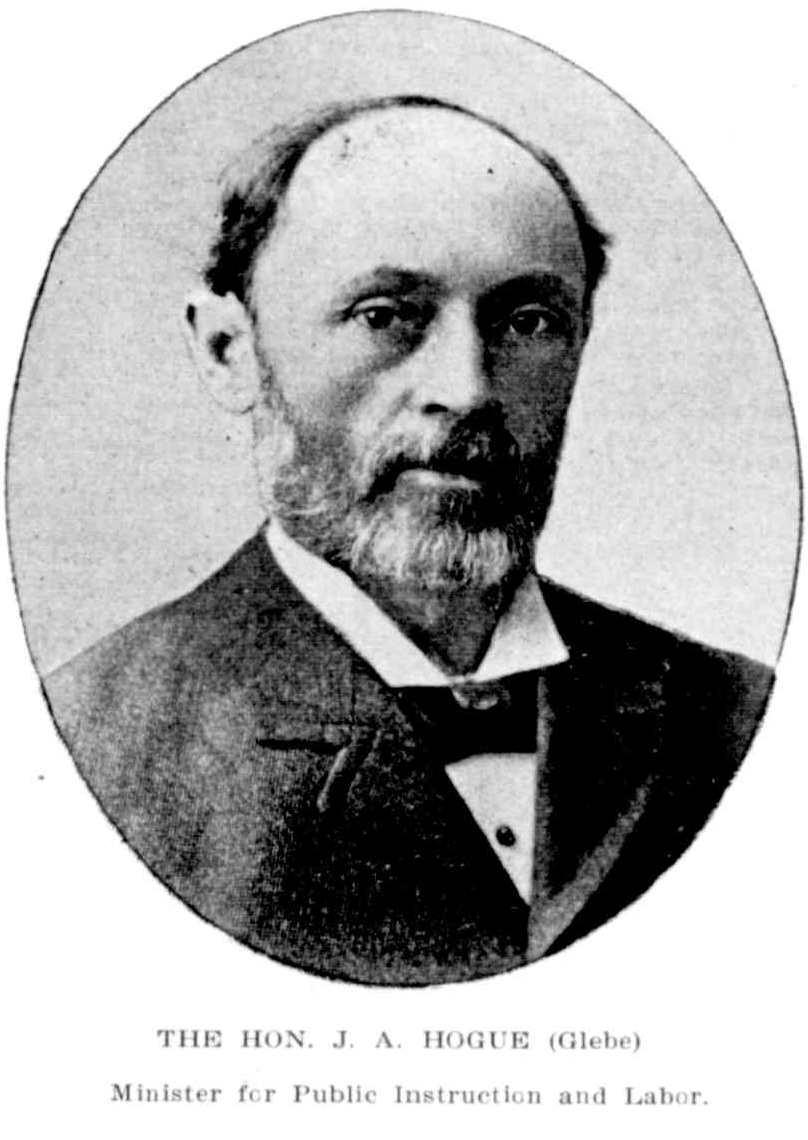

James Alexander Hogue (2 September 1846 – 2 August 1920) was an Australian journalist and politician.

He was born at Clarence Town to miller Fitzarthur Hogue and Elizabeth McKay. He attended Newcastle Church of England Grammar School and was briefly a pupil teacher before becoming a compositor, then taking a job as a parliamentary reporter in 1875. On 17 April 1878 he married Jessie Robards at Clarence Town; they would have ten children.

In 1894 he was elected to the New South Wales Legislative Assembly as the Free Trade member for Glebe. In 1898 he was appointed Minister of Public Instruction and Minister for Labour and Industry, serving until 1899. He was Colonial Secretary from 1904 to 1907 and Minister of Public Instruction from 1907 to 1910, when he lost his seat.

Hogue died at Mosman in 1920 and was buried at Waverley Cemetery.

Hogue Place, in the Canberra suburb of Gilmore, is named in his and his son Oliver Hogue's honour.

Parliament of New South Wales
Political offices
Preceded by Jacob Garrard	Minister of Public Instruction; Minister for Labour and Industry; 1898 – 1899	Succeeded by John Perry
Preceded by John Perry	Colonial Secretary; 1904 – 1907	Succeeded by Thomas Waddell
Preceded by Broughton O'Conor	Minister of Public Instruction; 1907 – 1910	Succeeded by George Beeby
Preceded by Broughton O'Conor	Minister for Labour and Industry; May – October 1907	Succeeded by William Wood
Preceded by William Wood	Minister for Labour and Industry; 1908 – 1910	Succeeded by George Beeby
New South Wales Legislative Assembly
Preceded by Thomas Houghton; Bruce Smith	Member for Glebe; 1894–1910	Succeeded by Tom Keegan
