= Storey ministry =

37th New South Wales ministry, led by John Storey

- 37th Cabinet of the State of New South Wales

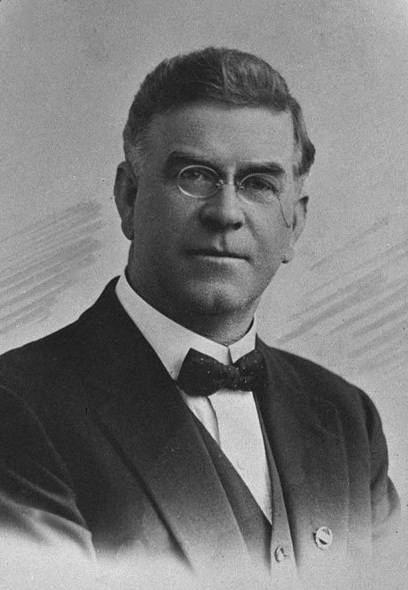
- Premier John Storey
- Date formed: 12 April 1920
- Date dissolved: 10 October 1921

People and organisations
- Monarch: George V
- Governor: Sir Walter Davidson
- Head of government: John Storey
- No. of ministers: 11
- Member party: Labor
- Status in legislature: Minority government
- Opposition party: Nationalist
- Opposition leader: George Fuller

History
- Election: 1920 New South Wales election
- Predecessor: Holman Labor ministry
- Successor: Dooley ministry

The Storey ministry was the 37th ministry of the New South Wales Government, and was led by the 20th Premier, John Storey.

Storey was elected to the New South Wales Legislative Assembly in 1901, serving until his death while Premier in 1921, with a break between 1904 and 1907 following the abolition of his seat. In November 1916 Labor split over conscription, when Premier William Holman, and twenty of his supporters were expelled from the party for defying party policy and supporting conscription. Holman and his supporters joined a grand coalition with the members of the various conservative parties, which by 1917, this had coalesced into the Nationalist Party of Australia. Storey was elected leader of the Labor party in 1917 and helped to reduce the scale of Labor's defeat in the 1917 election.

Storey led Labor to a resurgent result at the 1920 state election, picking up 10 seats with Storey calling the result "half a mandate". Holman had been defeated for his seat and George Fuller became leader of the Nationalist Party. The assembly was evenly divided, with Labor having 43 seats and the support of Percy Brookfield (Socialist Labor) and Arthur Gardiner (Independent Labor), while the Nationalists had 28 seats and the support of 15 seats of the Progressive Party and 2 independent Nationalists. The Speaker of the Legislative Assembly did not vote unless there was a tie which meant whichever side provided the speaker was unable to command a majority. Nationalist Daniel Levy controversially accepted re-election as speaker, giving Labor an effective majority. Storey died in office on 5 October 1921.

The ministry covers the period from 12 April 1920, until 10 October 1821, when the ministry was dissolved and Storey's deputy, James Dooley, was appointed as Premier. This ministry was the first time in which the role of Premier was a separate ministerial portfolio.

== Composition of ministry ==
The composition of the ministry was announced by Premier Storey on 12 April 1920 and covers the period up to 10 October 1821, five days after Storey's death, when the ministry was dissolved.

Portfolio	Minister	Party	Term start	Term end	Term length
Premier	John Storey (Note: John Storey died on 5 October and his deputy, James Dooley was acting Premier.)	Labor	12 April 1920	5 October 1921	1 year, 176 days
Premier	James Dooley	Labor	5 October 1921	10 October 1921	5 days
Chief Secretary; Minister for Housing	James Dooley	Labor	12 April 1920	10 October 1921	1 year, 181 days
Treasurer	Jack Lang	Labor	12 April 1920	10 October 1921	1 year, 181 days
Attorney-General	Edward McTiernan (Note: Edward McTiernan was both Attorney-General and Minister of Justice until William McKell was appointed Minister of Justice on 22 December 1920.)	Labor	12 April 1920	10 October 1921	1 year, 181 days
Minister of Justice	Edward McTiernan	Labor	12 April 1920	21 December 1920	253 days
Minister of Justice	William McKell	Labor	22 December 1920	10 October 1921	292 days
Minister without portfolio (Assistant Minister of Justice)	William McKell	Labor	12 April 1920	21 December 1920	253 days
Secretary for Lands; Minister for Forests	Peter Loughlin	Labor	12 April 1920	10 October 1921	1 year, 181 days
Secretary for Public Works; Minister for Railways	John Estell	Labor	12 April 1920	10 October 1921	1 year, 181 days
Minister of Public Instruction; Minister for Local Government	Thomas Mutch	Labor	12 April 1920	10 October 1921	1 year, 181 days
Secretary for Mines; Minister for Labour and Industry	George Cann	Labor	12 April 1920	10 October 1921	1 year, 181 days
Minister for Agriculture	Bill Dunn	Labor	12 April 1920	10 October 1921	1 year, 181 days
Minister for Public Health and Motherhood	Greg McGirr	Labor	12 April 1920	10 October 1921	1 year, 181 days
Solicitor General	Robert Sproule MLC	Labor	15 April 1920	10 October 1921	1 year, 178 days
Vice-President of the Executive Council; Representative of the Government in Legislative Council	Edward Kavanagh MLC	Labor	21 April 1920	10 October 1921	1 year, 172 days

Ministers are members of the Legislative Assembly unless otherwise noted.

== See also ==
- Members of the New South Wales Legislative Assembly, 1920–1922
- Members of the New South Wales Legislative Council, 1920–1922

Preceded by Holman ministry (1916 – 1920)	Storey ministry 1920 – 1921	Succeeded by Dooley ministry (1921)
