= Fuller ministry (1922–1925) =

- 41st Cabinet of the State of New South Wales

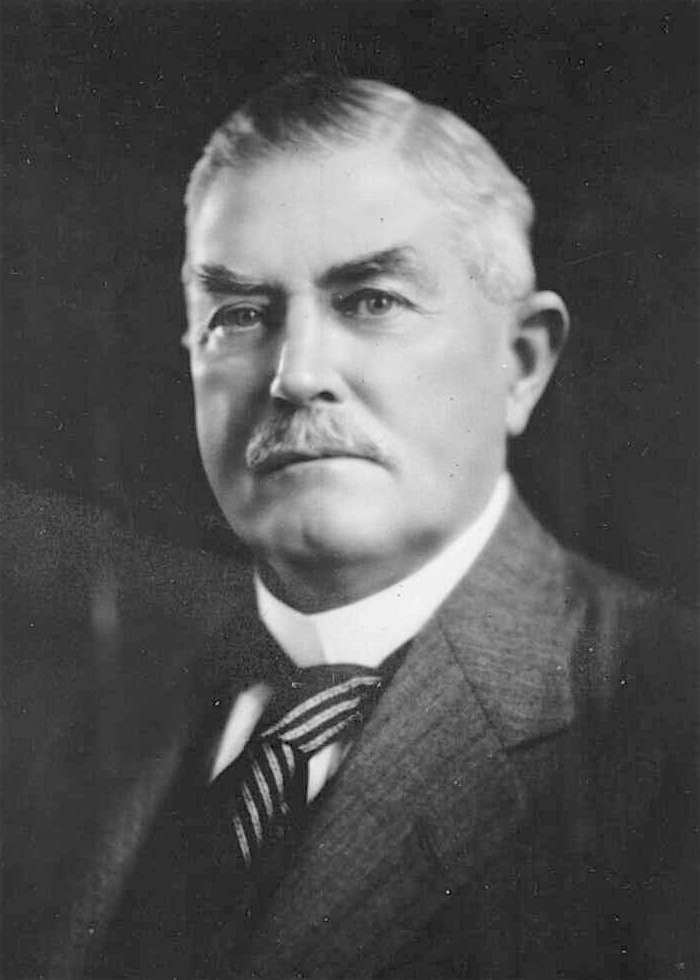
- Premier Sir George Fuller
- Date formed: 13 April 1922
- Date dissolved: 17 June 1925

People and organisations
- Monarch: George V
- Governor: Sir Walter Davidson / Sir Dudley de Chair
- Premier: Sir George Fuller
- No. of ministers: 12
- Member party: Nationalist
- Status in legislature: Majority government
- Opposition party: Labor
- Opposition leader: James Dooley / Greg McGirr / Bill Dunn / Jack Lang

History
- Election: 1922 New South Wales election
- Predecessor: Dooley ministry (1921–1922)
- Successor: Lang ministry (1925–1927)

The Fuller ministry (1922–1925) or Second Fuller ministry was the 41st ministry of the New South Wales Government, and was led by the 22nd Premier, Sir George Fuller. This ministry was the second of two occasions where Fuller was Premier.

Fuller was first elected to the New South Wales Legislative Assembly in 1889, defeated in 1894, elected to the House of Representatives in 1901, defeated in 1914, and re-elected to the Assembly in 1917 and serving until 1928. Fuller becoming leader of the Nationalist Party following the 1920 state election. The Speaker of the Legislative Assembly did not vote unless there was a tie which meant whichever side provided the speaker was unable to command a majority. Nationalist Daniel Levy controversially accepted re-election as speaker, giving Labor an effective majority.

James Dooley became Premier following the death of John Story. In December 1921 Fuller indicated to Levy that it was likely he could form a coalition with the Progressives and Levy resigned as speaker on 12 December 1921. Levy was replaced by Labor's Simon Hickey and the government was defeated on the floor of the house 44 votes to 45. (Note: As the speaker did not vote, with Hickey as speaker Labor was reduced to 43 votes, plus the support of Arthur Gardiner (Independent Labor).) The Dooley ministry resigned and as a result Fuller was asked by Governor Sir Walter Davidson to form a government. The coalition did not have complete support, with Nationalists William Ashford and William Bagnall reportedly dissatisfied, while formal coalition was opposed by the True Blue members of the Progressive party, led by Michael Bruxner and Ernest Buttenshaw. It is not clear who Fuller hoped would take the role of speaker; however, when the Legislative Assembly resumed, Bagnall offered to accept the role of speaker. Rather than have Bagnall as speaker, Levy agreed to return to the role. Fuller sought an early election, which was refused and the ministry resigned, seven hours after it was commissioned.

Davidson commissioned Dooley to form a second ministry that lasted until the 1922 state election when Fuller was successful in defeating Dooley, with the Nationalists winning 41 seats, the Progressive Party 9 and Labor having 36 seats.

The ministry covers the period from 13 April 1922 until 17 June 1925 when Fuller was defeated by Labor's Jack Lang at the 1925 state election.

== Composition of ministry ==
The composition of the ministry was announced by Premier Fuller on 13 April 1922.

Portfolio	Minister	Party	Term commence	Term end	Term of office
Premier	Sir George Fuller	Nationalist	13 April 1922	17 June 1925	3 years, 65 days
Chief Secretary; Minister of Public Health	Charles Oakes, MLC	Nationalist	13 April 1922	17 June 1925	3 years, 65 days
Treasurer	Sir Arthur Cocks (Note: Resigned and appointed as Agent General for New South Wales in London.)	Nationalist	13 April 1922	14 February 1925	2 years, 307 days
Treasurer	Sir George Fuller	Nationalist	24 February 1925	17 June 1925	113 days
Attorney General	Thomas Bavin, KC	Nationalist	13 April 1922	17 June 1925	3 years, 65 days
Secretary for Lands; Minister for Forests	Walter Wearne	Nationalist	13 April 1922	17 June 1925	3 years, 65 days
Secretary for Public Works; Minister for Railways; Minister for Housing	Sir Thomas Henley (Note: Resigned, necessitating a minor reshuffle.)	Nationalist	13 April 1922	19 June 1922	67 days
Secretary for Public Works; Minister for Railways; Minister for Housing	Richard Ball	Nationalist	28 June 1922	17 June 1925	2 years, 354 days
Minister for Agriculture	Richard Ball	Nationalist	13 April 1922	28 June 1922	2 years, 354 days
Minister for Agriculture	Frank Chaffey	Nationalist	28 June 1922	17 June 1925	2 years, 354 days
Minister of Justice	Thomas Ley	Nationalist	13 April 1922	17 June 1925	3 years, 65 days
Minister of Public Instruction	Albert Bruntnell	Nationalist	13 April 1922	17 June 1925	3 years, 65 days
Secretary for Mines; Minister for Local Government	John Fitzpatrick	Nationalist	13 April 1922	17 June 1925	3 years, 65 days
Vice-president of the Executive Council; Representative of the Government in Legislative Council	Sir Joseph Carruthers, MLC	Nationalist	13 April 1922	17 June 1925	3 years, 65 days
Minister for Labour and Industry	Ernest Farrar, MLC	Nationalist	13 April 1922	17 June 1925	3 years, 65 days
Honorary Minister	Francis Boyce, MLC	Nationalist	4 March 1924	17 June 1925	1 year, 105 days

Ministers are members of the Legislative Assembly unless otherwise noted.

== See also ==
- First Fuller ministry
- Members of the New South Wales Legislative Assembly, 1922-1925
- Members of the New South Wales Legislative Council, 1922-1925

Preceded by Dooley ministry (1921–1922)	Fuller ministry 1922–1925	Succeeded by Lang ministry (1925–1927)
