= Dooley ministry (1921) =

38th New South Wales government ministry, led by James Dooley

- 38th Cabinet of the State of New South Wales

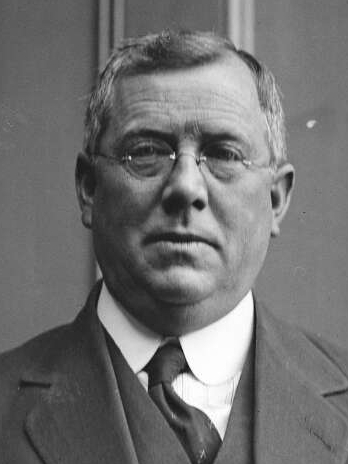
- Premier James Dooley
- Date formed: 10 October 1921
- Date dissolved: 20 December 1921

People and organisations
- Monarch: George V
- Governor: Sir Walter Davidson
- Head of government: James Dooley
- No. of ministers: 13
- Member party: Labor
- Status in legislature: Minority government
- Opposition party: Nationalist
- Opposition leader: George Fuller

History
- Outgoing election: 1920 New South Wales election
- Predecessor: Storey ministry
- Successor: Fuller ministry

The Dooley ministry (1921) or the first Dooley ministry was the 38th ministry of the New South Wales Government, and was led by the 21st Premier, James Dooley. It was the first of two occasions that Dooley was Premier.

Dooley was elected to the New South Wales Legislative Assembly in 1907, serving until 1927, when he fell out with the Labor leadership, lost Labor preselection, and stood unsuccessfully as an Independent Labor candidate for the Senate in the 1931 federal election. Dooley served as Deputy Labor leader to Ernest Durack and then John Storey, when Labor came to power at the 1920 state election, with what Storey called "half a mandate". The assembly was evenly divided, with Labor having 43 seats and the support of Percy Brookfield (Socialist Labor) and Arthur Gardiner (Independent Labor), while the Nationalists had 28 seats and the support of 15 seats of Progressive Party and 2 independent Nationalists. The Speaker of the Legislative Assembly did not vote unless there was a tie which meant whichever side provided the speaker was unable to command a majority. Nationalist Daniel Levy controversially accepted re-election as speaker, giving Labor an effective majority, Storey died in office on 5 October 1921.

On Storey's death Dooley became Leader and Premier, reconstituting the ministry, which was largely unchanged from the Storey ministry, with the portfolio of Local Government moving from Thomas Mutch to George Cann, the portfolio of Labour and Industry was split into Labour which moved to Greg McGirr and industry becoming State Industrial Enterprises and given to Carlo Lazzarini.

The ministry covers the period from 10 October 1921, five days after Storey's death, until they resigned on 20 December 1921. Levy had resigned as speaker on 12 December 1921, replaced by Labor's Simon Hickey and the government was defeated on the floor of the house 44 votes to 45. (Note: As the speaker did not vote, with Hickey as speaker Labor was reduced to 43 votes, plus the support of Arthur Gardiner (Independent Labor).) Levy was re-elected as speaker, which meant new Premier George Fuller could not command a majority in the house and resigned within seven hours of his appointment. Levy remained as speaker as the only way to have a workable parliament, allowing Dooley to regain power forming the second Dooley ministry.

== Composition of ministry ==
The composition of the ministry was announced by Premier Dooley on 10 October 1921, and covers the period up to 20 December 1921, when the ministry resigned.

Portfolio	Minister	Party	Term commence	Term end	Term of office
Premier; Chief Secretary	James Dooley	Labor	10 October 1921	20 December 1921	71 days
Treasurer	Jack Lang	Labor	10 October 1921	20 December 1921	71 days
Attorney-General	Edward McTiernan	Labor	10 October 1921	20 December 1921	71 days
Secretary for Lands; Minister for Forests	Peter Loughlin	Labor	10 October 1921	20 December 1921	71 days
Secretary for Public Works; Minister for Railways	John Estell	Labor	10 October 1921	20 December 1921	71 days
Minister of Justice	William McKell	Labor	10 October 1921	20 December 1921	71 days
Minister of Public Instruction	Thomas Mutch	Labor	10 October 1921	20 December 1921	71 days
Secretary for Mines; Minister for Local Government	George Cann	Labor	10 October 1921	20 December 1921	71 days
Solicitor General	Robert Sproule MLC	Labor	10 October 1921	20 December 1921	71 days
Minister for Agriculture	Bill Dunn	Labor	10 October 1921	20 December 1921	71 days
Minister for Public Health and Motherhood; Minister for Labour	Greg McGirr	Labor	10 October 1921	20 December 1921	71 days
Minister for State Industrial Enterprises	Carlo Lazzarini	Labor	10 October 1921	20 December 1921	71 days
Vice-President of the Executive Council; Representative of the Government in Legislative Council	Edward Kavanagh MLC	Labor	10 October 1921	20 December 1921	71 days

Ministers are members of the Legislative Assembly unless otherwise noted.

== See also ==
- Second Dooley ministry
- Members of the New South Wales Legislative Assembly, 1920–1922
- Members of the New South Wales Legislative Council, 1920–1922

Preceded by Storey ministry	Dooley ministry 1921	Succeeded by Fuller ministry (1921)
