= Members of the New South Wales Legislative Assembly, 1920–1922 =

Members of the New South Wales Legislative Assembly who served in the 25th parliament of New South Wales held their seats from 1920 to 1922. They were elected at the 1920 state election on 20 March 1920. The Speaker was Daniel Levy with the exception of 13–20 December 1921 when he was replaced by Simon Hickey.

Between 1920 and 1927 the Legislative Assembly was elected using a form of proportional representation with multi-member seats and a single transferable vote (modified Hare-Clark). There was confusion at the time as to the process to be used to fill the vacancy. When George Beeby resigned on 9 August 1920, in accordance with the practice prior to 1920, the Speaker of the Legislative Assembly issued a writ of election requiring a by-election to be conducted, however the Chief Electoral Officer said he couldn't do so under the law at the time and that a by-election would be contrary to the principle of proportional representation. The vacancies were left unfilled until the Parliament passed the Parliamentary Elections (Casual Vacancies) Act on 10 December 1920, so that casual vacancies were filled by the next unsuccessful candidate on the incumbent member's party list. If an Independent member retired, the Clerk of the Assembly determined who would fill the vacancy based on the departing members voting record on questions of confidence.

Name	Party	Electorate	Term in office'
David Anderson	Nationalist	Ryde	1920–1930
Guy Arkins	Nationalist	St George	1915–1930 1938–1941
Richard Arthur	Nationalist	North Shore	1904–1932
William Ashford	Nationalist	Wammerawa	1910–1925
William Bagnall	Nationalist	St George	1913–1925 1925–1927
Jack Bailey	Labor	Goulburn	1918–1925
Richard Ball	Nationalist	Murray	1895–1898 1904–1937
Thomas Bavin	Progressive	Ryde	1917–1935
George Beeby (Note: Murray Progressive MLA George Beeby resigned on 9 August 1920 to accept appointment as a Judge of the New South Wales arbitration court. He was replaced by Matthew Kilpatrick on 15 December 1920.)	Progressive	Murray	1907–1913 1917–1920
Walter Bennett	Progressive	Maitland	1889–1902 1917–1934
John Birt	Labor	Sydney	1919–1925
George Briner (Note: Oxley Progressive MLA George Briner died on 9 September 1920. He was replaced by Theodore Hill on 15 December 1920.)	Progressive	Oxley	1901–1920
Percy Brookfield (Note: The member for Sturt Percy Brookfield was murdered while trying to disarm a deranged man at Riverton on 22 March 1921. Which party interest Brookfield represented was not straightforward. He had been elected under the banner of the Socialist Labor Party at the 1920 election for Sturt, however he formed a new Industrial Labor Party in February 1921, shortly before his death. There was debate concerning who should be appointed. The Industrial Labor Party said that John O'Reilly should be appointed, while The Sydney Morning Herald stated that Thomas Hynes had the greater number of primary votes at the 1920 election and thus he should be appointed. The nomination had to come from the recognised party leader according to votes on any censure motion and Labor leader and Premier John Storey nominated Jabez Wright who took his seat on 30 August 1921.)	Socialist Labor	Sturt	1917–1921
Albert Bruntnell	Nationalist	Parramatta	1906–1907 1910–1913 1919–1929
Michael Bruxner	Progressive	Northern Tablelands	1920–1962
Arthur Buckley	Labor	Sydney	1917–1922
Frank Burke	Labor	Botany	1917–1944
Michael Burke	Labor	Sydney	1917–1922 1925–1930
Ernest Buttenshaw	Progressive	Murrumbidgee	1917–1938
William Cameron	Nationalist	Maitland	1918–1931
George Cann	Labor	St George	1914–1927
Ernest Carr	Nationalist	Cumberland	1920–1922
Frank Chaffey	Nationalist	Namoi	1913–1940
Joseph Clark	Labor	Wammerawa	1920–1927 1930–1932
John Cleary	Labor	Wollondilly	1920–1922
Arthur Cocks	Nationalist	North Shore	1910–1925
Hugh Connell	Labor	Newcastle	1920–1934
Mat Davidson	Labor	Sturt	1918–1949
Billy Davies	Labor	Wollondilly	1917–1949
Brian Doe	Nationalist	Sturt	1917–1927
James Dooley	Labor	Bathurst	1907–1927
John Doyle	Labor	Balmain	1917–1922
David Drummond	Progressive	Northern Tablelands	1920–1949
Bill Dunn	Labor	Wammerawa	1910–1911, 1911–1932, 1935–1950
Daniel Dwyer (Note: Eastern Suburbs Labor MLA James Fingleton died on 13 October 1920. Scott Campbell had been the first unsuccessful candidate at the 1920 election nominated by the Labor Party, however his endorsement was withdrawn before the polling day because he signed a pledge for the unconditional release of twelve imprisoned members of the Industrial Workers of the World. Labor decided that the first unsuccessful party candidate was Daniel Dwyer, and he took his seat on 15 December 1920.)	Labor	Eastern Suburbs	1920–1922
Bill Ely	Labor	Parramatta	1920–1922, 1925–1932
John Estell	Labor	Newcastle	1901–1913 1917–1922
John Fegan	Nationalist	Newcastle	1891–1907 1920–1922
James Fingleton	Labor	Eastern Suburbs	1913–1917 1920
Joseph Fitzgerald	Labor	Oxley	1920–1927 1930–1932
John Fitzpatrick	Nationalist	Bathurst	1895–1904 1907–1930
Martin Flannery	Labor	Murrumbidgee	1920–1932
Sir George Fuller	Nationalist	Wollondilly	1889–1894 1915–1928
Arthur Gardiner	Independent	Newcastle	1910–1922
Mark Gosling	Labor	St George	1920–1932
Robert Greig	Labor	Ryde	1920–1927 1941–1947
Arthur Grimm	Nationalist	Murrumbidgee	1913–1925
Sir Thomas Henley	Nationalist	Ryde	1904–1935
Simon Hickey	Labor	Botany	1912–1922
Theodore Hill	Progressive	Oxley	1920–1927
Tom Hoskins	Nationalist	Western Suburbs	1913–1927
Harold Jaques	Nationalist	Eastern Suburbs	1920–1930
Gus James (Note: Goulburn Nationalist MLA Gus James resigned on 21 September 1920 to take an appointment as a judge of the Supreme Court. He was replaced by William Millard on 15 December 1920.)	Nationalist	Goulburn	1907–1920
Valentine Johnston	Labor	Bathurst	1917–1922
William Kearsley (Note: Newcastle Labor MLA William Kearsley died on 19 June 1921. He was replaced by David Murray on 30 August.)	Labor	Newcastle	1910–1921
Tom Keegan (Note: The premier and Balmain Labor MLA John Storey died on 5 October 1921. He was replaced by Tom Keegan on 18 October.)	Labor	Balmain	1910–1920 1921–1935
Matthew Kilpatrick	Progressive	Murray	1920–1941
Jack Lang	Labor	Parramatta	1913–1943, 1943–1946
Carlo Lazzarini	Labor	Western Suburbs	1917–1952
John Lee	Nationalist	Botany	1920–1930 1932–1941
Daniel Levy	Nationalist	Sydney	1901–1937
Thomas Ley	Progressive	St George	1917–1925
Peter Loughlin	Labor	Cootamundra	1917–1927, 1932–1935
Edward Loxton	Ind. Nationalist	Ryde	1920–1925
James MacArthur-Onslow	Progressive	Eastern Suburbs	1907–1922
Hugh Main	Progressive	Cootamundra	1920–1938
Alfred McClelland	Labor	Northern Tablelands	1920–1927 1930–1932
Greg McGirr	Labor	Cootamundra	1913–1925
William McKell	Labor	Botany	1917–1947
Edward McTiernan	Labor	Western Suburbs	1920–1927
William Millard (Note: Goulburn Nationalist MLA William Millard died on 8 October 1921. He had been appointed to replace Augustus James and, as there were no further unsuccessful Nationalist candidates, the Parliamentary Elections (Casual Vacancies) Act was amended to allow his replacement by John Perkins on 22 November 1921.)	Nationalist	Goulburn	1894–1920 1920–1921
Patrick Minahan	Labor	Sydney	1910–1917 1920–1927
Voltaire Molesworth	Labor	Cumberland	1920–1925
Cecil Murphy	Labor	North Shore	1920–1927
David Murray	Labor	Newcastle	1921–1928
Thomas Mutch	Labor	Botany	1917 -1930 1938–1941
George Nesbitt	Nationalist	Byron	1913–1925
Charles Oakes	Nationalist	Eastern Suburbs	1901–1910 1917–1925
William O'Brien	Labor	Murray	1917–1925
Walter O'Hearn	Labor	Maitland	1920–1932
Bob O'Halloran	Labor	Eastern Suburbs	1920–1927 1941–1947
Stephen Perdriau	Progressive	Byron	1920–1925
John Perkins	Nationalist	Goulburn	1921–1926
Richard Price	Progressive	Oxley	1894–1904 1907–1922
John Quirk	Labor	Balmain	1917–1938
Alfred Reid	Ind. Nationalist	North Shore	1920–1922, 1925–1945
Thomas Rutledge	Progressive	Goulburn	1920–1925
Patrick Scully	Labor	Namoi	1920–1923
Sydney Shillington	Nationalist	Western Suburbs	1919–1922
Albert Smith	Nationalist	Balmain	1920–1922
John Storey	Labor	Balmain	1901–1904 1907–1921
Robert Stuart-Robertson	Labor	Balmain	1907–1933
Tom Swiney	Labor	Byron	1920–1922
Bruce Walker	Nationalist	Cumberland	1917–1932
Walter Wearne	Progressive	Namoi	1917–1930
Reginald Weaver	Nationalist	North Shore	1917–1925, 1927–1945
James Wilson	Progressive	Western Suburbs	1920–1925
Jabez Wright	Labor	Sturt	1913–1920 1921–1922

== See also ==
- Storey ministry
- First Dooley ministry
- First Fuller ministry
- Second Dooley ministry
- Results of the 1920 New South Wales state election
- Candidates of the 1920 New South Wales state election
