= Fuller ministry (1921) =

- 39th Cabinet of the State of New South Wales

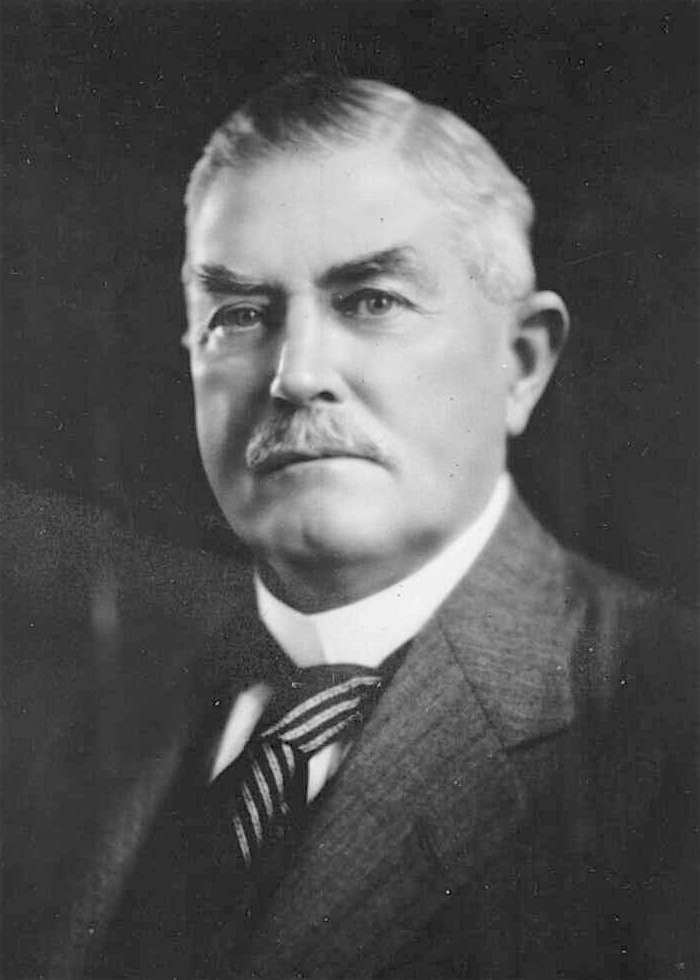
- Premier Sir George Fuller
- Date formed: 20 December 1921 a.m.
- Date dissolved: 20 December 1921 p.m.

People and organisations
- Monarch: George V
- Governor: Sir Walter Davidson
- Head of government: Sir George Fuller
- No. of ministers: 13
- Member party: Nationalist
- Status in legislature: Minority government
- Opposition party: Labor
- Opposition leader: James Dooley

History
- Outgoing election: 1920 New South Wales election
- Predecessor: Dooley ministry (1921)
- Successor: Dooley ministry (1921–1922)

The Fuller ministry (1921) or First Fuller ministry was the 39th ministry of the New South Wales Government, and was led by the 22nd Premier, Sir George Fuller. The ministry covers just seven hours during 20 December 1921, the shortest of any ministry in the history of self-government in the state.

Fuller was first elected to the New South Wales Legislative Assembly in 1889, defeated in 1894, elected to the House of Representatives in 1901, defeated in 1914, and re-elected to the Assembly in 1917 and serving until 1928. The 1920 state election saw a large swing against the Nationalist Party, losing 24 seats, including that of Premier William Holman, with Fuller becoming leader of the Nationalist Party. The assembly was evenly divided, with Labor having 43 seats and the support of Percy Brookfield (Socialist Labor) and Arthur Gardiner (Independent Labor), while the Nationalists had 28 seats, the Progressive Party had 15 seats and 2 independent Nationalists. The Speaker of the Legislative Assembly did not vote unless there was a tie which meant whichever side provided the speaker was unable to command a majority. Nationalist Daniel Levy controversially accepted re-election as speaker, giving Labor an effective majority.

James Dooley became Premier following the death of John Storey. In December 1921 Fuller indicated to Levy that it was likely he could form a coalition with the Progressives and Levy resigned as speaker on 12 December 1921. Levy was replaced by Labor's Simon Hickey and the government was defeated on the floor of the house 44 votes to 45. (Note: As the speaker did not vote, with Hickey as speaker Labor was reduced to 43 votes, plus the support of Arthur Gardiner (Independent Labor).) The Dooley ministry resigned and as a result Fuller was asked by Governor Sir Walter Davidson to form a government. The coalition did not have complete support, with Nationalists William Ashford and William Bagnall reportedly dissatisfied, while formal coalition was opposed by the True Blue members of the Progressive party, led by Michael Bruxner and Ernest Buttenshaw. Stephen Perdriau said that while he his name had been read out as a minister, he had not accepted or rejected the position. It is not clear who Fuller hoped would take the role of speaker, however when the Legislative Assembly resumed, Bagnall offered to accept the role of speaker, stating that "I cannot reconcile myself to this recognition of the men who were the chief assassins of the last National Government, and to seeing them placed in the high and honorable positions of Ministers of the Crown". Rather than have Bagnall as speaker, Levy agreed to return to the role. Fuller sought an early election, which was refused and the ministry resigned, seven hours after it was commissioned.

Dooley reformed government, serving until it was defeated at the election in March 1922.

== Composition of ministry ==
The composition of the ministry was announced by Premier Fuller on 20 December 1921.

Portfolio	Minister	Party	Term commence	Term end	Term of office
Premier	Sir George Fuller	Nationalist	20 December 1921 a.m.	20 December 1921 p.m.	7 hours
Chief Secretary; Minister of Public Health	Charles Oakes	Nationalist	20 December 1921 a.m.	20 December 1921 p.m.	7 hours
Treasurer	Sir Arthur Cocks	Nationalist	20 December 1921 a.m.	20 December 1921 p.m.	7 hours
Attorney General; Minister of Justice	Thomas Bavin, KC	Progressive	20 December 1921 a.m.	20 December 1921 p.m.	7 hours
Secretary for Lands; Minister for Forests	Walter Wearne	Progressive	20 December 1921 a.m.	20 December 1921 p.m.	7 hours
Secretary for Public Works; Minister for Railways; Minister for Housing	Sir Thomas Henley	Nationalist	20 December 1921 a.m.	20 December 1921 p.m.	7 hours
Minister of Public Instruction, and Labour and Industry	Thomas Ley	Progressive	20 December 1921 a.m.	20 December 1921 p.m.	7 hours
Secretary for Mines; Minister for Local Government	John Fitzpatrick	Nationalist	20 December 1921 a.m.	20 December 1921 p.m.	7 hours
Minister for Agriculture	Frank Chaffey	Nationalist	20 December 1921 a.m.	20 December 1921 p.m.	7 hours
Minister for Business Undertakings	Stephen Perdriau	Progressive	20 December 1921 a.m.	20 December 1921 p.m.	7 hours
Vice-president of the Executive Council; Representative of the Government in Legislative Council	Sir Joseph Carruthers, MLC	Nationalist	20 December 1921 a.m.	20 December 1921 p.m.	7 hours

Ministers are members of the Legislative Assembly unless otherwise noted.

== See also ==
- Second Fuller ministry
- Members of the New South Wales Legislative Assembly, 1920-1922

Preceded by Dooley ministry (1921)	Fuller ministry 1921	Succeeded by Dooley ministry (1921–1922)
