= Holman ministry (1916–1920) =

36th ministry of New South Wales, led by William Holman

Second Holman ministry
- 36th Cabinet of the State of New South Wales

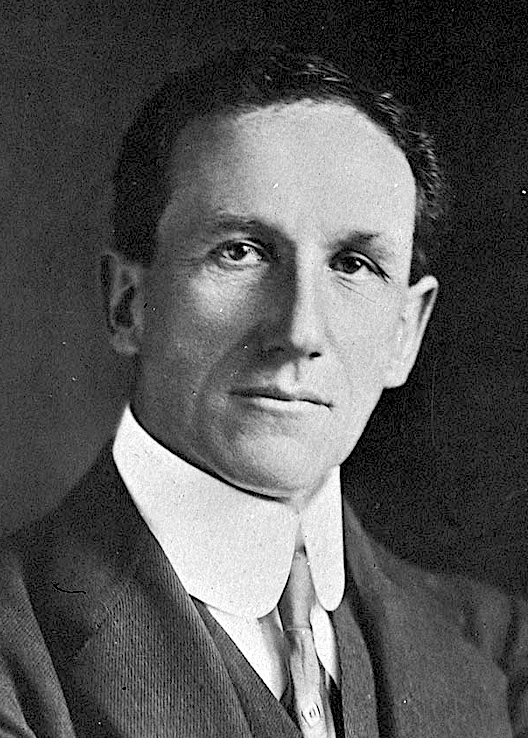
- Premier William Holman
- Date formed: 15 November 1916
- Date dissolved: 12 April 1920

People and organisations
- Monarch: George V
- Governor: Sir Gerald Strickland / Sir Walter Davidson
- Head of government: William Holman
- No. of ministers: 12
- Member party: grand coalition / Nationalist
- Status in legislature: Majority government
- Opposition party: Labor
- Opposition leader: John Storey

History
- Election: 1917 New South Wales election
- Outgoing election: 1920 New South Wales election
- Predecessor: Holman Labor ministry
- Successor: Storey ministry

The Holman ministry (1916 – 1920), also known as the Second Holman ministry or Holman Nationalist ministry, was the 36th ministry of the New South Wales Government, and was led by the 19th Premier, William Holman.

Holman was elected to the New South Wales Legislative Assembly in 1898, serving until 1920, before being elected to the Australian House of Representatives. Holman had earlier served as Deputy Leader in the ministry of James McGowen, before replacing McGowen as leader of the parliamentary Labor Party and serving as Labor Premier between 1913 and 1916.

In November 1916 Labor split over conscription, when Premier Holman, and twenty of his supporters were expelled from the party for defying party policy and supporting conscription. Holman and his supporters joined a grand coalition with the members of the various conservative parties. By 1917, this had coalesced into the Nationalist Party of Australia, with Holman as leader. At the 1917 state election, Holman stood as a candidate for the Nationalist Party, and successfully retained his seat of Cootamundra.

The ministry covers the period from 15 November 1916 until 12 April 1920, when Holman lost his seat as serving Premier and his government was defeated at the 1920 state election by Labor's John Storey.

== Composition of ministry ==
Portfolio	Minister	Party at appointment	Term start	Term end	Term length
Premier	William Holman (Note: William Holman stepped aside as Treasurer on 30 October 1918 to be the first Premier not to hold a separate portfolio. John Fitzpatrick replaced Holman as Treasurer.)	Ex Labor	15 November 1916	12 April 1920	3 years, 149 days
Treasurer	William Holman	Ex Labor	15 November 1916	30 October 1918	1 year, 349 days
Treasurer	John Fitzpatrick	Nationalist	30 October 1918	12 April 1920	1 year, 165 days
Secretary for Mines	John Fitzpatrick	Liberal Reform	15 November 1916	12 April 1920	3 years, 149 days
Chief Secretary; Registrar of Records	Sir George Fuller (Note: George Fuller was knighted on 3 June 1919.)	Liberal Reform	15 November 1916	12 April 1920	3 years, 149 days
Attorney-General	David Hall	Ex Labor	15 November 1916	23 July 1919	2 years, 250 days
Attorney-General	John Garland KC MLC	Nationalist	23 July 1919	12 April 1920	264 days
Secretary for Lands; Minister for Forests	William Ashford	Ex Labor	15 November 1916	12 April 1920	3 years, 149 days
Secretary for Public Works; Minister for Railways	Richard Ball	Farmers and Settlers	15 November 1916	12 April 1920	3 years, 149 days
Minister of Agriculture	William Grahame (Note: Both David Hall and William Grahame resigned from the ministry, just weeks before the 1920 election, requiring a final reshuffle.)	Ex Labor	15 November 1916	14 January 1920	3 years, 60 days
Minister of Agriculture	William Ashford	Nationalist	9 February 1920	12 April 1920	63 days
Minister for Labour and Industry	George Beeby MLC / MLA (Note: George Beeby was appointed to the Legislative Council until February 1917 when he was successfully contested the election for Wagga Wagga.) (Note: George Beeby was absent from the state from 30 October 1918 until 9 June 1919, resulting in a subsequent reshuffle where he was not reappointed to the ministry.)	National Progressive	15 November 1916	23 July 1919	2 years, 250 days
Minister for Labour and Industry	Augustus James	Nationalist	23 July 1919	12 April 1920	264 days
Minister of Public Instruction	Augustus James	Liberal Reform	15 November 1916	12 April 1920	3 years, 149 days
Minister of Justice; Solicitor General	John Garland KC MLC	Liberal Reform	15 November 1916	23 July 1919	2 years, 250 days
Minister of Justice; Solicitor General	Jack FitzGerald MLC	Nationalist	23 July 1919	12 April 1920	264 days
Minister of Public Health	Jack FitzGerald MLC	Labor	15 November 1916	18 July 1919	2 years, 245 days
Minister of Public Health	David Storey	Nationalist	18 July 1919	29 January 1920	195 days
Minister of Public Health	Albert Bruntnell	Nationalist	9 February 1920	12 April 1920	63 days
Minister for Local Government	Jack FitzGerald MLC	Labor	15 November 1916	12 April 1920	3 years, 149 days
Vice-President of the Executive Council	Jack FitzGerald MLC	Labor	15 November 1916	30 July 1919	2 years, 257 days
Vice-President of the Executive Council	David Hall	Nationalist	30 July 1919	9 February 1920	194 days
Vice-President of the Executive Council	Sir George Fuller	Nationalist	9 February 1920	27 February 1920	18 days
Representative of the Government in Legislative Council	Jack FitzGerald MLC	Labor	15 November 1916	12 June 1918	1 year, 209 days
Representative of the Government in Legislative Council	John Garland KC MLC	Nationalist	12 June 1918	12 April 1920	1 year, 305 days
Minister for Housing (Note: A new portfolio of Housing was created in 1919. David Hall shifted from Attorney General as inaugural Minister, resigning six months later.)	David Hall	Nationalist	23 July 1919	9 February 1920	201 days
Minister for Housing	Charles Oakes	Nationalist	9 February 1920	12 April 1920	63 days
Minister without portfolio	Charles Oakes	Nationalist	18 July 1919	9 February 1920	206 days
Minister without portfolio (acting Minister of Public Health)	David Storey	Liberal Reform	15 November 1916	18 July 1919	2 years, 245 days
Minister without portfolio (assisting Secretary for Lands)	John Crane	Nationalist	9 February 1920	12 April 1920	63 days
Minister without portfolio (assisting Minister of Agriculture)	Arthur Grimm	Nationalist	9 February 1920	12 April 1920	63 days

Ministers are members of the Legislative Assembly unless otherwise noted.

== See also ==
- Holman Labor ministry
  - Members of Legislative Assembly
  - (1913–1917)
  - (1917–1920)
  - Members of Legislative Council
  - (1913–1917)
  - (1917–1920)

Preceded by Holman Labor ministry	Holman ministry 1916 – 1920	Succeeded by Storey ministry
