= Dooley ministry =

Dooley ministry may refer to:

- Dooley ministry (1921), the 38th ministry of the New South Wales Government, 10 October 1921–20 December 1921
- Dooley ministry (1921–1922), the 40th ministry of the New South Wales Government, 20 December 1921–13 April 1922
