= Robert Sproule =

Irish-born Australian politician

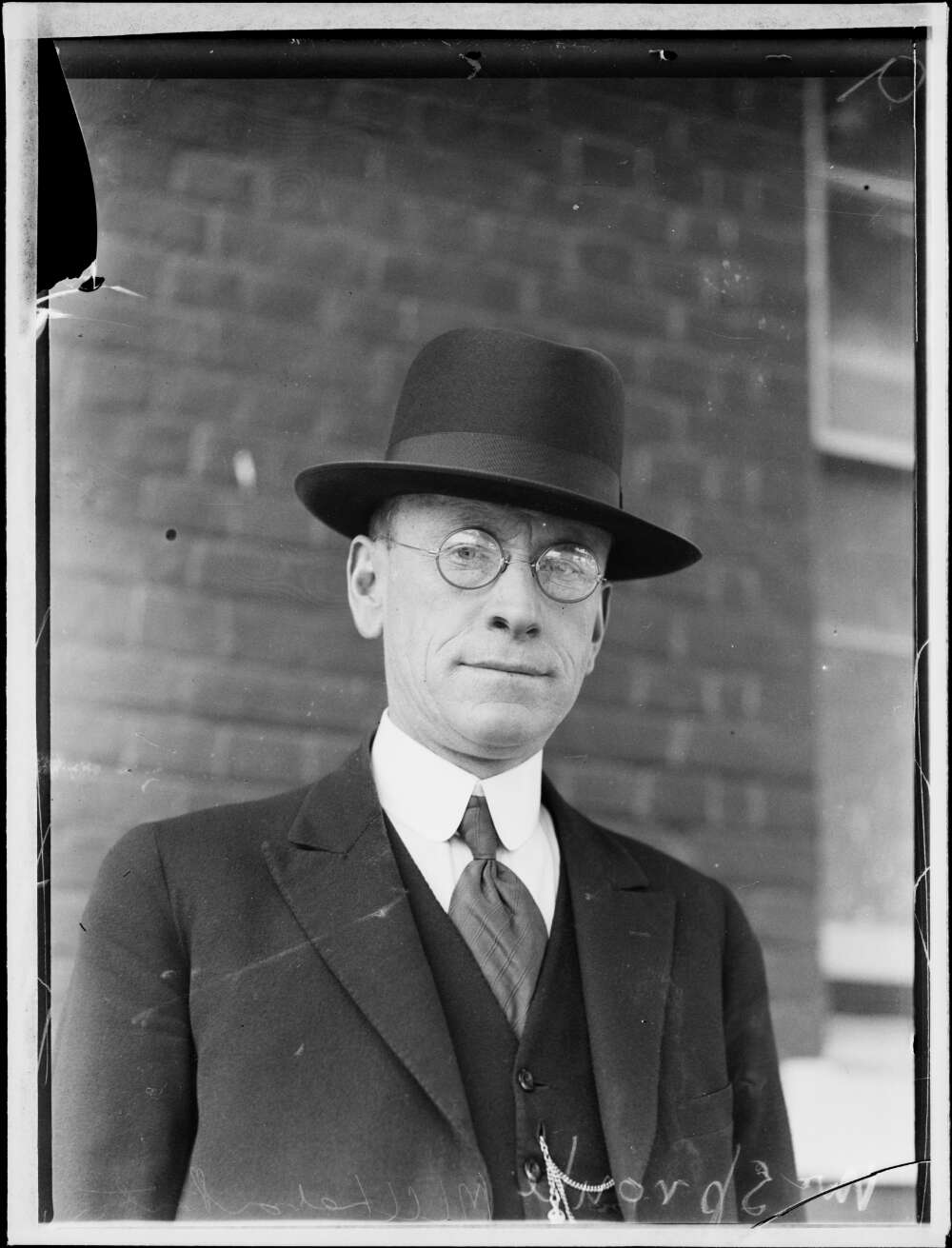
- Sproule c. 1920

Solicitor General for New South Wales
- In office 15 April 1920 – 13 April 1922
- Preceded by: John FitzGerald
- Succeeded by: Cecil Weigall

Member of the New South Wales Legislative Council
- In office 27 April 1920 – 22 April 1934

Personal details
- Born: 16 March 1881 Omagh, County Tyrone
- Died: 16 July 1948 (aged 67) Parramatta, New South Wales, Australia
- Spouse: Effie Stevenson (m. 1911)

Robert Sproule (16 March 1881 – 16 July 1948) was an Irish-born Australian public servant and politician who served as Solicitor General for New South Wales from 1920 until 1922.

== Early life ==
Sproule was born in Omagh in County Tyrone to farmer William Sproule and Mary Ann Clisdell. He attended the Crown Street Public School until he was 14, leaving to work as a correspondence clerk and bookkeeper, continuing his education at night school, He sat the public service exam in March 1899, and was appointed a junior clerk in the Petty Sessions office of the Justice Department at Goulburn, transferring to Redfern in December 1901. He passed a further examination for promotion in April 1904.

He studied at the University of Sydney, receiving his Bachelor of Arts in 1907 and a Bachelor of Law in 1913. He was a court reporter from 1912 to 1919, and was called to the bar in 1913. In 1919 he was appointed the first head of the Legal Aid office.

== Politics ==
Sproule was appointed Solicitor General in the Storey ministry on 15 April 1920, appointed as a Labor member of the Legislative Council apparently by virtue of his office in what Keith Mason described as the effective beginning of the de-politicsation of the office. The Sunday Times took a different view, describing him as the Cassius of the state ministry who had proved himself a very able conspirator for the good of the ministry. Sproule continued to hold the office in the first and second Dooley ministries. The National Advocate, which had a reputation as the mouthpiece of the Labor Party, described Sproule as having practical experience in all the courts. There is nothing to indicate that Sproule appeared in court in his role as Solicitor General, with the National Advocate emphasising his law reform and political role in administering the courts. The Sunday Times and the Barrier Miner speculated that he may be appointed a judge, however nothing came of that.

In 1927 he left the bar to become a solicitor, working with Richard Meagher.

He was expelled from Labor in July 1931 because he refused to sign the Lang pledge, which required loyalty to the Premier, Jack Lang, the state executive and the Lang plan. Despite his expulsion, Sproule continued to vote for Lang legislation.

The Legislative Council was re-constituted in 1934 to one where members were elected, not directly by the people, but by a joint sitting of the New South Wales Parliament with 60 members having a 12-year term, elected in four groups of 15 members. Sproule was one of 126 candidates however he was excluded early in the count for each of the elections.

He retired from politics and continued to work as a solicitor until his death.

== Personal life and death ==
On 15 March 1911 he married Effie Stevenson, however she died from pneumonia on 12 August 1921. Sproule died at Parramatta on 17 July 1948 (aged 67).

Political offices
Preceded by John Garland KC	Solicitor General; 1920 – 1922	Succeeded by Cecil Weigall
