= Solicitor General for New South Wales =

Second law officer for the state of New South Wales, Australia

- Incumbent; Michael Sexton SC since February 1998
- Department of Justice
- Appointer: Governor of New South Wales
- Term length: 10 years
- Inaugural holder: John Stephen
- Formation: 8 August 1824
- Website: NSW Department of Justice

Solicitor General for New South Wales, known informally as the Solicitor General, is one of the Law Officers of the Crown, and the deputy of the Attorney General. They can exercise the powers of the Attorney General in the Attorney General's absence. The Solicitor General acts alongside the Crown Advocate, and Crown Solicitor, and serves as one of the legal and constitutional advisers of the Crown and its government in the Australian state of New South Wales.

The Solicitor General is addressed in court as "Mr Solicitor" or "Ms Solicitor". Despite the title, the position is usually held by a barrister, and since 1925 has been a King or Queen's Counsel or Senior Counsel. Previously a political appointment like the Attorney General is today, it has been separate from parliament since 1922 and since 1969 the Solicitor General has been a statutory office connected with the Department of Justice.

== Modern office and function ==
The Solicitor General operates under the provisions of the Solicitor General Act 1969. The retirement age is set at 75. The Solicitor General acts as Counsel for the Crown in the High Court of Australia and other courts, and advises the Attorney General on civil and criminal matters, including issues of constitutional law. Until 1987, the Solicitor General had the power to initiate Crown appeals at the Court of Criminal Appeal in NSW, it then became the responsibility of the Director of Public Prosecutions.

While John Plunkett was the first NSW Barrister to be appointed a Queen's Counsel, this was on 6 June 1856 after he had retired as Attorney General. The first person who was a Queen's Counsel at the time of his appointment as Solicitor General was John Hargrave QC. Cecil Weigall was appointed Solicitor General in 1922 and appointed King's Counsel in 1925. Harold Snelling QC was a Queen's Counsel at the time of his appointment.

== History ==
=== Colonial official ===
The office of Solicitor General was created in 1824 following the inquiry by John Bigge between 1819 and 1821 into the colonies of NSW and Van Diemen's Land. Bigge's 1823 report on judicial establishments recommended the appointment of a barrister as attorney-general. Bigge set out the primary duty of the attorney-general as being the preparation of indictments and informations and prosecuting them in court. The attorney-general would have discretion whether or not to charge a person. Bigge did not directly recommend the appointment of a solicitor-general, but rather that two English barristers should be encouraged to practice in the colony.

John Stephen was appointed as the first Solicitor-General in August 1824, six months after the appointment of the first Attorney-General, Saxe Bannister. Stephen's role was to assist the Attorney-General as required and cover any absence of the Attorney-General. The duties allocated to Bannister formalised the proposals of Bigge. In addition to the preparation and prosecution of criminal charges, Bannister's duties included acting for the Crown in civil matters, overseeing the preparation of Crown land grants, giving legal advice to the Governor and Government departments and drafting acts, proclamations and Government Orders. The Attorney-General was also considered to have the common law duties and powers exercisable by British Law Officer. The Attorney-General was not appointed to determine small claims, and instead that role that was given to Stephen and in a separate capacity as Commissioner of the Courts of Request. Bannister's salary was £1,200 a year. Stephen received no salary as Solicitor-General, and a salary of £600 a year as Commissioner of the Courts of Request, raised to £800 within a year. The name "Solicitor-General" is taken from the title of the deputy of the Attorney General for England and Wales, first appointed in 1461, with the name "solicitor general" becoming standard from 1536. Whereas the New South Wales position was initially filled by a barrister who was not a parliamentarian (until 1851), the British position is by convention filled by a member of parliament.

One of the first cases in which Stephen argued as Solicitor-General, saw him appearing for the Magistrates of Sydney in opposition to the Attorney-General concerning trial by jury. D'Arcy Wentworth was one of the leaders of an 1819 petition seeking both trial by jury and the establishment of representative government. Bigge had recommended against trial by a civilian jury, and the House of Commons had narrowly defeated a proposal that juries be introduced for criminal trials, prior to passing the New South Wales Act 1823 which prescribed military juries for criminal trials before the Supreme Court. Bannister advised Governor Brisbane that the establishment of a Court of Quarter Sessions required the same composition as in England, including a civilian jury. Stephens disagreed in a written advice to Wentworth who was one of the Magistrates. Castles describes the case that followed as a fabricated cause, set in train by Wentworth, in which the Attorney-General sought an order requiring the magistrates to assemble juries. Chief Justice Forbes held that civilian juries were required for Court of Quarter Sessions.

In 1828 there was a dispute between Alexander Baxter and John Sampson as to their respective duties. Governor Darling resolved the dispute by making the Attorney General primarily responsible for criminal prosecutions and drafting legislation, while the Solicitor General was primarily responsible for civil matters.

While a Legislative Council was created in 1823 in which all members were appointed, the Attorney-General was not one of the appointed members of the council until 1829 when Alexander Baxter was appointed. When John Plunkett was promoted to Attorney General in 1836, cost-cutting measures meant he was not replaced as Solicitor General. Roger Therry was often Plunkett's junior, including in the Myall Creek massacre trials, although he was never appointed to the role of Solicitor General. The absence of Plunkett from 1841 resulted in Therry being appointed acting Attorney General and William à Beckett as acting Solicitor General. William Manning was the first Solicitor-General to be appointed to the Legislative Council in February 1851.

=== Political office ===
Representative government was introduced in New South Wales in 1856 and the Solicitor General became an official member of the government, one of 5 offices of profit under the Crown that were permitted to be held by a member of the Legislative Assembly. In addition to the work in and out of court, the Solicitor-General took on additional legislative and administrative responsibilities, including representing the government in debates on legal matters and drafting bills. While there were two legal officers in the ministry, there was however only one portfolio, the law officers of the crown, with the Attorney General and Solicitor General jointly responsible for its administration.

In 1873 the Attorney General Edward Butler resigned and the Solicitor General Joseph Innes was promoted to first law officer. Innes was not however replaced as Solicitor General. Instead the Premier Henry Parkes appointed a solicitor, George Allen, to the new Ministry of Justice and Public Instruction whose responsibilities included the administration of the courts, sheriff and coroner. In 1884 the constitution was amended to remove the dormant office of Solicitor General from the list of paid ministerial offices that could be held by a member of the Legislative Assembly.

The Minister of Justice, Richard O'Connor was temporarily appointed Solicitor General in 1893 to allow him to deputise for the Attorney General while Edmund Barton was visiting Canada. Similarly George Reid was temporarily appointed to the role so that he could deputise for Jack Want while he was away from the colony. This overcame the constitutional limitation that the Attorney General's prerogative powers as first law officer could not be delegated to another minister.

In October 1900 the Secretary of the Attorney-General's department, Hugh Pollock, was appointed to the role. This does not appear to have been controversial at the time with The Evening News describing the appointment as purely a formal one. Pollock was again appointed in July 1901, however on this occasion the appointment was controversial because

- Pollock was a public servant, not a member of parliament and not responsible to parliament;
- While Pollock had been called to the bar in 1890, he had not practised as a barrister and his appointment as the second law officer saw the law almanac list him as second in seniority behind the Attorney General;
- The appointment was at the Governor's pleasure such that the role did not fall with the fall of the government, nor could he be removed from the role by the legislative assembly.

Pollock resigned in October 1904 and was appointed a Crown Prosecutor.

The role was again revived in December 1909 in the Wade ministry. Charles Wade was initially appointed Premier, Attorney General and Minister of Justice, however 2 months later John Garland was appointed to the justice portfolio and as Solicitor General to enable him to assist the Attorney General. Garland was appointed King's Counsel during his term in office. Five months into the McGowan ministry a second public servant, Walter Bevan was appointed to the role. Bevan had been a crown prosecutor for more than 20 years and unlike Pollock, his appointment does not appear to have been controversial, with opposition MLA Gus James describing Bevan as a satisfactory man, well skilled in criminal law. In addition to his principle role in conducting litigation, Bevan was appointed to provide legal advice to the members of the Legislative Council. David Hall was appointed Minister of Justice in April 1912 and it was initially intended that Bevan would retain his role as Solicitor General. Two days later however Hall was appointed to replace Bevan in the role. The role became dormant again in the first Holman ministry when Hall replaced Holman as Attorney General. Holman was briefly appointed to the role in 1915 to deputise for Hall.

The role was revived as a political office in the Holman Nationalist ministry, held in conjunction with the portfolio of Justice and as a separate portfolio in the Storey, first and second Dooley ministries, before being abolished as a political office in the Fuller ministry in 1922.

=== Public servant ===
In 1922 the Attorney General Thomas Bavin was planning to take holidays and Cecil Weigall, the Assistant Law Officer and Crown Prosecutor in the Attorney General's department, was appointed Solicitor General to perform routine statutory duties that would otherwise need to be performed by the Attorney General. Weigall was appointed aged 52 and went on to serve for more than 30 years, predominantly appearing in criminal prosecutions and appeals. When Weigall retired in 1953 Harold Snelling QC was appointed to replace him. Snelling's experience was in civil law rather than criminal, particularly in crown fiscal matters, representing the state in the Supreme Court, High Court and Privy Council. A significant change during the tenure of Snelling was the passage of the Solicitor General Act 1969, which converted the role from a public servant to a statutory office.

=== Statutory office ===
The purpose of making the role a statutory office was to formalise the manner in which the role had been performed since 1922 and to permit the Attorney General to delegate functions and for the Solicitor General to act in the absence of the Attorney General. The bill was not controversial and was supported by the opposition. The act had a number of qualifications to the appointment, including that the person must not be a Minister of the Crown. Initially the person was required to be a Queen's Counsel, however this was removed in 1993 when the appointment of Queen's Counsel was abolished in NSW and instead the person must be "an Australian lawyer of at least 7 years’ standing". Both appointments since 1993 have been Senior Counsel. The retirement age was initially 70, increased to 72 and is currently 75.

== Office-holders ==
=== Solicitors General, 1824–1922 ===
#	Image	Solicitor General	Status	Ministry	Term start	Term end	Time in office	Notes
1		John Stephen	Government official, not a member of Legislative Council	Prior to responsible government	11 August 1824	17 August 1825	1 year, 6 days	
		James Holland	Government official, not a member of Legislative Council	Prior to responsible government	Appointed in 1826 but never sworn in.			
2		William Foster	Government official, not a member of Legislative Council	Prior to responsible government	3 September 1827	1 April 1828	211 days	
3		John Sampson	Government official, not a member of Legislative Council	Prior to responsible government	15 March 1828	27 October 1829	1 year, 226 days	
		Edward MacDowell	Government official, not a member of Legislative Council	Prior to responsible government	Appointed in 1830 but failed to take up his duties promptly			
4		John Plunkett (Note: Plunkett was appointed to the Legislative Council on 19 April 1836 when he became Acting Attorney-General.)	Government official, not a member of Legislative Council	Prior to responsible government	14 June 1832	16 September 1836	4 years, 94 days	
5		William à Beckett	Government official, not a member of Legislative Council	Prior to responsible government	20 March 1841	30 August 1844	3 years, 163 days	
6		William Manning	Government official, not a member of Legislative Council	Prior to responsible government	31 August 1844	11 January 1848	3 years, 133 days	
(2)		William Foster	Government official, not a member of Legislative Council	Prior to responsible government	12 January 1848	19 November 1849	1 year, 311 days	
(6)		William Manning	Government official, appointed MLC from 1851, no party	Prior to responsible government	20 November 1849	5 June 1856	6 years, 198 days	
7		John Darvall	MLA, no party	Donaldson	6 June 1856	25 August 1856	80 days	
8		Alfred Lutwyche	MLC, no party	Cowper (1)	12 September 1856	2 October 1856	20 days	
(7)		John Darvall	MLA, no party	Parker	3 October 1856	23 May 1857	232 days	
9		Edward Wise	MLC, no party	Parker	23 May 1857	7 September 1857	107 days	
(8)		Alfred Lutwyche	MLC, no party	Cowper (2)	7 September 1857	14 November 1858	1 year, 68 days	
10		William Dalley	MLA, no party	Cowper (2)	15 November 1858	11 February 1859	88 days	
11		John Hargrave QC	MLC, no party	Cowper (2)	21 February 1859	26 October 1859	1 year, 39 days	
11		John Hargrave QC	MLC, no party	Forster	3 November 1859	31 March 1860	1 year, 39 days	
11		John Hargrave QC	MLC, no party	Cowper (3)	1 August 1863	15 October 1863	75 days	
12		Peter Faucett	MLA, no party	Martin (1)	16 October 1863	2 February 1865	1 year, 109 days	
(11)		John Hargrave QC	MLC, no party	Cowper (4)	3 February 1865	21 June 1865	138 days	
13		Robert Isaacs	MLA, no party	Martin (2)	22 January 1866	26 October 1868	2 years, 278 days	
14		Joshua Josephson	MLA, no party	Robertson (2)	27 October 1868	9 September 1869	317 days	
15		Julian Salomons	MLC, (Note: Salomons was not appointed to the Legislative Council until 11 August 1870, 7 months after his appointment as Solicitor General.) no party	Robertson (2)	18 December 1869	15 December 1870	362 days	
15		Julian Salomons	MLC, no party	Cowper (5)	18 December 1869	15 December 1870	362 days	
16		William Windeyer	MLA, no party	Martin (3)	16 December 1870	13 May 1872	1 year, 149 days	
17		Joseph Innes	MLA, no party	Parkes (1)	14 May 1872	19 November 1873	1 year, 189 days	
18		Richard O'Connor	MLC, Protectionist	Dibbs (3)	19 July 1893	13 September 1893	56 days	(Note: The office was not filled however Richard O'Connor and George Reid were temporarily appointed to allow them to deputise for the Attorney-General in his absence.)
19		George Reid KC	MLA, Free Trade	Reid	21 December 1894	5 March 1895	74 days	
19		George Reid KC	MLA, Free Trade	Reid	19 December 1895	20 April 1896	123 days	
19		George Reid KC	MLA, Free Trade	Reid	22 December 1896	9 February 1897	49 days	
19		George Reid KC	MLA, Free Trade	Reid	27 April 1898	7 October 1898	163 days	
19		George Reid KC	MLA, Free Trade	Reid	3 January 1899	1 May 1899	118 days	
20		Hugh Pollock	Public servant, not a member of Parliament (Note: Pollock's appointment was controversial because he was a public servant as Secretary of the Attorney-General's department and had never practiced as a barrister.)	See; Waddell; Carruthers	22 July 1901	6 October 1904	3 years, 76 days	
21		John Garland	MLC, Liberal Reform	Wade	21 December 1909	20 October 1910	303 days	
22		Walter Bevan	Public servant, not a member of Parliament	McGowen	15 March 1911	4 April 1912	1 year, 20 days	
23		David Hall	MLC, Labor	McGowen; Holman (1)	4 April 1912	28 January 1914	1 year, 301 days	
24		William Holman	MLA, Labor	Holman (1)	19 January 1915	6 February 1915	18 days	
(21)		John Garland KC	MLC, Nationalist	Holman (2)	16 November 1916	23 July 1919	2 years, 249 days	
25		Jack FitzGerald	MLC, Nationalist	Holman (2)	23 July 1919	12 April 1920	264 days	
26		Robert Sproule	MLC, Labor	Storey; Dooley (1) (2)	15 April 1920	13 April 1922	1 year, 363 days	
27		Cecil Weigall QC	Public Servant	Appointed by Fuller (2)	27 December 1922	5 May 1953	30 years, 130 days	
28		Harold Snelling QC	Public Servant	Appointed by Cahill (2)	18 August 1953	December 1969	21 years, 25 days	
28		Harold Snelling QC	Statutory office	Appointed by Askin (3)	December 1969	12 September 1974	21 years, 25 days	
29		Reginald Marr QC	Statutory office	Appointed by Askin (6)	September 1974	March 1978	3 years, 181 days	
30		Gregory Sullivan QC	Statutory office	Appointed by Wran (2)	February 1979	February 1981	2 years, 0 days	
31		Mary Gaudron QC	Statutory office	Appointed by Wran (3)	16 February 1981	February 1987	5 years, 350 days	
32		Keith Mason QC	Statutory office	Appointed by Unsworth	February 1987	February 1997	10 years, 0 days	
33		Leslie Katz SC	Statutory office	Appointed by Carr (1)	July 1997	September 1998	1 year, 91 days	
34		Michael Sexton SC	Statutory office	Appointed by Carr (2)	October 1998	present	27 years, 342 days	

=== See also ===
- Solicitor-General of Australia
- Solicitor-General of Victoria
