= Michael Sexton =

Michael Sexton may refer to:

- Michael Sexton (footballer) (born 1971), Australian rules footballer
- Michael H. Sexton (1863–1937), American baseball executive
- Michael Sexton (lawyer), solicitor general for New South Wales
- Mike Sexton (1947–2020), American poker player
- Michael Sexton, president of Trump University (2005–2011)
