= Campbell Carmichael =

Australian politician and soldier

Campbell Carmichael MC
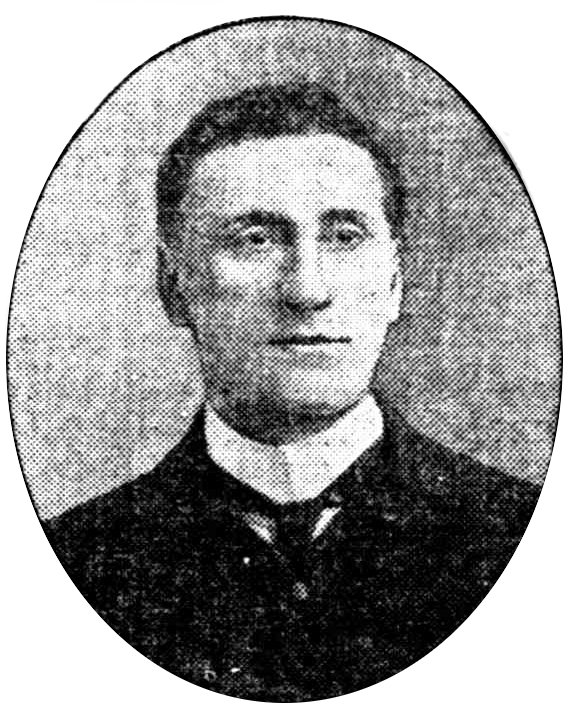

Minister of Public Instruction
- In office 1 March 1912 – 5 March 1915
- Preceded by: Frederick Flowers
- Succeeded by: William Holman
- In office 11 September – 26 November 1911
- Preceded by: George Beeby
- Succeeded by: Frederick Flowers

Minister for Labour and Industry
- In office 10 December 1912 – 29 June 1913
- Preceded by: George Beeby
- Succeeded by: James McGowen
- In office 11 September – 26 November 1911
- Preceded by: George Beeby
- Succeeded by: George Beeby

Treasurer of New South Wales
- In office 17 April – 5 May 1912
- Preceded by: John Dacey
- Succeeded by: John Cann

Member of the New South Wales Legislative Assembly for Leichhardt
- In office 10 September 1907 – 18 February 1920
- Preceded by: Robert Booth
- Succeeded by: District abolished

Personal details
- Born: 19 September 1871 Hobart, Tasmania
- Died: 15 January 1953 (aged 81) Darlinghurst, New South Wales
- Party: Nationalist Party (after 1922)
- Other political affiliations: Labor (to 1919); Soldiers and Citizens Party (1919–22)

Military service
- Allegiance: Australia
- Branch/service: Australian Imperial Force
- Years of service: 1915–1919
- Rank: Captain
- Unit: 36th Battalion
- Battles/wars: First World War
- Awards: Military Cross

Ambrose Campbell Carmichael, MC (19 September 1871 – 15 January 1953) was an Australian politician, soldier and accountant, a member of the New South Wales Legislative Assembly for 12 years and a minister in the McGowen and Holman Labor governments.

== Early life ==
Carmichael was born in Hobart, Tasmania, to shipping agent William Carmichael and Emma Willson, both Scottish-born. He was educated at Hobart and then held a variety of occupations, including coaching in Brisbane and farming on the Lachlan River, where he became involved in the Farmers' and Settlers' Association of New South Wales. Around 1893 he married Mabel Pillinger at Lake Cargelligo. In around 1900 he established a business in Sydney.

== Political career ==
In 1904 Carmichael joined Labor and worked on George Beeby's unsuccessful campaign for Leichhardt at the 1904 election. He was the Labor candidate for Leichhardt in 1907 and he was successful, defeating the sitting Liberal Reform member Robert Booth, with a margin of 485 votes (6.1%). He was appointed an honorary minister in 1910 in the McGowen ministry, assuming the Public Instruction and Labour and Industry portfolios in 1911. He was dropped from the ministry in November 1911, but was returned as Minister of Public Instruction from March 1912, briefly also serving as Treasurer from April to May 1912 and adding Labour and Industry from December 1912 until June 1913. He retained the portfolio of Public Instruction in the first Holman ministry, until March 1915, when he resigned over a dispute concerning seniority in the cabinet.

In November 1915 he started a successful recruiting campaign for 1,000 recruits to join him in the Australian Imperial Force for the First World War, referred to as "Carmichael's thousand". He enlisted as a private in January 1916, serving in the 36th Battalion. He was awarded the Military Cross for action at Houplines in 1917, returning to the frontline, attaining the rank of captain. He returned to Sydney in February 1918 and spoke to the Labor executive, explaining that while he was in favour of conscription it had been defeated in two referendums and was a dead issue. He ran another recruitment campaign to raise a second "Carmichael's thousand", which left Sydney in June 1918, arriving in France in late September when the war was ending.

He drifted from Labor and "machine politics" and in March 1919 formed the People's Party of Soldiers and Citizens. The party fielded 30 candidates in 10 districts at the 1920 election, with Carmichael standing as a candidate for the five-member seat of Balmain. None of the party's candidates were elected with Carmichael coming closest, missing out by a margin of 426 votes (1.4%).

== Later life ==
Carmichael retired from public life and became a public accountant. He wrote to his former colleague William Ashford in 1921 stating that the prosecution of Ashford in a Royal Commission was in his opinion, a "damned dirty piece of political malice" that sickened him of present-day politics. After the failure of his party he joined the Nationalist Party in 1922 but did not stand for election again. His wife Mabel died in 1931, and his second marriage, which took place in 1934 in Sydney, was to Olive Thorngate née Weston. He died at Darlinghurst on 15 January 1953 (aged 81). He had no children from either marriage and his second wife, Olive, died 5 days after him.

New South Wales Legislative Assembly
| Preceded by Robert Booth | Member for Leichhardt; 1907–1920 | District abolished |
