= Michael Sexton (lawyer) =

Solicitor General of New South Wales

Michael Sexton SC

Solicitor General for New South Wales
- Incumbent
- Assumed office 1998
- Appointed by: Governor of New South Wales
- Preceded by: Leslie Katz

Personal details
- Education: University of Melbourne, University of Virginia

Michael Sexton, SC (Born 24 September 1946) is the current Solicitor General for New South Wales, having served in the office since 1998. After graduating from the University of Melbourne and University of Virginia, Sexton worked as an academic lawyer before joining the New South Wales Bar in 1984. He is the author of Australian Defamation Law and Practice, and On the Edges of History: A Memoir of Law, Book and Politics in addition to books on Australian history. Sexton is married with one child.

== Early life ==
Sexton was born in 1946 in Melbourne, and spent his childhood in Surrey Hills. After secondary school, Sexton studied law at the University of Melbourne, from where he graduated with a Bachelor of Laws in 1969.

== Career ==
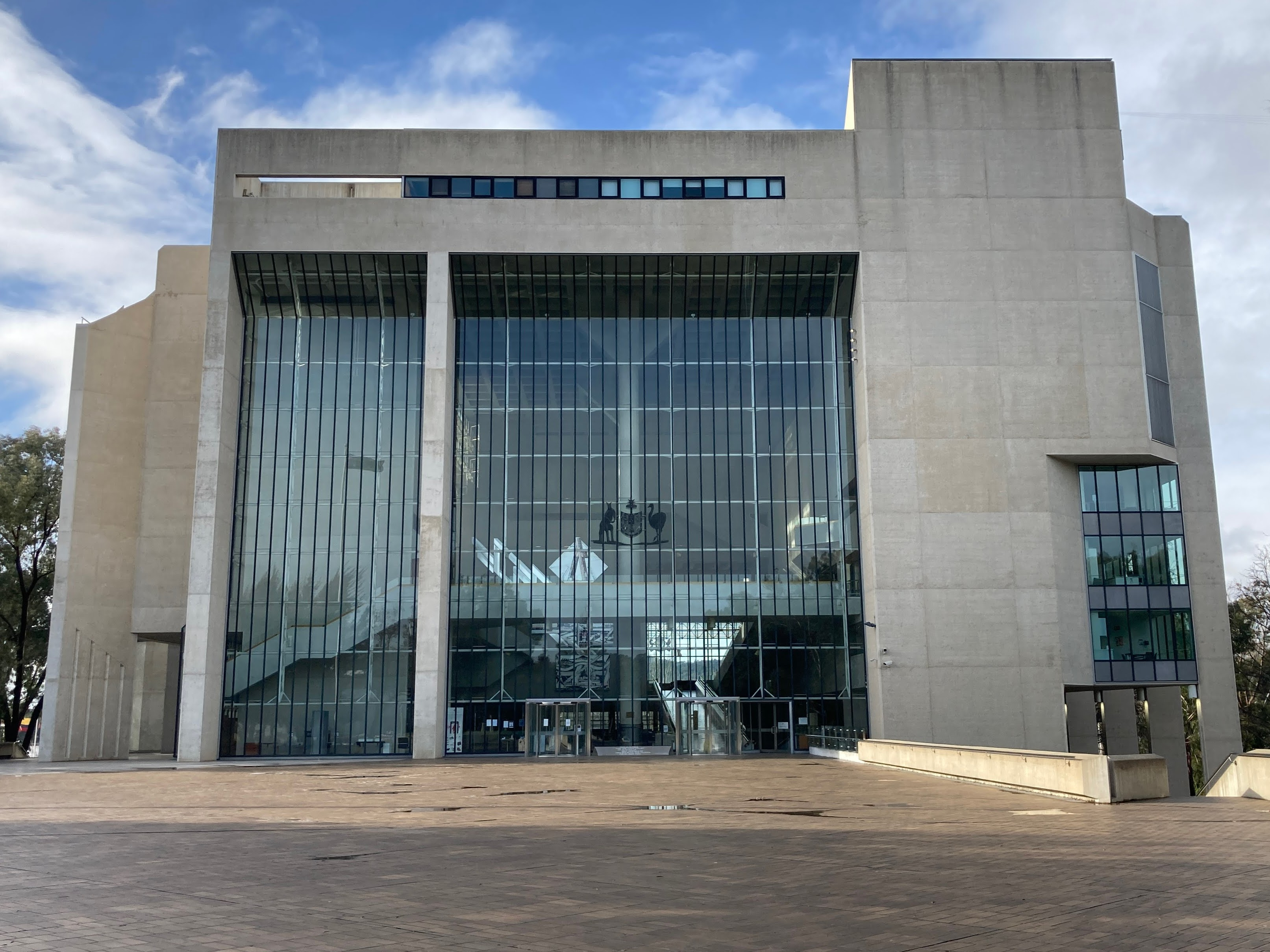
The High Court of Australia, where Sexton commenced his legal career

After his studies, Sexton then worked at the High Court of Australia, where he was an Associate to judge Sir Edward McTiernan for one year at the Court, and then for a further six months in London where McTiernan sat on the Judicial committee of the Privy Council. Sexton describes his time at the Court as one which allowed him to "[see] the best advocates in every jurisdiction...[the] experience [gave me] an idea of the best of the law and the sort of standards that [one tries to aim] for in future years". Following his time at the Court, Sexton attended the University of Virginia and graduated with a Master of Laws.

Sexton then worked for the Attorney-General, and in 1976 became a lecturer at the University of New South Wales, eventually becoming a senior lecturer.

Sexton was called to the Bar in 1984 when he was thirty eight years old. In 1998, Sexton was appointed Senior Counsel.

=== Solicitor-General of New South Wales ===
Appointed Solicitor-General in 1998 by the Carr government, Sexton is second to the Attorney-General in the hierarchy of New South Wales law officers, meaning he is the chief legal adviser to the government of the day, arguing cases in court on behalf of the state.

=== Politics ===
Sexton was previously active in the Australian Labor Party, where in 1982 he ran for preselection in the now abolished federal seat of Phillip, east of Sydney. Sexton "knew [he could not] win that ballot" but does not regret the attempt. He ceased being active in the party in 1990, and provided advice to then Premier of New South Wales Bob Carr, whose government eventually appointed him Solicitor-General.

== Personal life ==
Sexton has a wife, Gae, with whom he has a son named Jack.

== Publications ==
- The Legal Mystique: The Role of Lawyers in Australian Society
- Dissenting Opinions
- On the Edges of History: a Memoir of Law, Books, and Politics
- Illusions of Power (later updated and released as The Great Crash)
