= Reginald Marr =

Australian boxer and lawyer (1917-1999)

Reginald Marr DFC OAM QC

Solicitor General for New South Wales
- In office September 1974 – March 1978
- Preceded by: Harold Snelling
- Succeeded by: Gregory Sullivan

Personal details
- Born: 12 March 1917 Sydney, Australia
- Died: 16 November 1999 (aged 82)

Military service
- Allegiance: Australia
- Branch/service: Royal Australian Air Force; Citizens Military Force
- Rank: Colonel
- Unit: Australian Army Legal Corps
- Battles/wars: Second World War
- Awards: Distinguished Flying Cross; Medal of the Order of Australia

Reginald Joseph Marr (12 March 1917 – 16 November 1999) was an Australian lawyer and military officer. He was a Queen's Counsel who served as the Solicitor General for New South Wales (1974–78), and held the rank of colonel in the Australian Army Legal Corps.

== Early life ==
Marr was born in the Eastern Suburbs of Sydney on 12 March 1917, into one of the pioneering engineering families of New South Wales (Gordon Marr & Sons & E.A.Marr Cranes), as the second youngest child into a family of two girls and six boys. He was educated at Waverley College with his two elder brothers, Ron and John. He was senior prefect, school boxing featherweight champion, and vice captain of the College (1933–1934).

Marr continued his studies as a law student at the University of Sydney and the Barristers Admission Board while serving his Articles of clerkship with two firms of Sydney solicitors. He continued to be active in the sporting arena, and in 1935 was a representative in the Australian Universities Boxing Championships. In 1938 he was awarded a Sydney University Blue in boxing but did not actually receive the award till 1995 as it was withheld in 1938, as Reg was not a member of the Sports' Union. He was a foundation member of the Sydney University Ice Hockey Club, and enlisted with Sydney University Regiment and Royal Australian Engineers.

== Second World War ==
Marr was admitted to the bar of New South Wales on 14 March 1941, after enlistment in the RAAF in 1940. He underwent flying training at Narrandera and Point Cook where he graduated with wings and a commission. After further training on seaplanes and flying boats at Rathmines, he completed two tours of operations in the South West Pacific area with Nos 11, 20 and 43 Squadrons RAAF, during which he completed 846 hours of operational flying and took part in 45 sorties, including 17 strikes against the enemy. He next served with Trans Pacific Ferry Flight and then as an Operational Training Unit Flying instructor at Rathmines. He was awarded the Distinguished Flying Cross following a difficult rescue of a Beaufighter crew from the Timor Sea. The RAAF Air Board Citation reads in part, "Flight Lieutenant Marr has proved himself to be a consistently conscientious, efficient and reliable captain of Catalina Aircraft, who can always be depended upon to carry out his task regardless of difficulty." The award was gazetted on 9 March 1945.

== Career and later life ==
Marr took up practice at the Bar, after demobilisation from RAAF on 20 February 1946. He was appointed one of Her Majesty's Counsel in December 1972, and Solicitor General of New South Wales in September 1974. He retired early from this appointment in March 1978, and returned to private practice at the Bar, where he formed and headed a floor of Barristers in Garfield Barwick Chambers. Marr was lecturer for New South Wales Bar Council on "Conduct of Criminal Trials" (1974–1986) and author of the work of the same name, currently in use for Bar Council lectures. In 1998, Marr was awarded a Medal of the Order of Australia in recognition of his services to veterans' affairs and the Christian Brothers College, Waverley.

After the war Marr enlisted into the Australian Army Legal Corps, and was a Consultant to director, Army Legal Services, Australian Army Legal Corps with the rank of colonel.

Marr was Honorary Colonel of the Waverley College Cadet Unit until his death on 16 November 1999, a period in excess of 40 years.

Legal offices
Preceded by Harold Snelling	Solicitor General for New South Wales; 1974–1978	Succeeded by Gregory Sullivan
