= Keith Mason (judge) =

Australian judge

The Honourable Keith Mason AC KC

President of the New South Wales Court of Appeal
- In office 4 February 1997 – 30 May 2008
- Preceded by: Dennis Mahoney
- Succeeded by: James Allsop

Solicitor General for New South Wales
- In office February 1987 – February 1997
- Preceded by: Mary Gaudron KC
- Succeeded by: Leslie Katz SC

Personal details
- Born: 18 February 1947 (age 79)
- Citizenship: Australia
- Spouse: Anne Mason
- Children: David and Priya Mason
- Parent: Edward Mason, merchant mariner (father)
- Relatives: Louise Gardiner - Sister
- Education: University of Sydney
- Profession: Judge

Keith Mason, AC KC (born 18 February 1947) is a former President of the Court of Appeal of New South Wales, the highest civil court in the State of New South Wales, Australia, which forms part of the Australian court hierarchy, serving between 1997 and 30 May 2008.

Mason is currently the chairman of the New South Wales Electoral Commission.

== Biography ==
Mason graduated from the University of Sydney with degrees in arts (1967) and law (1970). The university awarded him an honorary doctorate of laws in 2005.

Mason was admitted as a solicitor in 1970 and to the New South Wales Bar in 1972. He was appointed as a Queen's Counsel (QC) in 1981. He became president of the Court of Appeal in 1997. Mason was chairman of the New South Wales Law Reform Commission from 1985 to 1987 and 1989 to 1990. He was Solicitor-General of NSW from 1987 to 1997. Mason became president of the Children's Medical Research Foundation in 1995.

Mason has also been a justice of the Supreme Court of Fiji.

In 2006, he joined the Faculty of Law at the University of New South Wales as a Professorial Visiting Fellow. He is also a senior fellow at Melbourne Law School.

For many years Mason has been chancellor of the Anglican Diocese of Armidale. He is also the president of the National Appellate Tribunal, the highest ecclesiastical court of appeals in the Anglican Church of Australia.

Mason was appointed a Companion of the Order of Australia in 2003 for service to the law and legal scholarship, to the judicial system in New South Wales, to the Anglican Church, and to the community.

== Honours ==
Mason was appointed a Companion of the Order of Australia (AC) in 2003 for "service to the law and legal scholarship, to the judicial system in New South Wales, to the Anglican Church, and to the community".

== Publications ==
Mason is co-author of Restitution Law in Australia (1995) with Professor John Carter, as well as the second edition, Mason & Carter's Restitution Law in Australia (2008).

Legal offices
Preceded by Dennis Mahoney	President of the New South Wales Court of Appeal; 1997–2008	Succeeded by James Allsop
Preceded by Mary Gaudron KC	Solicitor General for New South Wales; 1987–1997	Succeeded by Leslie Katz SC
