= John Stephen (New South Wales judge) =

New South Wales solicitor-general and judge

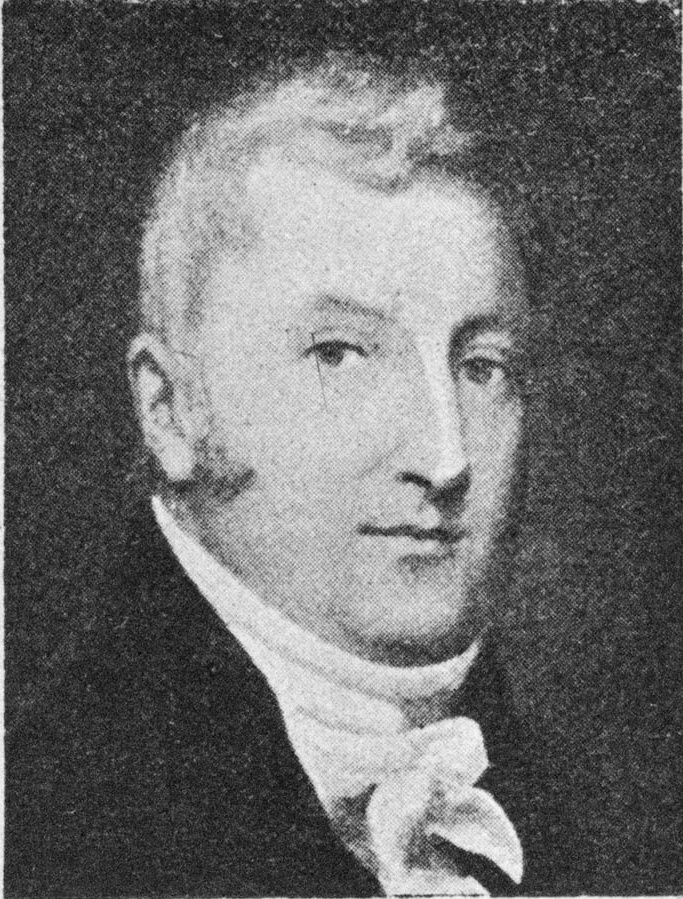
- Born: 4 July 1771; Poole, Dorset, England
- Died: 21 December 1833 (aged 62); Belfield, New South Wales
- Occupation: Supreme court judge
- Years active: 1826–1832

John Stephen (1771–1833) was appointed solicitor-general and judge of the Supreme Court of New South Wales in the Colony of New South Wales.

== Career ==
Stephen built up a legal practice as an attorney and barrister in Basseterre, Saint Kitts and Nevis. Stephen returned to England, where he lost on some bad investments, so then returned to Basseterre, but was unable to re-establish his previously profitable practice. His nephew James Stephen, who was permanent under-secretary of state for the colonies, recommended Stephen for appointment in the Colony of New South Wales. He was appointed the first Solicitor General for New South Wales in 1824, serving until August 1825 when he was appointed an additional judge of the Supreme Court of New South Wales. Stephen resigned from the Supreme Court in December 1932 due to ill health and died on 21 December 1833, at Clareville, described as his country house, in what is now Belfield.

== Family ==
Stephen was the son of James Stephen, from Aberdeen, Scotland, and Sibella Milner, of Poole, Dorsetshire. Stephen and his wife Mary Anne, née Pasmore, had six boys, and three girls. The Stephen family became a prominent legal dynasty in Australia. Of his sons, Sir Alfred served as Chief Justice of New South Wales, while Sidney served on the Supreme Court of New Zealand. His nephew James served on the Supreme Court of Victoria, while his grandson, Sir Henry and great-grandson Edward served on the Supreme Court of New South Wales.

== See also ==
- List of judges of the Supreme Court of New South Wales
