= McGowen ministry =

34th New South Wales government ministry led by James McGowen

- 34th Cabinet of the State of New South Wales

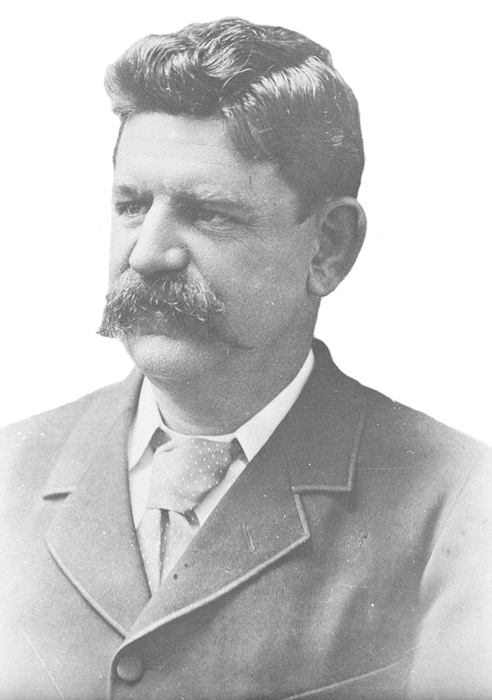
- Premier James McGowen
- Date formed: 21 October 1910
- Date dissolved: 29 June 1913

People and organisations
- Monarch: George V
- Governor: Lord Chelmsford / Sir Gerald Strickland
- Head of government: James McGowen
- No. of ministers: 11
- Member party: Labor
- Status in legislature: Majority government
- Opposition party: Liberal Reform
- Opposition leader: Charles Wade

History
- Election: 1910 New South Wales election
- Outgoing election: 1913 New South Wales election
- Predecessor: Wade ministry
- Successor: Holman Labor ministry

The McGowen ministry was the 34th ministry of the New South Wales Government, and was led by the 18th Premier, James McGowen. This ministry marks the first Labor ministry in the state of New South Wales.

McGowen was elected to the New South Wales Legislative Assembly in 1891, serving until 1917, before being appointed to the Legislative Council. He succeeded in defeating the government of Charles Wade at the 1910 state election and was commissioned to form government by Lord Chelmsford, Governor of New South Wales.

In March 1911 Walter Bevan, a public servant employed as a Crown prosecutor, was appointed Solicitor General, however he was not a member of parliament, nor was this a cabinet role. In April 1912 David Hall resigned his seat in the House of Representatives was appointed to the Legislative Council and as Minister of Justice on 2 April 1912. It was initially intended that Bevan would retain his role as Solicitor General, however two days later however Hall was appointed to replace Bevan in the role.

The ministry covers the period from 21 October 1910 until 29 June 1913, when McGowen resigned due to his health and misjudgment in attempting to settle a gasworkers strike and was succeeded by his deputy, William Holman.

== Composition of ministry ==
The composition of the ministry was announced by Premier McGowen on 21 October 1910.

Portfolio	Minister	Party	Term start	Term end	Term length
Premier	James McGowen	Labor	21 October 1910	29 June 1913	2 years, 251 days
Treasurer; Collector of Internal Revenue	James McGowen	Labor	21 October 1910	26 November 1911	1 year, 36 days
Treasurer; Collector of Internal Revenue	John Dacey (Note: John Dacey died on 11 April 1912, resulting in another reshuffle in McGowen's senior Ministers.)	Labor	27 November 1911	11 April 1912	136 days
Treasurer; Collector of Internal Revenue	Campbell Carmichael	Labor	17 April 1912	5 May 1912	18 days
Treasurer; Collector of Internal Revenue	John Cann	Labor	6 May 1912	29 June 1913	1 year, 54 days
Chief Secretary; Registrar of Records	Donald Macdonell (Note: Donald Macdonell was absent from the parliament from 1 March 1911 due to illness. He was automatically expelled for non-attendance during an entire session but was re-elected unopposed. He died on 26 October 1911, while in office.)	Labor	21 October 1910	26 October 1911	1 year, 5 days
Chief Secretary; Registrar of Records	Fred Flowers MLC	Labor	7 November 1911	26 November 1911	19 days
Chief Secretary; Registrar of Records	James McGowen	Labor	27 November 1911	29 June 1913	1 year, 214 days
Attorney General	William Holman	Labor	21 October 1910	29 June 1913	2 years, 251 days
Minister of Justice	William Holman	Labor	21 October 1910	1 April 1912	1 year, 163 days
Minister of Justice	David Hall MLC	Labor	2 April 1912	29 June 1913	1 year, 88 days
Solicitor General	David Hall MLC	Labor	4 April 1912	29 June 1913	1 year, 86 days
Minister for Agriculture	Donald Macdonell	Labor	21 October 1910	10 September 1911	324 days
Minister for Agriculture	John Treflé	Labor	7 November 1911	29 June 1913	1 year, 234 days
Secretary for Lands	Niels Nielsen (Note: On 25 July 1911, two Labor Members of the Legislative Assembly resigned from the Labor Party and Parliament in protest at legislation on land ownership introduced by Secretary for Lands, Niels Nielsen. As a result Labor was left without a majority in the house and rather than face a vote of no confidence, the Ministry and Speaker resigned. Labor policy was reversed and Nielsen resigned from the cabinet on 1 August 1911.)	Labor	21 October 1910	1 August 1911	284 days
Secretary for Lands	Fred Flowers MLC	Labor	4 August 1911	26 November 1911	117 days
Secretary for Lands	George Beeby (Note: George Beeby resigned from the ministry, parliament and party in protest at the power of the extra-parliamentary Labor Party executive in December 1912, necessitating a further reshuffle.)	Labor	19 September 1911	9 December 1912	1 year, 81 days
Secretary for Lands	John Treflé	Labor	10 December 1912	29 June 1913	201 days
Secretary for Public Works	Arthur Griffith	Labor	21 October 1910	29 June 1913	2 years, 251 days
Minister of Public Instruction	George Beeby	Labor	21 October 1910	10 September 1911	324 days
Minister of Public Instruction	Campbell Carmichael	Labor	11 September 1911	26 November 1911	76 days
Minister of Public Instruction	Fred Flowers MLC	Labor	27 November 1911	29 February 1912	94 days
Minister of Public Instruction	Campbell Carmichael	Labor	1 March 1912	29 June 1913	1 year, 120 days
Minister for Labour and Industry	George Beeby	Labor	21 October 1910	10 September 1911	324 days
Minister for Labour and Industry	Campbell Carmichael	Labor	11 September 1911	26 November 1911	76 days
Minister for Labour and Industry	George Beeby	Labor	27 November 1911	9 December 1912	1 year, 12 days
Minister for Labour and Industry	Campbell Carmichael	Labor	10 December 1912	29 June 1913	201 days
Secretary for Mines	Alfred Edden	Labor	21 October 1910	29 June 1913	2 years, 251 days
Vice-President of the Executive Council; Representative of the Government in Legislative Council	Fred Flowers MLC	Labor	21 October 1910	29 June 1913	2 years, 251 days
Minister without portfolio	Campbell Carmichael	Labor	21 October 1910	10 September 1911	2 years, 251 days
Minister without portfolio	John Treflé	Labor	21 October 1910	6 November 1911	1 year, 16 days
Minister without portfolio	John Dacey	Labor	10 November 1911	26 November 1911	16 days

Ministers were members of the Legislative Assembly unless otherwise noted.

== See also ==
  - Members of Legislative Assembly
  - (1910-1913)
  - Members of Legislative Council
  - (1910–1913)

== Notes ==
Preceded by Wade ministry	McGowen ministry 1910 – 1913	Succeeded by First Holman ministry
