= Holman ministry (1913–1916) =

First New South Wales government ministry led by William Holman

First Holman ministry
- 35th Cabinet of the State of New South Wales

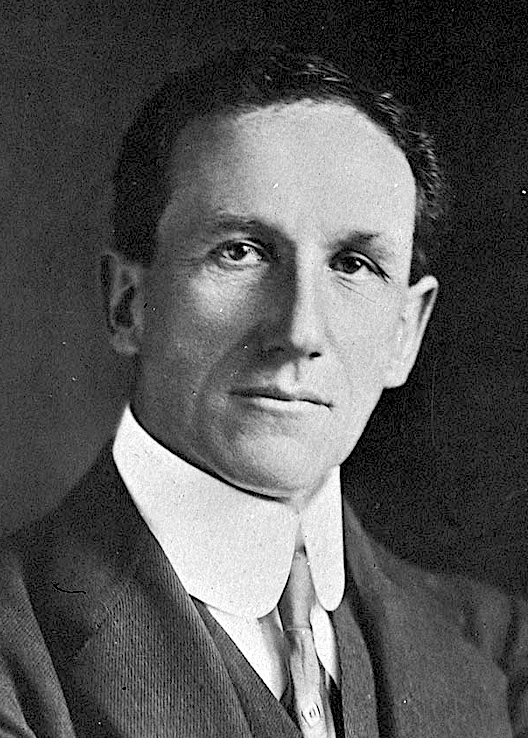
- Premier William Holman
- Date formed: 30 June 1913
- Date dissolved: 15 November 1916

People and organisations
- Monarch: George V
- Governor: Sir Gerald Strickland
- Premier: William Holman
- No. of ministers: 9
- Member party: Labor
- Status in legislature: Majority government
- Opposition party: Liberal Reform
- Opposition leader: Charles Wade

History
- Election: 1913 New South Wales election
- Outgoing election: 1917 New South Wales election
- Predecessor: McGowen ministry
- Successor: Holman Nationalist ministry

The Holman ministry (1913 – 1916), first Holman ministry or Holman Labor ministry was the 35th ministry of the New South Wales Government, and was led by the 19th Premier, William Holman.

Holman was elected to the New South Wales Legislative Assembly in 1898, serving until 1920, before being elected to the Australian House of Representatives. Holman, as Deputy Leader, had been acting premier from 15 March to 4 September 1911 while Premier James McGowen was overseas. Holman had been absent from the State from 27 December 1912 until 6 June 1913. When Holman returned, McGowen resigned due to his health and misjudgment in attempting to settle a gasworkers strike. Holman was elected leader of the Labor Party and was commissioned to form government by Sir Gerald Strickland, Governor of New South Wales.

At the Easter 1916 NSW Labor Conference, the Holman government was censured "for refusing to endeavour to carry out and give effect to the first plank of the Labour platform - abolition of the Upper House". Holman resigned the Labor leadership but not the premiership or his seat. John Storey was elected leader, however on the same day a motion of confidence in the Holman government was passed and Holman restored as leader.

The ministry covers the period from 30 June 1913 until 15 November 1916. In November 1916 Labor split over conscription, when Premier Holman, and twenty of his supporters, including ministers William Ashford, William Grahame, David Hall, Henry Hoyle and Arthur Griffith were expelled from the party for defying party policy and supporting conscription. Holman and his supporters joined a grand coalition with the members of the various conservative parties. By 1917, this had coalesced into the Nationalist Party of Australia.

== Composition of ministry ==
The composition of the ministry was announced by Premier Holman on 30 June 1913.

Portfolio	Minister	Party	Term start	Term end	Term length
Premier	William Holman (Note: Expelled from Labor Party on 7 November 1916.)	Labor	30 June 1913	15 November 1916	3 years, 138 days
Colonial Secretary	William Holman	Labor	30 June 1913	29 January 1914	213 days
Colonial Secretary	John Cann	Labor	29 January 1914	15 March 1915	1 year, 45 days
Colonial Secretary	George Black	Labor	15 March 1915	15 November 1916	1 year, 245 days
Treasurer	John Cann	Labor	30 June 1913	29 January 1914	213 days
Treasurer	William Holman	Labor	29 January 1914	15 November 1916	2 years, 291 days
Attorney General	William Holman	Labor	30 June 1913	29 January 1914	213 days
Attorney General	David Hall MLC / MLA (Note: David Hall resigned from the Legislative Council in November 2013 to be elected to the Legislative Assembly as the Member for Enmore.)	Labor	29 January 1914	15 November 1916	2 years, 306 days
Minister of Justice	David Hall MLC / MLA	Labor	30 June 1913	15 November 1916	3 years, 138 days
Solicitor General	David Hall MLC / MLA	Labor	30 June 1913	28 January 1914	212 days
Solicitor General	William Holman	Labor	19 January 1915	6 February 1915	18 days
Secretary for Lands	John Treflé (Note: John Treflé died on 11 January 1915.)	Labor	30 June 1913	11 January 1915	1 year, 195 days
Secretary for Lands	William Ashford	Labor	12 January 1915	15 November 1916	1 year, 308 days
Minister for Public Works	Arthur Griffith	Labor	30 June 1913	15 March 1915	1 year, 258 days
Minister for Public Works	John Cann	Labor	15 March 1915	15 November 1916	1 year, 245 days
Minister of Agriculture	John Treflé	Labor	30 June 1913	29 January 1914	213 days
Minister of Agriculture	William Ashford	Labor	29 January 1914	23 February 1915	1 year, 25 days
Minister of Agriculture	George Black	Labor	23 February 1915	15 March 1915	20 days
Minister of Agriculture	William Ashford	Labor	15 March 1915	1 June 1915	78 days
Minister of Agriculture	William Grahame	Labor	1 June 1915	15 November 1916	1 year, 167 days
Minister of Public Instruction	Campbell Carmichael (Note: Campbell Carmichael resigned in March 1915 over a dispute concerning seniority in the cabinet.)	Labor	30 June 1913	5 March 1915	1 year, 248 days
Minister of Public Instruction	Arthur Griffith	Labor	15 March 1915	7 November 1916	1 year, 237 days
Secretary for Mines	Alfred Edden (Note: Cabinet positions were selected by caucus on 28 January 1914. James McGowen declined to stand and Alfred Edden was defeated.)	Labor	30 June 1913	29 January 1914	213 days
Secretary for Mines	John Cann	Labor	29 January 1914	15 March 1915	1 year, 60 days
Secretary for Mines	John Estell	Labor	15 March 1915	31 October 1916	1 year, 230 days
Secretary for Mines	Henry Hoyle	Labor	31 October 1916	15 November 1916	15 days
Minister for Labour and Industry	James McGowen	Labor	30 June 1913	29 January 1914	213 days
Minister for Labour and Industry	John Estell	Labor	29 January 1914	31 October 1916	2 years, 276 days
Minister for Labour and Industry	Henry Hoyle	Labor	31 October 1916	15 November 1916	15 days
Minister for Public Health	Fred Flowers MLC	Labor	30 June 1913	27 April 1915	1 year, 301 days
Minister for Public Health	George Black	Labor	27 April 1915	15 November 1916	1 year, 202 days
Vice-President of the Executive Council; Representative of the Government in Legislative Council	Fred Flowers MLC	Labor	30 June 1913	27 April 1915	1 year, 301 days
Vice-President of the Executive Council; Representative of the Government in Legislative Council	John Fitzgerald MLC	Labor	27 April 1915	15 November 1916	1 year, 202 days
Minister without portfolio (Assistant Treasurer)	Henry Hoyle	Labor	29 January 1914	31 October 1916	2 years, 276 days
Minister without portfolio	William Grahame	Labor	15 March 1915	1 June 1915	78 days

Ministers were members of the Legislative Assembly unless otherwise noted.

== See also ==
- Holman Nationalist ministry
  - Members of Legislative Assembly
  - (1910-1913)
  - (1913–1917)
  - Members of Legislative Council
  - (1910–1913)
  - (1913–1917)

== Notes ==
Preceded by McGowen ministry	Holman ministry 1913 – 1916	Succeeded by Holman Nationalist ministry
