= Leslie Katz =

Former Solicitor-General and Federal Court Judge

The Honourable Justice Leslie Katz

Judge of the Federal Court of Australia
- In office 30 September 1998 – 21 March 2002

Personal details
- Occupation: Judge and lawyer

Leslie Katz SC is a former Solicitor General for New South Wales (1997–1998) who later became a judge of the Federal Court of Australia. Katz served on the Court from 30 September 1998 to 21 March 2002. Katz became seriously ill in December 2001, prompting his resignation the following year. Previously an academic at the University of Sydney, Katz in 1980 had become a member of the New South Wales Bar.

As Solicitor General, Katz appeared in a case arising out of the Hindmarsh Island bridge controversy, where it was argued removing heritage protection is unconstitutional.

Katz reports having been influenced to move from a career in academia to practice by former High Court Justice Michael Kirby. At the time, Kirby was the head of the Australian Law Reform Commission.
