= Patrick Scully =

Australian politician

Patrick Charles Scully (16 August 1887 – 6 February 1951) was an Australian politician.

He was born at Tamworth to Thomas James Scully and Sarah Lucy, née Rutherford. After attending Bective Superior Public School he passed the teachers' examination and taught at various country schools from 1909 to 1920. On 25 January 1911 he married Nellie Evans. A supporter of the New England New State Movement, he served as a Labor member of the New South Wales Legislative Assembly for Namoi from 1920 to 1923, when he resigned and was replaced by his brother William. Scully died in Melbourne in 1951.

New South Wales Legislative Assembly
Preceded by Walter Wearne	Member for Namoi; 1920–1923; Served alongside: Chaffey, Wearne	Succeeded by William Scully
