= Walter Wearne =

Australian politician (1867–1931)

The Honourable Walter Ernest Wearne
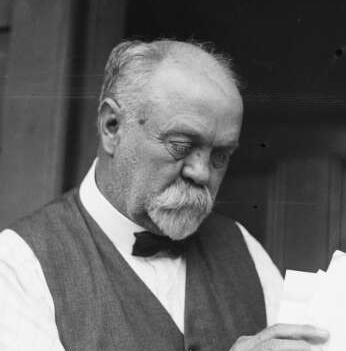
- Walter Wearne, photographed in December 1927.

Personal details
- Born: 2 September 1867 Sydney, Australia
- Died: 17 January 1931 (aged 63) Sydney, Australia
- Party: Independent Progressive Party, Nationalist

Walter Ernest Wearne (2 September 1867 – 17 January 1931) was an Australian politician and member of the New South Wales Legislative Assembly from 1917 until 1930. He was initially elected as an Independent but subsequently formed the Progressive Party of which he was the leader until it split into urban and rural wings in 1921. His urban wing subsequently amalgamated with the Nationalist Party of which he was the deputy leader in the NSW Parliament.

== Early life ==
Wearne was born in Sydney. He was subsequently educated to elementary level in Bingara and Inverell . His father, James Wearne, owned a sawmill where he was first employed. Wearne also worked as an auctioneer, commercial agent and council clerk for Bingara Shire between 1890 and 1910. By 1920 he had amassed considerable property in the Bingara region.

== Political activity ==
In the first two decades of the twentieth century, he became politically active supporting temperance organizations and the New England New State Movement of Earle Page. He became an office holder of the Farmers' and Settlers' Association of New South Wales.

== State Parliament ==
At the 1917 election he successfully contested the seat of Namoi as an Independent Nationalist. He defeated the sitting member George Black who had been expelled from the Labor Party for supporting the Nationalist government of William Holman.

== Progressive Party and Government ==
Holman's conservative 'win the war' coalition broke up prior to the 1920 election which was conducted, for the first time, using proportional representation and multi-member seats. Wearne was elected to the three member seat of Namoi and became the leader of the 15 members who had been elected as Progressives. The Progressive Party was characterized by friction between its rural and urban members and this friction came to a climax with the fall of the government of James Dooley on 20 December 1921. Urban progressives favoured a coalition with the Nationalist Party leader George Fuller but most of the rural members, who became known as 'the True Blues', would only promise Fuller their conditional support. This division resulted in Fuller's government lasting less than 8 hours and Dooley regaining the Premiership. Despite representing a rural electorate Wearne sided with T J Ley and the urban wing of the party. This wing subsequently amalgamated with the Nationalist party, of which Wearne became deputy leader, while the rural wing evolved into the Country Party. Wearne continued to represent Namoi as a Nationalist in the Legislative Assembly until multi-member seats were abolished at the 1927 election. He then represented Barwon until his retirement at the 1930 election. Wearne was Secretary for Lands and Minister for Forests in both Fuller Ministries.

New South Wales Legislative Assembly
Preceded by George Black	Member for Namoi; 1917–1927; With: none / Chaffey none / Patrick Scully / William Scully	Succeeded by district abolished
Preceded by new district	Member for Barwon; 1927–1930	Succeeded by Bill Ratcliffe
Political offices
Preceded by Peter Loughlin	Secretary for Lands; Minister for Forests; 20 December 1921	Succeeded by Peter Loughlin
Preceded by Peter Loughlin	Secretary for Lands; Minister for Forests; 1922 – 1925	Succeeded by Peter Loughlin
