= Edward Kavanagh (Australian politician) =

Australian politician (1871–1956)

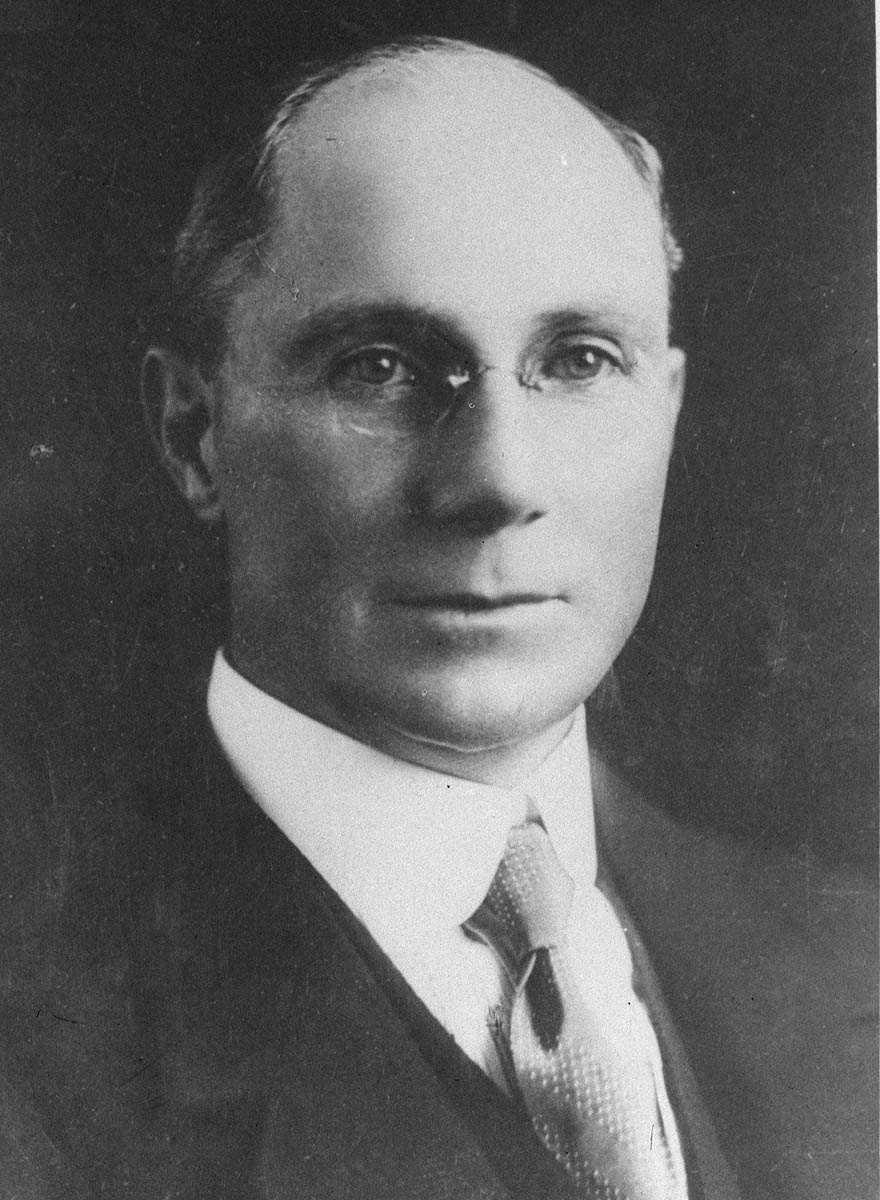
Edward Kavanagh

Edward John Kavanagh (30 October 1871 – 10 October 1956) was an Australian politician.

He was born in Sydney to publican William Kavanagh and Ellen Carty. He attended Marist Brothers' College before going to sea on a coastal trading vessel. He later worked as a tailor, and became involved in the Pressers' Union and through that with the Trades and Labor Council. On 31 December 1894 he married Agnes Jane Cousins, with whom he had six children. He was president of the Trades and Labor Council from 1905 to 1906.

In 1912, he was appointed to the New South Wales Legislative Council as a Labor member. He was active in the anti-conscription campaign in 1916 and was arrested during the 1917 general strike. From 1920 to 1922 he was Vice-President of the Executive Council and Representative of the Government in the Legislative Council. He was also Minister for Labour from December 1921 to April 1922. From 1926 to 1931 he was deputy industrial commissioner. The Legislative Council was reformed in 1934, which become indirectly elected. He stood as a candidate but was unsuccessful. He was an industrial advocate from 1931 to 1937. From 1937 to 1941 he was Apprenticeship and Conciliation Commissioner, and from 1941 to 1945 he was Director of labour in the Commonwealth Ministry of Munitions.

Kavanagh died at Strathfield on 10 October 1956 (aged 84).

Parliament of New South Wales
Political offices
Preceded by George Fuller	Vice-President of the Executive Council; 1920–1921	Succeeded by Sir Joseph Carruthers
Preceded by Sir Joseph Carruthers	Vice-President of the Executive Council; 1921–1922	Succeeded by Sir Joseph Carruthers
Preceded by Thomas Ley as Minister for Labour and Industry	Minister for Labour; 1921 – 1922	Succeeded by Ernest Farrar as Minister for Labour and Industry
New South Wales Legislative Council
Preceded by John Garland	Leader of the Government in the Legislative Council; 1920–1921	Succeeded by Sir Joseph Carruthers
Preceded by Sir Joseph Carruthers	Leader of the Government in the Legislative Council; 1921–1922	Succeeded by Sir Joseph Carruthers
