= Peter Loughlin =

Australian politician

Peter Ffrench Loughlin (12 December 1881 – 11 July 1960) was an Australian politician.

== Early life ==
He was born in Braidwood to police constable John Loughlin and Sarah Jane, née Ffrench. He was educated at Girrinderra and Goulburn, becoming a schoolteacher and teaching at various public schools from 1900 to 1917. He married Louisa Davis at Cowra on 16 April 1906, with whom he had seven children.

== Parliamentary career ==
A member of the Labor Party, he was elected to the New South Wales Legislative Assembly in 1917 as the member for Burrangong, moving to Cootamundra with the introduction of proportional representation in 1920. He was Secretary for Lands and Minister for Forests from 1920 to 1922 and from 1925 to 1926, and deputy leader of the Labor Party from 1923 to 1926 (and deputy premier from 1925 to 1926), when he resigned from the party. He ran as an independent candidate for Young at the 1930 election, during which time he was working as a proofreader for the Goulburn Evening Post, and at the 1932 election he ran for Goulburn as a United Australia Party candidate, winning election. He was defeated in 1935.

== Subsequent life and death ==
After his defeat Loughlin farmed in the Carcoar and Mandurama districts before retiring to Pennant Hills in the 1950s.

Loughlin died at Hornsby on 11 July 1960 (aged 78).

New South Wales Legislative Assembly
Preceded by George Burgess	Member for Burrangong; 1917–1920	Succeeded by Seat abolished
Preceded by William Holman	Member for Cootamundra; 1920–1927; With: Main; G. McGirr / J. McGirr / Hoad	Succeeded by Ken Hoad
Preceded by Jack Tully	Member for Goulburn; 1932–1935	Succeeded by Jack Tully
Political offices
Preceded by William Ashford	Secretary for Lands; Minister for Forests; 1920 – 1921	Succeeded by Walter Wearne
Preceded by Walter Wearne	Secretary for Lands; Minister for Forests; 1921 – 1922	Succeeded by Walter Wearne
Preceded by Walter Wearne	Secretary for Lands; Minister for Forests; 1925 – 1926	Succeeded by Jack Lang
