= 1920 New South Wales state election =

Election of the 25th New South Wales Legislative Assembly

- 20 March 1920

All 90 seats in the New South Wales Legislative Assembly 46 Assembly seats were needed for a majority
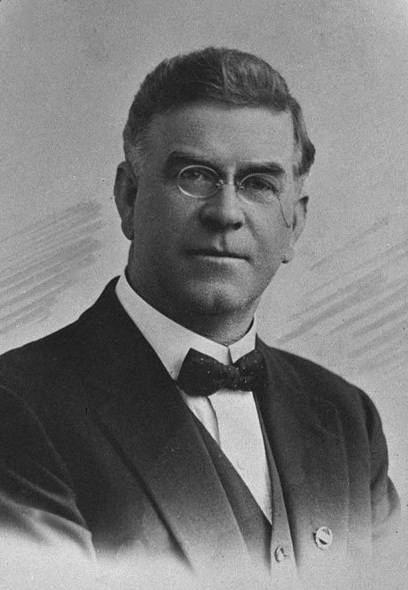

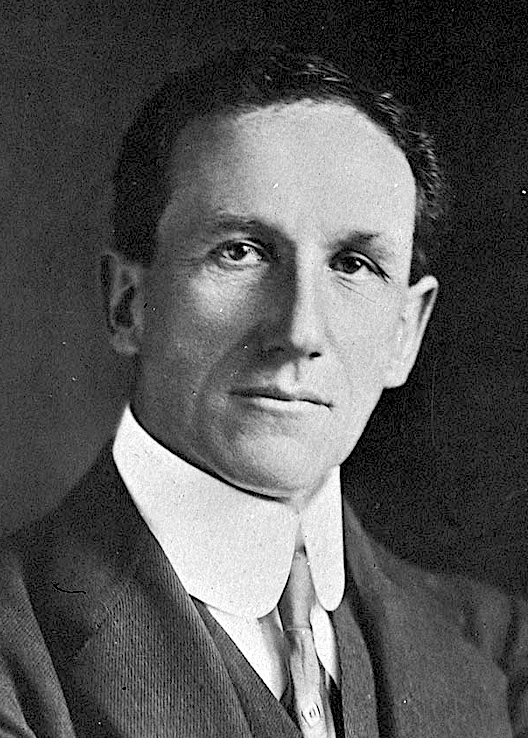

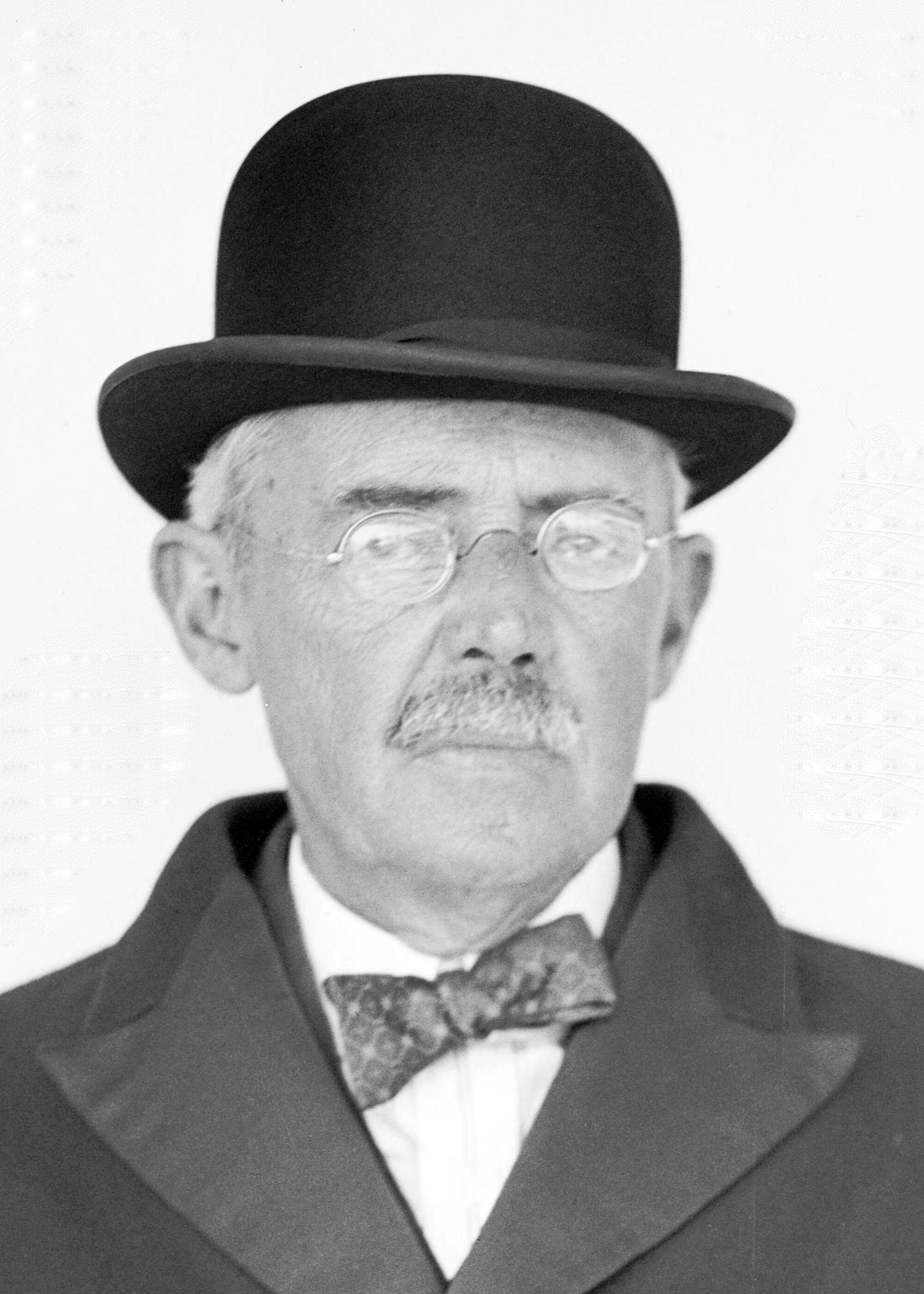

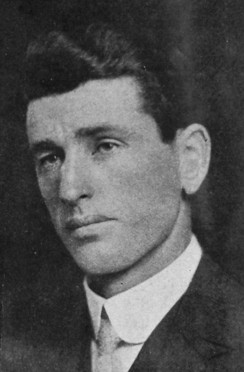
	First party	Second party
Leader	John Storey	William Holman
Party	Labor	Nationalist
Leader since	February 1917	15 November 1916
Leader's seat	Balmain	Cootamundra (lost seat)
Last election	33 seats	52 seats
Seats won	43	28
Seat change	▲10	▼24
Primary vote	252,371	175,280
Percentage	43.08%	29.92%
Swing	▲0.45	▼17.52
	Third party	Fourth party
Leader	George Beeby	Ernie Judd
Party	Progressive	Socialist Labor
Leader since	1920	1920
Leader's seat	Murray	None (contested Sydney)
Last election	Did not exist	0 seats
Seats won	15	1
Seat change	▲15	▲1
Primary vote	88,557	6,143
Percentage	15.12%	1.05%
Swing	▲15.12	▲0.99
- Results of the election
Premier before election
William Holman
Nationalist
Subsequent Premier
John Storey
Labor

The 1920 New South Wales state election was held on 20 March 1920. The 24th parliament of New South Wales was dissolved on 18 February 1920 by the Governor, Sir Walter Edward Davidson, on the advice of the Premier William Holman. The election was for all of the 90 seats in the 25th New South Wales Legislative Assembly, and it was the first to be conducted with multi-member electorates, using the Hare-Clark single transferable vote system.

It was conducted using 24 districts, 15 having 3 members and nine having five members.

== Key dates ==
Date	Event
18 February 1920	The Legislative Assembly was dissolved, and writs were issued by the Governor to proceed with an election.
28 February 1920	Nominations for candidates for the election closed at noon.
20 March 1920	Polling day.
12 April 1920	Storey ministry sworn in
21 April 1920	Writs returned.
27 April 1920	Opening of 25th Parliament.

== Results ==
The assembly was evenly divided, with Labor having 43 seats and the support of Percy Brookfield (Socialist Labor) and Arthur Gardiner (Independent Labor), while the Nationalists had 28 seats and the support of 15 seats of the Progressive Party and 2 independent Nationalists. The Speaker of the Legislative Assembly did not vote unless there was a tie which meant whichever side provided the speaker was unable to command a majority. Nationalist Daniel Levy controversially accepted re-election as speaker, giving Labor an effective majority.

Compared to previous election held using majority-runoff, two new parties had representation in the chamber - Progressive and Socialist Labor.

1920 New South Wales state election Legislative Assembly << 1917–1922 >>
Enrolled voters	1,154,437				
Votes cast	648,709		Turnout	56.19	−5.24
Informal votes	62,900		Informal	9.70	+8.68
Summary of votes by party
Party	Primary votes	%	Swing	Seats	Change
Labor	252,371	43.08	+0.45	43	+10
Nationalist	175,280	29.92	−17.52	28	−24
Progressive	88,557	15.12	+15.12	15	+15
Independent (Note: Includes Independent Labor.)	28,410	4.85	−2.55	1	–3
Democratic	14,026	2.39	+2.39	0	
Soldiers & Citizens	10,055	1.72	+1.72	0	
Ind. Nationalist	9,357	1.60	–0.87	2	+1
Socialist Labor	6,143	1.05	+0.99	1	+1
Women's	1,610	0.27	+0.27	0	
Total	585,809			90	

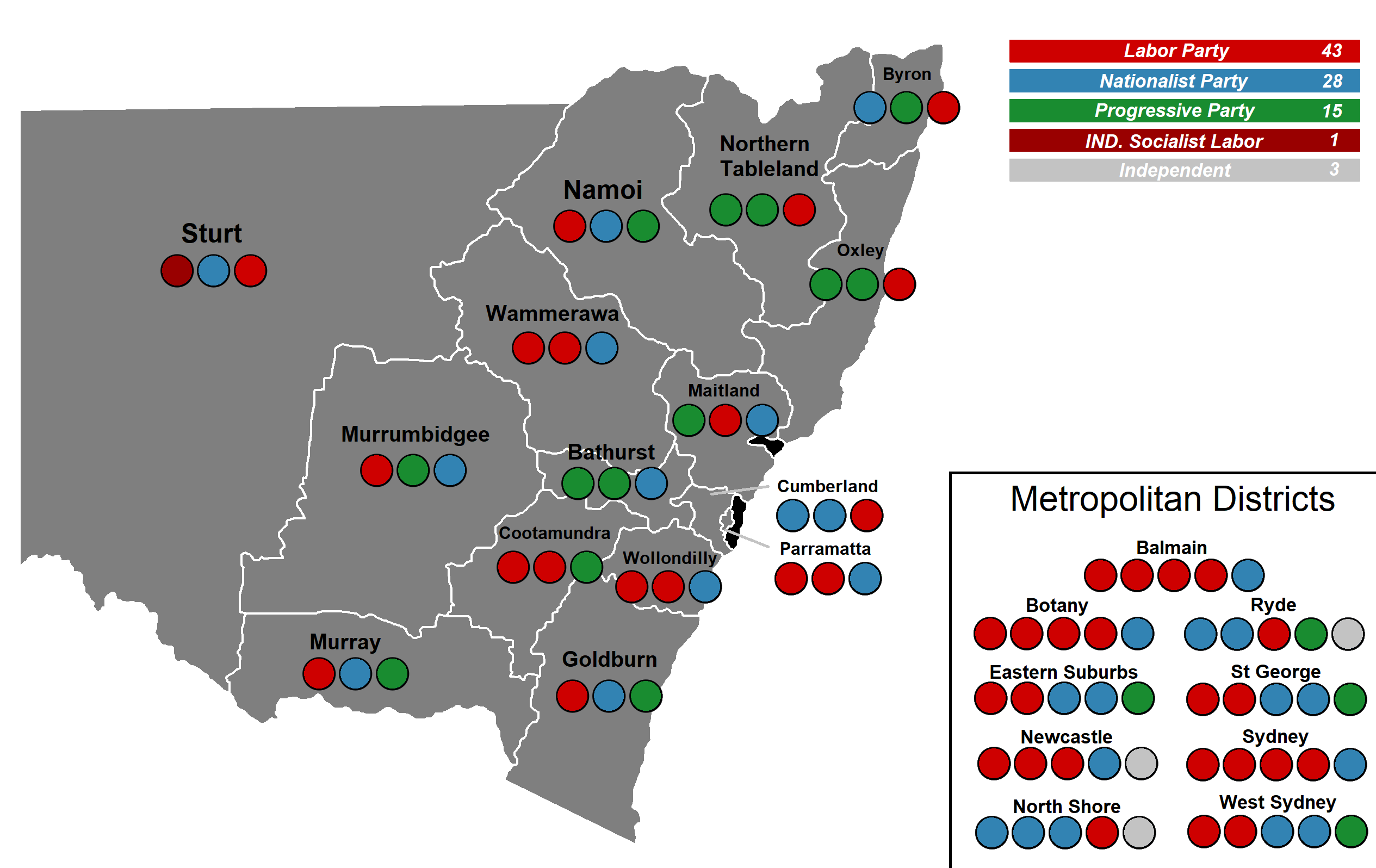
Results of 1920

Popular vote
Labor	43.08%
Nationalist	29.92%
Progressive	15.12%
Independent	4.83%
Ind. Nationalist	1.60%
Socialist Labor	1.06%
Others	4.39%
Parliamentary seats
Labor	43
Nationalist	28
Progressive	15
Ind. Nationalist	2
Independent	1
Socialist Labor	1

== Changing seats ==
1917 election				1920 election		
Old Electorate	Member	Party	Note	New Electorate	New Member	Party
Darling Harbour	John Cochran	Labor	Retired	Balmain		
Glebe	Tom Keegan	Labor	Defeated	Balmain		
Leichhardt	Campbell Carmichael	Labor / Soldiers & Citizens	Defeated	Balmain	Albert Smith	Nationalist
Lyndhurst	Claude Bushell	Labor	Retired	Bathurst		
Enmore	David Hall	Nationalist	Appointed an MLC	Botany	John Lee	Nationalist
Byron	John Perry	Nationalist	Retired	Byron	Tom Swiney	Labor
Clarence	William Zuill	Nationalist	Defeated	Byron	Stephen Perdriau	Progressive
Cootamundra	William Holman	Nationalist	Defeated	Cootamundra	Hugh Main	Progressive
Camden	John Hunt	Nationalist	Retired	Cumberland	Ernest Carr	Nationalist
Hawkesbury	Bruce Walker	Independent	Changed party	Cumberland	Bruce Walker	Nationalist
				Cumberland	Voltaire Molesworth	Labor
Bondi	James MacArthur-Onslow	Nationalist	Changed party	Eastern Suburbs	James MacArthur-Onslow	Progressive
Randwick	David Storey	Nationalist	Appointed an MLC	Eastern Suburbs	Harold Jaques	Nationalist
				Eastern Suburbs	James Fingleton	Labor
Woollahra	William Latimer	Nationalist	Appointed an MLC	Eastern Suburbs	Bob O'Halloran	Labor
Bega	William Millard	Nationalist	Defeated	Goulburn	Thomas Rutledge	Progressive
Durham	Walter Bennett	Independent	Changed party	Maitland	Walter Bennett	Progressive
Maitland	Charles Nicholson	Nationalist	Defeated	Maitland	Walter O'Hearn	Labor
Singleton	James Fallick	Nationalist	Retired	Maitland		
Albury	Arthur Manning	Nationalist	Defeated	Murray	Matthew Kilpatrick	Progressive
Wagga Wagga	George Beeby	Nationalist	Changed party	Murray	George Beeby	Progressive
Lachlan	Ernest Buttenshaw	Nationalist	Changed party	Murrumbidgee	Ernest Buttenshaw	Progressive
Macquarie	Patrick McGirr	Labor	Defeated	Murrumbidgee	Martin Flannery	Labor
Murrumbidgee	Patrick McGarry	Nationalist	Defeated	Murrumbidgee		
Gwydir	John Crane	Nationalist	Defeated	Namoi	Patrick Scully	Labor
Namoi	Walter Wearne	Ind. Nationalist	Changed party	Namoi	Walter Wearne	Progressive
Kahibah	Alfred Edden	Nationalist	Retired	Newcastle	Hugh Connell	Labor
Wickham	William Grahame	Nationalist	Defeated (Note: Stood as an Ind. Nationalist)	Newcastle	John Fegan	Nationalist
Mosman	Percy Colquhoun	Nationalist	Defeated	North Shore	Alfred Reid	Ind. Nationalist
				North Shore	Cecil Murphy	Labor
Armidale	Herbert Lane	Nationalist	Defeated	Northern Tableland	David Drummond	Progressive
Bingara	George McDonald	Nationalist	Appointed an MLC	Northern Tableland	Alfred McClelland	Labor
Gough	Follett Thomas	Nationalist	Defeated (Note: Stood as a Progressive candidate)	Northern Tableland		
Tenterfield	Charles Lee	Nationalist	Retired	Northern Tableland	Michael Bruxner	Progressive
Gloucester	Richard Price	Independent	Changed party	Oxley	Richard Price	Progressive
Hastings and Macleay	Henry Morton	Nationalist	Defeated	Oxley	Joseph Fitzgerald	Labor
Raleigh	George Briner	Nationalist	Changed party	Oxley	George Briner	Progressive
				Parramatta	Bill Ely	Labor
Drummoyne	Alexander Graff	Nationalist / Independent	Retired	Ryde	Edward Loxton	Ind. Nationalist
Gordon	Thomas Bavin	Nationalist	Changed party	Ryde	Thomas Bavin	Progressive
Ryde	William Thompson	Nationalist	Retired	Ryde	David Anderson	Nationalist
				Ryde	Robert Greig	Labor
				St George	Mark Gosling	Labor
Sturt	Percy Brookfield	Labor / Independent		Sturt	Percy Brookfield	Socialist Labor
Willyama	Jabez Wright	Labor	Defeated	Sturt		
King	Tom Smith	Labor	Defeated	Sydney	Patrick Minahan	Labor (Note: Patrick Minahan was nominated by the Labor Party, however his endorsement was withdrawn before the polling day because he signed a pledge for the unconditional release of twelve imprisoned members of the Industrial Workers of the World.)
Ashfield	William Robson	Nationalist	Appointed an MLC	Western Suburbs	Edward McTiernan	Labor
				Western Suburbs	James Wilson	Progressive
Allowrie	Mark Morton	Nationalist	Defeated	Wollondilly	John Cleary	Labor

== See also ==
- Candidates of the 1920 New South Wales state election
- Members of the New South Wales Legislative Assembly, 1920–1922
