= Minister for Forests (New South Wales) =

Former government minister in the state of New South Wales

Minister for Forests of New South Wales

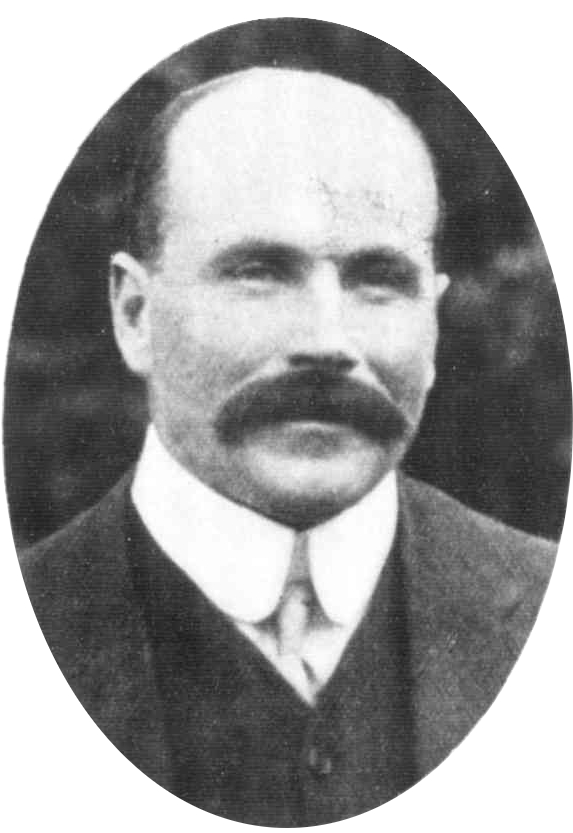
- First minister William Ashford
- Appointer: Governor of New South Wales
- Formation: 15 November 1916
- First holder: William Ashford
- Final holder: Paul Toole as Minister for Lands and Forestry
- Abolished: 23 March 2019

The Minister for Forests was a ministry in New South Wales responsible for the management of forests for the purpose of the timber industry and was established in 1916 and abolished in 2019. While it was a separate portfolio for much of this period, it was generally held in conjunction with another portfolio, typically Lands or Agriculture.

== History ==
Forests had been the responsibility of the Lands Department since 1897. In 1907 a Royal Commission was appointed to investigate the management and sustainability of forests for the purposes of the timber industry, comprising Alexander Kethel MLC, William Fehon/J A Curtis, (Note: William Fehon resigned in January 1908, and was replaced by J A Curtis.) and William Freeman. The Royal Commission found that at the rate of consumption, commercial hardwood would be exhausted in 36 years and softwood within 20 years. Their recommendations included that the administration and control of forests should be given to 3 independent commissioners instead of the Department of Lands. This recommendation was only partially implemented, with the Forestry Act 1909, creating a Forestry Department that reported to the Minister for Agriculture. The department was abolished in 1916 and replaced with the Forestry Commission which reported directly to the newly created Minister for Forests, who concurrently held the portfolio of Minister for Lands.

In 2011 the portfolio was absorbed into Lands and Water. Since 2013 forests in NSW are managed by the Forestry Corporation of NSW, a state owned corporation.

== List of ministers for forests ==
Title	Minister	Party	Term start	Term end	Time in office	Notes
Secretary for Lands; Minister for Forests	William Ashford	Nationalist	15 November 1916	12 April 1920	3 years, 149 days	
Secretary for Lands; Minister for Forests	Peter Loughlin	Labor	12 April 1920	20 December 1921	1 year, 252 days	
Secretary for Lands; Minister for Forests	Walter Wearne	Nationalist	20 December 1921	20 December 1921	7 hours	
Secretary for Lands; Minister for Forests	Peter Loughlin	Labor	20 December 1921	13 April 1922	114 days	
Secretary for Lands; Minister for Forests	Walter Wearne	Nationalist	13 April 1922	17 June 1925	3 years, 65 days	
Secretary for Lands; Minister for Forests	Peter Loughlin	Labor	17 June 1925	19 November 1926	1 year, 155 days	
Secretary for Lands; Minister for Forests	Jack Lang	Labor	25 November 1926	26 May 1927	182 days	
Secretary for Lands; Minister for Forests	Ted Horsington	Labor	26 May 1927	18 October 1927	145 days	
Minister for Forests	Frank Chaffey	Nationalist	18 October 1927	15 April 1929	1 year, 179 days	
Minister for Forests	Reginald Weaver	Nationalist	15 April 1929	3 November 1930	1 year, 202 days	
Minister for Agriculture and Forests	Bill Dunn	Labor	4 November 1930	15 October 1931	1 year, 191 days	
Minister for Agriculture and Forests	Bill Dunn	Labor (NSW)	15 October 1931	13 May 1932	1 year, 191 days	
Minister for Agriculture; Minister for Forests	Hugh Main	Country	16 May 1932	17 June 1932	32 days	
Minister for Forests	Roy Vincent	Country	18 June 1932	16 May 1941	8 years, 332 days	
Minister for Agriculture and Forests	Bill Dunn	Labor	16 May 1941	8 June 1944	3 years, 23 days	
Minister for Lands; Minister for Forests	Milton Morris	Liberal	3 January 1975	30 June 1975	178 days	
Minister for Lands; Minister for Forests	John Mason	Liberal	30 June 1975	23 January 1976	207 days	
Minister for Lands; Minister for Forests	Col Fisher	Country	23 January 1976	14 May 1976	112 days	
Minister for Lands; Minister for Forests; Minister for Water Resources	Lin Gordon	Labor	29 February 1980	2 October 1981	1 year, 216 days	
Minister for Water Resources; Minister for Forests	Paul Whelan	Labor	1 February 1983	5 April 1984	1 year, 64 days	
Minister for Forests	Jack Hallam	Labor	5 November 1986	21 March 1988	1 year, 137 days	
Minister for Lands and Forests	Garry West	National	24 July 1990	6 June 1991	317 days	
Minister for Forestry	Kim Yeadon	Labor	1 December 1997	2 April 2003	5 years, 122 days	
Minister Assisting the Minister for Natural Resources (Forests)	Michael Costa	Labor	2 April 2003	1 July 2004	1 year, 90 days	
Minister for Mineral and Forest Resources	Ian Macdonald	Labor	4 December 2009	4 June 2010	182 days	
Minister for Mineral and Forest Resources	Paul McLeay	Labor	4 June 2010	1 September 2010	89 days	
Minister for Mineral and Forest Resources	Steve Whan	Labor	6 September 2010	28 March 2011	203 days	
Minister for Lands and Forestry	Paul Toole	National	30 January 2017	23 March 2019	2 years, 52 days	
