= Members of the New South Wales Legislative Assembly, 1898–1901 =

Members of the New South Wales Legislative Assembly who served in the 18th parliament of New South Wales held their seats between 1898 and 1901. They were elected at the 1898 colonial election on 27 July 1898. The Speaker was Sir Joseph Abbott until 12 June 1900 and then William McCourt.

| Name | Party (Note: Members of the Protectionist Party under the leadership of Barton and Lyne campaigned as the National Federal Party at the 1898 colonial election. After the success of the 2nd Federal Referendum on 20 June 1899, they resumed the Protectionist name. The party designation is the designation given at the time of election but party affiliations were particularly flexible during the pre-federation period in the New South Wales Parliament (see Antony Green below).) | Electorate | Term in office |
|---|---|---|---|
| Sir Joseph Abbott | National Federal | Wentworth | 1880–1901 |
| William Affleck | Free Trade | Yass | 1894–1904 |
| George Anderson | Free Trade | Waterloo | 1894–1904 |
| William Archer | Ind. Free Trade | Burwood | 1898–1904 |
| James Ashton | Free Trade | Goulburn | 1894–1907 |
| John Barnes | National Federal | Gundagai | 1889–1904 |
| Edmund Barton ^{1, 5} | National Federal | Hastings and Macleay | 1879–1887, 1891–1894, 1898–1900 |
| Walter Bennett | Independent Federalist | Durham | 1898–1907, 1917–1934 |
| Thomas Brown | Labour | Condoublin | 1894–1901, 1913–1917 |
| James Brunker | Free Trade | East Maitland | 1880–1904 |
| Frank Byrne | Free Trade | Hay | 1898–1904 |
| Alexander Campbell | National Federal | Kiama | 1894–1904 |
| Archibald Campbell | Free Trade | Illawarra | 1891–1903 |
| John Cann | Labour | Broken Hill | 1891–1916 |
| James Carroll | National Federal | Lachlan | 1894–1904 |
| Joseph Carruthers | Free Trade | St George | 1887–1908 |
| John Chanter | National Federal | Deniliquin | 1885–1901 |
| Austin Chapman | National Federal | Braidwood | 1891–1901 |
| Henry Chapman | Free Trade (Note: While nominally supporters of the Free Trade Party, these members supported a no confidence motion which brought about the defeat of the Reid government.) | Sydney-Fitzroy | 1894–1895, 1898–1901 |
| Edward Clark | Free Trade | St Leonards | 1891–1904, 1907–1910 |
| Francis Clarke ^{1, 5} | National Federal | Hastings and Macleay | 1893–11898, 1900–1901 |
| Henry Clarke | National Federal | Bega | 1869–1894, 1895–1904 |
| Thomas Clarke | Free Trade | Darlington | 1898–1901 |
| John Cohen | National Federal | Petersham | 1898–1919 |
| Joseph Cook | Free Trade | Hartley | 1891–1901 |
| Henry Copeland ^{6} | National Federal | Sydney-Phillip | 1877–1883, 1883–1895, 1895–1900 |
| Francis Cotton | Free Trade | Newtown-Camperdown | 1891–1901 |
| Paddy Crick | National Federal | West Macquarie | 1889–1906 |
| George Cruickshank | National Federal | Inverell | 1889–1901 |
| John Dacey | Labour | Botany | 1895–1912 |
| David Davis | Independent Federalist | Shoalhaven | 1898–1901 |
| William Davis ^{11} | National Federal | Bourke | 1889–1891, 1898–1904 |
| William Dick | Free Trade | Newcastle East | 1894–1907 |
| Charles Dight | National Federal | Singleton | 1898–1904 |
| Robert Donaldson | Independent | Tumut | 1898–1913 |
| Alfred Edden | Labour | Kahibah | 1891–1920 |
| Thomas Ewing | National Federal | Lismore | 1885–1901 |
| John Fegan | Free Trade / Protectionist | Wickham | 1891–1907, 1920–1922 |
| William Ferguson | Labour | Sturt | 1894–1904 |
| William Ferris ^{2} | Independent Federalist | Parramatta | 1898–1901 |
| Robert Fitzgerald | National Federal | Robertson | 1885–1901 |
| John Fitzpatrick | Free Trade | Rylstone | 1895–1904, 1907–1930 |
| Thomas Fitzpatrick | National Federal | Murrumbidgee | 1894–1904 |
| John Garland | Free Trade | Woollahra | 1898–1901, 1903–1904 |
| John Gillies | Free Trade | West Maitland | 1891–1911 |
| Thomas Goodwin | National Federal | Gunnedah | 1887–1888, 1895–1901 |
| James Gormly | National Federal | Wagga Wagga | 1885–1904 |
| James Graham | Free Trade | Sydney-Belmore | 1894–1901, 1907–1910 |
| Arthur Griffith | Labour | Waratah | 1894–1903, 1904–1920 |
| Thomas Griffith | National Federal | Albury | 1898–1904 |
| Sir Matthew Harris | Free Trade | Sydney-Denison | 1894–1901 |
| Thomas Hassall | National Federal | Moree | 1886–1901 |
| John Hawthorne | Free Trade | Leichhardt | 1885–1891, 1894–1904 |
| James Hayes | National Federal | Murray | 1885–1904 |
| John Haynes | Free Trade | Wellington | 1887–1904, 1915–1917 |
| James Hogue | Free Trade | Glebe | 1894–1910 |
| William Holman | Labour | Grenfell | 1898–1920 |
| George Howarth | Free Trade | Willoughby | 1895–1903 |
| Billy Hughes | Labour | Sydney-Lang | 1894–1901 |
| William Hurley | National Federal | Macquarie | 1895–1904 |
| Thomas Jessep | Free Trade | Waverley | 1896–1907 |
| John Kidd | National Federal | Camden | 1880–1882, 1885–1887, 1889–1904 |
| Sydney Law | Labour | Balmain South | 1894–1907 |
| Charles Lee | Free Trade | Tenterfield | 1884–1920 |
| Samuel Lees | Free Trade | Nepean | 1887–1895, 1898–1901 |
| Robert Levien | Independent | Quirindi | 1880–1889, 1889–1913 |
| Sir William Lyne | National Federal | Hume | 1880–1901 |
| Hugh Macdonald | Labour | Castlereagh | 1894–1906 |
| Kenneth Mackay ^{4} | National Federal | Boorowa | 1895–1899 |
| Michael MacMahon ^{12} | Protectionist | Uralla-Walcha | 1900–1904 |
| William Mahony | Free Trade | Annandale | 1894–1910 |
| William McCourt | Free Trade | Bowral | 1882–1885, 1887–1913 |
| John McFarlane | National Federal | Clarence | 1887–1915 |
| James McGowen | Labour | Redfern | 1891–1917 |
| John McLaughlin | Independent | Raleigh | 1880–1885, 1895–1901 |
| Gordon McLaurin ^{14} | Protectionist | Hume | 1901–1913 |
| Francis McLean | Free Trade | Marrickville | 1894–1901 |
| Richard Meagher | Independent | Tweed | 1895, 1898–1904, 1907–1917 |
| William Millard | Free Trade | Moruya | 1894–1920, 1920–1921 |
| Gus Miller | National Federal | Monaro | 1889–1918 |
| Edmund Molesworth | Free Trade | Newtown-Erskine | 1889–1901 |
| Samuel Moore | Free Trade | Bingara | 1885–1910 |
| William Morgan | Free Trade | Hawkesbury | 1894–1901 |
| John Neild | Free Trade | Paddington | 1885–1889, 1891–1894, 1895–1901 |
| Arthur Nelson | National Federal | Sydney-Flinders | 1895–1904 |
| Harry Newman | Free Trade | Orange | 1891–1904 |
| John Nicholson | Free Trade | Woronora | 1891–1917 |
| Niels Nielsen ^{4} | Labour | Boorowa | 1899–1913 |
| John Nobbs | Free Trade | Granville | 1888–1893, 1898–1913 |
| John Norton ^{3} | Independent | Northumberland | 1898–1906, 1907–1910 |
| Daniel O'Connor ^{6} | Protectionist | Sydney-Phillip | 1877–1891, 1900–1904 |
| Broughton O'Conor | National Federal | Sherbrooke | 1898–1907 |
| Edward O'Sullivan | National Federal | Queanbeyan | 1885–1910 |
| Varney Parkes ^{7} | Free Trade | Canterbury | 1885–1888, 1891–1900, 1907–1913 |
| John Perry | National Federal | Ballina | 1889–1920 |
| Simeon Phillips | Free Trade | Dubbo | 1895–1904 |
| William Piddington ^{8, 12} | National Federal | Uralla-Walcha | 1894–1900 |
| Richard Price | National Federal | Gloucester | 1894–1904, 1907–1922 |
| Robert Pyers | National Federal | Richmond | 1894–1904 |
| Patrick Quinn | National Federal | Sydney-Bligh | 1898–1904 |
| George Reid | Free Trade | Sydney-King | 1880–1884, 1885–1901 |
| Joseph Reymond | National Federal | Ashburnham | 1895–1904 |
| Edwin Richards | National Federal | Mudgee | 1894–1904 |
| William Rigg | Free Trade | Newtown-St Peters | 1894–1901 |
| Thomas Rose | National Federal | Argyle | 1891–1904 |
| Andrew Ross | National Federal | Molong | 1880–1904 |
| Hugh Ross | Labour | Narrabri | 1898–1901 |
| William Sawers | National Federal | Tamworth | 1885–1886, 1898–1901 |
| John See | National Federal | Grafton | 1880–1904 |
| Richard Sleath | Labour | Wilcannia | 1894–1904 |
| Samuel Smith | Labour | Sydney-Pyrmont | 1898–1902 |
| Sydney Smith ^{7, 10} | Free Trade | Canterbury | 1882–1898, 1900 |
| William Spence | Labour | Cobar | 1898–1901 |
| Wilfred Spruson | National Federal | Sydney-Gipps | 1898–1901 |
| Richard Stevenson ^{3} | National Federal | Northumberland | 1886–1895, 1898–1899 |
| David Storey | Free Trade | Randwick | 1894–1920 |
| Francis Suttor ^{9} | National Federal | Bathurst | 1875–1887, 1891–1894, 1898–1900 |
| Thomas Taylor ^{10} | Independent | Canterbury | 1900–1901 |
| Edward Terry | Independent Federalist | Ryde | 1898–1901, 1904 |
| Josiah Thomas | Labour | Alma | 1894–1901 |
| Dugald Thomson | National Federal | Warringah | 1894–1901 |
| James Thomson | Labour | Newcastle West | 1895–1901 |
| Thomas Waddell | National Federal | Cowra | 1897–1917 |
| David Watkins | Labour | Wallsend | 1894–1901 |
| Chris Watson | Labour | Young | 1894–1901 |
| Samuel Whiddon | Free Trade | Sydney-Cook | 1894–1904 |
| Bill Wilks | Free Trade | Balmain North | 1894–1901 |
| William Willis | National Federal | Barwon | 1889–1904 |
| Charles Wilson | National Federal | Armidale | 1898–1901 |
| Bernhard Wise ^{13} | National Federal | Ashfield | 1887–1889, 1891–1895, 1898–1900 |
| Frederick Winchcombe ^{13} | Free Trade | Ashfield | 1900–1905 |
| William Wood | National Federal | Eden-Bombala | 1894–1913 |
| Francis Wright | National Federal | Glen Innes | 1882–1885, 1889–1903 |
| James Young | Free Trade | Manning | 1880–1901, 1904–1907 |
| William Young ^{9} | Protectionist | Bathurst | 1900–1907 |

By-elections

Under the constitution, ministers were required to resign to recontest their seats in a by-election when appointed. These by-elections are only noted when the minister was defeated; in general, he was elected unopposed.

| # | Electorate | Departing Member | Party | Reason for By-election | Date of By-election | Winner of By-election | Party |
|---|---|---|---|---|---|---|---|
| 1 | Hastings and Macleay | Francis Clarke | National Federal | Resigned to give Barton a seat | 23 September 1898 | Edmund Barton | National Federal |
| 2 | Parramatta | William Ferris | Independent Federalist | Election declared void on appeal | 26 October 1898 | William Ferris | Protectionist |
| 3 | Northumberland | Richard Stevenson | National Federal | Death | 20 June 1899 | John Norton | Independent |
| 4 | Boorowa | Kenneth Mackay | Protectionist | Appointed to Legislative Council | 23 September 1899 | Niels Nielsen | Labour |
| 5 | Hastings and Macleay | Edmund Barton | Protectionist | Resigned to take Constitution to London | 1 March 1900 | Francis Clarke | Protectionist |
| 6 | Sydney-Phillip | Henry Copeland | Protectionist | accepted post as Agent-General in London | 7 April 1900 | Daniel O'Connor | Protectionist |
| 7 | Canterbury | Varney Parkes | Free Trade | Resignation | 9 June 1900 | Sydney Smith | Free Trade |
| 8 | Uralla-Walcha | William Piddington | Protectionist | Resignation due to insolvency | 9 June 1900 | William Piddington | Protectionist |
| 9 | Bathurst | Francis Suttor | Protectionist | Appointed to Legislative Council | 25 June 1900 | William Young | Protectionist |
| 10 | Canterbury | Sydney Smith | Free Trade | By-election result voided on appeal | 28 July 1900 | Thomas Taylor | Independent |
| 11 | Bourke | William Davis | Protectionist | Resignation due to insolvency | 15 September 1900 | William Davis | Protectionist |
| 12 | Uralla-Walcha | William Piddington | Protectionist | Death | 27 October 1900 | Michael MacMahon | Protectionist |
| 13 | Ashfield | Bernhard Wise | Protectionist | Appointed to Legislative Council | 10 November 1900 | Frederick Winchcombe | Free Trade |
| 14 | Hume | William Lyne | Protectionist | Successfully contested Hume at 1901 Federal election | 17 April 1901 | Gordon McLaurin | Protectionist |

== See also ==
- Reid ministry
- Lyne ministry
- Results of the 1898 New South Wales colonial election
- Candidates of the 1898 New South Wales colonial election
