= Electoral results for the district of Richmond (New South Wales) =

Election results for Richmond, New South Wales, Australia

The Richmond, an electoral district of the Legislative Assembly in the Australian state of New South Wales, was created in 1880 and abolished in 1913.

| Election | Member | Party | | | | |
|---|---|---|---|---|---|---|
| 1880 | Charles Fawcett | None | | | | |
| 1882 | Samuel Gray | None | Member | Party | | |
| 1885 | Thomas Ewing | None | Patrick Hogan | None | | |
| 1887 | Thomas Ewing | Protectionist | Frederick Crouch | Protectionist | Member | Party |
| 1889 | Thomas Ewing | Protectionist | Bruce Nicoll | Protectionist | John Perry | Protectionist |
| 1891 | Thomas Ewing | Protectionist | Bruce Nicoll | Protectionist | John Perry | Protectionist |
| 1894 | Robert Pyers | Ind. Protectionist | | | | |
| 1895 | Robert Pyers | Protectionist | | | | |
| 1898 | Robert Pyers | Protectionist | | | | |
| 1901 | Robert Pyers | Progressive | | | | |
| 1904 | John Perry | Progressive | | | | |
| 1907 | John Perry | Liberal Reform | | | | |
| 1910 | John Perry | Liberal Reform | | | | |

== Election results ==
=== Elections in the 1910s ===
==== 1910 ====
1910 New South Wales state election: The Richmond
| Party | Candidate | Votes | % | ±% |
|---|---|---|---|---|
| Liberal Reform | John Perry | 3,687 | 60.9 | |
| Labour | William Gillies | 2,366 | 39.1 | |
| Total formal votes | | 6,053 | 97.2 | |
| Informal votes | | 172 | 2.8 | |
| Turnout | | 6,225 | 72.0 | |
| Liberal Reform hold | | | | |

=== Elections in the 1900s ===
==== 1907 ====
1907 New South Wales state election: The Richmond
| Party | Candidate | Votes | % | ±% |
|---|---|---|---|---|
| Liberal Reform | John Perry (b 1845) | 3,007 | 60.3 | +22.3 |
| Independent | Thomas Temperley | 1,984 | 39.8 | |
| Total formal votes | | 4,991 | 96.8 | |
| Informal votes | | 163 | 3.2 | |
| Turnout | | 5,154 | 69.3 | |
| Member changed to Liberal Reform from Progressive | | Swing | +22.3 | |

==== 1904 ====
1904 New South Wales state election: The Richmond
| Party | Candidate | Votes | % | ±% |
|---|---|---|---|---|
| Progressive | John Perry (b 1845) | 1,330 | 38.0 | |
| Liberal Reform | Thomas Temperley | 1,290 | 36.9 | |
| Independent | Robert Campbell | 763 | 21.8 | |
| Independent Liberal | Philip Morton | 117 | 3.3 | |
| Total formal votes | | 3,500 | 99.0 | |
| Informal votes | | 37 | 1.1 | |
| Turnout | | 3,537 | 55.8 | |
| Progressive hold | | | | |

The Richmond lost much of the district to Tenterfield and was expanded to include all of the abolished seat of Ballina and parts of the abolished seats of Lismore and The Tweed. The member for The Richmond was Robert Pyers (Progressive) who unsuccessfully contested Tenterfield. The member for Ballina was John Perry (b 1845). The member for Lismore was John Coleman (Liberal Reform) who successfully contested Rous, defeating the member for The Tweed, Richard Meagher (Independent), who stood as a Progressive candidate.

==== 1901 ====
1901 New South Wales state election: The Richmond
| Party | Candidate | Votes | % | ±% |
|---|---|---|---|---|
| Progressive | Robert Pyers | 854 | 73.2 | −6.0 |
| Liberal Reform | Thomas McFadden | 222 | 19.0 | |
| Independent Liberal | John Harper | 91 | 7.8 | |
| Total formal votes | | 1,167 | 99.2 | +0.3 |
| Informal votes | | 10 | 0.9 | −0.3 |
| Turnout | | 1,177 | 53.0 | +3.7 |
| Progressive hold | | | | |

=== Elections in the 1890s ===
==== 1898 ====
1898 New South Wales colonial election: The Richmond
| Party | Candidate | Votes | % | ±% |
|---|---|---|---|---|
| National Federal | Robert Pyers | 665 | 79.2 | |
| Ind. Free Trade | John Willard | 175 | 20.8 | |
| Total formal votes | | 840 | 98.8 | |
| Informal votes | | 10 | 1.2 | |
| Turnout | | 850 | 49.3 | |
| National Federal hold | | | | |

==== 1895 ====
1895 New South Wales colonial election: The Richmond
| Party | Candidate | Votes | % | ±% |
|---|---|---|---|---|
| Protectionist | Robert Pyers | 517 | 53.2 | |
| Ind. Protectionist | Robert Page | 392 | 40.4 | |
| Ind. Protectionist | Donald Cameron | 38 | 3.9 | |
| Ind. Protectionist | George Martin | 24 | 2.5 | |
| Total formal votes | | 971 | 98.3 | |
| Informal votes | | 17 | 1.7 | |
| Turnout | | 988 | 59.5 | |
| Protectionist hold | | | | |

==== 1894 ====
1894 New South Wales colonial election: The Richmond
| Party | Candidate | Votes | % | ±% |
|---|---|---|---|---|
| Ind. Protectionist | Robert Pyers | 612 | 46.2 | |
| Ind. Protectionist | Robert Page | 309 | 23.3 | |
| Ind. Protectionist | Allan Cameron | 300 | 22.7 | |
| Ind. Protectionist | James Stock | 79 | 6.0 | |
| Ind. Protectionist | Samuel Northcote | 24 | 1.8 | |
| Total formal votes | | 1,324 | 98.7 | |
| Informal votes | | 17 | 1.3 | |
| Turnout | | 1,341 | 80.5 | |
| Ind. Protectionist win | | (previously 3 members) | | |

==== 1891 ====
1891 New South Wales colonial election: The Richmond Wednesday 24 June
| Party | Candidate | Votes | % | ±% |
|---|---|---|---|---|
| Ind. Protectionist | Thomas Ewing (re-elected 1) | 2,464 | 23.3 | |
| Ind. Protectionist | Bruce Nicoll (re-elected 2) | 2,109 | 20.0 | |
| Ind. Protectionist | John Perry (re-elected 3) | 1,965 | 18.6 | |
| Protectionist | James Stock | 1,621 | 15.4 | |
| Protectionist | Samuel Northcote | 930 | 8.8 | |
| Protectionist | Richard Luscombe | 836 | 7.9 | |
| Protectionist | George Martin | 632 | 6.0 | |
| Total formal votes | | 10,557 | 98.8 | |
| Informal votes | | 125 | 1.2 | |
| Turnout | | 3,989 | 55.8 | |
| 3 Members changed to Ind. Protectionist from Protectionist | | | | |

Thomas Ewing, Bruce Nicoll and John Perry whilst Protectionists, supported the Free Trade government of Sir Henry Parkes.

=== Elections in the 1880s ===
==== 1889 ====
1889 New South Wales colonial election: The Richmond Wednesday 13 February
| Party | Candidate | Votes | % | ±% |
|---|---|---|---|---|
| Protectionist | Thomas Ewing (elected 1) | 2,862 | 33.3 | |
| Protectionist | Bruce Nicoll (elected 2) | 2,525 | 29.4 | |
| Protectionist | John Perry (elected 3) | 1,973 | 23.0 | |
| Protectionist | William Bourke | 1,231 | 14.3 | |
| Total formal votes | | 8,591 | 99.7 | |
| Informal votes | | 24 | 0.3 | |
| Turnout | | 3,262 | 55.0 | |
| Protectionist hold 2 and win 1 | | (1 new seat) | | |

==== 1887 ====
1887 New South Wales colonial election: The Richmond Saturday 26 February
| Party | Candidate | Votes | % | ±% |
|---|---|---|---|---|
| Protectionist | Thomas Ewing (re-elected 1) | 2,153 | 42.0 | |
| Protectionist | Frederick Crouch (elected 2) | 1,950 | 38.0 | |
| Free Trade | James Barrie | 659 | 12.9 | |
| Free Trade | R Lopez | 366 | 7.1 | |
| Total formal votes | | 5,128 | 99.5 | |
| Informal votes | | 27 | 0.5 | |
| Turnout | | 2,828 | 54.7 | |

==== 1885 ====
1885 New South Wales colonial election: The Richmond Wednesday 28 October
| Candidate | Votes | % |
|---|---|---|
| Thomas Ewing (elected 1) | 1,922 | 40.9 |
| Patrick Hogan (elected 2) | 1,454 | 30.9 |
| Frederick Crouch | 1,280 | 27.2 |
| George Dibbs | 46 | 1.0 |
| Total formal votes | 4,702 | 99.2 |
| Informal votes | 40 | 0.8 |
| Turnout | 2,796 | 59.9 |
| | (1 new seat) | |

==== 1882 ====
1882 New South Wales colonial election: The Richmond Saturday 9 December
| Candidate | Votes | % |
|---|---|---|
| Samuel Gray (elected) | 1,046 | 60.4 |
| Patrick Hogan | 686 | 39.6 |
| Total formal votes | 1,732 | 97.4 |
| Informal votes | 47 | 2.6 |
| Turnout | 1,779 | 60.8 |

==== 1880 ====
1880 New South Wales colonial election: The Richmond Wednesday 24 November
| Candidate | Votes | % |
|---|---|---|
| Charles Fawcett (re-elected) | unopposed | |
| | (new seat) | |

The Richmond was created from the northern part of The Clarence and Charles Fawcett was the member for The Clarence.
