= Electoral results for the district of Hastings and Macleay =

Election results for Hastings and Macleay, New South Wales, Australia

The Hastings and The Macleay, an electoral district of the Legislative Assembly in the Australian state of New South Wales was created in 1894 and abolished in 1920.

Election	Member	Party
1894	Francis Clarke	Protectionist
1895	Francis Clarke	Protectionist
1898	Francis Clarke	National Federal
1898 by	Edmund Barton	National Federal
1900 by	Francis Clarke	Protectionist
1901	Robert Davidson	Liberal Reform
1903	Robert Davidson	Liberal Reform
1907	Robert Davidson	Liberal Reform
1910	Henry Morton	Independent
1913	Henry Morton	Independent
1917	Henry Morton	Nationalist

== Election results ==
=== Elections in the 1910s ===
==== 1917 ====
1917 New South Wales state election: Hastings and Macleay
Party	Candidate	Votes	%	±%
Nationalist	Henry Morton	4,528	64.4	+64.4
Labor	Hercules Rowe	2,506	35.6	+35.6
Total formal votes		7,034	99.1	+0.7
Informal votes		63	0.9	−0.7
Turnout		7,097	61.4	−17.0
Member changed to Nationalist from Independent				

==== 1913 ====
1913 New South Wales state election: Hastings and Macleay
Party	Candidate	Votes	%	±%
Independent	Henry Morton	4,515	52.9	
Farmers and Settlers	Robert Davidson (Note: Also endorsed by Liberal Reform.)	4,025	47.1	
Total formal votes		8,540	98.4	
Informal votes		135	1.6	
Turnout		8,675	78.4	
Independent hold				

==== 1910 ====
1910 New South Wales state election: The Hastings and The Macleay
Party	Candidate	Votes	%	±%
Liberal Reform	Robert Davidson	2,661	45.1	−4.3
Independent	Henry Morton	2,117	35.9	
Labour	Hugh Bridson	1,120	19.0	
Total formal votes		5,898	97.8	+1.0
Informal votes		130	2.2	−1.0
Turnout		6,028	73.4	+6.8

1910 New South Wales state election: Hastings and Macleay - Second Round
Party	Candidate	Votes	%	±%
Independent	Henry Morton	3,467	54.9	
Liberal Reform	Robert Davidson (defeated)	2,849	45.1	−4.3
Total formal votes		6,316	99.1	+2.3
Informal votes		57	0.9	−2.3
Turnout		6,373	77.6	+11.0
Independent gain from Liberal Reform				

=== Elections in the 1900s ===
==== 1907 ====
1907 New South Wales state election: Hastings and Macleay
Party	Candidate	Votes	%	±%
Liberal Reform	Robert Davidson	2,334	49.4	
Independent	Edward Noonan	2,002	42.4	
Independent	William Newton	387	8.2	
Total formal votes		4,723	96.8	
Informal votes		156	3.2	
Turnout		4,879	66.6	
Liberal Reform hold				

==== 1904 ====
1904 New South Wales state election: The Hastings and The Macleay
Party	Candidate	Votes	%	±%
Liberal Reform	Robert Davidson	2,303	57.4	
Progressive	Percival Basche	1,709	42.6	
Total formal votes		4,012	98.7	
Informal votes		52	1.3	
Turnout		4,064	62.9	
Liberal Reform hold				

The Hastings and The Macleay was expanded to include part of the abolished seat of The Manning. The member for The Hastings and The Macleay was Robert Davidson (Liberal Reform). The member for The Manning was John Thomson (Progressive) who unsuccessfully contested Gloucester.

==== 1901 ====
1901 New South Wales state election: The Hastings and The Macleay
Party	Candidate	Votes	%	±%
Liberal Reform	Robert Davidson	578	28.9	
Progressive	Percival Basche	420	21.0	
Independent	Edward Noonan	403	20.2	
Independent	Otho Dangar	376	18.8	
Independent	Hugh Bridson	220	11.0	
Total formal votes		1,997	99.3	
Informal votes		14	0.7	
Turnout		2,011	74.6	
Liberal Reform gain from Progressive				

The sitting member was Francis Clarke (Progressive) who did not contest the election as he had been elected in March 1901 to the federal seat of Cowper.

==== 1900 by-election ====
1900 Hastings and Macleay by-election Thursday 1 March
Party	Candidate	Votes	%	±%
Protectionist	Francis Clarke	616	47.3	
Independent	Hugh Bridson	413	31.7	
Independent	Percival Basche	273	21.0	
Total formal votes		1,302	98.7	
Informal votes		17	1.3	
Turnout		1,319	53.9	
Protectionist hold				

Edmund Barton (Protectionist) resigned to travel to London with Alfred Deakin and Charles Kingston to explain the federation bill to the British Government.

=== Elections in the 1890s ===
==== 1898 by-election ====
1898 Hastings and Macleay by-election Friday 23 September
Party	Candidate	Votes	%	±%
National Federal	Edmund Barton (elected)	960	59.3	
Free Trade	Sydney Smith	658	40.7	
Total formal votes		1,618	99.7	
Informal votes		4	0.3	
Turnout		1,622	66.8	
National Federal hold				

Francis Clarke (National Federal) resigned to allow Edmund Barton to re-enter parliament.

==== 1898 ====
1898 New South Wales colonial election: The Hastings and The Macleay
Party	Candidate	Votes	%	±%
National Federal	Francis Clarke	unopposed		
National Federal hold				

==== 1895 ====
1895 New South Wales colonial election: The Hastings and The Macleay
Party	Candidate	Votes	%	±%
Protectionist	Francis Clarke	791	51.8	
Free Trade	Walter Vivian	736	48.2	
Total formal votes		1,527	99.1	
Informal votes		14	0.9	
Turnout		1,541	69.9	
Protectionist hold				

==== 1894 ====
1894 New South Wales colonial election: The Hastings and The Macleay
Party	Candidate	Votes	%	±%
Protectionist	Francis Clarke	668	36.7	
Free Trade	Walter Vivian	556	30.6	
Ind. Protectionist	Otho Dangar	494	27.2	
Ind. Protectionist	Enoch Rudder	61	3.4	
Labour	Henry Stuart	40	2.2	
Total formal votes		1,819	98.6	
Informal votes		26	1.4	
Turnout		1,845	82.4	
Protectionist win		(new seat)		
