= Electoral results for the district of Hastings and Manning =

Election results for Hastings and Manning, New South Wales, Australia

The Hastings and Manning, an electoral district of the Legislative Assembly in the Australian state of New South Wales was created in 1880 and abolished in 1894.

Election	Member	Party	Member	Party
1880	James Young	None	Joseph Andrews	None
1882	James Young	None	Charles Roberts	None
1885	James Young	None	Charles Roberts	None
1887	James Young	Free Trade	Charles Roberts	Free Trade
1889	James Young	Free Trade	Charles Roberts	Free Trade
1890 by	James Young	Free Trade	Walter Vivian	Free Trade
1891	James Young	Free Trade	Hugh McKinnon	Protectionist

== Election results ==
=== Elections in the 1890s ===
==== 1891 ====
1891 New South Wales colonial election: The Hastings and Manning Saturday 20 June
Party	Candidate	Votes	%	±%
Free Trade	James Young (re-elected 1)	1,246	25.4	
Protectionist	Hugh McKinnon (elected 2)	1,236	25.2	
Free Trade	Walter Vivian (defeated)	1,231	25.1	
Protectionist	John Ruthven	1,198	24.4	
Total formal votes		4,911	100.0	
Informal votes		0	0.0	
Turnout		2,470	72.8	
Free Trade hold 1				
Protectionist gain 1 from Free Trade				

==== 1890 by-election ====
1890 The Hastings and Manning by-election Saturday 5 April
Party	Candidate	Votes	%	±%
Free Trade	Walter Vivian (elected)	1,236	52.5	
Protectionist	Hugh McKinnon	1,117	47.5	
Total formal votes		2,353	100.0	
Informal votes		0	0.0	
Turnout		2,353	73.4	
Free Trade hold				

Charles Roberts (Free Trade) resigned.

=== Elections in the 1880s ===
==== 1889 ====
1889 New South Wales colonial election: The Hastings and Manning Saturday 9 February
Party	Candidate	Votes	%	±%
Free Trade	James Young (elected 1)	1,065	25.3	
Free Trade	Charles Roberts (elected 2)	1,063	25.2	
Protectionist	Hugh McKinnon	1,044	24.8	
Protectionist	John Ruthven	1,040	24.7	
Total formal votes		4,212	99.6	
Informal votes		19	0.5	
Turnout		2,166	69.5	
Free Trade hold 2				

==== 1887 ====
1887 New South Wales colonial election: The Hastings and Manning Wednesday 9 February
Party	Candidate	Votes	%	±%
Free Trade	Charles Roberts (re-elected 1)	1,195	40.7	
Free Trade	James Young (re-elected 2)	1,107	37.7	
Protectionist	Walter Targett (defeated)	635	21.6	
Total formal votes		2,937	99.5	
Informal votes		15	0.5	
Turnout		1,628	55.5	

Walter Targett was the member for Hartley

==== 1885 ====
1885 New South Wales colonial election: The Hastings and Manning Tuesday 20 October
Candidate	Votes	%
James Young (re-elected 1)	1,229	39.9
Charles Roberts (re-elected 2)	883	28.7
Hugh McKinnon	499	16.2
G W Tait	466	15.1
Total formal votes	3,077	99.5
Informal votes	16	0.5
Turnout	1,720	66.4

==== 1882 ====
1882 New South Wales colonial election: The Hastings and Manning Tuesday 12 December
Candidate	Votes	%
James Young (re-elected 1)	946	42.1
Charles Roberts (elected 2)	673	30.0
Daniel Macquarie	627	27.9
Total formal votes	2,246	99.3
Informal votes	15	0.7
Turnout	2,261	47.8

==== 1880 ====
1880 New South Wales colonial election: The Hastings and Manning Saturday 27 November
Candidate	Votes	%
James Young (elected 1)	897	30.6
Joseph Andrews (elected 2)	792	27.0
Daniel Macquarie	428	14.6
Charles McDonnell	383	13.1
William Gill	214	7.3
Henry Zions	135	4.6
Total formal votes	82	100.0
Informal votes	2,931	0.0
Turnout	2,961	64.2
	(new seat)	

Replaced the abolished district of The Hastings. The sitting member Robert Smith successfully contested The Macleay.
