= Electoral results for the district of Sydney-Phillip =

Election results for Sydney-Phillip, New South Wales, Australia

Sydney-Phillip, an electoral district of the Legislative Assembly in the Australian state of New South Wales, was created in 1894 and abolished in 1904.

Election	Member	Party
1894	Robert Fowler	Free Trade
1895	Dick Meagher	Protectionist
1895 by	Henry Copeland	Protectionist
1898	Henry Copeland	National Federal
1900 by	Daniel O'Connor	Protectionist
1901	Daniel O'Connor	Progressive

== Election results ==
=== Elections in the 1900s ===
==== 1901 ====
1901 New South Wales state election: Sydney-Phillip
Party	Candidate	Votes	%	±%
Progressive	Daniel O'Connor	676	41.4	−16.1
Liberal Reform	John Moloney	514	31.5	−2.8
Labour	George Barnett	442	27.1	
Total formal votes		1,632	99.6	+0.3
Informal votes		6	0.4	−0.3
Turnout		1,638	54.1	+2.9
Progressive hold				

==== 1900 by-election ====
1900 Sydney-Phillip by-election Saturday 9 June
Party	Candidate	Votes	%	±%
Protectionist	Daniel O'Connor	453	51.9	−5.6
Labour	Robert Hollis	319	36.5	
Independent Liberal	John Moloney	101	11.6	
Total formal votes		873	98.8	−0.5
Informal votes		11	1.2	+0.5
Turnout		884	30.8	−20.4
Protectionist hold				

Henry Copeland (Protectionist) was appointed Agent-General in London.

=== Elections in the 1890s ===
==== 1898 ====
1898 New South Wales colonial election: Sydney-Phillip
Party	Candidate	Votes	%	±%
National Federal	Henry Copeland	721	57.5	
Free Trade	Robert Hollis	430	34.3	
Ind. Free Trade	Ralph Hodgson	103	8.2	
Total formal votes		1,254	99.3	
Informal votes		9	0.7	
Turnout		1,263	51.2	
National Federal hold				

==== 1895 by-election ====
1895 Sydney-Phillip by-election Monday 14 October
Party	Candidate	Votes	%	±%
Protectionist	Henry Copeland	426	47.3	−7.4
Free Trade	Ralph Hodgson	303	33.9	−11.4
Labour	James Wilson	163	18.2	
Ind. Protectionist	James Hanrahan (Note: James Hanrahan and William Dumbrell withdrew prior to the poll.)	4	0.5	
Ind. Free Trade	William Dumbrell	1	0.1	
Total formal votes		894	99.2	−0.1
Informal votes		7	0.8	+0.1
Turnout		901	46.2 (Note: Estimate based on a roll of 1,949 at the July 1895 election.)	−15.6
Protectionist hold				

Dick Meagher (Protectionist) resigned in disgrace in relation to the pardon of George Dean.

==== 1895 ====
1895 New South Wales colonial election: Sydney-Phillip
Party	Candidate	Votes	%	±%
Protectionist	Dick Meagher	655	54.7	
Free Trade	Robert Fowler	542	45.3	
Total formal votes		1,197	99.3	
Informal votes		8	0.7	
Turnout		1,205	61.8	
Protectionist gain from Free Trade				

==== 1894 ====
1894 New South Wales colonial election: Sydney-Phillip
Party	Candidate	Votes	%	±%
Free Trade	Robert Fowler	635	41.5	
Protectionist	William Manning	518	33.8	
Labour	James Wilson	364	23.8	
Ind. Free Trade	Charles Renshaw	15	1.0	
Total formal votes		1,532	98.5	
Informal votes		24	1.5	
Turnout		1,556	78.6	
Free Trade win		(new seat)		
