= Electoral results for the district of Macleay =

Election results for Macleay, New South Wales, Australia

The Macleay, an electoral district of the Legislative Assembly in the Australian state of New South Wales, was created in 1880 and abolished in 1894.

Election	Member	Party		
1880	Robert Smith	None		
1882	Robert Smith	None		
1885	Robert Smith	None		
1887	Robert Smith	Protectionist	Member	Party
1889	Otho Dangar	Protectionist	Patrick Hogan	Protectionist
1891	Otho Dangar	Protectionist	Patrick Hogan	Protectionist
1893 by	Francis Clarke	Protectionist	Patrick Hogan	Protectionist

== Election results ==
=== Elections in the 1890s ===
==== 1893 by-election ====
1893 The Macleay by-election Monday 29 May
Party	Candidate	Votes	%	±%
Protectionist	Francis Clarke (elected)	1,035	55.0	
Ind. Protectionist	Otho Dangar (defeated)	846	45.0	
Total formal votes		1,881	100.0	
Informal votes		0	0.0	
Turnout		1,881	59.8 (Note: estimate based on an electoral roll of 3,148 at the 1891 election.)	
Protectionist gain from Ind. Protectionist		Swing		

The by-election was caused by the resignation of Otho Dangar (Protectionist) due to bankruptcy.

==== 1891 ====
1891 New South Wales colonial election: The Macleay Monday 22 June
Party	Candidate	Votes	%	±%
Ind. Protectionist	Otho Dangar (re-elected 1)	1,042	27.7	
Protectionist	Patrick Hogan (re-elected 2)	761	20.2	
Protectionist	John McLaughlin	721	19.2	
Protectionist	E Rudder	683	18.1	
Protectionist	L Boshell	558	14.8	
Total formal votes		3,765	99.5	
Informal votes		21	0.6	
Turnout		2,225	70.7	
Protectionist hold 1				
Member changed to Ind. Protectionist from Protectionist				

Otho Dangar whilst a Protectionist, supported the Free Trade government of Sir Henry Parkes.

=== Elections in the 1880s ===
==== 1889 ====
1889 New South Wales colonial election: The Macleay Saturday 16 February
Party	Candidate	Votes	%	±%
Protectionist	Patrick Hogan (elected 1)	1,201	34.5	
Protectionist	Otho Dangar (elected 2)	1,145	32.9	
Free Trade	Charles Jeanneret	272	7.8	
Free Trade	Edmund Woodhouse	208	6.0	
Protectionist	Phillip Hill	204	5.9	
Protectionist	Alfred Salmon	196	5.6	
Protectionist	Enoch Rudder	139	4.0	
Protectionist	Frederick Panton	118	3.4	
Total formal votes		3,483	98.7	
Informal votes		46	1.3	
Turnout		1,993	55.6	
Protectionist hold 1 and win 1		(1 new seat)		

Charles Jeanneret (Free Trade) was the sitting member for Carcoar.

==== 1887 ====
1887 New South Wales colonial election: The Macleay Wednesday 23 February
Party	Candidate	Votes	%	±%
Protectionist	Robert Smith (re-elected)	945	58.0	
Ind. Protectionist	Enoch Rudder	684	42.0	
Total formal votes		1,629	98.1	
Informal votes		31	1.9	
Turnout		1,660	54.8	

==== 1885 ====
1885 New South Wales colonial election: The Macleay Monday 19 October
Candidate	Votes	%
Robert Smith (re-elected)	1,108	69.0
Otho Dangar	499	31.1
Total formal votes	1,607	97.5
Informal votes	41	2.5
Turnout	1,648	64.0

==== 1882 ====
1882 New South Wales colonial election: The Macleay Friday 8 December
Candidate	Votes	%
Robert Smith (re-elected)	685	65.5
Enoch Rudder	361	34.5
Total formal votes	1,046	98.5
Informal votes	16	1.5
Turnout	1,062	56.1

==== 1880 ====
1880 New South Wales colonial election: The Macleay Tuesday 23 November
Candidate	Votes	%
Robert Smith (re-elected)	unopposed	
	(new seat)	

Robert Smith was the member for the abolished district of The Hastings.
