= 1895 Sydney-Phillip colonial by-election =

By-election in New South Wales, Australia

A by-election for the seat of Sydney-Phillip in the New South Wales Legislative Assembly was held on 14 October 1895 because of the resignation of Dick Meagher (Protectionist).

== Background ==
Meagher had defended George Dean who had been charged with attempting to murder his wife. Dean was convicted and sentenced to death, however Meagher managed to persuade two out of three royal commissioners to find that the conviction was unsafe and, as a result, Dean was pardoned. The publicity from the case helped Meagher win the election for Sydney-Phillip in July 1895. Rumours began to circulate that Dean had confessed to buying the poison. Jack Want, the Attorney General, read to the Legislative Council an account by Sir Julian Salomons of his conversation with Meagher, in which Meagher told Salomons that Dean had confessed to Meagher. Meagher initially denied the accusation, however subsequently confessed stating "I am determined to endure mental torture no longer, nor to stifle the voice of truth ... This awful lesson of my life I will endeavour to atone for in another clime. My resignation of my seat in Parliament accompanies this declaration".

Sir Henry Parkes announced himself as a candidate, however he withdrew prior to the nominations.

== Dates ==
Date	Event
6 April 1895	George Dean sentenced to death for attempted murder.
24 July 1895	Sydney-Phillip election.
25 September 1895	Attorney General, Jack Want, read to the Legislative Council Salomons account of his conversation with Meagher.
8 October 1895	Meagher confessed and resigned from parliament.
9 October 1895	Writ of election issued by the Speaker of the Legislative Assembly.
15 October 1895	Nominations
17 October 1895	Polling day
21 October 1895	Return of writ

== Result ==
1895 Sydney-Phillip by-election Monday 14 October
Party	Candidate	Votes	%	±%
Protectionist	Henry Copeland	426	47.3	−7.4
Free Trade	Ralph Hodgson	303	33.9	−11.4
Labour	James Wilson	163	18.2	
Ind. Protectionist	James Hanrahan (Note: James Hanrahan and William Dumbrell withdrew prior to the poll.)	4	0.5	
Ind. Free Trade	William Dumbrell	1	0.1	
Total formal votes		894	99.2	−0.1
Informal votes		7	0.8	+0.1
Turnout		901	46.2 (Note: Estimate based on a roll of 1,949 at the July 1895 election.)	−15.6
Protectionist hold				

== Aftermath ==
Meagher was struck off the roll of solicitors and was convicted of conspiracy to pervert the cause of justice, but the conviction was quashed on appeal. Meagher was returned to the Legislative Assembly as the member for Tweed at the election in 1895. It would take 25 years and an act of parliament before he was re-admitted as a solicitor.

== See also ==
- Electoral results for the district of Sydney-Phillip
- List of New South Wales state by-elections
