= 1890 Hastings and Manning colonial by-election =

By-election in New South Wales, Australia

A by-election was held for the New South Wales Legislative Assembly electorate of The Hastings and Manning on 5 April 1890 because of the resignation of Charles Roberts (Free Trade) to visit England.

== Dates ==
Date	Event
13 March 1890	Charles Roberts resigned.
14 March 1890	Writ of election issued by the Speaker of the Legislative Assembly.
31 March 1890	Nominations
5 April 1890	Polling day
26 April 1890	Return of writ

== Result ==
1890 The Hastings and Manning by-election Saturday 5 April
Party	Candidate	Votes	%	±%
Free Trade	Walter Vivian (elected)	1,236	52.5	
Protectionist	Hugh McKinnon	1,117	47.5	
Total formal votes		2,353	100.0	
Informal votes		0	0.0	
Turnout		2,353	73.4	
Free Trade hold				

== See also ==
- Electoral results for the district of Hastings and Manning
- List of New South Wales state by-elections
