= Electoral results for the district of Uralla-Walcha =

Election results for Uralla-Walcha, New South Wales, Australia

Uralla-Walcha, an electoral district of the Legislative Assembly in the Australian state of New South Wales, was created in 1894 and abolished in 1904.

Election	Member	Party
1894	William Piddington	Ind. Free Trade
1895	William Piddington	Free Trade
1898	William Piddington	National Federal
June 1900 by	William Piddington	Protectionist
October 1900 by	Michael MacMahon	Protectionist
1901	Michael MacMahon	Progressive

== Election results ==
=== Elections in the 1900s ===
==== 1901 ====
1901 New South Wales state election: Uralla-Walcha
Party	Candidate	Votes	%	±%
Progressive	Michael MacMahon	572	46.6	−8.8
Liberal Reform	Charles Marsh	549	44.7	+39.9
Independent	James Watts	103	8.4	
Independent	Frank Townshend	3	0.2	
Total formal votes		1,227	98.6	+0.4
Informal votes		17	1.4	−0.4
Turnout		1,244	68.1	+10.3
Progressive hold				

==== October 1900 by-election ====
1900 Uralla-Walcha colonial by-election Saturday 27 October
Party	Candidate	Votes	%	±%
Protectionist	Michael MacMahon (elected)	331	33.7	
Free Trade	Charles Marsh	295	32.7	
Free Trade	Edmund Lonsdale	277	30.7	
Total formal votes		903	100.0	−
Informal votes		0	0.0	−
Turnout		903	50.4 (Note: based on a roll of 1,792 at the June 1900 by-election.)	+13.0
Protectionist hold				

William Piddington died.

==== June 1900 by-election ====
1900 Uralla-Walcha colonial by-election Saturday 9 June
Party	Candidate	Votes	%	±%
Protectionist	William Piddington (re-elected)	451	67.3	+11.9
Free Trade	Edmund Lonsdale	219	32.7	+27.9
Total formal votes		670	100.0	+1.8
Informal votes		0	0.0	−1.8
Turnout		670	37.4	−20.4
Protectionist hold				

William Piddington resigned.

=== Elections in the 1890s ===
==== 1898 ====
1898 New South Wales colonial election: Uralla-Walcha
Party	Candidate	Votes	%	±%
National Federal	William Piddington	550	55.4	
Independent Federalist	Robert Brown	395	39.8	
Free Trade	Cornelius Danahey	48	4.8	
Total formal votes		993	98.2	
Informal votes		18	1.8	
Turnout		1,011	57.8	
Member changed to National Federal from Free Trade				

==== 1895 ====
1895 New South Wales colonial election: Uralla-Walcha
Party	Candidate	Votes	%	±%
Free Trade	William Piddington	557	66.2	
Protectionist	James Proctor	285	33.9	
Total formal votes		842	97.1	
Informal votes		25	2.9	
Turnout		867	52.0	
Member changed to Free Trade from Ind. Free Trade				

==== 1894 ====
1894 New South Wales colonial election: Uralla-Walcha
Party	Candidate	Votes	%	±%
Ind. Free Trade	William Piddington	431	35.8	
Protectionist	Patrick O'Connor	349	29.0	
Free Trade	James Leece	232	19.3	
Ind. Protectionist	Charles Givney	74	6.2	
Independent	John Gardiner	50	4.2	
Independent	John Campbell	46	3.8	
Independent Labour	Hugh Healy	14	1.2	
Ind. Free Trade	Edmund Moberly	7	0.6	
Total formal votes		1,203	97.2	
Informal votes		35	2.8	
Turnout		1,238	73.1	
Ind. Free Trade win		(new seat)		
