= Electoral results for the district of Manning =

Election results for Manning, New South Wales, Australia

Manning, until 1910 The Manning, an electoral district of the Legislative Assembly in the Australian state of New South Wales, had two incarnations, from 1894 to 1904 and from 1988 to 1991.

Election	Member	Party
1894	James Young	Free Trade
1895	James Young	Free Trade
1898	James Young	Free Trade
1901	John Thomson	Progressive
Election	Member	Party
1988	Wendy Machin	National

== Election results ==
=== Elections in the 1980s ===
==== 1988 ====
1988 New South Wales state election: Manning
Party	Candidate	Votes	%	±%
National	Wendy Machin	23,735	73.9	+20.2
Labor	John Tuite	8,391	26.1	−9.1
Total formal votes		32,126	97.3	−0.5
Informal votes		896	2.7	+0.5
Turnout		33,022	95.0	
National notional hold		Swing	+12.4	

District recreated

==== 1904 - 1988 ====
District abolished

=== Elections in the 1900s ===
==== 1901 ====
1901 New South Wales state election: The Manning
Party	Candidate	Votes	%	±%
Progressive	John Thomson	911	50.5	+9.1
Liberal Reform	James Young	893	49.5	−9.1
Total formal votes		1,804	99.7	+0.2
Informal votes		6	0.3	−0.2
Turnout		1,810	76.9	+2.3
Progressive gain from Liberal Reform				

=== Elections in the 1890s ===
==== 1898 ====
1898 New South Wales colonial election: The Manning
Party	Candidate	Votes	%	±%
Free Trade	James Young	933	58.6	
National Federal	David Cowan	658	41.4	
Total formal votes		1,591	99.4	
Informal votes		9	0.6	
Turnout		1,600	74.6	
Free Trade hold				

==== 1895 ====
1895 New South Wales colonial election: The Manning
Party	Candidate	Votes	%	±%
Free Trade	James Young	776	51.0	
Protectionist	Hugh McKinnon	745	49.0	
Total formal votes		1,521	99.6	
Informal votes		6	0.4	
Turnout		1,527	81.7	
Free Trade hold				

==== 1894 ====
1894 New South Wales colonial election: The Manning
Party	Candidate	Votes	%	±%
Free Trade	James Young	870	52.8	
Protectionist	Hugh McKinnon	777	47.2	
Total formal votes		1,647	99.2	
Informal votes		13	0.8	
Turnout		1,660	87.9	
Free Trade win		(new seat)		
