= 1898 Hastings and Macleay colonial by-election =

Election result for Hastings and Macleay, New South Wales, Australia

A by-election was held for the New South Wales Legislative Assembly electorate of Hastings and Macleay on 23 September 1898 because Francis Clarke (National Federal) resigned to allow Edmund Barton to re-enter parliament.

== Dates ==
Date	Event
27 July 1898	1898 New South Wales colonial election Edmund Barton defeated for Sydney-King.
27 August 1898	Francis Clarke resigned.
8 September 1898	Writ of election issued by the Speaker of the Legislative Assembly.
15 September 1898	Nominations
23 September 1898	Polling day
11 October 1898	Return of writ

== Result ==
1898 Hastings and Macleay by-election Friday 23 September
Party	Candidate	Votes	%	±%
National Federal	Edmund Barton (elected)	960	59.3	
Free Trade	Sydney Smith	658	40.7	
Total formal votes		1,618	99.7	
Informal votes		4	0.3	
Turnout		1,622	66.8	
National Federal hold				

== Aftermath ==
The election campaign of Sydney Smith was assisted by James Young, who was the Free Trade member for the neighbouring district of The Manning and Secretary for Public Works. Justice William Owen was subsequently appointed to conduct a Royal Commission into allegations concerning Young's conduct during the by-election, The major allegation was that the effect of Young's statements was that as Secretary for Public Works he would favour Smith more than Barton in dealing with the requirements of the electorate. Justice Owen found Young had not abused the powers of his office, however rebuked him for a "grave indiscretion" in the way he spoke.

== See also ==
- Electoral results for the district of Hastings and Macleay
- List of New South Wales state by-elections
