= 1900 Hastings and Macleay colonial by-election =

Election result for Hastings and Macleay, New South Wales, Australia

A by-election was held for the New South Wales Legislative Assembly electorate of Hastings and Macleay on 1 March 1900 because Edmund Barton (Protectionist) resigned to travel to London with Alfred Deakin and Charles Kingston to explain the federation bill to the British Government. Francis Clarke was the former member who had resigned in 1898 to allow Barton to re-enter parliament.

== Dates ==
Date	Event
7 February 1900	Edmund Barton resigned.
14 February 1900	Writ of election issued by the Speaker of the Legislative Assembly.
22 February 1900	Nominations
1 March 1900	Polling day
15 March 1900	Return of writ

== Result ==
1900 Hastings and Macleay by-election Thursday 1 March
Party	Candidate	Votes	%	±%
Protectionist	Francis Clarke	616	47.3	
Independent	Hugh Bridson	413	31.7	
Independent	Percival Basche	273	21.0	
Total formal votes		1,302	98.7	
Informal votes		17	1.3	
Turnout		1,319	53.9	
Protectionist hold				

== See also ==
- Electoral results for the district of Hastings and Macleay
- List of New South Wales state by-elections
