= October 1900 Uralla-Walcha colonial by-election =

Election result for Uralla-Walcha, New South Wales, Australia

A by-election for the seat of Uralla-Walcha in the New South Wales Legislative Assembly was held on 27 October 1900 because of the death of William Piddington (Protectionist).

== Dates ==
Date	Event
27 September 1900	Wiliiam Piddington died.
3 October 1900	Writ of election issued by the Speaker of the Legislative Assembly.
16 October 1900	Day of nomination
27 October 1900	Polling day
10 November 1900	Return of writ

== Result ==
1900 Uralla-Walcha colonial by-election Saturday 27 October
Party	Candidate	Votes	%	±%
Protectionist	Michael MacMahon (elected)	331	33.7	
Free Trade	Charles Marsh	295	32.7	
Free Trade	Edmund Lonsdale	277	30.7	
Total formal votes		903	100.0	−
Informal votes		0	0.0	−
Turnout		903	50.4 (Note: based on a roll of 1,792 at the June 1900 by-election.)	+13.0
Protectionist hold				

== See also ==
- Electoral results for the district of Uralla-Walcha
- List of New South Wales state by-elections
