= 1900 Sydney-Phillip colonial by-election =

Election result for Sydney-Phillip, New South Wales, Australia

A by-election was held for the New South Wales Legislative Assembly electorate of Sydney-Phillip on 9 June 1900 because of the resignation of Henry Copeland (Protectionist) who had accepted the position of Agent-General in London. Daniel O'Connor was previously a Free Trade member for West Sydney but had joined the Protectionist party for the 1898 Sydney-Pyrmont election.

== Dates ==
Date	Event
27 March 1900	Henry Copeland resigned.
4 June 1900	Writ of election issued by the Speaker of the Legislative Assembly.
8 June 1900	Nominations
9 June 1900	Polling day
16 June 1900	Return of writ

== Result ==
1900 Sydney-Phillip by-election Saturday 9 June
Party	Candidate	Votes	%	±%
Protectionist	Daniel O'Connor	453	51.9	−5.6
Labour	Robert Hollis	319	36.5	
Independent Liberal	John Moloney	101	11.6	
Total formal votes		873	98.8	−0.5
Informal votes		11	1.2	+0.5
Turnout		884	30.8	−20.4
Protectionist hold				

== See also ==
- Electoral results for the district of Sydney-Phillip
- List of New South Wales state by-elections
