= 1893 Macleay colonial by-election =

By-election in New South Wales, Australia

A by-election was held for the New South Wales Legislative Assembly electorate of Macleay on 29 May 1893 because of the resignation of Otho Dangar (Protectionist) due to insolvency.

== Dates ==
Date	Event
5 May 1893	Otho Dangar resigned.
8 May 1893	Writ of election issued by the Speaker of the Legislative Assembly.
22 May 1893	Nominations.
29 May 1893	Polling day
5 June 1893	Return of writ

== Result ==
1893 The Macleay by-election]] Monday 29 May
Party	Candidate	Votes	%	±%
Protectionist	Francis Clarke (elected)	1,035	55.0	
Ind. Protectionist	Otho Dangar (defeated)	846	45.0	
Total formal votes		1,881	100.0	
Informal votes		0	0.0	
Turnout		1,881	59.8 (Note: estimate based on an electoral roll of 3,148 at the 1891 election.)	
Protectionist gain from Ind. Protectionist		Swing		

== See also ==
- Electoral results for the district of Macleay
- List of New South Wales state by-elections
