= Henry Morton (politician) =

Australian politician (1867–1932)

The Honourable Henry Morton JP
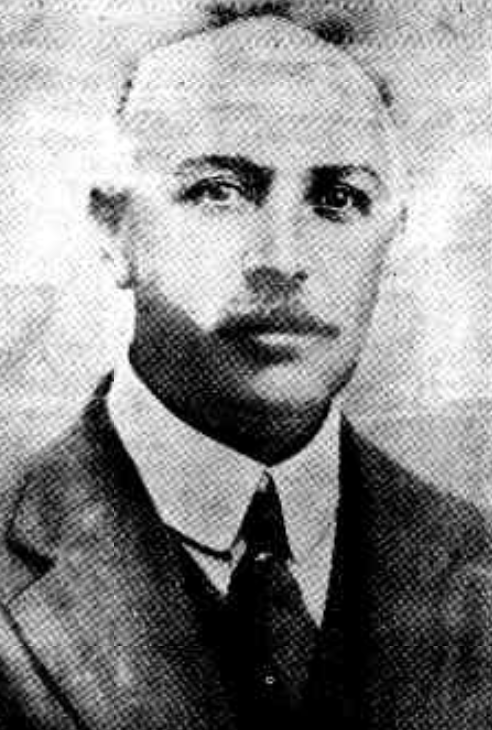
- Henry Morton

12th Speaker of the New South Wales Legislative Assembly
- In office 22 July 1913 – 22 December 1913
- Preceded by: Henry Willis
- Succeeded by: Dick Meagher

Member of the New South Wales Legislative Assembly for Hastings and Macleay
- In office 31 October 1910 – 18 February 1920
- Preceded by: Robert Davidson
- Succeeded by: Seat abolished

Personal details
- Born: 19 October 1867 Numbaa, Colony of New South Wales
- Died: 3 June 1932 (aged 64) Sydney, Australia
- Party: Independent (1910–1917); Nationalist (1917–1920)
- Relations: Philip Morton (brother); Mark Morton (brother); Pat Morton (nephew)
- Occupation: Businessman and estate manager

Military service
- Allegiance: United Kingdom
- Branch/service: (New South Wales) NSW Colonial Forces
- Years of service: 1896–1899
- Rank: Second lieutenant
- Unit: New South Wales Lancers

Henry Douglas Morton (19 October 1867 – 3 June 1932), often referred to as "Harry" or Harry D. Morton, was an Australian politician.

== Career ==
Born at Numbaa near Nowra to surveyor Henry Gordon Morton and Jane Fairles (his brothers Philip and Mark were also New South Wales politicians), he attended Numbaa Public School and then Hurstville College at Goulburn before becoming a bank teller at the Commercial Banking Company of Sydney. He married Maude Lillias Dangar, with whom he had two children. After a period farming on the Macleay River he joined his father in managing the Berry Estate on the Shoalhaven River around 1893. From 1896 to 1899 he was a 2nd lieutenant with the New South Wales Lancers. In 1910, he was elected to the New South Wales Legislative Assembly as the Independent member for Hastings and Macleay. He was Speaker of the Assembly from July to December 1913, completing the final months of Henry Willis's controversial term. He was re-elected in 1913 on a reduced margin. When the Nationalist Party was formed in 1917, Morton was one of those to join it. He left the Assembly in 1920 and died in 1932 in Sydney.

Morton was a lover of horses, especially jumpers: his Desmond was a famous high jumper.

He was cremated at Rookwood Crematorium, Sydney on 4 June 1932.

New South Wales Legislative Assembly
Preceded by Robert Davidson	Member for Hastings and Macleay; 1910–1920	Seat abolished
Preceded by Henry Willis	Speaker of the New South Wales Legislative Assembly; 1913	Succeeded by Dick Meagher
