= Robert Fowler (Australian politician) =

Australian politician

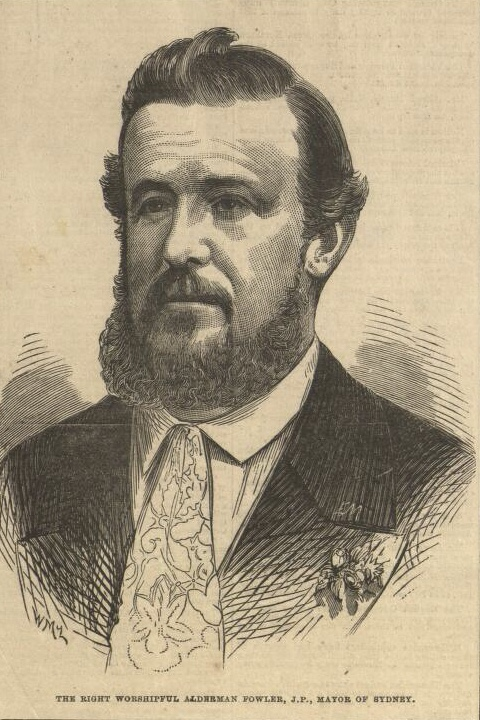
Robert Fowler, 1880

Robert Fowler (13 July 1840 – 12 June 1906) was an Australian politician.

He was born in Sydney to pottery manufacturer Enoch Fowler and Jane Lucas. After attending Christ Church School, he worked in his father's pottery business, becoming a partner when his father died in 1879. On 2 October 1867 he married Jane Seale, with whom he had eight children. Closely involved in local government, he served on Cook Municipal Council (1869–70, mayor 1870), Camperdown Municipal Council (1870–71, mayor 1870–71) and Sydney City Council (1872–87, 1890–1901, mayor 1880). In 1894 he was elected to the New South Wales Legislative Assembly as the Free Trade member for Sydney-Phillip. Defeated in 1895, he was appointed to the New South Wales Legislative Council, where he served until his death at Camperdown in 1906.

Civic offices
Preceded by James Bennett	Mayor of Cook; 1869 – 1870	Council abolished
Preceded by George Davison	Mayor of Camperdown; 1870 – 1872	Succeeded by Thomas Hinds
Preceded by Charles James Roberts	Mayor of Sydney; 1880	Succeeded by John Harris
New South Wales Legislative Assembly
New seat	Member for Sydney-Phillip; 1894 – 1895	Succeeded by Richard Meagher
