= Robert Davidson (Australian politician) =

Australian politician

Robert Davidson (4 September 1856 – 5 August 1931) was an Australian politician.

He was born in Mauchline in Ayrshire to fancy box manufacturer John Davidson and Mary Dalrymple. He attended the University of Glasgow and studied at the Free Church College. Arriving in Sydney in 1883, he married Jeanie Logan Muir on 31 August that year; they would have seven children. In 1884 he was ordained a minister in the Free Church of Scotland and given responsibility for Port Macquarie Parish, which he retained until his retirement in 1893 when he became proprietor of the Port Macquarie News. In 1901 he was elected to the New South Wales Legislative Assembly as the Liberal member for Hastings and Macleay, serving until his retirement in 1910. He retired to Kiama, where he was buried after his death in Forbes in 1931.

New South Wales Legislative Assembly
Preceded by Francis Clarke	Member for Hastings and Macleay; 1901–1910	Succeeded by Henry Morton
