= Walter Vivian =

Politician in New South Wales, Australia

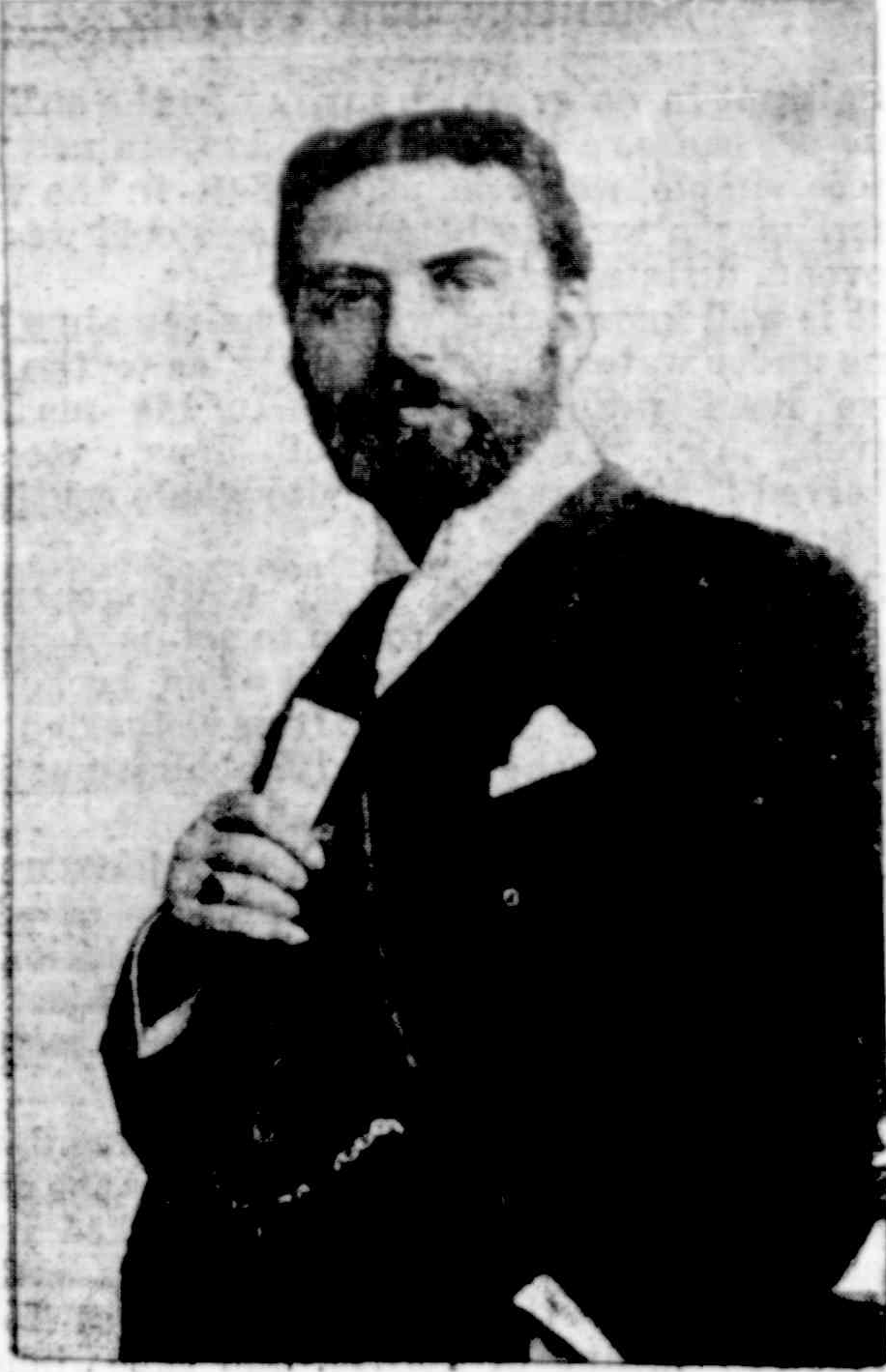
Walter Hussey Vivian, MLA for Hastings and Manning

Walter Hussey Vivian (c. 1851 – 6 November 1928) was an Australian politician.

== Early life ==
Little is known of him outside of the period in which he was active in New South Wales politics and his parliamentary biography contains little detail. His death notice, inserted by five of his daughters, lists him as aged 77 at his death, which would mean he was born in 1850 or 1851. A biography published by the Australian Town and Country Journal in 1890 states he was born in 1852, a member of the Vivian family, educated in England and Belgium, arriving in Australia in 1873 via Fiji. (Note: A Mr Vivian arrived in Melbourne on the Nil Desperandum from Fiji on 20 June 1874 and W H Vivian arrived in Sydney on the Hero from Melbourne on 10 July 1874.) On 10 August 1876, he married Eliza Alison and his marriage announcement stated that he was the fourth son of William Vivian Esq of 15 Bolton Gardens, London. In 1880, he was a squatter on the Bogan River, before returning to Sydney in 1885, becoming an estate agent.

== Parliamentary career ==
He was a regular Free Trade candidate for a seat in the New South Wales Legislative Assembly, standing unsuccessfully for Wollombi in 1885 and 1886, The Tumut and Glen Innes in 1889. In February 1890, he was elected an alderman for the Municipal District of Manly. He won a seat in the Legislative Assembly at the 1890 Hastings and Manning by-election. He was involved in an unruly scene in parliament involving his brother-in-law William Alison, described by George Dibbs as a petty family strife. Each accused the other of having a pecuniary interest in relation to the Crown Rents Bill, due to William Alison senior owning the Canonbar station near Nyngan. His parliamentary service lasted just over one year as he was defeated at The Hastings and Manning by just 5 votes. He lodged a petition against the election, however that was dismissed as frivolous and vexatious. He stood for The Hastings and Macleay at the 1894 and 1895 elections but was defeated on both occasions.

== Colonial exhibitions ==
Vivian was one of the New South Wales commissioners to the Colonial and Indian Exhibition of 1886 in London, in charge of the wool exhibits, the New South Wales Executive Commissioner for the Tasmanian International Exhibition of 1891–2 in Launceston, and one of the New South Wales commissioners to the World's Columbian Exposition of 1893 in Chicago, on the committees for wool and silk, manufacturing and liberal arts, education and ethnology.

== Later life and death ==
By 1891, Vivian had become a stock and share broker.

Sometime in the early 1900s, Vivian left Australia for South Africa, and in 1903 announced the death of his fourth daughter, Edith, at Johannesburg. He also lived at Durban before his death at Pinetown, Natal Province on 6 November 1928 (aged 77).

== Notes ==
New South Wales Legislative Assembly
Preceded by Charles Roberts	Member for Hastings and Manning; 1890–1891; With: James Young	Succeeded by Hugh McKinnon
