= Robert Pyers =

Australian politician

Robert Pyers (1 August 1847 – 19 October 1915) was an Australian politician.

Born in Seaham to butcher Abel Pyers and Margaret McDermott, he followed his father into butchery, becoming a carrier between Maitland and Glen Innes. Around 1870 he became a timber getter around the Clarence River before finding success at the Solferino and Lionsville gold fields, which allowed him to establish a store. He married Clara Taylor in 1869, with whom he had ten children. In 1873 unwise mining speculations led to his bankruptcy; he was discharged in 1875 and moved to Tatham on the Richmond River in 1880, returning to timber work. From 1884 to 1894 he was an alderman at Casino; he was bankrupted again in 1887 and moved to Casino to become an auctioneer. From 1894 to 1904 he was the member for The Richmond in the New South Wales Legislative Assembly, associated with the Protectionist and Progressive parties. Despite his opposition to Federation he contested several federal elections as an Independent. Pyers died at Casino in 1915.

== See also ==
- Members of the New South Wales Legislative Assembly
- 1894–1895
- 1895–1898
- 1898–1901
- 1901–1904
- Results of New South Wales state elections
- 1894 (The Richmond)
- 1895 (The Richmond)
- 1898 (The Richmond)
- 1901 (The Richmond)
- 1904 (Tenterfield)
- 1904 Tenterfield by-election
- 1907 (Tenterfield)
- 1910 (Tenterfield)
- Results of Australian federal elections
- 1901 (Richmond)
- 1910 (Richmond)

New South Wales Legislative Assembly
Preceded by Ewing, Nicoll & Perry	Member for The Richmond; 1894–1904	Succeeded by John Perry
