= Joseph Andrews (Australian politician) =

Australian politician (1814–1901)

Joseph Andrews (1814 – 9 January 1901) was an Irish-born Australian politician.

He was born at Coleraine in County Londonderry to farmer Samuel Andrews and Jane Woodside. In 1834 he married Ann Dickson at Glasgow; they had fifteen children. He migrated to Australia in 1841. In 1880 he was elected to the New South Wales Legislative Assembly for Hastings and Manning, but he did not re-contest the subsequent election in 1882. On 5 June 1888 he married Pauline Keogh. Andrews died at Wingham in 1901.

New South Wales Legislative Assembly
Preceded by Robert Smith as Member for Hastings	Member for Hastings and Manning; 1880–1882; Served alongside: James Young	Succeeded by Charles Roberts
