= June 1900 Uralla-Walcha colonial by-election =

Election result for Uralla-Walcha, New South Wales, Australia

A by-election for the seat of Uralla-Walcha in the New South Wales Legislative Assembly was held on 9 June 1900 because of the resignation of William Piddington (Protectionist), ostensibly for private reasons and was a candidate for re-election. It would appear that Piddington resigned due to insolvency as he was made bankrupt on his own petition on 25 May 1900.

The by-election for Canterbury was held on the same day.

== Dates ==
Date	Event
23 May 1900	William Piddington resigned.
25 May 1900	William Piddington was made bankrupt on his own petition.
25 May 1900	Writ of election issued by the Speaker of the Legislative Assembly.
2 June 1900	Day of nomination
9 June 1900	Polling day
21 June 1900	Return of writ

== Result ==
1900 Uralla-Walcha colonial by-election Saturday 9 June
Party	Candidate	Votes	%	±%
Protectionist	William Piddington (re-elected)	451	67.3	+11.9
Free Trade	Edmund Lonsdale	219	32.7	+27.9
Total formal votes		670	100.0	+1.8
Informal votes		0	0.0	−1.8
Turnout		670	37.4	−20.4
Protectionist hold				

== Aftermath ==
While William Piddington was re-elected, he died on 27 September 1900, resulting in a further by-election, where the seat was retained by the Protectionist party.

== See also ==
- Electoral results for the district of Uralla-Walcha
- List of New South Wales state by-elections
