= George Dean =

Australian criminal (1867-1933)

George Dean (14 November 1867 – 7 May 1933) was a ferry boat master in Sydney, Australia, who was charged with attempting to poison his wife. A large part of the Sydney public came to believe that Dean was innocent and that his wife and her mother had conspired against him. Although Dean was very likely guilty, his death sentence was commuted and he was later released on a free pardon. He was subsequently convicted of perjury and spent nine years in jail.

== Early life ==
Dean was born in Albury and worked as a blacksmith in Sydney from about 1880. He worked for the North Shore Steam Ferry Company from about 1884 and received a master's certificate in 1888. In 1890, he became night master of the Possum, operating between Circular Quay and Milsons Point. He was popular with his passengers and on four occasions dived into the harbour to save passengers from drowning.

== Attempted murder charge ==
In March 1894, Dean married Sarah Annie Gaynor, known as Mary Seymour, and daughter of Catherine Asbury, known as Caroline Seymour, who has been transported to Van Diemen's Land in 1852 for pickpocketing. The Deans settled in North Sydney and soon had a daughter. The Deans' marriage was strained by the presence of Dean's mother-in-law, and Mrs Dean was not happy about her mother's eviction in January 1895. Dean was charged with attempting to murder his wife in March on the basis of his wife's claimed symptoms and evidence of both arsenic and strychnine in lemon syrup and tea and medicines administered by Dean and fortunately preserved for the police investigation. Despite the unsatisfactory nature of some of the evidence, especially a lack of evidence for Dean buying or possessing the poisons, but under strong pressure from Justice Windeyer to come to a verdict, the jury found Dean guilty and the judge sentenced him to death.

== Royal commission ==
Nevertheless, public opinion quickly turned against the verdict, particularly noting the behaviour of Windeyer, who was already known as a "hanging judge" as a consequence of the Mount Rennie rape case. As a result, in May the Government appointed a Royal Commission composed of Francis Edward Rogers QC, Dr Philip Sydney Jones and Dr Frederic Norton Manning to consider the case. Paddy Crick and Dean's lawyer, Richard Meagher, presented abundant evidence to the Royal Commission that Seymour had been a procuress, brothel-keeper and pickpocket. The doctors found that the evidence was compatible with self-administration by Mrs Dean, presumably to incriminate Dean, while Rogers dissented strongly. As a result, the Government released Dean on a free pardon at the end of June and he was put in charge of a bigger ferry, the Wallaby.

== Perjury and conspiracy ==
On 18 July, Meagher boasted to Julian Salomons that after Dean's sentencing he had pretended to Dean that the police had found out where he had purchased the poison and Dean had admitted his guilt and named the chemist, R. J. Smith. Although Dean's confession to his lawyer was a matter of solicitor-client privilege, Salomons found himself compelled to pass on this information to the Attorney General, Jack Want. Rumours of Dean's confession began to circulate. In September, Want was questioned on it, but he declined to comment. On 24 September, Dean petitioned Parliament to clear his name and next day Want read Salomons' account of Meagher's conversation to the House. Although Meagher, who had meanwhile been elected as the member for Sydney-Phillip, vigorously denied the conversation in the House, Smith admitted giving Dean arsenic. As a result, Dean, Meagher, Crick, Meagher's assistant, Daniel Green, and a witness, Jane Reynolds, were charged with conspiring to pervert the course of justice. Dean was also charged with perjury and later signed a full confession to the charge, which he subsequently withdrew. Dean was found guilty of two charges of perjury and sentenced to 14 years imprisonment. Meagher and Dean were found guilty of conspiracy, but these convictions were quashed on appeal. Dean was released from Goulburn Gaol in December 1904 with remissions for good behaviour and returned to his job as ferry boat captain. He returned to the Riverina in 1913 and died of endocarditis in Hay, survived by his daughter.

== Popular culture ==
The story was filmed by the ABC in 1981 as the TV movie The Dean Case.
