= Electoral district of Macleay =

Former state electoral district of New South Wales, Australia

Macleay was an electoral district of the Legislative Assembly in the Australian state of New South Wales established in 1880 in the Macleay River area. Between 1889 and 1894, it elected two members with voters casting two votes and the two leading candidates being elected. In 1894, it was abolished, partly replaced by Raleigh. Under the spelling conventions of the time it was generally spelled M'Leay.

== Members for Macleay ==
Single-member (1880–1889)
Member	Party	Term			
Robert Smith	None	1880–1887			
Robert Smith	Protectionist	1887–1889			
Two members (1889–1894)
Member	Party	Term	Member	Party	Term
Otho Dangar	Protectionist	1889–1893	Patrick Hogan	Protectionist	1889–1894
Francis Clarke	Protectionist	1893–1894	Patrick Hogan	Protectionist	1889–1894

== Election results ==
1893 The Macleay by-election Monday 29 May
Party	Candidate	Votes	%	±%
Protectionist	Francis Clarke (elected)	1,035	55.0	
Ind. Protectionist	Otho Dangar (defeated)	846	45.0	
Total formal votes		1,881	100.0	
Informal votes		0	0.0	
Turnout		1,881	59.8 (Note: estimate based on an electoral roll of 3,148 at the 1891 election.)	
Protectionist gain from Ind. Protectionist		Swing		

The by-election was caused by the resignation of Otho Dangar (Protectionist) due to bankruptcy.
