= Frederick Crouch (politician) =

Australian politician

Frederick George Crouch (1 February 1843 – 1 January 1922) was an English-born Australian politician.

He was born in London to merchant William Crouch and Caroline Hart. He arrived in New South Wales in 1854 and opened a store on Richmond Road in Sydney. He also had interests in northern New South Wales, serving as alderman and mayor of Casino. On 7 January 1869 he married Ada Rebecca Gregory, with whom he had eleven children. Crouch was elected to the New South Wales Legislative Assembly in 1887 as a Protectionist member for Richmond, but he did not run for re-election in 1889. In 1894 he moved to Randwick, where he died in 1922.

New South Wales Legislative Assembly
Preceded by Patrick Hogan	Member for Richmond; 1887–1889; Served alongside: Ewing	Succeeded by Bruce Nicoll; John Perry
