= Electoral district of Hastings and Manning =

Former state electoral district of New South Wales, Australia

Hastings and Manning was an electoral district of the Legislative Assembly in the Australian state of New South Wales from 1880 to 1894. Created to succeed Hastings, it elected two members with voters casting two votes and the two leading candidates being elected. In 1894 it was divided between the single member districts of Hastings and Macleay and Manning.

== Members for Hastings and Manning ==
Member	Party	Term	Member	Party	Term
James Young	None	1880–1887	Joseph Andrews	None	1880–1882
James Young	None	1880–1887	Charles Roberts	None	1882–1887
James Young	Free Trade	1887–1894	Charles Roberts	Free Trade	1887–1890
James Young	Free Trade	1887–1894	Walter Vivian	Free Trade	1890–1891
James Young	Free Trade	1887–1894	Hugh McKinnon	Protectionist	1891–1894

== Election results ==
1891 New South Wales colonial election: The Hastings and Manning Saturday 20 June
Party	Candidate	Votes	%	±%
Free Trade	James Young (re-elected 1)	1,246	25.4	
Protectionist	Hugh McKinnon (elected 2)	1,236	25.2	
Free Trade	Walter Vivian (defeated)	1,231	25.1	
Protectionist	John Ruthven	1,198	24.4	
Total formal votes		4,911	100.0	
Informal votes		0	0.0	
Turnout		2,470	72.8	
Free Trade hold 1				
Protectionist gain 1 from Free Trade				
