= Charles James Roberts =

Australian politician

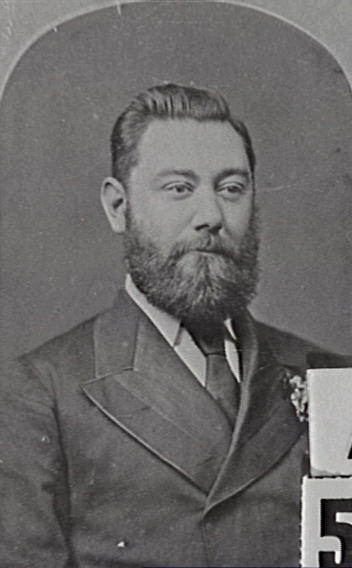
Alderman Charles James Roberts (1877-80) Mayor of Sydney 1879

Charles James Roberts CMG, (29 March 1846 – 14 August 1925) was a publican and politician in colonial New South Wales and Postmaster-General of New South Wales.

Roberts was the eldest son of Charles Warman Roberts, a publican of Sydney, New South Wales, and his wife Annie, née Marsden and educated at St James's Grammar School and Sydney Grammar School under William Stephens. Roberts went into business, becoming a licensed victualler. Roberts married in 1867 Lucretia, daughter of Abraham Abraham, of Sydney. Also in 1867 Roberts purchased the Crown and Anchor Hotel from his father, located on the corner of George and Market streets. In 1888 Roberts demolished this hotel and built a five-story hotel on the site, naming it the Robert's Hotel.

Roberts was Mayor of Sydney in 1879, the year of the International Exhibition, for which he was a member of the New South Wales Commission, as also of the Commissions for the exhibitions held in Melbourne in 1880, Amsterdam in 1883, Calcutta in 1883–4, London (Colonial and Indian) in 1886, and Centennial in 1888.

Roberts was member of the New South Wales Legislative Assembly for the Hastings and Manning district from 1882 to 1889, when he resigned to travel to England. He was Postmaster-General in the Henry Parkes Ministry from January 1887 to January 1889. Roberts was appointed a member of the New South Wales Legislative Council on 29 April 1890, serving until his death on 14 August 1925 (aged 79).

Parliament of New South Wales
Political offices
Preceded by Francis Wright	Postmaster-General; 1887–1889	Succeeded by Henry Clarke
New South Wales Legislative Assembly
Preceded by Joseph Andrews	Member for Hastings and Manning; 1882–1890; With: James Young	Succeeded by Walter Vivian
Civic offices
Preceded by James Merriman	Mayor of Sydney; 1879	Succeeded by Robert Fowler
