= Thomas Ewing (Australian politician) =

Australian politician

The Honourable Sir Thomas Ewing KCMG
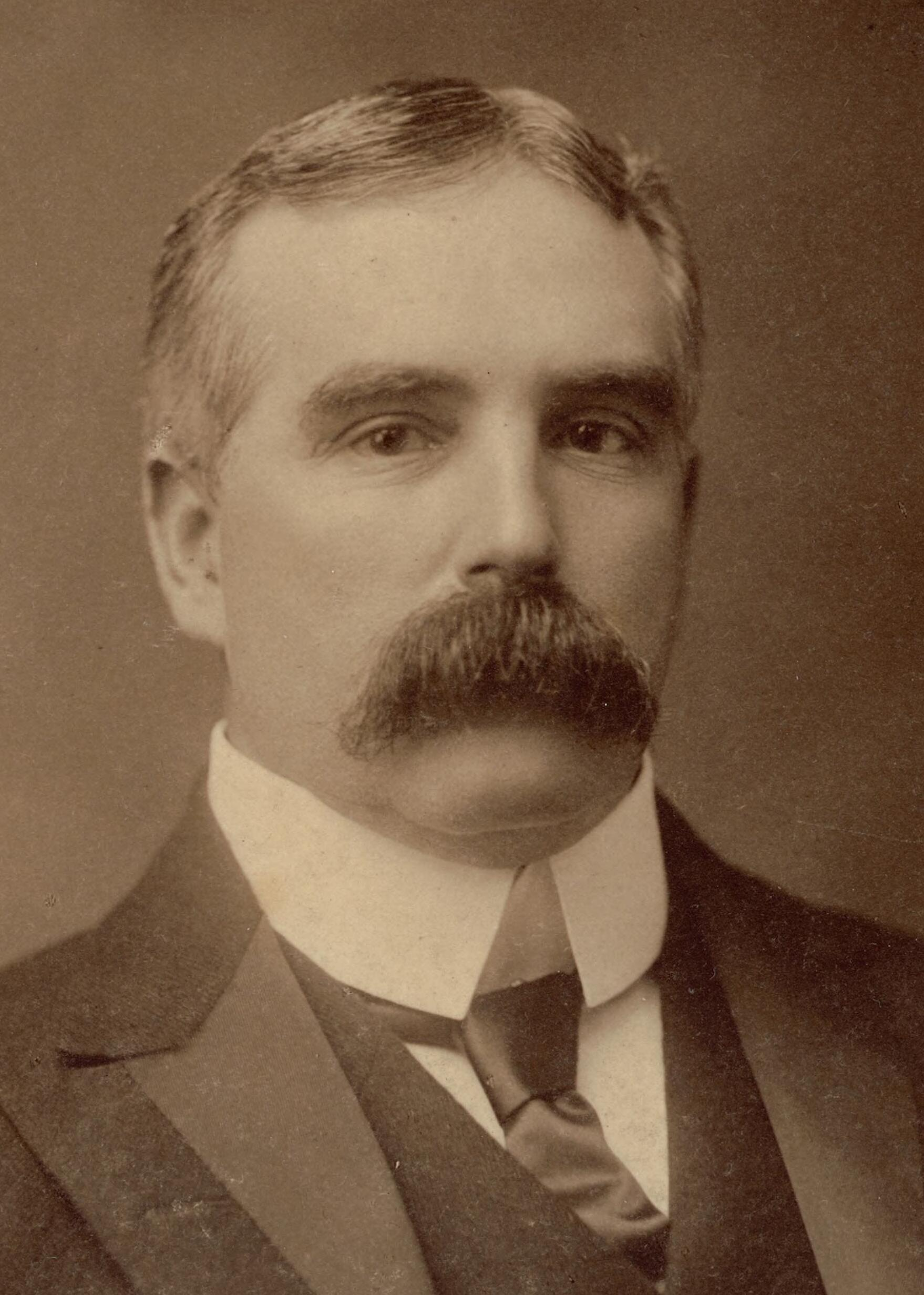

Minister for Defence
- In office 24 January 1907 – 13 November 1908
- Prime Minister: Alfred Deakin
- Preceded by: Thomas Playford
- Succeeded by: George Pearce

Minister for Home Affairs
- In office 12 October 1906 – 24 January 1907
- Prime Minister: Alfred Deakin
- Preceded by: Littleton Groom
- Succeeded by: John Keating

Member of the Australian Parliament for Richmond
- In office 29 March 1901 – 19 February 1910
- Preceded by: New seat
- Succeeded by: Walter Massy-Greene

Personal details
- Born: 9 October 1856 Pitt Town, New South Wales, Australia
- Died: 15 September 1920 (aged 63) Darlinghurst, New South Wales, Australia
- Party: Protectionist (to 1909); Liberal (from 1909)
- Spouse: Margaret Russell McCabe
- Relations: Norman Ewing (brother); John Ewing (brother)
- Occupation: Surveyor

Sir Thomas Thomson Ewing KCMG (9 October 1856 – 15 September 1920) was an Australian politician. He began his career in the New South Wales Legislative Assembly (1885–1901) before winning election to the Division of Richmond at the inaugural 1901 federal election. He held ministerial office in the second Deakin government as Vice-President of the Executive Council (1905–1906), Minister for Home Affairs (1906–1907), and Minister for Defence (1907–1908).

== Early life ==
Ewing was born at Pitt Town, New South Wales to clergyman Thomas Campbell Ewing and Elizabeth, née Thomson. Despite an intention to study for the Bar, he joined a surveyor's party at the age of 17, and became a licensed surveyor with the New South Wales Department of Lands in 1877. He married Margaret Russell MacCabe on 1 October 1879 at Wollongong, with whom he had three sons and two daughters, known as, Francis Peter Ewing born 1880, olive Margaret Ewing born in 1882, Thomas Campbell Ewing born in 1884, Helen M Ewing born in 1892, Colin Ewing born in 1894.

== State politics ==
In 1885 Ewing left the Lands Department to stand, successfully, for the New South Wales Legislative Assembly, representing the seat of Richmond. Although he was a "theoretical" supporter of free trade, he became a supporter of moderate protectionism, and, while a supporter of female suffrage, was an opponent of non-European immigration. In 1894 he transferred to the seat of Lismore, and became known as an independently minded member. A popular member, he became involved in Sydney's hydro-electricity scheme, fiscal policy and Federation, where he was a supporter of Sir Henry Parkes, Sir George Dibbs and Sir Patrick Jennings.

== Federal politics ==
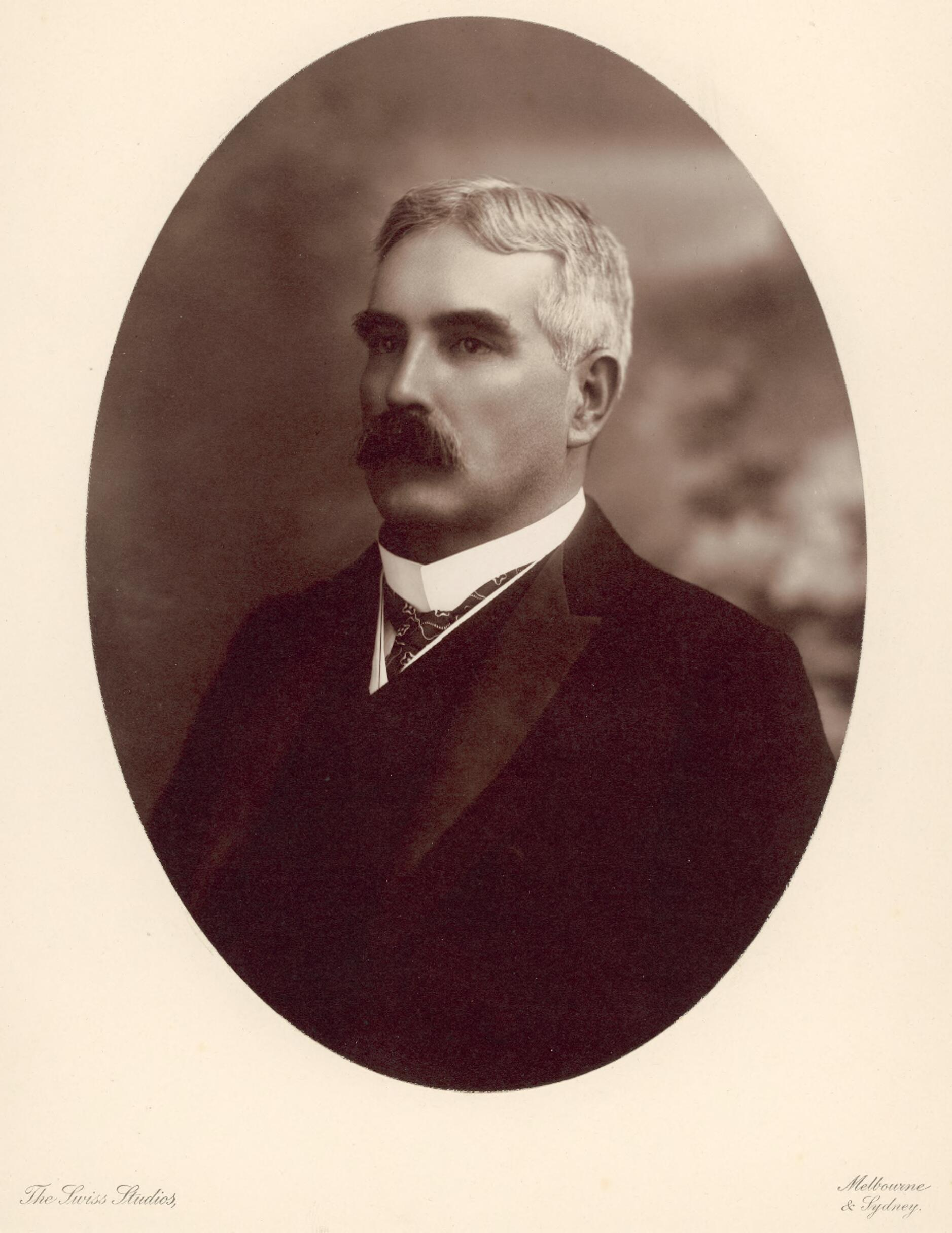
Sir Thomas Ewing

Ewing moved to federal politics in 1901, entering the Australian House of Representatives as the Protectionist member for Richmond. In the second administration of Alfred Deakin he was Vice-President of the Executive Council (1905–06), Minister for Home Affairs (1906–07), and Minister for Defence (1907–08). A strong supporter of the White Australia Policy and of compulsory military training, Ewing organised a scheme for such compulsory training, which was the basis of the 1909 Defence Act. Ewing retired from politics in 1910 due to ill health, and began farming on the Tweed River.

Ewing was an amiable and well-liked politician who had a gift for telling stories, of which he wrote many. He also wrote scholarly works and published Progress of Australasia During the Nineteenth Century with Sir Timothy Coghlan in 1903, and Review of the Rival Railway Schemes for the Connection of the Tableland of New England with a Deep Sea Port on the North Coast in 1913. Often scornful of the "titled mediocrities" of parliament, he was nonetheless knighted as a Knight Commander of the Order of St Michael and St George in 1908; this was said to have been recommended by Alfred Deakin as a joke, and, according to colleague Richard Crouch, Ewing took it as such.

== Later life ==
Ewing had little part in public life after his 1910 retirement. He died of heart and kidney disease in a Darlinghurst hospital on 15 September 1920. His younger brothers John and Norman also had distinguished political careers.

Political offices
Preceded by James Drake	Vice-President of the Executive Council; 1905–1906	Succeeded by John Keating
Preceded by Littleton Groom	Minister for Home Affairs; 1906–1907	Succeeded by John Keating
Preceded by Thomas Playford II	Minister for Defence; 1907–1908	Succeeded by George Pearce
New South Wales Legislative Assembly
Preceded by Samuel Gray	Member for Richmond; 1885–1894; Served alongside: Hogan/Crouch/Nicoll, None/Perry	Succeeded by Robert Pyers
Preceded by New seat	Member for Lismore; 1894–1901	Succeeded by John Coleman
Parliament of Australia
New title	Member for Richmond; 1901–1910	Succeeded by Walter Massy-Greene
