= James Henry Young =

Australian politician

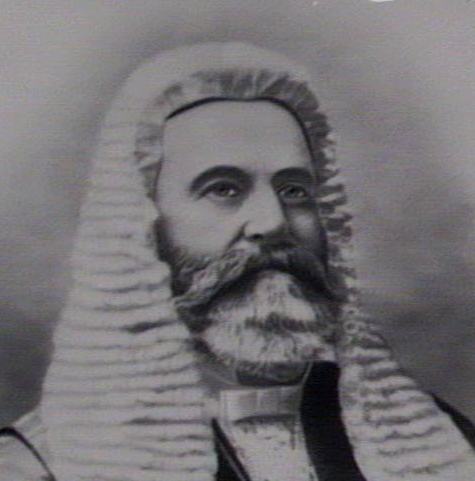
James Henry Young (1834–1908), NSW politician

James Henry Young (15 May 1834 – 9 May 1908) was an Australian colonial businessman and politician and Speaker of the New South Wales Legislative Assembly.

== Early life and business ==
Young was born at Moor Court, near Romsey, Hampshire to Martha née Druce and James Young, a farmer. At age 14 he was an apprentice with the Peninsular and Oriental Steam Navigation Company. He arrived in Sydney in August 1852 on the inaugural voyage of the Chusan, a steam ship that completed the voyage from Southampton in 80 days, a significant reduction from the usual 121–130 days. He spent two years working on the gold fields, however was not successful and took employment with the Sydney & Melbourne Steam Packet Co. He settled in the Port Macquarie region in the late 1850s, working as a harbour pilot then as a shop keeper. He married Ellen Kemp on 21 July 1859 at Port Macquarie. In around 1876 he established a business as a produce merchant in Sydney, with interest in coastal shipping.

== Political career ==
In 1880 Young contested the new district of Hastings and Manning which included Port Macquarie, finishing on top of the poll. He represented the district until the abolition of multi-member districts in 1894. He was appointed Minister of Public Instruction in the fifth Robertson Ministry from December 1885 to February 1886. He joined the Free Trade Party on its establishment in 1887 and was elected Speaker of the Assembly in March 1887, on a salary of £1,500 per year. He was a commissioner for New South Wales for the exhibition in Adelaide in 1887 and Melbourne in 1888. He was re-elected speaker after the 1889 election, but rowdy members of the assembly, such as John McElhone, Adolphus Taylor, Paddy Crick and William Willis were difficult for Young to deal with. In 1890 he entered into a compromise with his creditors in which they received one quarter of the value of their debts. The matter was raised in the Assembly and the Attorney General, George Simpson QC gave an opinion that Young was not disqualified from parliament as a court had not made a sequestration order. Crick moved that Young's seat be referred to the elections and qualifications committee, however this was defeated along party lines 52 to 30. The leader of the opposition, George Dibbs gave notice of a motion that would remove Young as Speaker and as a result he resigned on 21 October 1890.

His financial position recovered and he was appointed Secretary for Public Works in the fifth Parkes ministry on 14 August 1891 and held the post until the retirement of the ministry on 22 October 1891. Multi-member electorates were abolished in 1894 and Young successfully contested the new district of The Manning. He was appointed Secretary for Public Works in the Reid ministry on 3 August 1894 until a reshuffle on 3 July 1899 saw him moved to be Secretary for Lands. He assisted Sydney Smith at the 1898 Hastings and Macleay by-election against Edmund Barton. Justice William Owen was subsequently appointed to conduct a Royal Commission into allegations concerning his conduct during the by-election, The major allegation was that the effect of Young's statements were that he would favour Smith more than Barton in dealing with the requirements of the electorate. Justice Owen found Young had not abused the powers of his office, however rebuked him for a "grave indiscretion" in the way he spoke.

He was defeated for The Manning at the 1901 election by John Thomson. The Manning was abolished as a consequence of the 1903 New South Wales referendum, and partly absorbed by Gloucester. The sitting member for Gloucester, Richard Price, did not contest the election and Young defeated John Thompson at the Gloucester at the 1904 election, however the return of Richard Price saw Young defeated at the 1907 election.

== Later life and death ==
He died of heart failure in Chatswood on 9 May 1908 (aged 73), survived by his wife Ellen, six daughters and two sons.

Parliament of New South Wales
New South Wales Legislative Assembly
Preceded by Robert Smith as Member for Hastings	Member for Hastings and Manning; 1880–1894; Served alongside: Andrews, Roberts, Vivian, McKinnon	Succeeded by himself as Member for Manning
Preceded by himself and Hugh McKinnon as Member for Hastings and Manning	Member for Manning; 1894–1901	Succeeded by John Thomson
Preceded by Richard Price	Member for Gloucester; 1904–1907	Succeeded by Richard Price
Preceded by Edmund Barton	Speaker of the New South Wales Legislative Assembly; 1887–1890	Succeeded by Sir Joseph Abbott
Political offices
Preceded by William Trickett	Minister of Public Instruction; December 1885 – February 1886	Succeeded by Arthur Renwick
Preceded by Bruce Smith	Secretary for Public Works; August 1891 – October 1891	Succeeded by William Lyne
Preceded by William Lyne	Secretary for Public Works; August 1894 – July 1899	Succeeded by Charles Lee
Preceded by Joseph Carruthers	Secretary for Lands; July – September 1889	Succeeded by Thomas Hassall
