= Patrick Hogan (Australian politician) =

Australian politician (1835–1918)

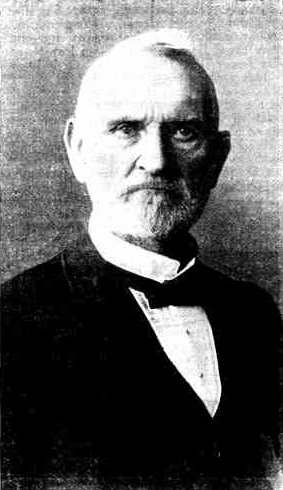

Mayor of Waterloo
- In office 17 February 1877 – 12 February 1879
- Preceded by: Thomas Lloyd Fusedale
- Succeeded by: Andrew Torning
- In office 10 February 1881 – 13 February 1883
- Preceded by: William Evans
- Succeeded by: Matthew Smith

Personal details
- Born: 1 January 1835 Blackfort, County Tipperary, Ireland
- Died: 2 September 1918 (aged 83) New South Wales, Australia
- Party: Protectionist Party

Patrick Hogan (1 January 1835 – 2 September 1918) was an Irish-born Australian politician.

He was born in Blackfort in County Tipperary to farmer Michael Hogan and Mary Fitzgerald. Educated locally, he migrated to New South Wales in 1861 and became a policeman. In 1863 he married Bridget Kelly, with whom he had six children. He worked as a commercial agent in the timber business, and was also an alderman and mayor at Waterloo. He was elected to the New South Wales Legislative Assembly in 1885 as the member for Richmond. He did not contest the 1887 election, but was returned in 1889 as the member for Macleay, representing the Protectionist Party. He transferred to Raleigh in 1894. He retired in 1895, although he did contest the 1898 election. Hogan died in 1918.

Civic offices
Preceded by Thomas Lloyd Fusedale	Mayor of Waterloo; 1877–1879	Succeeded by Andrew Torning
Preceded by William Evans	Mayor of Waterloo; 1881–1883	Succeeded by Matthew Smith
New South Wales Legislative Assembly
Preceded by Samuel Gray	Member for Richmond; 1885–1887; Served alongside: Thomas Ewing	Succeeded by Frederick Crouch
Preceded by Robert Smith	Member for Macleay; 1889–1894; Served alongside: Otho Dangar/Francis Clarke	Abolished
New seat	Member for Raleigh; 1894–1895	Succeeded by John McLaughlin
