= Electoral district of Richmond (New South Wales) =

Former state electoral district of New South Wales, Australia

Richmond (or The Richmond) was an electoral district for the Legislative Assembly in the Australian state of New South Wales from 1880 to 1913 in the Northern Rivers region and named after the Richmond River. It elected two members simultaneously between 1885 and 1889 and three members between 1889 and 1894, with voters casting a vote for each vacancy and the leading candidates being elected. In 1894, Lismore and Ballina were established and Richmond became a single-member electorate. Lismore was abolished in 1904 and recreated in 1913, replacing Richmond.

== Members for The Richmond ==
Single-member (1880–1885)
Member	Party	Term						
Charles Fawcett	None	1880–1882						
Samuel Gray	None	1882–1885						
Two members (1885–1889)
Member	Party	Term	Member	Party	Term			
Thomas Ewing	None	1885–1887	Patrick Hogan	None	1885–1887			
Thomas Ewing	Protectionist	1887–1889	Frederick Crouch	Protectionist	1887–1889			
Three members (1889–1894)
Member	Party	Term	Member	Party	Term	Member	Party	Term
Thomas Ewing	Protectionist	1889–1894	Bruce Nicoll	Protectionist	1889–1894	John Perry	Protectionist	1889–1894
Single-member (1894–1913)
Member	Party	Term						
Robert Pyers	Ind. Protectionist	1894–1895						
Robert Pyers	Protectionist	1895–1901						
Robert Pyers	Progressive	1901–1904						
John Perry	Progressive	1904–1907						
John Perry	Liberal Reform	1907–1913						

== Election results ==
1910 New South Wales state election: The Richmond
Party	Candidate	Votes	%	±%
Liberal Reform	John Perry	3,687	60.9	
Labour	William Gillies	2,366	39.1	
Total formal votes		6,053	97.2	
Informal votes		172	2.8	
Turnout		6,225	72.0	
Liberal Reform hold				
