= John Perry (1845–1922) =

Australian politician

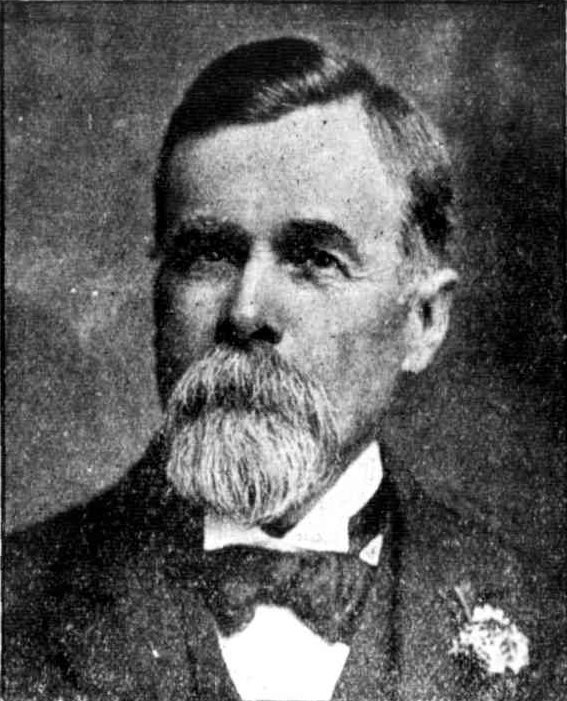

John Perry (13 July 1845 – 10 May 1922) was an Australian politician.

He was born in Sydney; his father, Julius Perry, was a bank clerk. He attended public schools at Surry Hills and Fort Street, and in 1861 began working for Watkins and Leigh, an importing firm. By the 1870s he was a sugar cane grower, also running a store at Alstonville. On 13 November 1870 he married Susan McAuslan Alston, with whom he had a son.

In 1889 he was elected to the New South Wales Legislative Assembly for Richmond, belonging to the Protectionist Party. He transferred to Ballina in 1894, back to Richmond in 1904, and to Byron in 1913. During that time he served as Minister of Public Instruction, Labour and Industry (1899–1904), Colonial Secretary (1904), Secretary for Mines (1907–1908) and (1908–1910). After the collapse of the Protectionists' successor, the Progressive Party, in 1904, he joined the Liberal Party, along with most of his remaining party colleagues. Perry retired in 1920 and died at Pittwater two years later, aged 76.

Parliament of New South Wales
Political offices
Preceded by James Hogue	Minister of Public Instruction; Minister for Labour and Industry; 1899 – 1904	Succeeded by John Fegan
Preceded by John See	Colonial Secretary; June – August 1904	Succeeded by Thomas Waddell
Preceded by Samuel Moore as Secretary for Mines and Agriculture	Secretary for Mines; October 1907 – January 1908	Succeeded by William Wood
New office	Minister for Agriculture; 1908 – 1910	Succeeded by Donald Macdonell
New South Wales Legislative Assembly
Preceded by Frederick Crouch; Thomas Ewing	Member for Richmond; 1889–1894; With: Ewing, Nicoll	Succeeded by Robert Pyers
New seat	Member for Ballina; 1894–1904	Abolished
Preceded by Robert Pyers	Member for Richmond; 1904–1913	Abolished
New seat	Member for Byron; 1913–1920	Succeeded by George Nesbitt; Stephen Perdriau; Tom Swiney
