= Otho Dangar =

Australian politician

Otho Orde Dangar (1 February 1842 – 20 September 1923) was an Australian politician.

He was born at Hastings River to storekeeper William Snowdon Dangar and Susan Freethey. On 15 October 1868 he married Elizabeth Garvin at Port Macquarie; they would have five children. A daughter was painter and potter Anne Dangar. He worked as a storekeeper and auctioneer. In 1889 Dangar was elected to the New South Wales Legislative Assembly as the Protectionist member for Macleay. He was re-elected at the 1891 election as an Independent Protectionist, in that he supported the Free Trade government of Sir Henry Parkes. He was forced to resign in 1893 due to financial difficulties, and he was defeated in the subsequent by-election. He made two more runs for parliament at the 1894 election, and 1901 election without success.

Dangar died at Balmain on 20 September 1923 (aged 81).

New South Wales Legislative Assembly
Preceded by Robert Smith	Member for Macleay; 1889–1893; Served alongside: Patrick Hogan	Succeeded by Francis Clarke
