= James Wilson (New South Wales politician, born 1862) =

Australian politician

James Wilson (1862 – 24 September 1925) was an English-born Australian politician.

== Early life ==
He was born at Redditch to labourer James Wilson and Martha Collins. He migrated to New South Wales around 1870 and worked as a confectioner.

== Political career ==
He was secretary of the Confectioners Employees Union and its delegate to the Trades and Labor Council, of which he was president in 1892. He was a foundation member of the Labor Party, and president of the Political Labor League from 1898 to 1899. He was a Labor member of the New South Wales Legislative Council from 1899 until his death in 1925.

== Later life and death ==
Around 1902 he married Lucy Anne Garnett, with whom he had a daughter. He was a Labor member of the New South Wales Legislative Council from 1899 until his death in 1925. He was reportedly a prominent Labor figure, "brilliant speaker" and sought-after campaigner in his earlier years, but suffered from ailing health and was "not prominent" later in his career, rarely attending the last session before his death. Wilson died in Sydney in 1925.
