= William Henry Piddington =

Australian politician

William Piddington MLA

Member of New South Wales Legislative Assembly
- In office 17 July 1894 – 27 September 1900
- Preceded by: Inaugural
- Succeeded by: Michael MacMahon
- Constituency: Electoral district of Uralla-Walcha

Personal details
- Born: 24 April 1856 Brisbane, Colony of New South Wales
- Died: 27 September 1900 (aged 44) Ashfield, New South Wales
- Party: Independent Free Trade; Free Trade; Protectionist
- Spouse: Florence Louise (née Bennett) 1881
- Relations: Brother; Albert Piddington
- Children: Five children
- Education: Newington College
- Occupation: Banker

William Henry Burgess Piddington (24 April 1856 – 27 September 1900) was an Australian politician and a member of the New South Wales Legislative Assembly for six years.

== Birth and education ==
Piddington was born in Brisbane, Colony of New South Wales and educated there and Newington College while the school was situated at Newington House on the Parramatta River. He was the first son of London-born William Jones Killick Piddington and his Tasmanian wife Annie, née Burgess. William Snr was a Methodist minister who in later life became an Anglican. Albert Piddington was a younger brother, and Ralph Piddington was his nephew.

== Banking and parliament ==
In 1872, Piddington commenced working for the Commercial Banking Company of Sydney and he was the branch manager in Walcha, New South Wales, when he won the local Legislative Assembly seat in 1894. He resigned from the Legislative Assembly on 23 May 1900 and was made bankrupt on his own petition 2 days later. He retained the seat at the resulting by-election.

== Death ==
He died from apoplexy while still a member of parliament and was survived by his wife and five children.

New South Wales Legislative Assembly
New district	Member for Uralla-Walcha; 1894 – 1900	Succeeded by Michael MacMahon
