= Michael MacMahon (politician) =

Australian politician

Michael John MacMahon (8 March 1854 – 11 July 1931) was an Australian politician.

He was born in Morpeth to Denis MacMahon and Bridget Cahill. Educated in Maitland, he established a local store at Urala, where he was an alderman (1882–1900) and mayor (1884, 1887, 1890–91, 1897–1900). On 7 September 1887 he married Martha Mary McCrossan, with whom he had five children. In 1900 he won a by-election for the New South Wales Legislative Assembly seat of Uralla-Walcha as a Protectionist. Re-elected in 1901, he was defeated in 1904 running for Armidale. In 1907 he was the Labor candidate for Armidale. MacMahon had moved to Sydney around 1903, and he died in 1931 in Sutherland.

New South Wales Legislative Assembly
Preceded by William Piddington	Member for Uralla-Walcha; 1900–1904	Abolished
