= Dick Meagher =

Australian politician

The Honourable Dick Meagher KCSG
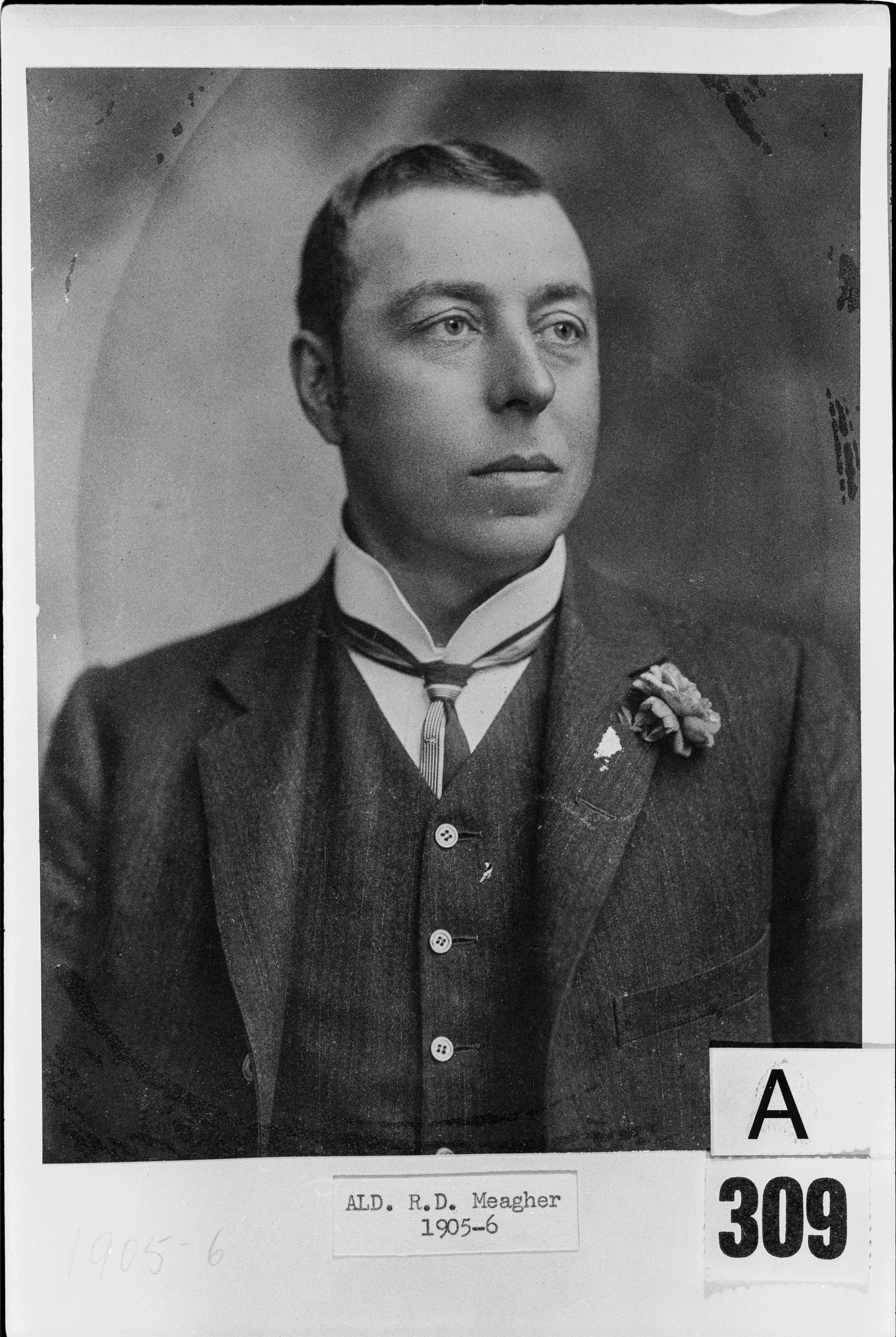
- Meagher circa 1905–1906

13th Speaker of the New South Wales Legislative Assembly
- In office 23 December 1913 – 16 April 1917
- Preceded by: Henry Morton
- Succeeded by: John Cohen

47th Lord Mayor of Sydney
- In office 1 January 1916 – 31 December 1917
- Preceded by: Richard Richards
- Succeeded by: James Joynton Smith

Alderman of the Sydney City Council
- In office 14 October 1901 – 1 December 1918
- Constituency: Phillip Ward
- In office 2 December 1918 – 30 November 1921
- Constituency: Flinders Ward

Member of the New South Wales Legislative Council
- In office 17 July 1917 – 23 February 1920
- Appointed by: Sir Gerald Strickland

Personal details
- Born: Richard Denis Meagher; 11 January 1866 Bathurst, Colony of New South Wales
- Died: 17 September 1931 (aged 65) Lewisham, New South Wales, Australia
- Party: Protectionist (1895); Independent (1895–1909); Labor (1909–1917); Independent (1917–1921)

Richard Denis Meagher KCSG (11 January 1866 – 17 September 1931) was an Australian solicitor and was the first Labor Lord Mayor of Sydney, serving from 1916 to 1917.

== Early life ==
Meagher was born in Bathurst, New South Wales and educated at St Stanislaus' College, Bathurst and St Aloysius' College, Sydney. He became an articled clerk to the solicitor J. A. B. Cahill in 1883 and Paddy Crick in 1887. In January 1891, he married Alice Maude Osmond. He became Crick's partner in 1892 and mainly practiced in the police court. Meagher unsuccessfully defended George Dean of attempted murder, but persuaded two out of three royal commissioners in a subsequent inquiry to find that the conviction was unsafe and, as a result, Dean was pardoned.

== Political career ==
On the strength of Meagher's defence of Dean, he was elected as the Protectionist member for Sydney-Phillip in the New South Wales Legislative Assembly in July 1895. However, on 18 July, Meagher had boasted to Julian Salomons that he had tricked Dean into admitting his guilt. Although Dean's confession to his lawyer was a matter of solicitor-client privilege, Salomons found himself compelled to pass on this information to the Attorney General, Jack Want. Rumours of Dean's confession began to circulate and in September, Want was questioned on it, but declined to comment. On 24 September, Dean petitioned Parliament to clear his name and next day Want read Salomons' account of Meagher's conversation to the House.

Although Meagher had vigorously denied the conversation in the House, chemist R. J. Smith admitted giving Dean arsenic. As a result, Dean, Meagher, Crick, Meagher's assistant, Daniel Green, and a witness, Jane Reynolds, were charged with conspiring to pervert the course of justice. On 8 October, Meagher confessed and resigned from Parliament, saying "I am determined to endure mental torture no longer, nor to stifle the voice of truth … This awful lesson of my life I will endeavour to atone for in another clime". Nevertheless, he spent the rest of his life in Sydney. Meagher was found guilty of conspiracy, but this conviction was quashed on appeal. He was struck off the roll of solicitors soon after, and supported himself from lectures and as a land agent.

Meagher was elected to represent the Tweed as an independent in 1898 and in September gained new fame by horsewhipping John Norton in Pitt Street for calling Meagher in Truth "Mendax Meagher" and the "premier perjurer of our public life and the champion criminal of the continent", causing Norton to attempt to shoot him. Meagher was fined £5 for assault. He held the Tweed until its abolition in 1904 and was an alderman on Sydney Municipal Council from 1901 to 1921 and was the first Labor Lord Mayor of Sydney. From 1907 to 1917 he returned to parliament as the member for Phillip and was Speaker from 1913 to 1917. He joined the Australian Labor Party in 1909 and was its vice-president in 1913 and 1915 to 1916 and president from 1914 to 1915. He was expelled from the party for supporting conscription in 1916. He was defeated as an independent labor candidate in 1917, but Premier William Holman appointed him to the New South Wales Legislative Council in May 1917.

Meagher failed to be readmitted as a solicitor in 1900, 1902 and 1904, but succeeded in 1909. Nevertheless, the Law Institute appealed to the High Court of Australia successfully against his readmission. He applied to be admitted again unsuccessfully in 1917 and 1919, and failed to gain leave for an appeal to the High Court in March 1920. In February, Meagher resigned from the Legislative Council to run unsuccessfully for the five-member seat of Sydney. Later that year, parliament passed a bill to reinstate Meagher as a solicitor.

Meagher's wife died in 1924. Richard Meagher died of nephritis in Lewisham Hospital in 1931 aged 65. Meagher was buried on 19 September 1931 at Waverley Cemetery

== Honours ==
Meagher was appointed a papal knight of the Order of St Gregory in 1928.

== Notes ==
- Pearl, Cyril (1958). Wild men of Sydney. W.H. Allen.

New South Wales Legislative Assembly
Preceded by Robert Fowler	Member for Sydney-Phillip; 1895	Succeeded by Henry Copeland
Preceded by Joseph Kelly	Member for Tweed; 1898–1904	District abolished
Preceded by Phillip Sullivan	Member for Phillip; 1907–1917	Succeeded by John Doyle
Preceded by John Cohen	Chairman of Committees; 1910–1913	Succeeded by Thomas Thrower
Preceded by Henry Morton	Speaker of the New South Wales Legislative Assembly; 1913–1917	Succeeded by John Cohen
Party political offices
Preceded by Ernest Farrar	President of the New South Wales Labor Party; 1914–1915	Succeeded by John Daniel FitzGerald
Civic offices
Preceded by Richard Richards	Lord Mayor of Sydney; 1916–1917	Succeeded by James Joynton Smith
