= Electoral district of Uralla-Walcha =

Former state electoral district of New South Wales, Australia

Uralla-Walcha was an electoral district of the Legislative Assembly in the Australian state of New South Wales, including the towns of Uralla and Walcha. It was originally created in 1894, when multi-member districts were abolished, and the three member district of New England was largely divided between Uralla-Walcha, Armidale and Bingara. The district was abolished in 1904 as a result of the 1903 New South Wales referendum, which reduced the number of members of the Legislative Assembly from 125 to 90, and was divided between Armidale and Bingara.

== Members for Uralla-Walcha ==
Member	Party	Period
William Piddington	Ind. Free Trade	1894–1895
William Piddington	Free Trade	1895–1898
William Piddington	National Federal	1898–1900
Michael MacMahon	Protectionist	1900–1901
Michael MacMahon	Progressive	1901–1904

== Election results ==
1901 New South Wales state election: Uralla-Walcha
Party	Candidate	Votes	%	±%
Progressive	Michael MacMahon	572	46.6	−8.8
Liberal Reform	Charles Marsh	549	44.7	+39.9
Independent	James Watts	103	8.4	
Independent	Frank Townshend	3	0.2	
Total formal votes		1,227	98.6	+0.4
Informal votes		17	1.4	−0.4
Turnout		1,244	68.1	+10.3
Progressive hold				
