= Hugh McKinnon (Australian politician) =

Australian politician

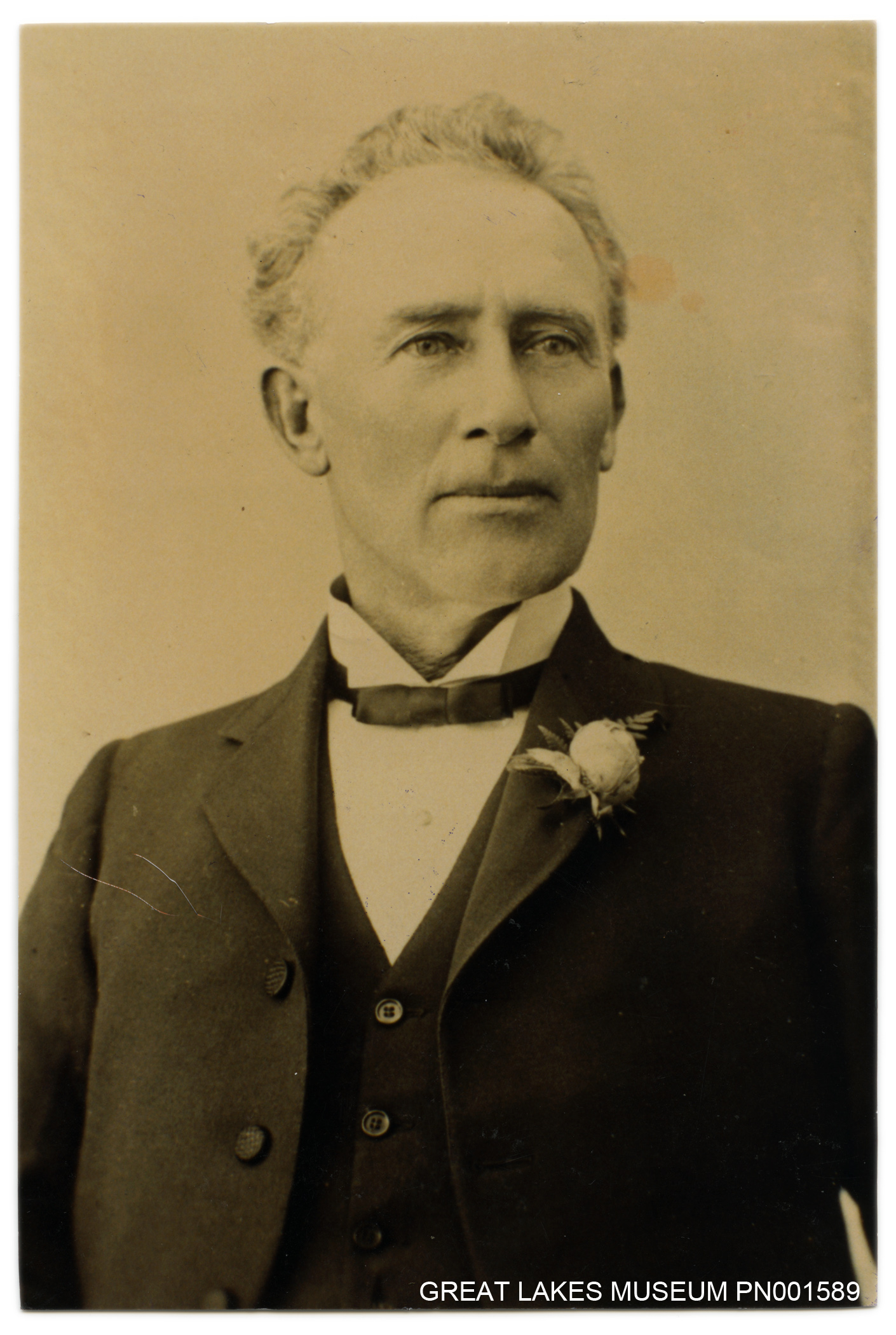

Hugh McKinnon (1856 – 6 March 1930) was an Australian politician.

Born in Taree, the son of Ann and Donald McKinnon a farmer, he attended local schools before becoming a teacher at Redbank Public School on the Manning River. He served on Manning Shire Council for twenty-two years. In 1891 he was elected to the New South Wales Legislative Assembly as the Protectionist member for Hastings and Manning, serving until 1894. McKinnon died at Taree in 1930.

New South Wales Legislative Assembly
Preceded by Walter Vivian	Member for Hastings and Manning; 1891–1894	Abolished
