= Electoral district of Sydney-Phillip =

Former state electoral district of New South Wales, Australia

Sydney-Phillip was an electoral district of the Legislative Assembly in the Australian state of New South Wales. It was located in central Sydney and named after Arthur Phillip. It was created in 1894 from part of South Sydney. It was in the area surrounding central railway station area, bounded by Liverpool Street in the north, Elizabeth Street in the east, Cleveland Street in the south, while the western boundary consisted of Newtown Road, George Street West and George Street. In 1904 it was largely replaced by Phillip.

== Members for Sydney-Phillip ==
Member	Party	Term
Robert Fowler	Free Trade	1894–1895
Dick Meagher	Protectionist	1895
Henry Copeland	Protectionist	1895–1900
Daniel O'Connor	Protectionist	1900–1901
Daniel O'Connor	Progressive	1901–1904

== Election results ==
1901 New South Wales state election: Sydney-Phillip
Party	Candidate	Votes	%	±%
Progressive	Daniel O'Connor	676	41.4	−16.1
Liberal Reform	John Moloney	514	31.5	−2.8
Labour	George Barnett	442	27.1	
Total formal votes		1,632	99.6	+0.3
Informal votes		6	0.4	−0.3
Turnout		1,638	54.1	+2.9
Progressive hold				
