= Electoral district of Manning =

Former state electoral district of New South Wales, Australia

Manning was an electoral district of the Legislative Assembly in the Australian state of New South Wales from 1894 to 1904, and from 1988 to 1991 in the Manning River area.

== Members for Manning ==
First incarnation (1894–1904)
Member	Party	Period
James Young	Free Trade	1894–1901
John Thomson	Progressive	1901–1904
Second incarnation (1988–1991)
Member	Party	Period
Wendy Machin	National	1988–1991

== Election results ==
1988 New South Wales state election: Manning
Party	Candidate	Votes	%	±%
National	Wendy Machin	23,735	73.9	+20.2
Labor	John Tuite	8,391	26.1	−9.1
Total formal votes		32,126	97.3	−0.5
Informal votes		896	2.7	+0.5
Turnout		33,022	95.0	
National notional hold		Swing	+12.4	
