= Francis Clarke (New South Wales politician) =

Australian politician (1857–1939)

The Honourable Francis Clarke
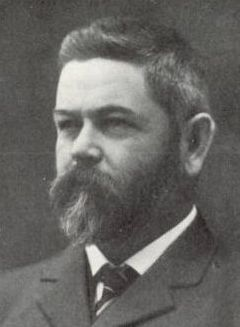

Member of the Australian Parliament for Cowper
- In office 29 March 1901 – 16 December 1903
- Preceded by: New seat
- Succeeded by: Henry Lee

Personal details
- Born: 25 March 1857 Stroud, Colony of New South Wales
- Died: 18 May 1939 (aged 82) Manly, New South Wales, Australia
- Party: Protectionist Party
- Occupation: Surveyor

Francis Clarke (25 March 1857 – 18 May 1939) was an Australian politician.

== Early life ==
Clarke was born on 25 March 1857 in Stroud, New South Wales. He was the son of Ellen (née Walsh) and Thomas Clarke.

Clarke attended St Stanislaus' College at Bathurst and subsequently undertook training in surveying, passing the examination to become a licensed surveyor in 1883. He worked for periods in Sydney and also at Bulga, Comboyne, Moree and on the North Coast. He served as president of the Institution of Surveyors, New South Wales, from 1897 to 1898.

== Political career ==
He was a member of the New South Wales Legislative Assembly from 1893 to 1898, winning the seat of Macleay as the Protectionist Party candidate at the 1893 by-election, but it was abolished the following year and replaced by Hastings and Macleay which he won, holding it in 1895 and 1898. Clarke played a role in expediting the re-inclusion of Edmund Barton in the Australasian Federal Convention for the establishment of the Australian Federation. Barton was a major driver in the Federation movement but as he lost his seat in the NSW Colonial parliament he faced exclusion from the discussions. To expedite his return to the political process Clarke resigned from his safe seat of Hastings and the Macleay triggering a by-election which Barton won with Clarke's endorsement.

Serving as an early alderman of the Borough of North Sydney, Clarke served a single term as mayor (1898–1899). He was later appointed a member of the New South Wales Legislative Council from 1899 to 1900, representing the Protectionist Party.

In 1901, he was elected to the Australian House of Representatives as the Protectionist member for Cowper. He held the seat until his defeat in 1903 by Henry Lee of the Free Trade Party.

== Later life ==
After leaving politics he was drafted as a member of the Royal Commission on Customs and Tariffs 1904-07 and the Royal Commission on Northern Territory railways and ports (1913–1914). On 21 December 1933 he was granted permission to retain the title "The Honourable" because he had been a member of the first federal parliament.

== Personal life ==
In 1885, Clarke married Mary McCarthy, with whom he had six children. He was widowed in 1903 and died at his home in Manly on 18 April 1939, aged 82. He was interred at Gore Hill Cemetery.

New South Wales Legislative Assembly
Preceded by Otho Dangar	Member for Macleay; 1893 – 1894; Served alongside: Hogan	District abolished
New district	Member for Hastings and Macleay; 1894 – 1898	Succeeded by Edmund Barton
Preceded by Edmund Barton	Member for Hastings and Macleay; 1900 – 1901	Succeeded by Robert Davidson
Civic offices
Preceded by John Purves	Mayor of North Sydney; 1898 – 1899	Succeeded by John Purves
Parliament of Australia
New parliament	Member for Cowper; 1901 – 1903	Succeeded by Henry Lee
