= Electoral district of Hastings and Macleay =

Former state electoral district of New South Wales, Australia

Hastings and Macleay was an electoral district of the Legislative Assembly in the Australian state of New South Wales from 1894 to 1920. It was created with the division of the two-member electorate of Hastings and Manning. In 1920 proportional representation was introduced and Hastings and Macleay was absorbed into the new four-member district of Oxley. The electorate was named after the Hastings and Macleay Rivers, the alluvial valleys of which contained most of its population.

== Members for Hastings and Macleay ==
Member	Party	Term
Francis Clarke	Protectionist	1894–1898
Edmund Barton	Protectionist	1898–1900
Francis Clarke	Protectionist	1900–1901
Robert Davidson	Liberal Reform	1901–1910
Henry Morton	Independent	1910–1917
Henry Morton	Nationalist	1917–1920

== Election results ==
1917 New South Wales state election: Hastings and Macleay
Party	Candidate	Votes	%	±%
Nationalist	Henry Morton	4,528	64.4	+64.4
Labor	Hercules Rowe	2,506	35.6	+35.6
Total formal votes		7,034	99.1	+0.7
Informal votes		63	0.9	−0.7
Turnout		7,097	61.4	−17.0
Member changed to Nationalist from Independent				
