= Electoral results for the district of Bourke =

Election result for Bourke, New South Wales, Australia

Bourke, an electoral district of the Legislative Assembly in the Australian state of New South Wales was created in 1880 and abolished in 1904.

Election	Member	Party				
1880	Russell Barton	None	Member	Party		
1882	Russell Barton	None	Richard Machattie	None		
1885	Russell Barton	None	William Sawers	None		
1887 (Note: While a by-election was held in 1887, parliament was dissolved before the writ was returned.)	Thomas Waddell	Free Trade	Alexander Wilson	Free Trade	Member	Party
1889	Thomas Waddell	Protectionist	William Willis	Protectionist	William Davis	Protectionist
1891	James Howe	Protectionist	William Willis	Protectionist	Hugh Langwell	Independent Labour
1891 by	Thomas Waddell	Protectionist	William Willis	Protectionist	Hugh Langwell	Independent Labour
1894	Edward Millen	Free Trade				
1895	Edward Millen	Free Trade				
1898	William Davis	National Federal				
1900 by	William Davis	Protectionist				
1901	William Davis	Progressive				

== Election results ==
=== Elections in the 1900s ===
==== 1901 ====
1901 New South Wales state election: Bourke
Party	Candidate	Votes	%	±%
Progressive	William Davis	unopposed		
Progressive hold				

==== 1900 by-election ====
1900 Bourke colonial by-election Thursday 6 September
Party	Candidate	Votes	%	±%
Protectionist	William Davis (re-elected)	unopposed		
Protectionist hold				

William Davis resigned due to bankruptcy.

=== Elections in the 1890s ===
==== 1898 ====
1898 New South Wales colonial election: Bourke
Party	Candidate	Votes	%	±%
National Federal	William Davis (elected)	526	50.4	
Free Trade	Edward Millen (defeated)	517	49.6	
Total formal votes		1,043	99.1	
Informal votes		10	1.0	
Turnout		1,053	45.8	
National Federal gain from Free Trade				

==== 1895 ====
1895 New South Wales colonial election: Bourke
Party	Candidate	Votes	%	±%
Free Trade	Edward Millen (elected)	517	63.5	
Protectionist	William Davis	297	36.5	
Total formal votes		814	98.9	
Informal votes		9	1.1	
Turnout		823	49.6	
Free Trade hold				

==== 1894 ====
1894 New South Wales colonial election: Bourke
Party	Candidate	Votes	%	±%
Free Trade	Edward Millen	469	42.3	
Independent Labour	Hugh Langwell (defeated)	358	32.3	
Protectionist	William Davis	282	25.4	
Total formal votes		1,109	98.7	
Informal votes		15	1.3	
Turnout		1,124	67.1	
Free Trade win		(previously 3 members)		

Bourke was reduced in size and parts were given to the new districts of Cobar and The Barwon. Hugh Langwell (Independent Labour) was one of the members for Bourke. Of the other two members, Thomas Waddell (Protectionist) successfully contested Cobar and William Willis (Protectionist) successfully contested The Barwon.

==== 1891 by-election ====
1891 Bourke by-election Saturday 10 November
Party	Candidate	Votes	%	±%
Protectionist	Thomas Waddell (elected)	1,337	55.4	
Labour	Donald Macdonell	1,077	44.6	
Total formal votes		2,414	99.0	
Informal votes		25	1.0	
Turnout		2,439	37.3	
Protectionist hold				

Peter Howe (Protectionist) resigned.

==== 1891 ====
1891 New South Wales colonial election: Bourke Friday 3 July
Party	Candidate	Votes	%	±%
Independent Labour	Hugh Langwell (elected 1)	2,089	23.9	
Protectionist	William Willis (re-elected 2)	1,886	21.6	
Protectionist	Peter Howe (elected 3)	1,725	19.7	
Protectionist	Thomas Waddell (defeated)	1,125	12.9	
Free Trade	Edward Millen	942	10.8	
Protectionist	William Davis (defeated)	869	10.0	
Protectionist	Austin O'Grady	102	1.2	
Total formal votes		8,738	99.1	
Informal votes		81	0.9	
Turnout		3,256	49.8	
Independent Labour gain 1 from Protectionist				
Protectionist hold 2				

=== Elections in the 1880s ===
==== 1889 ====
1889 New South Wales colonial election: Bourke Wednesday 13 February
Party	Candidate	Votes	%	±%
Protectionist	Thomas Waddell (elected 1)	1,510	27.4	
Protectionist	William Willis (elected 2)	1,198	21.8	
Protectionist	William Davis (elected 3)	1,102	20.0	
Free Trade	George Griffiths	842	15.3	
Protectionist	W Daniell	501	9.1	
Protectionist	Austin O'Grady	349	6.3	
Total formal votes		5,502	99.1	
Informal votes		52	0.9	
Turnout		2,058	37.5	
Protectionist gain 1 from Free Trade, win 1 and 1 member changed from Free Trade		(1 new seat)		

Thomas Waddell had been elected as a Free Trade member at the 1887 election however changed to the Protectionist party for this election.

==== 1887 ====
1887 New South Wales colonial election: Bourke Tuesday 22 February
Party	Candidate	Votes	%	±%
Free Trade	Thomas Waddell (elected 1)	1,220	38.7	
Free Trade	Alexander Wilson (elected 2)	996	31.6	
Protectionist	William Willis	934	29.7	
Total formal votes		3,150	99.3	
Informal votes		21	0.7	
Turnout		2,047	46.2	

==== 1887 by-election ====
1887 Bourke by-election Friday 21 January
Party	Candidate	Votes	%	±%
Free Trade	Thomas Waddell (elected 1)	1,019	40.2	
Protectionist	William Willis (elected 2)	833	32.9	
Free Trade	Alexander Wilson	682	26.9	
Total formal votes		2,534		
Informal votes				
Turnout		2,534	57.2 (Note: Estimate based on a roll of 4,431 at the election on 22 February.)	

Both the sitting members, Russell Barton and William Sawers, resigned. The writ was not returned as the Parliament was dissolved on 26 January.

==== 1885 ====
1885 New South Wales colonial election: Bourke Monday 26 October
Candidate	Votes	%
William Sawers (elected 1)	934	35.4
Russell Barton (re-elected 2)	750	28.4
Richard Machattie (defeated)	523	19.8
Austin O'Grady	435	16.5
Total formal votes	2,642	99.0
Informal votes	27	1.0
Turnout	1,703	43.8

==== 1882 ====
1882 New South Wales colonial election: Bourke Tuesday 19 December
Candidate	Votes	%
Russell Barton (re-elected 1)	573	44.2
Richard Machattie (elected 2)	395	30.5
Thomas Matthews	329	25.4
Total formal votes	1,297	98.0
Informal votes	26	2.0
Turnout	1,323	17.0
	(1 new seat)	

==== 1880 ====
1880 New South Wales colonial election: Bourke Tuesday 30 November
Candidate	Votes	%
Russell Barton (elected)	738	56.6
Joseph Olliffe	566	43.4
Total formal votes	1,304	98.0
Informal votes	27	2.0
Turnout	1,331	35.5
	(new seat)	

Joseph Olliffe had already unsuccessfully contested East Sydney.
