= 1887 Bourke colonial by-election =

By-election in New South Wales, Australia

A by-election was held for the New South Wales Legislative Assembly electorate of Bourke on 21 January 1887 because of the resignation of both the sitting members, Russell Barton, and William Sawers. The writ however was not returned as Parliament was dissolved on 26 January 1887.

== Dates ==
| Date | Event |
|---|---|
| 2 December 1886 | Russell Barton, and William Sawers resigned. |
| 29 December 1886 | Writ of election issued by the Speaker of the Legislative Assembly. |
| 11 January 1887 | Nominations |
| 21 January 1887 | Polling day |
| 26 January 1887 | Parliament dissolved |
| 1 February 1887 | Writ due to be returned |

== Result ==
1887 Bourke by-election Friday 21 January
| Party | Candidate | Votes | % | ±% |
|---|---|---|---|---|
| Free Trade | Thomas Waddell (elected 1) | 1,019 | 40.2 | |
| Protectionist | William Willis (elected 2) | 833 | 32.9 | |
| Free Trade | Alexander Wilson | 682 | 26.9 | |
| Total formal votes | | 2,534 | | |
| Informal votes | | | | |
| Turnout | | 2,534 | 57.2 (Note: Estimate based on a roll of 4,431 at the election on 22 February.) | |

Both the sitting members, Russell Barton and William Sawers, resigned. The writ was not returned as the Parliament was dissolved on 26 January.

== Aftermath ==
The same 3 candidates contested the election on 22 February. Waddell still headed the poll however Wilson was able to gather enough votes to take the second seat over Willis.

== See also ==
- Electoral results for the district of Bourke
- List of New South Wales state by-elections
