= 1891 Bourke colonial by-election =

By-election in New South Wales, Australia

A by-election was held for the New South Wales Legislative Assembly electorate of Bourke on 4 December 1891 because of the resignation of Peter Howe (Protectionist), which was given to the Speaker of the Legislative Assembly after he had been convicted of conspiracy to defraud.

== Dates ==
Date	Event
8 October 1891	Peter Howe charged with conspiracy to defraud.
21 October 1891	Peter Howe gave his resignation to William Willis, to be given to the Speaker if he was convicted.
31 October 1891	Peter Howe was convicted of one count of conspiracy to defraud.
6 November 1891	Writ of election issued by the Speaker of the Legislative Assembly.
20 November 1891	Nominations
4 December 1891	Polling day
18 December 1891	Return of writ

== Result ==
1891 Bourke by-election Saturday 10 November
Party	Candidate	Votes	%	±%
Protectionist	Thomas Waddell (elected)	1,337	55.4	
Labour	Donald Macdonell	1,077	44.6	
Total formal votes		2,414	99.0	
Informal votes		25	1.0	
Turnout		2,439	37.3	
Protectionist hold				

== See also ==
- Electoral results for the district of Bourke
- List of New South Wales state by-elections
