= 1900 Bourke colonial by-election =

Election result for Bourke, New South Wales, Australia

A by-election for the seat of Bourke in the New South Wales Legislative Assembly was held on 6 September 1900 because of the resignation of William Davis (Protectionist), having been made bankrupt the previous day.

== Dates ==
Date	Event
27 August 1900	William Davis was made bankrupt.
28 August 1900	William Davis resigned.
29 August 1900	Writ of election issued by the Speaker of the Legislative Assembly.
6 September 1900	Day of nomination
15 September 1900	Polling day
29 September 1900	Return of writ

== Result ==
1900 Bourke colonial by-election Thursday 6 September
Party	Candidate	Votes	%	±%
Protectionist	William Davis (re-elected)	unopposed		
Protectionist hold				

== See also ==
- Electoral results for the district of Bourke
- List of New South Wales state by-elections
