= Bathurst Street Lamps =

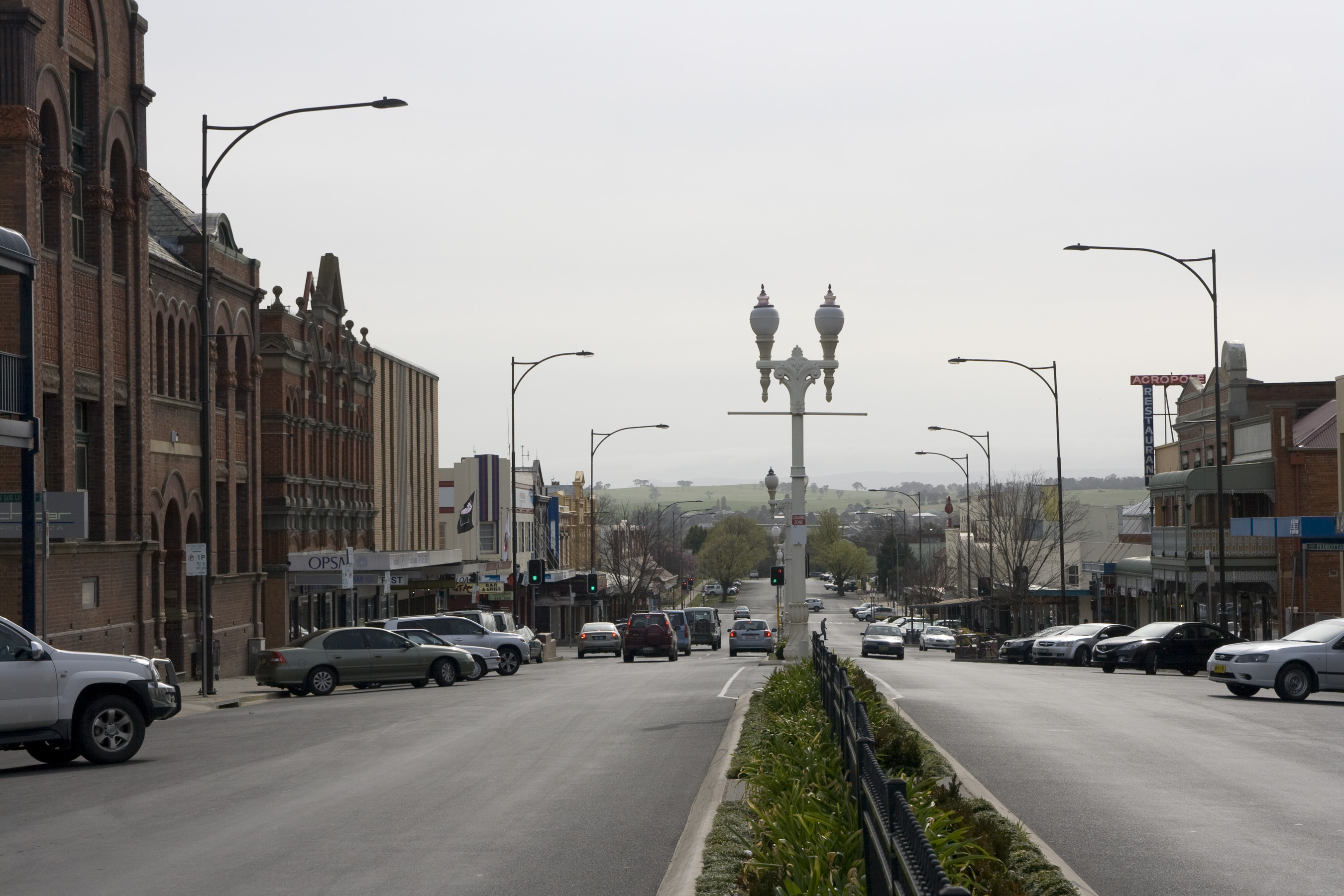
- Street lamps located in William Street, Bathurst, pictured in 2010

- Location within New South Wales Location within Australia
- 33°24′59″S 149°34′51″E
- Location: Howick Street, Bathurst, Bathurst Region, New South Wales, Australia

History
- Built: 1872–1924

Site notes
- Owner: Bathurst Regional Council

New South Wales Heritage Register
- Official name: Bathurst Street Lamps
- Type: State heritage (landscape)
- Designated: 1 August 2003
- Reference no.: 1666
- Type: Other – Urban Area
- Category: Urban Area
- Builders: Not known

The Bathurst Street Lamps are heritage-listed street lights located in the central business district of Bathurst in New South Wales, Australia. They were built from 1872 to 1924. They were added to the New South Wales State Heritage Register on 1 August 2003. There are 105 lights in total that are located on Howick, William, George, Keppel, Russell, and Church Streets, in King's Parade, and in Machattie Park.

== History ==
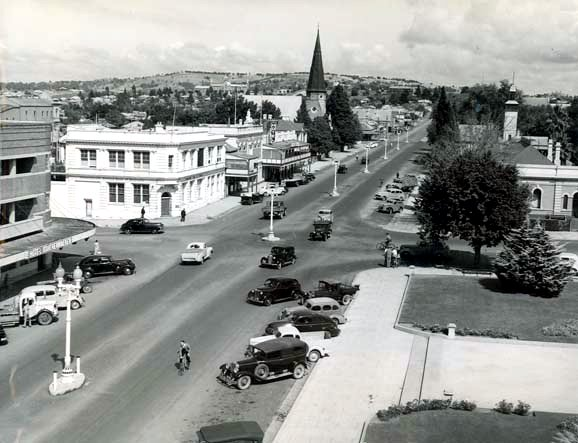
Overhead view of street lamps on William Street and the junction with Russell Street, with the King's Parade at right, undated. Traffic lights are now located at this intersection.

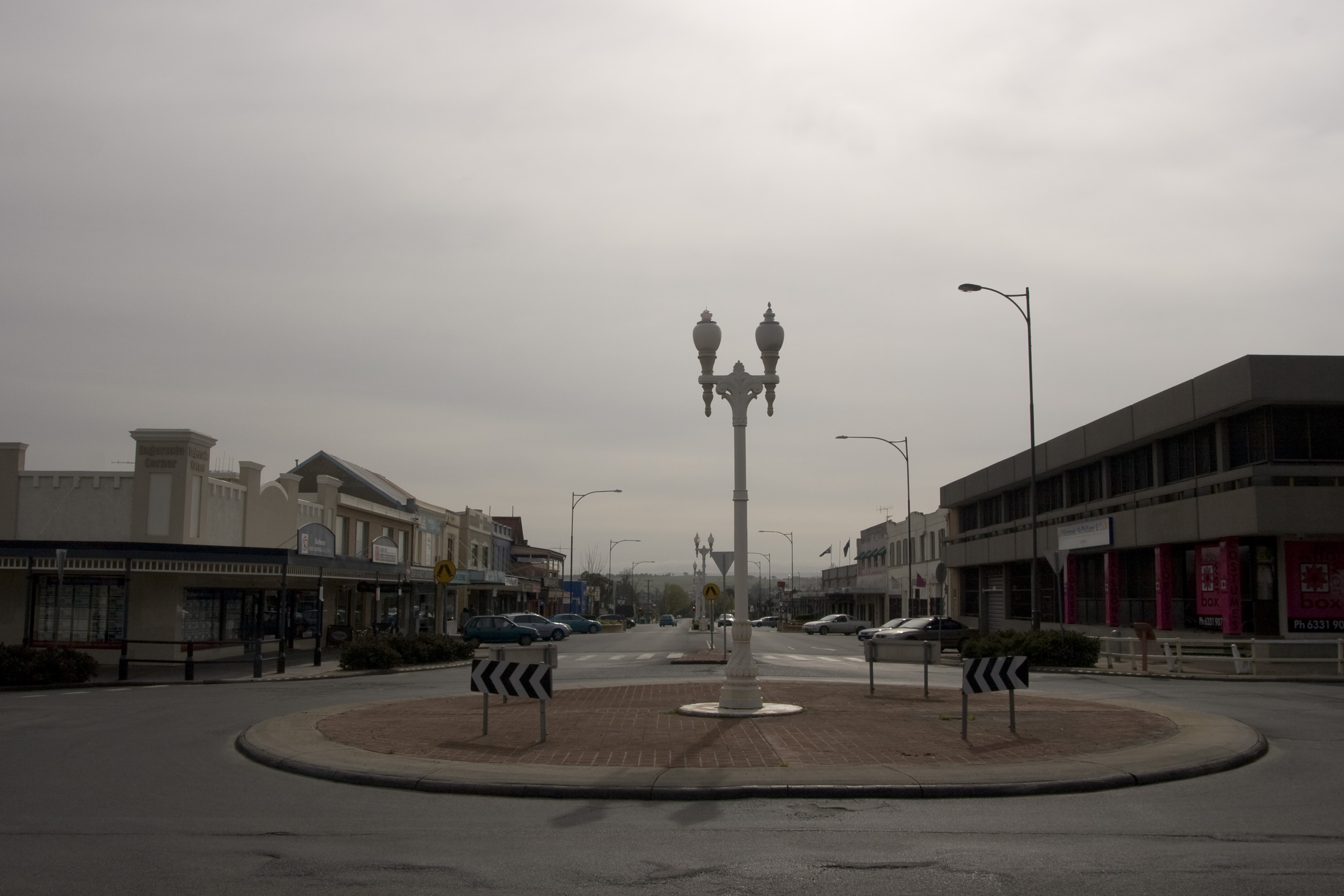
A street lamp located on the junction of Howick and George Streets, with further lamps looking north down George Street, 2010.

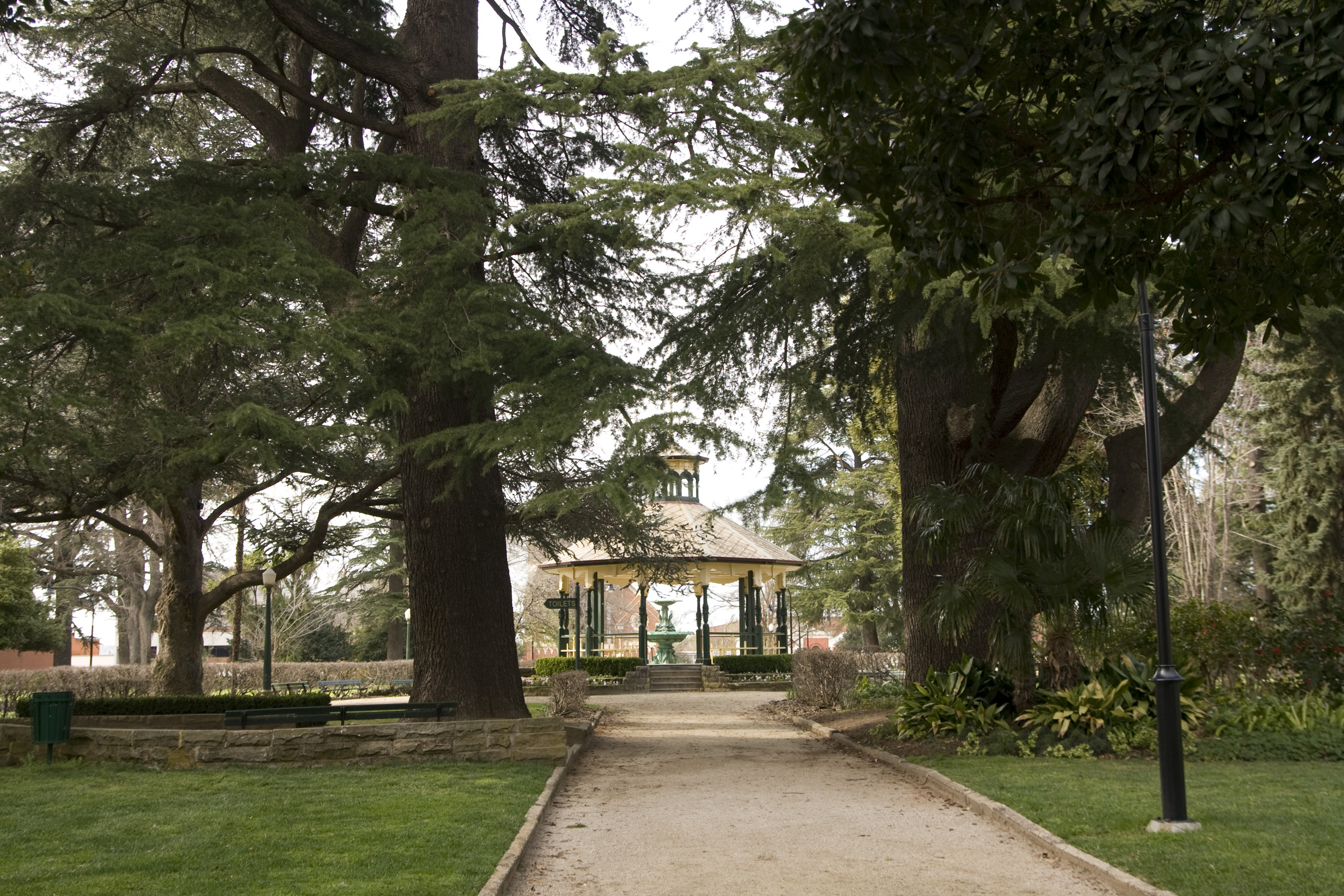
An older style street lamp located in Machattie Park, painted green and situated to the left of the rotunda between the large trees, 2010.

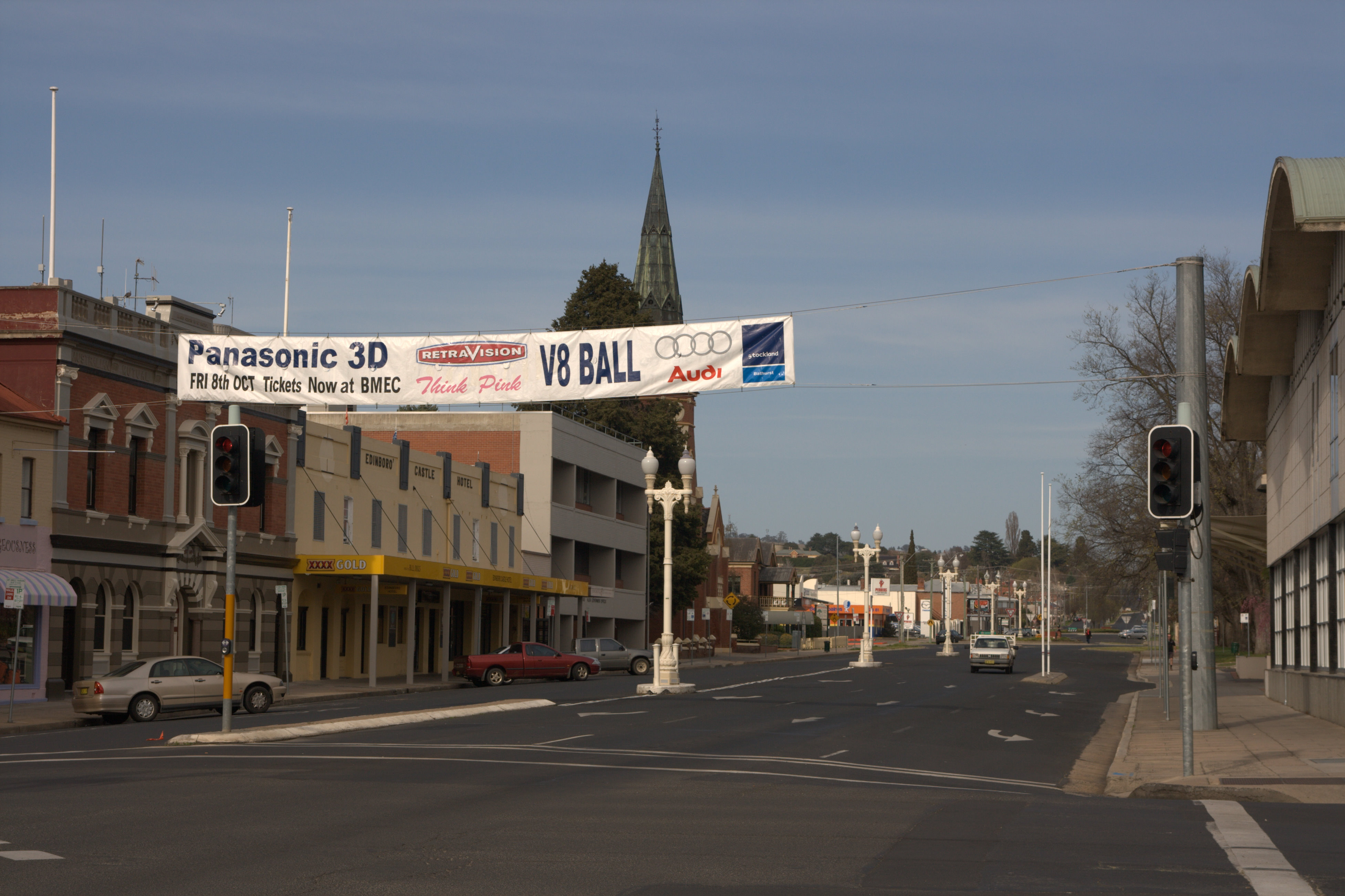
Street lamps in William Street, looking south, 2010.

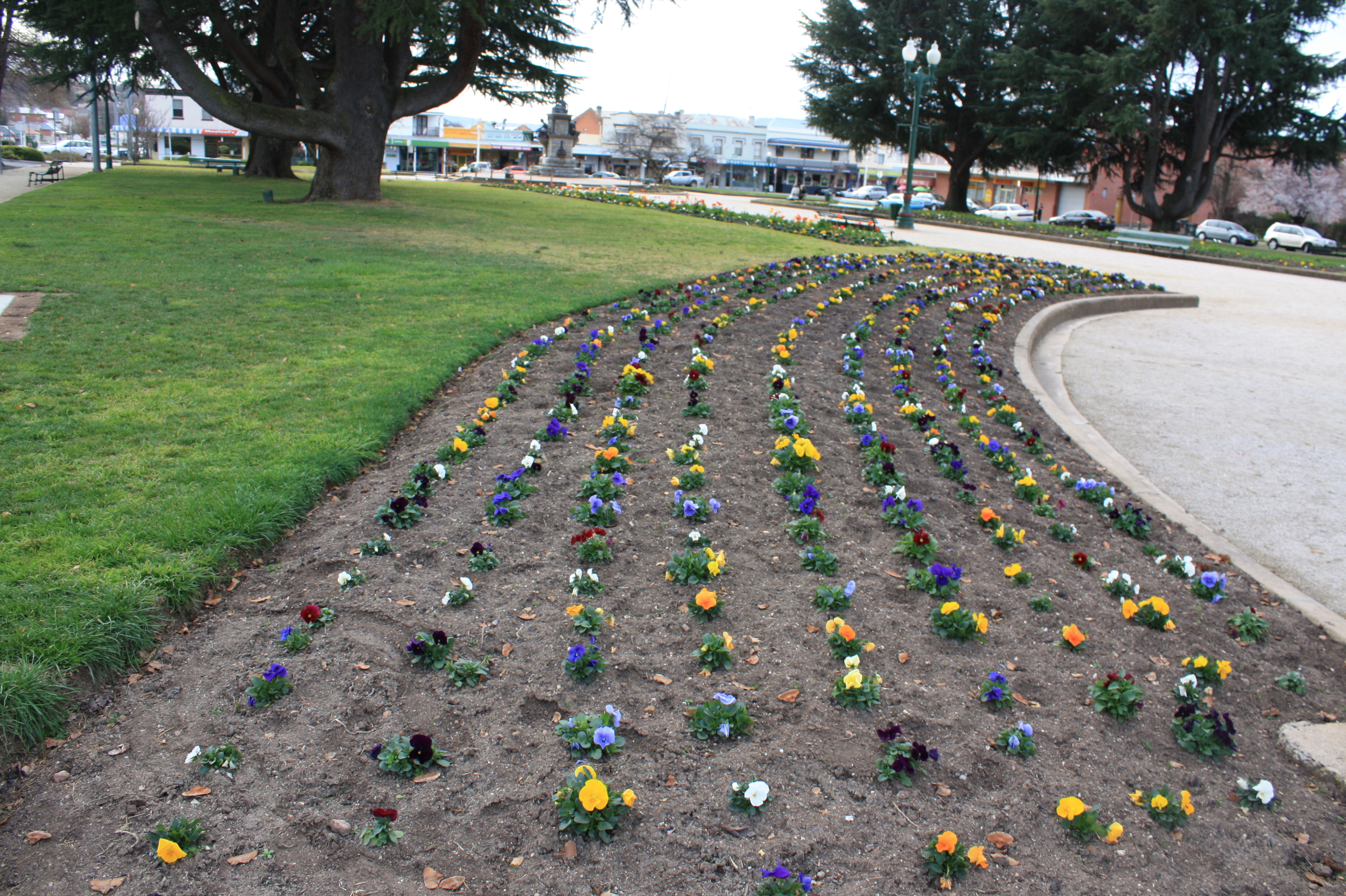
A street lamp located in King's Parade, in 2009.

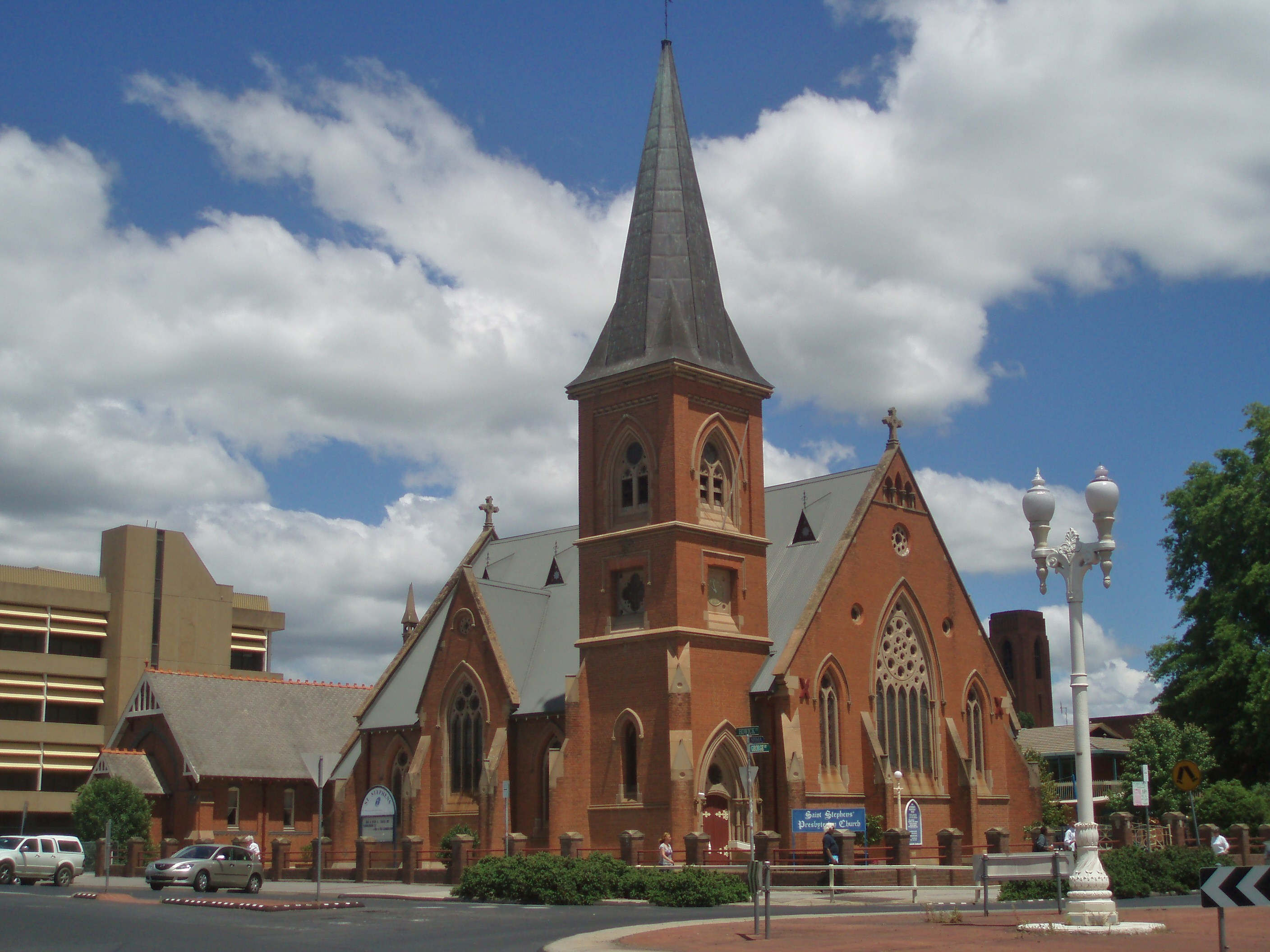
A street lamp located at the corner of George and Howick Streets, in 2010.

At the end of 1863 Bathurst Council made the first attempts to light the streets and an order was placed with George Fish, a local engineer, to provide six iron lamps. In January 1864 tenders were called for the supply of kerosene street lamps. They were required to be lit between sunset and sunrise 240 days of the year. Gas was first supplied to Bathurst consumers in 1872 by J. N. Wark's company and his potential biggest client was the Bathurst City Council. The existing paraffin lamps were converted to gas, and soon after two lamps were erected at each of the intersections of George, William with Durham, Howick, Russell and Keppel Streets within the central business district. A special levy of three pence in the pound was placed on property owners in the areas to pay for it. This levy needed special legislation to be enacted. The lights required much maintenance and were often subject to vandalism and the cost of extending mains and repairs to roads afterwards was high. By 1877 Bathurst had 55 street lights. The street lamp standards were removed and replaced with the current style of lamp standard following the introduction of electricity to the city in 1924.

A special lamp standard and horse fountain was installed in 1887 in Machattie Park as a memorial to the Lady Mayoress M. L. Machattie who headed a ladies committee that made a significant contribution to the Machattie Park project. She was married to Dr T. A. Machattie, the son of Machattie Park's namesake, Dr Richard Machattie. It was erected by the "Women and Girls of Bathurst".

Bathurst City Council took over ownership of all the historic lamp standards in the Bathurst CBD from Advance Energy (previously Southern Mitchell County Council) in 1998.

== Description ==
There are 105 lamps in total. They include:

- 49 twin light lamp standards that line the centre of Howick, William, George and Keppel Streets.
- 2 twin light lamp standards in King's Parade
- 53 single light lamp standards located within King's Parade, Machattie Park and line the centre of Russell and Church Streets.
- M.L. Machattie: lamp/horse trough fountain – On the corner of George and Keppel Streets is a large dish-style drinking fountain set on four cast iron hoofed legs. It is surmounted by a five-branched light on top of a tall column . Originally this lamp had a single gas lamp. A plaque halfway up the column reads "1887 Jubilee fountain erected by the Women and Girls of Bathurst, M.L. T. A Machattie, Mayoress".

The Machattie Park lamps are generally older than the others and include a central single globe reminiscent of the original gas light fittings.

The street lamp posts were reported to be generally in fair condition as at 3 October 2002; however, most were in need of re-painting and some were in need of cleaning. Corrosion was also occurring at the base of some. Signage that is connected directly to the lamp posts should be removed.

The M. L. Machattie lamp/horse trough and drinking fountain is in poor condition and the water fountain (bowl) is corroded and in need of treatment for corrosion and painting. Above, the lamps are in good condition.

The Machattie Park and King's Parade lamp posts are generally in fair condition; however, some have a slight lean while others are in need of paint and some in need of cleaning. Corrosion is also at the base of some.

While in need of repair and maintenance, the Bathurst street lamps are highly intact.

== Heritage listing ==
The Bathurst street and park lamp standards (105 in total) are a major element of nineteenth and early twentieth century street furniture that contributes to the distinctive historical character of the central civic and business areas of Bathurst. They are situated in Bathurst's central parks, Machattie and King's Parade and line the centre of six main streets. Installed between 1872 and 1924 when electricity replaced gas, the lamp posts are unusual in design, incorporating Victorian bases and Art Deco elements. The lamps posts are intact and in generally good condition. Comprising a large group of street lamps, they form a distinctive civic landmark in Bathurst and are rare in New South Wales.

Bathurst Street Lamps were listed on the New South Wales State Heritage Register on 1 August 2003 having satisfied the following criteria.

The place is important in demonstrating the course, or pattern, of cultural or natural history in New South Wales.

The Bathurst street lamps, as a group, are of state significance as a large and rare collection of street and park lamps. They demonstrate the civic development of Bathurst in the late nineteenth and early twentieth centuries and the city's conversion from gas to electricity. They make an important addition to Bathurst's historical identity.

The place has a strong or special association with a person, or group of persons, of importance of cultural or natural history of New South Wales's history.

The Bathurst street lamps have local associations with the civic works programs of the Bathurst City Council in providing local services and amenities. They are a visual demonstration of the local council's work in developing the Bathurst region.

The M. L. Machattie lamp/horse trough and fountain has local associations with the Lady Mayoress M L Machattie. It was erected to commemorate her contribution to the civic life of Bathurst and demonstrates the esteem in which she was held by the female community of Bathurst.

The place is important in demonstrating aesthetic characteristics and/or a high degree of creative or technical achievement in New South Wales.

The Bathurst street lamps are of state significance as aesthetically significant civic structures. They form a large, highly intact group of early electric street lamps.

Made of cast iron, the lamps are distinctive in combining Victorian bases with Art Deco elements. They are unusual in incorporating twin globes on a single standard base. Their design displays both the functional and decorative aspects of gas and early electric street lighting. They make a highly visible and valued contribution to the central Bathurst streetscape.

The Bathurst street lamps are landmarks in Bathurst and make an important contribution to the city's strong sense of historical and civic identity.

The place has a strong or special association with a particular community or cultural group in New South Wales for social, cultural or spiritual reasons.

The Bathurst street lamps are aesthetically distinctive and valued by the local community as historic civic structures. This is demonstrated by their inclusion in the Bathurst Heritage Study, the William and George Main Street Study and their listing on the Register of the National Estate as part of the Central Bathurst Conservation Area.

The place has potential to yield information that will contribute to an understanding of the cultural or natural history of New South Wales.

The Bathurst street lamps are of state significance for their research potential. They have potential to reveal further information on early twentieth century gas and electric lighting design and technology.

They are unlikely to display any archaeological potential due to the previous disturbance of the streets and public gardens.

The place possesses uncommon, rare or endangered aspects of the cultural or natural history of New South Wales.

As a group of over 100 lamps, the Bathurst street lamps are a large, rare and intact collection of civic street lamps, dating from the early twentieth century and demonstrating the conversion from gas to electric lighting.

The place is important in demonstrating the principal characteristics of a class of cultural or natural places/environments in New South Wales.

The Bathurst street lamps are representative of street lighting design and technology from the early twentieth century. However, their high quality, streetscape prominence and large number make them rare in New South Wales.
