= Gregor McGregor =

Australian politician

The Honourable Gregor McGregor
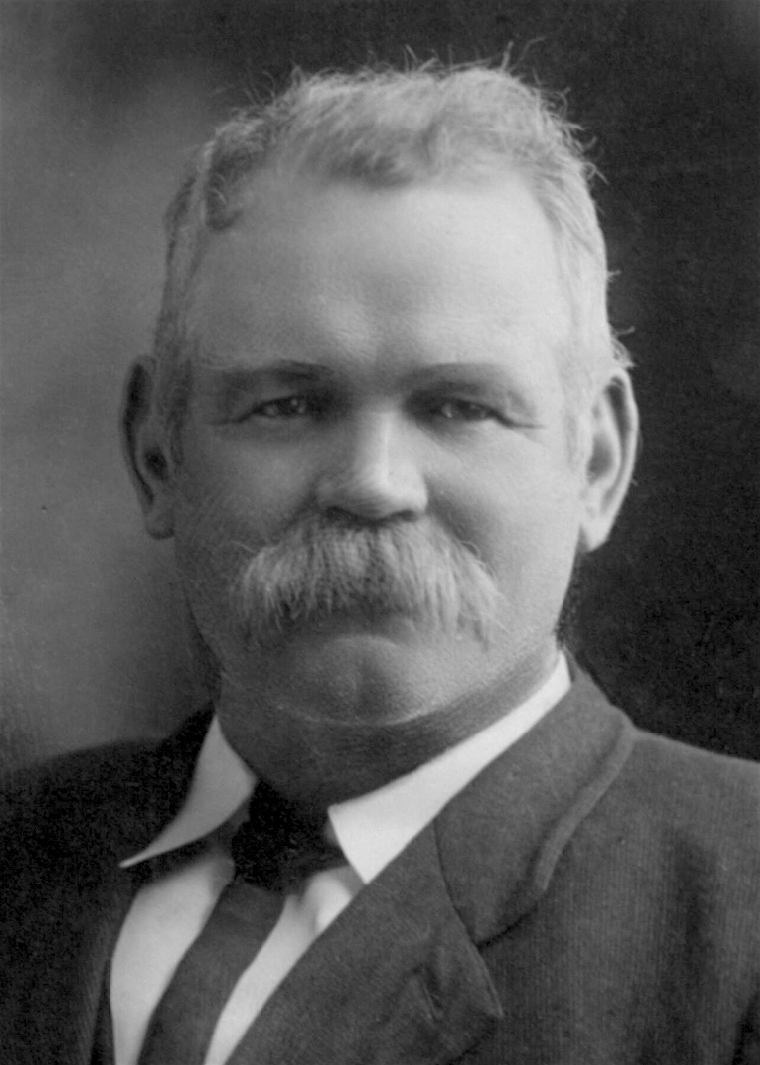

Deputy Leader of the Labor Party
- In office 20 May 1901 – 30 July 1914
- Leader: Chris Watson; Andrew Fisher
- Preceded by: party established
- Succeeded by: Billy Hughes

Leader of the Government in the Senate
- In office 29 April 1910 – 24 June 1913
- Preceded by: Edward Millen
- Succeeded by: Edward Millen
- In office 13 November 1908 – 2 June 1909
- Preceded by: Robert Best
- Succeeded by: Edward Millen
- In office 27 April 1904 – 18 August 1904
- Preceded by: Tom Playford II
- Succeeded by: Josiah Symon

Leader of the Opposition in the Senate
- In office 24 June 1913 – 13 August 1914
- Preceded by: Edward Millen
- Succeeded by: Edward Millen
- In office 2 June 1909 – 29 April 1910
- Preceded by: Edward Millen
- Succeeded by: Edward Millen
- In office 18 August 1904 – 5 July 1905
- Preceded by: Josiah Symon
- Succeeded by: Josiah Symon

Senator for South Australia
- In office 30 March 1901 – 13 August 1914
- Succeeded by: John Shannon

Member of the Member of the South Australian Legislative Council
- In office 19 May 1894 – 8 May 1901

Personal details
- Born: 18 October 1848 Kilmun, Argyll, Scotland
- Died: 13 August 1914 (aged 65) Unley, South Australia, Australia
- Resting place: West Terrace Cemetery
- Party: Labor
- Spouses: Julia Steggall (m. 1880; died 1880) Sarah Brock (m. 1882)
- Occupation: Trade unionist Politician

Gregor McGregor (18 October 1848 – 13 August 1914) was an Australian politician who served as a Senator for South Australia from 1901 until his death in 1914, representing the Labor Party. He was the party's inaugural Senate leader, and served three terms as Leader of the Government in the Senate.

== Early life ==
McGregor was born on 18 October 1848 in Kilmun, Argyll, Scotland. He was the son of Jane and Malcolm McGregor. His father was a gardener, and in 1854 the family moved to County Tyrone, Ireland, where he became the chief gardener to Sir Gerald Aylmer (one of the Aylmer baronets). McGregor left school at a young age to join his father. He later spent two years working as an agricultural labourer in England, and then returned to Scotland to work in the Glasgow shipyards.

In 1877, McGregor immigrated to South Australia. He initially worked as an agricultural labourer, and for a period he was employed by Richard Baker, one of his future Senate colleagues. In 1885, McGregor moved to Victoria and found work as a stonemason. He returned to South Australia in 1891 and continued working in the construction industry. He was active in the United Builders' Labourers Society, and in 1892 was elected to the United Trades and Labour Council of South Australia. He also became a justice of the peace.

== Early political involvement ==
In 1893, McGregor became president of the United Political Labor League, a forerunner of the modern Labor Party. He was elected to the South Australian Legislative Council the following year, becoming one of the first members of his party in any Australian parliament. In the Legislative Council, McGregor advocated for new workers' rights, but was also known for his opposition to South Australian involvement in the Boer War and as "a fervent protectionist who espoused the sanctity of White Australia".

== Senate ==
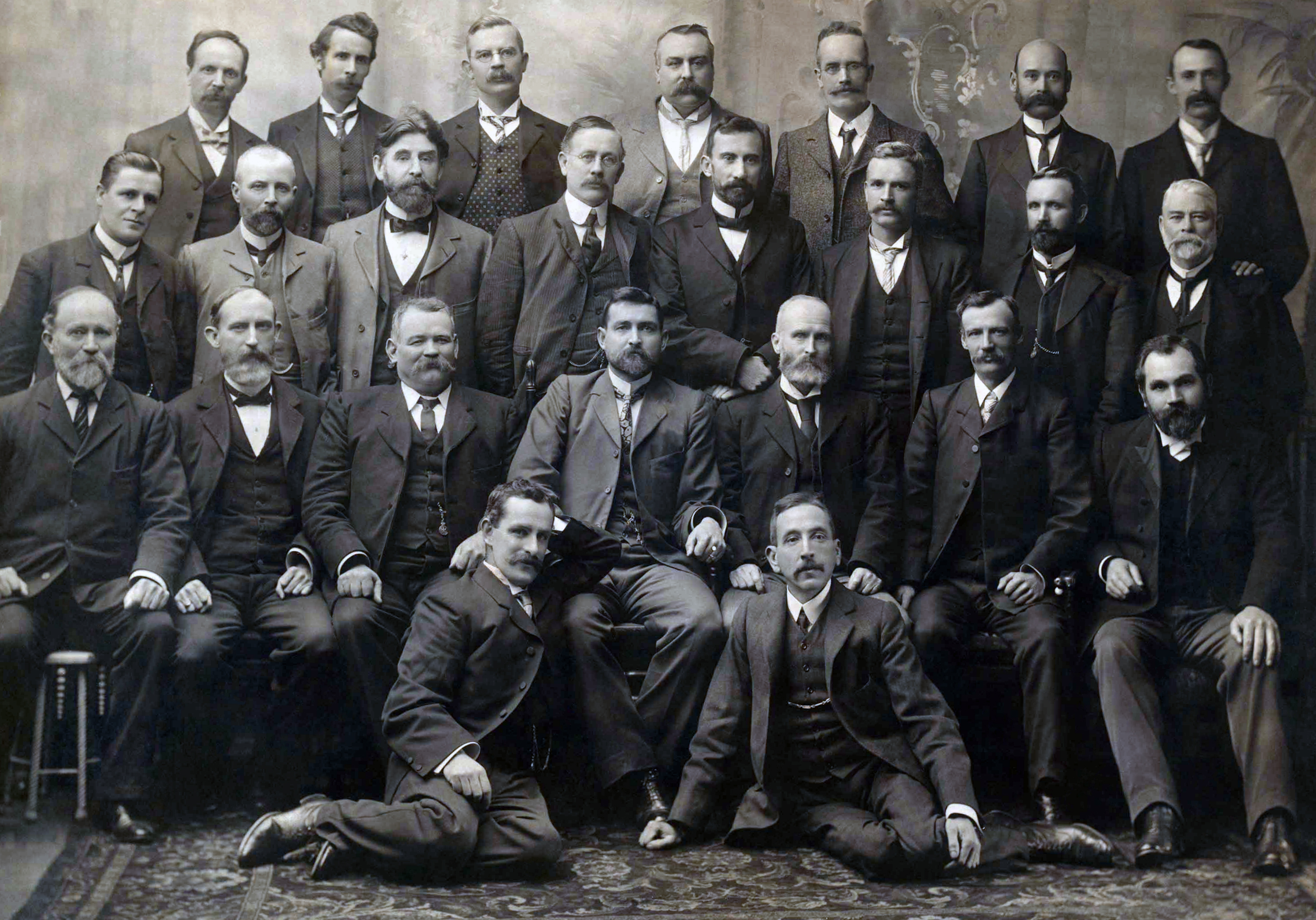
Group photograph of all Labor MPs elected at the inaugural 1901 election, including future prime ministers Chris Watson, Andrew Fisher, and Billy Hughes. McGregor is seated in a chair at front, third from left.

At the inaugural 1901 federal election, McGregor was elected to the Senate as one of six South Australian senators, and the only one from the Labor Party. He was the final senator to be elected, recording only 644 more votes than his nearest opponent, Andrew Kirkpatrick. However, when he was re-elected in 1903 and 1910 he topped the poll, winning more votes than any other South Australian candidate.

When the Labor caucus met for the first time after the 1901 election, McGregor was elected as the party's inaugural Senate leader. His party held the balance of power, and he soon told the Senate that "we are for sale". Chris Watson, Labor's first leader, described McGregor as "a powerful force in our party because of his political sagacity and perfect loyalty". Hugh Mahon said "his memory was phenomenal, his imagination rich and vivid". McGregor was Leader of the Government in the Senate and Vice-President of the Executive Council in each of the first three Labor governments – the short-lived Watson government of 1904 and Andrew Fisher's first two governments (1908 to 1909 and 1910 to 1913). As Leader of the Opposition in the Senate from 1913 to 1914, McGregor had an unusual level of influence due to his party holding a majority in the Senate.

In mid-1914, McGregor took leave from parliament due to ill health. He died from a heart condition on 13 August, at his home in Unley. His death came during the 1914 election campaign, and after he had already nominated himself as a candidate. He was given a state funeral and buried at West Terrace Cemetery.

== Personal life ==
McGregor married twice but had no children. His first wife, Julia Anna Steggall, died only a few months after their marriage in 1880. He remarried in 1882 to Sarah Ann Brock (née Ritchie), who was a widow.

McGregor was virtually blind by the time of his death. He experienced a gradual deterioration in his vision, which he attributed to an accident he had shortly after arriving in Australia. By the time he took his seat in the Senate, he could only read in the best lighting conditions, and eventually not at all. He compensated for his blindness with a memory described as "astounding", able to recite lengthy passages perfectly after hearing them read out loud, usually by his mother-in law.

== See also ==
- Hundred of McGregor

Political offices
Preceded by Thomas Playford	Vice-President of the Executive Council; 1904	Succeeded by James Drake
Preceded by Robert Best	Vice-President of the Executive Council; 1908–1909	Succeeded by Edward Millen
Preceded by Edward Millen	Vice-President of the Executive Council; 1910–1913	Succeeded by James McColl
Party political offices
New title	Leader of the Labor Party in the Senate; 1901–1914	Succeeded by George Pearce
