= Alexander Wilson (New South Wales politician) =

Australian politician

Alexander Wilson (c. 1849 – 3 December 1927) was an Irish-born Australian politician.

He was born in County Antrim to William Watson and Jane Smyth. He attended the Royal Academical Institution of Belfast before arriving in New South Wales in 1865; he became a pastoralist. In 1880 he was elected to the New South Wales Legislative Assembly for Murray; he was defeated in 1885, but returned as the member for Bourke in 1887. He did not contest the 1889 election, but did run unsuccessfully for Randwick in 1895 and Sydney-King in 1901. Wilson died at Lewisham in 1927.

New South Wales Legislative Assembly
Preceded by Robert Barbour	Member for Murray; 1880–1885; Served alongside: William Hay/Robert Barbour	Succeeded by John Chanter
Preceded by Russell Barton; William Sawers	Member for Bourke; 1887–1889; Served alongside: Thomas Waddell	Succeeded by William Davis; William Willis
