= George Pearce =

Australian politician (1870–1952)

The Right Honourable Sir George Pearce KCVO
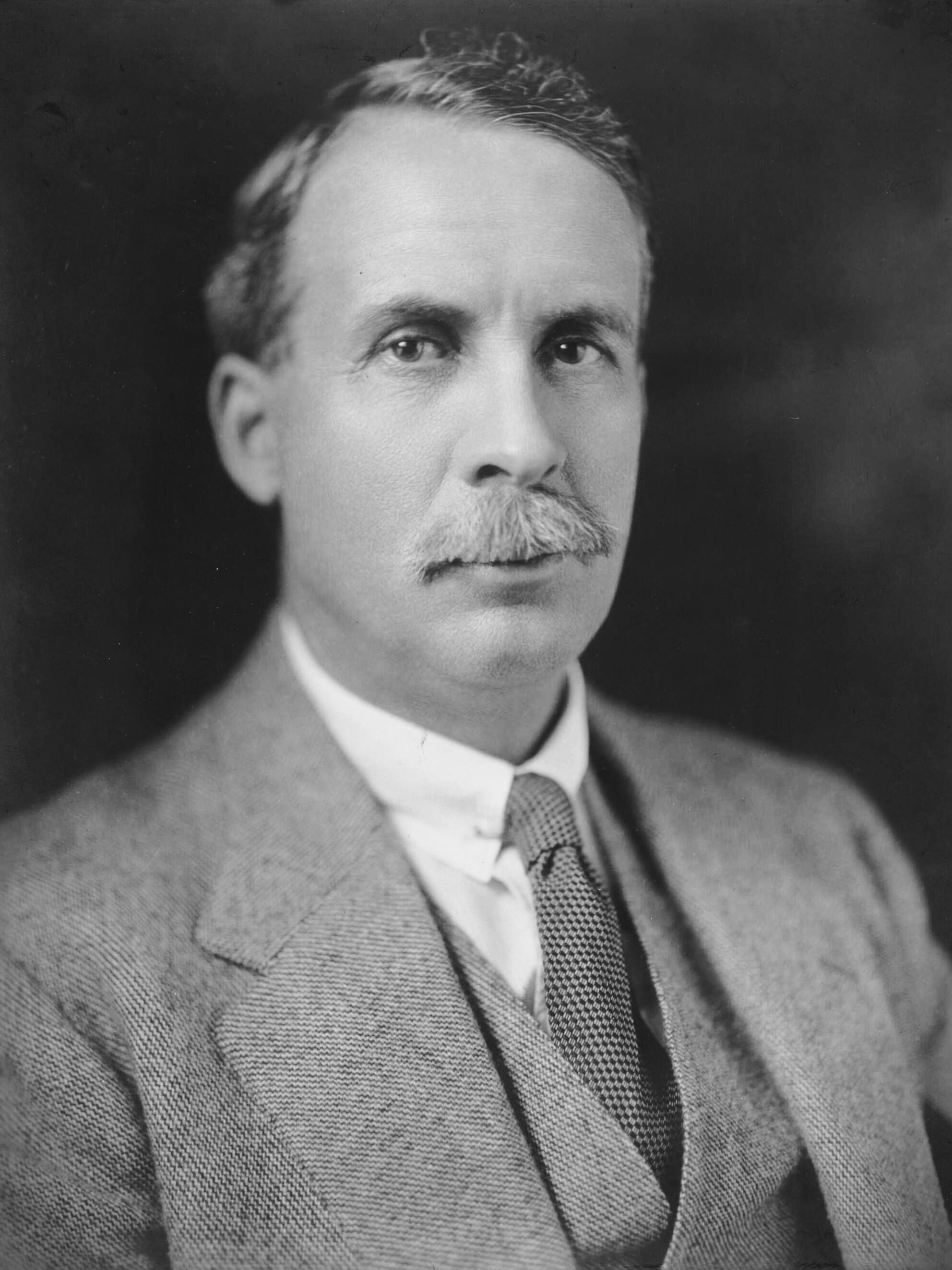
- Pearce in the 1920s

Minister for External Affairs
- In office 12 October 1934 – 29 November 1937
- Prime Minister: Joseph Lyons
- Preceded by: John Latham
- Succeeded by: Billy Hughes

Minister for Defence
- In office 6 January 1932 – 12 October 1934
- Prime Minister: Joseph Lyons
- Preceded by: Ben Chifley
- Succeeded by: Archdale Parkhill
- In office 17 September 1914 – 21 December 1921
- Prime Minister: Andrew Fisher; Billy Hughes
- Preceded by: Edward Millen
- Succeeded by: Walter Massy-Greene
- In office 29 April 1910 – 24 June 1913
- Prime Minister: Andrew Fisher
- Preceded by: Joseph Cook
- Succeeded by: Edward Millen
- In office 13 November 1908 – 2 June 1909
- Prime Minister: Andrew Fisher
- Preceded by: Thomas Ewing
- Succeeded by: Joseph Cook

Leader of the Government in the Senate
- In office 6 January 1932 – 29 November 1937
- Preceded by: John Barnes
- Succeeded by: Alexander McLachlan
- In office 9 February 1923 – 19 October 1929
- Preceded by: Edward Millen
- Succeeded by: John Daly
- In office 17 September 1914 – 17 February 1917
- Preceded by: Edward Millen
- Succeeded by: Edward Millen

Leader of the Opposition in the Senate
- In office 22 October 1929 – 6 January 1932
- Preceded by: John Daly
- Succeeded by: John Barnes

Minister for Home and Territories
- In office 21 December 1921 – 18 June 1926
- Prime Minister: Billy Hughes; Stanley Bruce
- Preceded by: Alexander Poynton
- Succeeded by: William Glasgow

Deputy Leader of the Labor Party
- In office 27 October 1915 – 14 November 1916
- Leader: Billy Hughes
- Preceded by: Billy Hughes
- Succeeded by: Albert Gardiner

Senator for Western Australia
- In office 29 March 1901 – 30 June 1938
- Preceded by: Position established
- Succeeded by: Robert Clothier

Personal details
- Born: George Foster Pearce; 14 January 1870 Mount Barker, Province of South Australia
- Died: 24 June 1952 (aged 82) Elwood, Victoria, Australia
- Party: Labor (until 1916); National Labor (1916–1917); Nationalist (1917–1931); United Australia Party (from 1931)
- Spouse: Eliza Barrett (m. 1897; died 1947)
- Occupation: Carpenter

Sir George Foster Pearce KCVO (14 January 1870 – 24 June 1952) was an Australian politician who served as a Senator for Western Australia from 1901 to 1938. He began his career in the Labor Party but later joined the National Labor Party, the Nationalist Party, and the United Australia Party; he served as a cabinet minister under prime ministers from all four parties.

Pearce was born in Mount Barker, South Australia. He left school at the age of 11 and trained as a carpenter, later moving to Western Australia and becoming involved in the union movement. He helped establish the Labor Party there, and in 1901 – aged 31 – was elected to the new federal parliament. Pearce was elevated to cabinet in 1908, under Andrew Fisher, and served in each of Fisher's three governments. He continued on in cabinet when Billy Hughes became prime minister in 1915, and after the Labor Party split of 1916 followed Hughes to the National Labor Party and then to the Nationalists. Pearce also served in cabinet under Stanley Bruce and, after joining the UAP in 1931, Joseph Lyons. He was Minister for Defence from 1908 to 1909, 1910 to 1913, 1914 to 1921, and 1932 to 1934. His 24 years in cabinet and 37 years as a senator are both records.

== Early life ==
Pearce was born on 14 January 1870 in Mount Barker, South Australia. He was the fifth of eleven children born to Jane (née Foster) and James Pearce. His father was a blacksmith of Cornish descent, born in the village of Altarnun, while his mother was born in London. An uncle, George Pearce, briefly served in the South Australian House of Assembly.

During Pearce's childhood his family lived in various locations in rural South Australia. His mother died when he was ten years old, and he left school the following year by which time the family was living in Redhill. His father briefly tried wheat farming on the Eyre Peninsula, then moved the family to Kilkerran on the Yorke Peninsula where he returned to blacksmithing. Pearce began working as a farm labourer at the age of twelve in nearby Maitland. He took up a carpentry apprenticeship in Maitland in 1885, where he also received free evening lessons from the local school headmaster. He moved to Adelaide after completing his apprenticeship, but lost his job in the early 1890s depression.

In 1892, Pearce moved to Western Australia where he found work as a carpenter in Perth. Following the discovery of gold at Coolgardie, he left Perth in March 1894 and went to the Eastern Goldfields where he joined thousands of others in prospecting for alluvial gold. While camped at Kurnalpi, Pearce and two others were attacked by Wangkatha men armed with spears, to which he responded by firing his revolver three times. He had little success in prospecting and returned to Perth in 1895.

After returning to Perth, Pearce resumed his work as a carpenter and his involvement in the labour movement, where he was a member of the Amalgamated Society of Carpenters and Joiners. In the late 1890s he "became one of Perth's most prominent trade unionists". The local labour movement at the time largely consisted of small craft unions of skilled tradesmen, with an atmosphere less militant than in the other Australian colonies. In 1897 Pearce nonetheless led a strike on building sites that led to him being blacklisted for several weeks. In the same year he purchased a home in the working-class suburb of Subiaco, working at the local Whittaker Bros. timber mill.

== Early political career ==
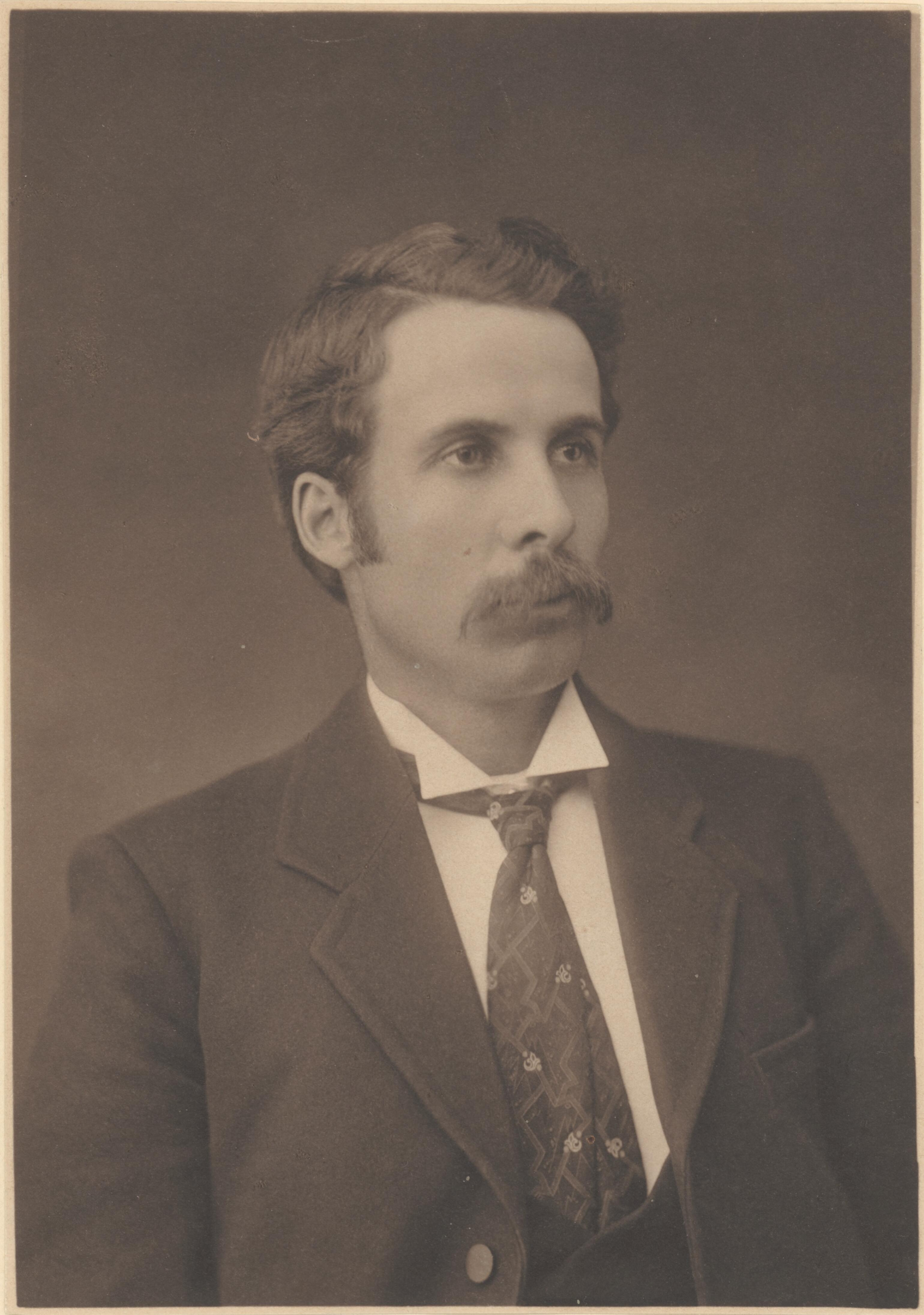
Pearce in 1901

In 1893, Pearce helped found the Progressive Political League, a precursor to the Western Australian branch of the ALP. He was elected to the Subiaco Municipal Council in 1898.

In the lead-up to Federation in 1901, Pearce joined the executive of the Western Australian Federal League and campaigned for the "Yes" vote at the referendum in July 1900 which approved Western Australia as an original state. A Trades and Labour Conference held in Perth in August 1900 agreed that labour candidates for the inaugural federal election would be subject to a preselection process for the House of Representatives and that the conference would endorse two candidates for the Senate – one from Perth and one from the Eastern Goldfields. Pearce was selected as the labour candidate from Perth and was elected to a six-year Senate term at the March 1901 federal election. He joined the parliamentary Australian Labor Party (ALP) on its formation in May 1901.

In Pearce's maiden speech to parliament, he outlined his views as a moderate socialist and looked forward to a time when "the representatives of labour and capital could join hands to the advantage of both". He also called for the nationalisation of natural monopolies, and in 1906 introduced an unsuccessful private member's bill to amend the constitution to that effect. Pearce was one of the few free traders in the Labor Party in his first years in parliament, believing high tariff policies made imports more expensive for Western Australia and had few benefits given the state's limited secondary industries. He narrowly missed out on being a member of the first Labor Party cabinet when Chris Watson became Prime Minister in 1904. He was later Chairman of Committees in the Senate from 1907 to 1908.

=== Fisher governments ===
In 1908, Pearce was elected to cabinet by the ALP caucus as a member of the first Fisher Ministry. He had long shown an interest in defence matters in the Senate and was chosen by Prime Minister Andrew Fisher to become Minister for Defence. He believed it was his duty as minister to accept "any reasonable expenditure on armament, ammunition, and accoutrements" recommended by his advisers and to resolve disagreements between sections of the military. During his first term as minister, Pearce ordered three River-class torpedo-boat destroyers for the what would become the Royal Australian Navy.

Pearce regained the defence portfolio in the second Fisher Ministry (1910–1913). During his second term as minister, he was responsible for the Naval Defence Act 1910, which created the Australian Commonwealth Naval Board and the Royal Australian Naval College. In 1911 he announced that orders had been placed for Australia's first two submarines, AE1 and AE2. Pearce attended the 1911 Imperial Conference in London where the relationship between the Royal Navy and Royal Australian Navy was determined. He oversaw the implementation of the Universal Service Scheme of compulsory military training scheme, and in 1912 approved the creation of the Central Flying School at Point Cook, Victoria, which became the "birthplace of Australian military aviation".

== Defence minister, 1914–1921 ==
=== World War I ===
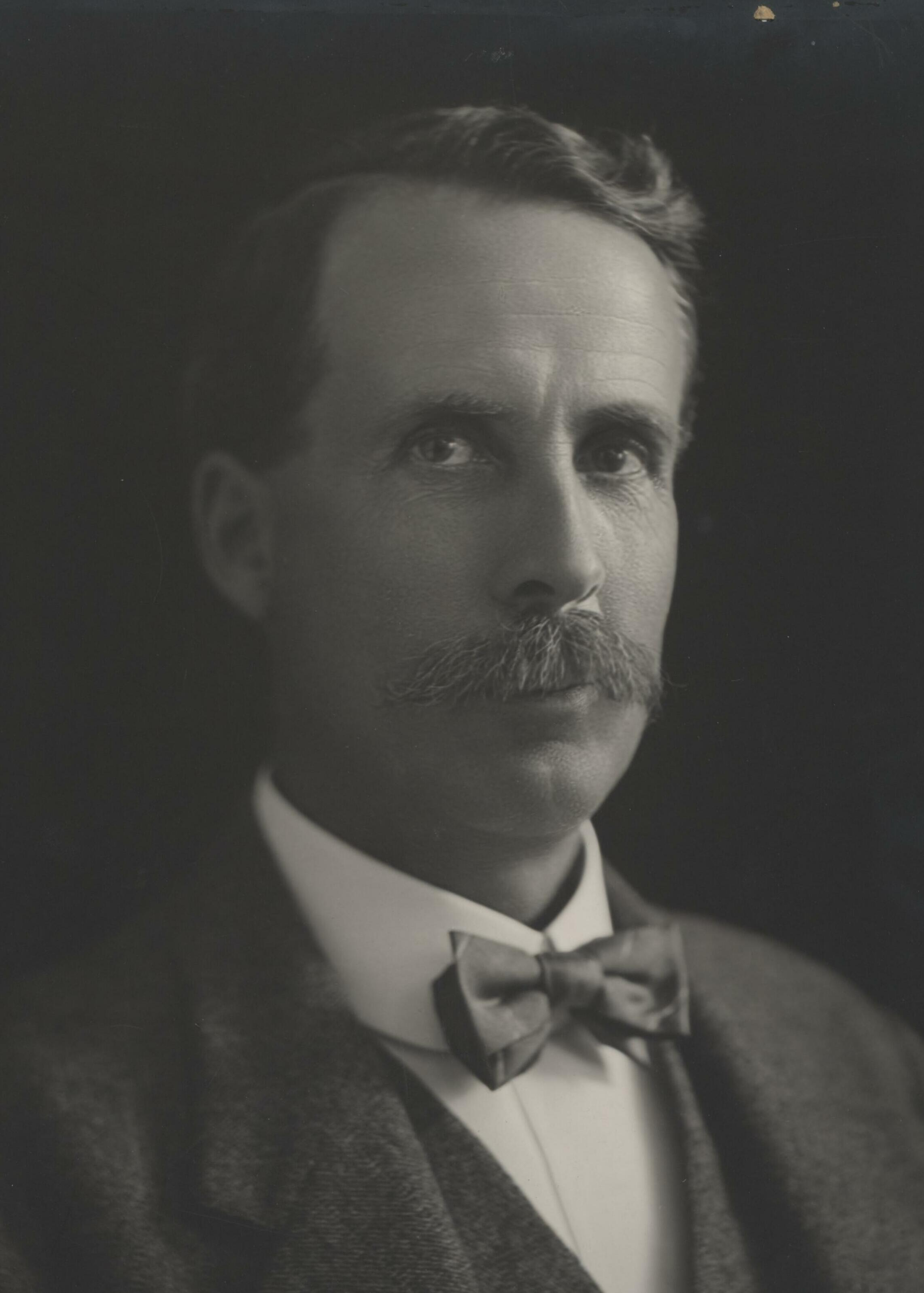
Pearce photographed by Alice Mills in the 1910s

In 1914, Australia entered World War I. Upon Billy Hughes' ascension as prime minister, Pearce was named deputy leader of the party.

Pearce served as acting prime minister from January to August 1916, while Hughes was in England and France. He was the first senator to hold the position, and the only senator to do so until Bill Spooner in 1962. Outside of the defence portfolio, Pearce oversaw the creation of Advisory Council of Science and Industry, the predecessor of the CSIRO, which Hughes had approved before his departure. In March 1916, he used the War Precautions Act 1914 to set price controls on bread and flour in metropolitan areas. On 6 July he extended this to all other foods, and on 20 July he created the Necessary Commodities Commission with the power to set prices on any item.

By the time of Hughes' return, Australia's prosecution of the war made the introduction of conscription an intensely divisive issue for the ALP. Pearce was convinced of the necessity of introducing conscription, but the majority of his party did not agree. Pearce, along with many other of the party's founding members, subsequently followed Hughes out of the party and into the new "National Labor Party". A few months later, the National Labor Party merged with the Commonwealth Liberal Party to form the Nationalist Party, with Hughes as its leader.

=== Aftermath ===
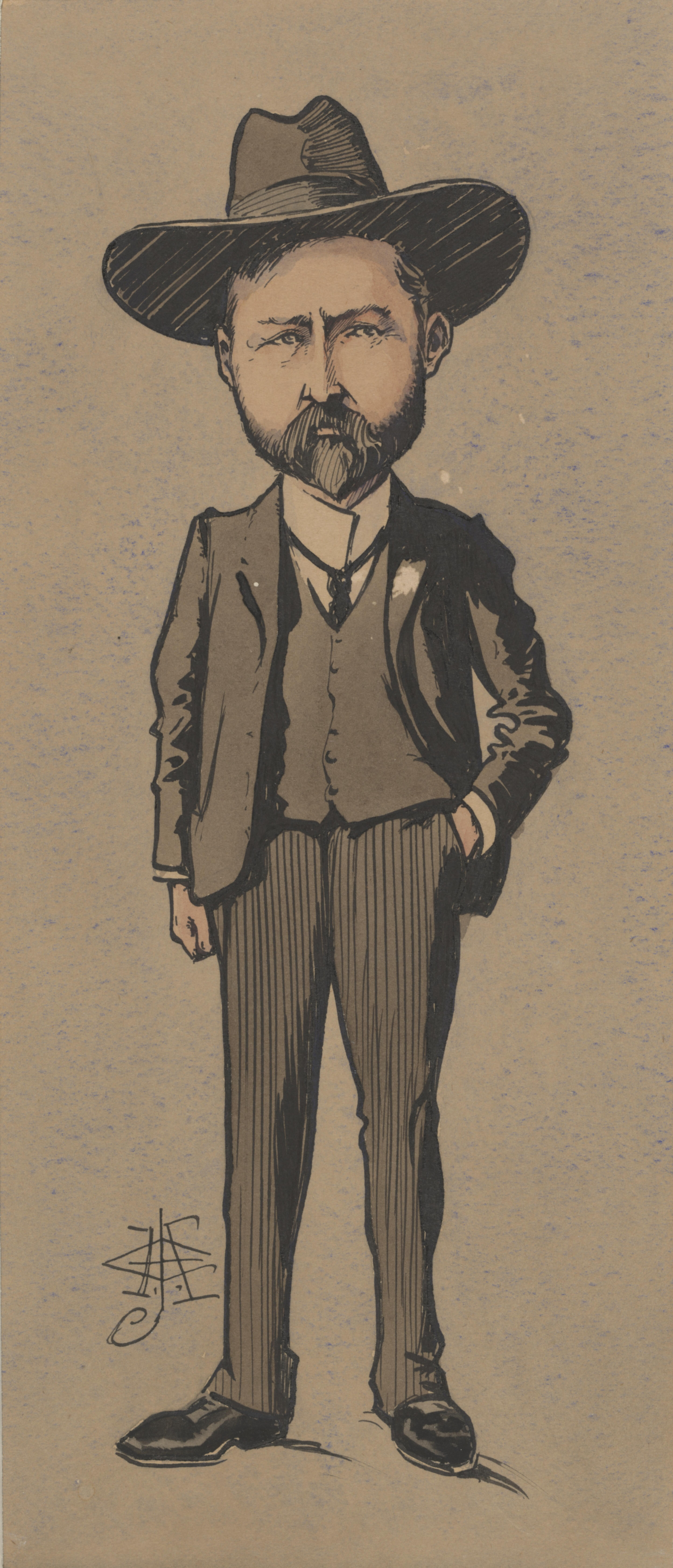
Caricature of Pearce by John Henry Chinner, c. 1920

In December 1918, following the signing of the Armistice of 11 November 1918 which ended World War I, it was announced that Pearce would be sent to London to oversee the demobilisation and repatriation of Australian troops, although a separation Repatriation Department had been established in 1917 headed by Edward Millen. The announcement received public criticism from those dissatisfied with his performance as defence minister, and a crowd gathered to boo and cat-call Pearce as his ship left Melbourne in January 1919. In London, Pearce faced a number of challenges, including conflict with British authorities over the availability of troop transport ships. In September 1919, he signed the Treaty of Saint-Germain-en-Laye with Austria on behalf of Australia. He returned to Australia the following month in time to campaign at the 1919 federal election.

In January 1920, Pearce and navy minister Joseph Cook approved the proposal of the Air Service Committee to establish the Australian Air Force as a standalone service arm, successfully lobbying cabinet for its independence from the army and navy. In the same month he convened the Senior Officers Conference to report on the size and structure of Australia's post-war military. He approved the report's recommendations around the reorganisation of the Citizen Military Force and retention of compulsory military training, but rejected a proposal to amend the Defence Act to allow Australian soldiers to serve overseas as part of British expeditionary forces. Pearce was the Australian representative at the Washington Naval Conference of 1921.

== Post-war politics ==
=== Bruce–Page government ===
Most of the defectors to the Nationalists subsequently faded into obscurity, but Pearce went on to have a successful career in the party of his erstwhile opponents. After Hughes was deposed as Nationalist leader, Pearce accepted a position in the ministry of Hughes' successor and rival, Stanley Bruce. As Minister for Home and Territories he showed a particular interest in the Northern Territory and was "the driving force" behind its division in 1927 into separate territories of Central Australia and North Australia. It was reversed by the Scullin government in 1931. He became the first Father of the Senate in 1923. He was appointed a Knight Commander of the Royal Victorian Order (KCVO) in 1927.

=== Lyons government ===
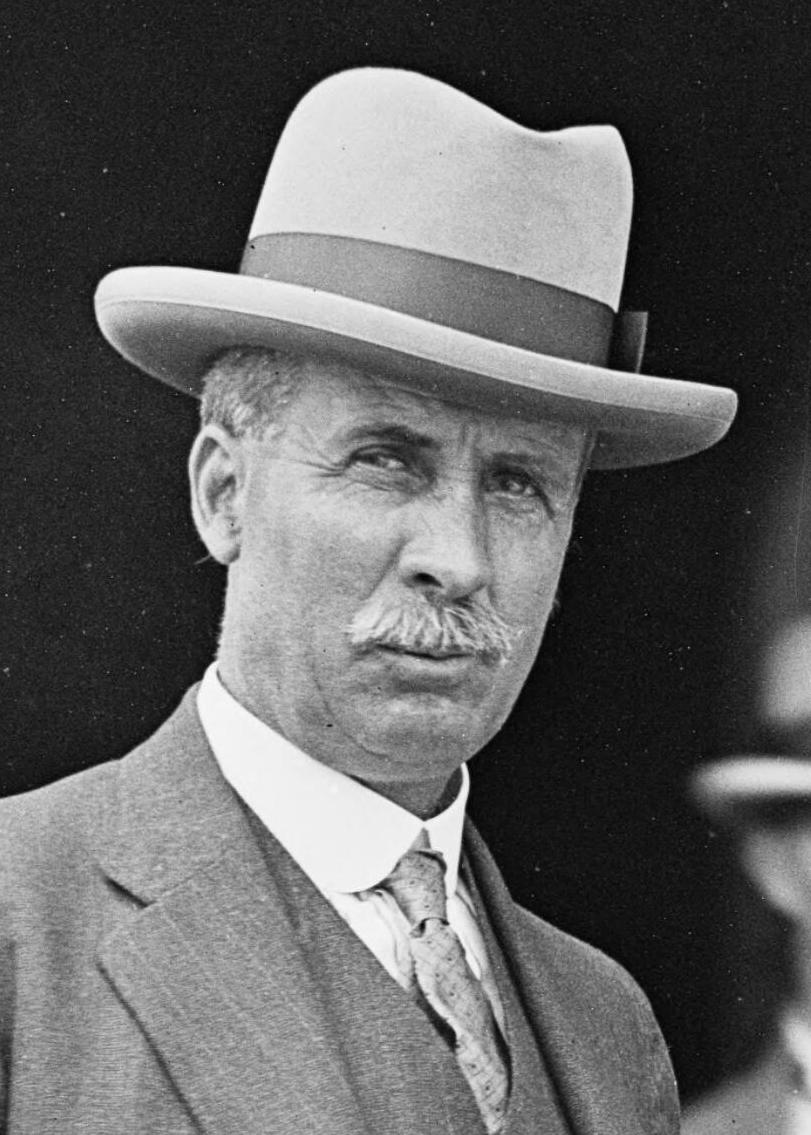
Pearce in 1927

In January 1932, following the UAP's victory at the 1931 election, Pearce was appointed defence minister for a fourth time. He articulated the defence policies that he had supported throughout his career in a September 1933 speech to the Millions Club in Sydney: "an efficient Australian navy capable of operating with the Royal Navy; a well-equipped army based on a militia; a modern air force; armaments and munitions factories; and a closer defence relationship with New Zealand". Pearce's speech attracted international attraction for its commitment to rearmament, a policy subsequently adopted by the United Kingdom and other dominions later in the 1930s. He announced that the Lyons government would allocate an additional £1.5 million in defence expenditure, effectively doubling the previous year's defence budget and reversing cuts made during the Great Depression.

Following the 1934 federal election, Pearce requested to be removed from the defence portfolio, which had begun to exhaust him. He was instead appointed Minister for External Affairs in October 1934, although he continued to maintain an interest in defence policy. He played no significant role in formulating policy, but helped establish his department as an institution in its own right, expanding the diplomatic corps and supporting the establishment of one of Australia's first foreign affairs journals, Current Notes on International Affairs. The external affairs department had previously been run as a branch of the Prime Minister's Department and did not receive its own separate head until 1935.

As external affairs minister, Pearce supported the Lyons government's diplomatic policy of appeasement of Imperial Japan while Australia continued to rearm. In October 1935, he told U.S. consul-general Jay Pierrepont Moffat that "the government remained suspicious of [Japan]'s ultimate intentions, but with British naval strength reduced below the safety point, and with American aid discounted, there was no policy open to her other than trying to be friendly with Japan and to give her no excuse to adopt an aggressive policy vis-à-vis the Commonwealth". He later echoed Lyons' calls for a Pacific non-aggression treaty between the United States and Japan.

Pearce campaigned for the "No" vote in the 1933 Western Australian secession referendum, touring the state with Lyons and Tom Brennan for two weeks. The "Yes" vote won almost a two-thirds majority, but ultimately secession did not occur. Pearce's opposition to secession played a key role in his defeat at the 1937 federal election, along with claims he had failed to defend Western Australia's interests and had not visited the state often enough. The pro-secession Sunday Times ran an anti-Pearce editorial line, while the Dominion League of Western Australia and the Wheatgrowers' Union ran a "Put Pearce Last" campaign. He resigned as a minister after the election and spent the remainder of his term as a backbencher, concluding his service on 30 June 1938. He was a senator for 37 years and three months, a record term. His total service as a minister was 24 years and seven months, also a record in the Australian Parliament.

== Later life ==
Pearce made no attempts to re-enter parliament after his defeat. He served on the Commonwealth Grants Commission from 1939 to 1944, and as chairman of the Defence Board of Business Administration from 1940 until it was abolished in 1947. Prime Minister John Curtin retained him in the latter position despite the opposition of some within the Labor Party, including Arthur Calwell and Eddie Ward. The board supervised all defence expenditure of over £10,000.

Pearce had lived mainly in Melbourne since entering the Senate, but co-owned a farm in Tenterden, Western Australia, with his son and visited regularly. He published an autobiography, Carpenter to Cabinet, in 1951, which had been written over a decade earlier. Pearce died at his home in Elwood on 24 June 1952, aged 82. At the time of his death, he was the last surviving member of the first Australian Senate elected at Federation in 1901; MHRs Billy Hughes and King O'Malley from the First Parliament would outlive him.

== Personal life ==
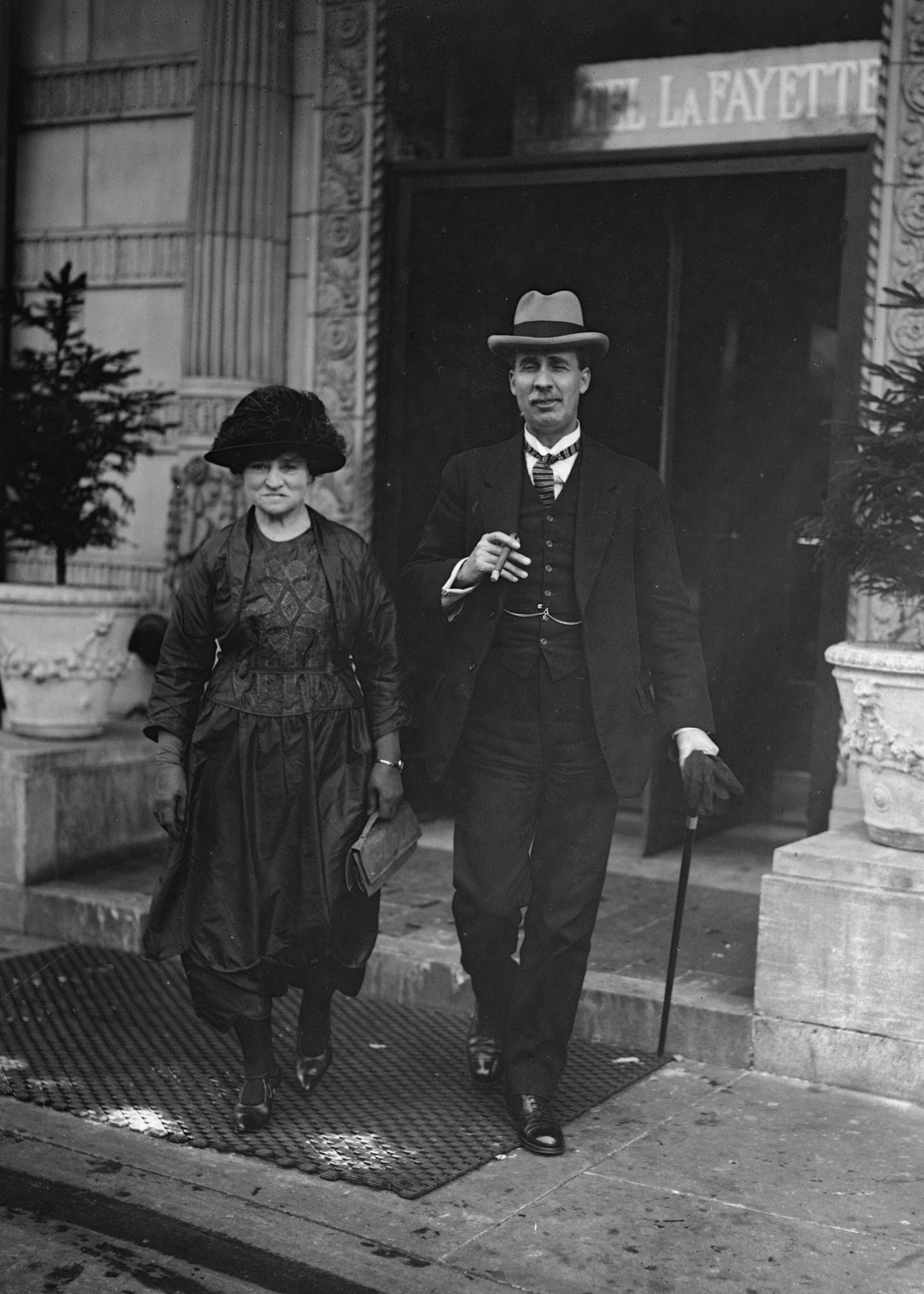
Pearce and his wife Eliza in Washington, D.C., in 1922

In 1897, Pearce married Eliza Maud Barrett, a domestic servant, at Trinity Church, Perth. They had two sons and two daughters together. He was widowed in 1947. His great-granddaughter Jane Prentice was elected to federal parliament in 2010.

== Legacy ==
Places named in Pearce's honour include RAAF Base Pearce and the electoral Division of Pearce in Western Australia, Pearce Peak in Antarctica, and the Canberra suburb of Pearce.

Australia's longest-serving prime minister Robert Menzies wrote the introduction to Peter Heydon's 1965 biography of Pearce, Quiet Decision, and recalled that he had "never sat with an abler man than George Pearce" in cabinet. Menzies praised Pearce's "profound and reflective mind", analytical way of thinking, and ability to express ideas and policy recommendations.

Parliament of Australia
New title	Senator for Western Australia; 1901–1938	Succeeded by Robert Clothier
Political offices
Preceded by Thomas Ewing	Minister for Defence; 1908–1909	Succeeded by Joseph Cook
Preceded by Joseph Cook	Minister for Defence; 1910–1913	Succeeded by Edward Millen
Preceded by Edward Millen	Minister for Defence; 1914–1921	Succeeded by Walter Massy-Greene
Preceded by Alexander Poynton	Minister for Home and Territories; 1921–1926	Succeeded by William Glasgow
Preceded by Llewellyn Atkinson	Vice-President of the Executive Council; 1926–1929	Succeeded by John Daly
Preceded by Ben Chifley	Minister for Defence; 1932–1934	Succeeded by Archdale Parkhill
Preceded by John Latham	Minister for External Affairs; 1934–1937	Succeeded by Billy Hughes
Preceded by Harry Lawson	Minister in charge of Territories; 1934–1937	Succeeded by Billy Hughes
Party political offices
Preceded by Billy Hughes	Deputy Leader of the Australian Labor Party; 1915–1916	Succeeded by Albert Gardiner
Preceded by Gregor McGregor	Leader of the Australian Labor Party in the Senate; 1914–1916	Succeeded by Albert Gardiner
New political party	Leader of the National Labor Party in the Senate; 1916–1917	Defunct political party
Preceded by Edward Millen	Leader of the Nationalist Party in the Senate; 1923–1931	Defunct political party
New political party	Leader of the United Australia Party in the Senate; 1931–1937	Succeeded by Alexander McLachlan
Honorary titles
Preceded by first	Earliest serving living Senator; 1951–1952	Succeeded by Ted Needham
