= Edward Millen =

Australian journalist and politician (1860–1923)

The Honourable Edward Millen
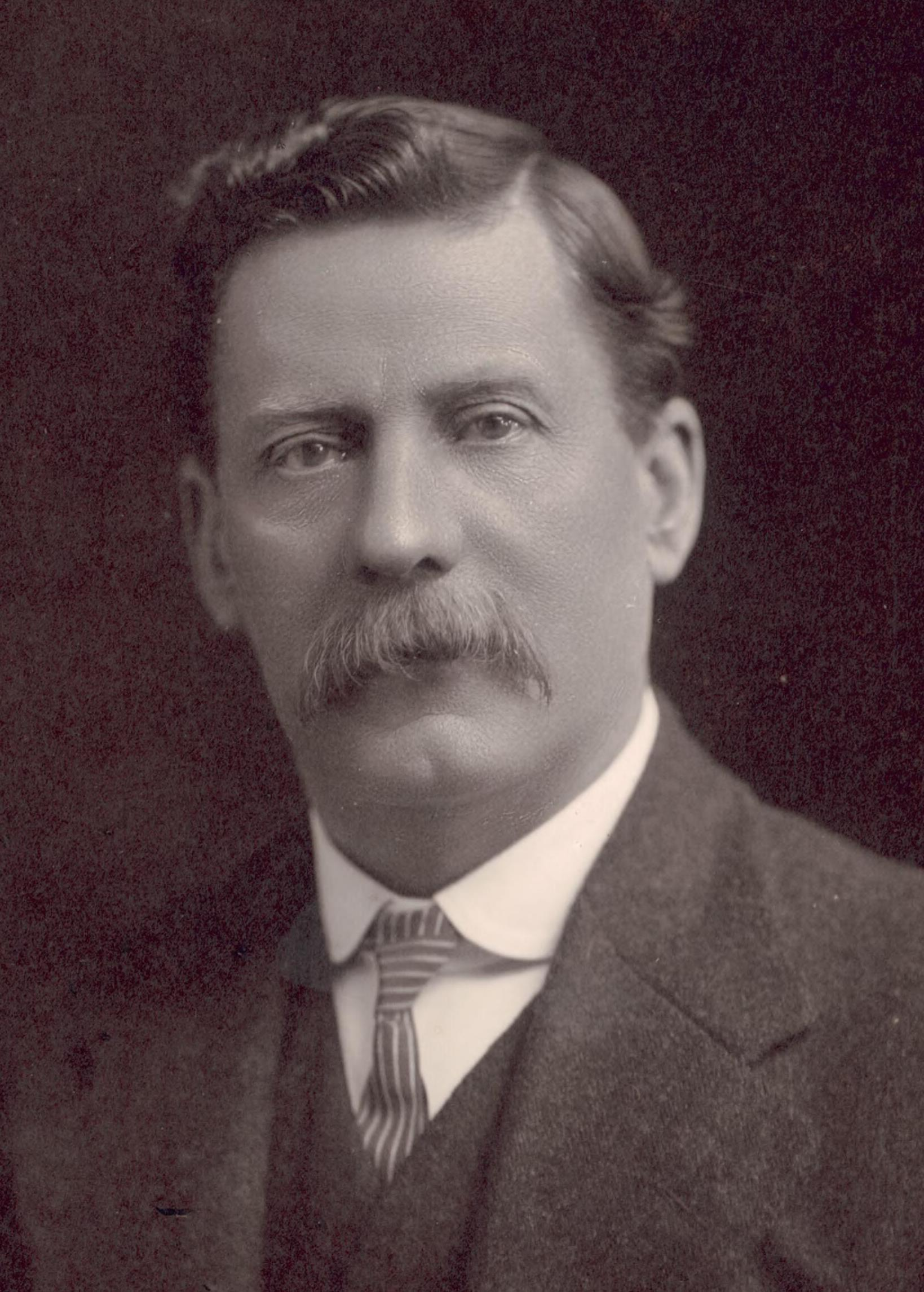
- Millen in the 1910s

Vice-President of the Executive Council
- In office 17 February 1917 – 16 November 1917
- Preceded by: William Spence
- Succeeded by: Littleton Groom
- In office 2 June 1909 – 29 April 1910
- Preceded by: Gregor McGregor
- Succeeded by: Gregor McGregor

Leader of the Government in the Senate
- In office 17 February 1917 – 9 February 1923
- Preceded by: George Pearce
- Succeeded by: George Pearce
- In office 24 June 1913 – 17 September 1914
- Preceded by: Gregor McGregor
- Succeeded by: George Pearce
- In office 2 June 1909 – 29 April 1910
- Preceded by: Gregor McGregor
- Succeeded by: Gregor McGregor

Leader of the Opposition in the Senate
- In office 17 September 1914 – 14 February 1917
- Preceded by: Gregor McGregor
- Succeeded by: Albert Gardiner
- In office 29 April 1910 – 24 June 1913
- Preceded by: Gregor McGregor
- Succeeded by: Gregor McGregor
- In office 21 November 1907 – 2 June 1909
- Preceded by: Josiah Symon
- Succeeded by: Gregor McGregor

Minister for Defence
- In office 24 June 1913 – 17 September 1914
- Preceded by: George Pearce
- Succeeded by: George Pearce

Minister for Repatriation
- In office 28 September 1917 – 9 February 1923
- Preceded by: New title
- Succeeded by: Title abolished

Senator for New South Wales
- In office 29 March 1901 – 14 September 1923
- Succeeded by: Walter Massy-Greene

Personal details
- Born: 7 November 1860 Deal, Kent, England
- Died: 14 September 1923 (aged 62) Caulfield, Victoria
- Party: Free Trade (1894–1906); Anti-Socialist (1906–09); Liberal (1909–17); Nationalist (1917–23)
- Spouse: Constance Evelyn Flanagan
- Occupation: Journalist

Edward Davis Millen (7 November 1860 – 14 September 1923) was an Australian journalist and politician who served as the first Minister for Repatriation.

Millen emigrated to Australia from England around 1880 and established himself as a journalist, subsequently serving in the New South Wales Legislative Assembly from 1894 to 1898, during which time he fiercely opposed the proposed Federation despite supporting the principle. He was a member of the New South Wales Legislative Council from 1899 until his election to the Australian Senate as a Free Trader from New South Wales at the first federal election in 1901. Millen led the conservative parties in the Senate from 1907 until shortly before his death in 1923.

He served as Vice-President of the Executive Council (1909–10) and Minister for Defence (1913–14) in two short-lived Liberal governments before his appointment as the first Minister for Repatriation in 1917. He organised the new department and co-ordinated Australia's repatriation effort, and was briefly acting Prime Minister in 1919, when he settled a seamen's strike. Millen resigned from the ministry in February 1923 and died later that year, his illness attributed to his heavy workload in the post-war years.

== Early life ==
Millen was born in Deal, Kent in 1860 to John Bullock Millen, who was a pilot of the Cinque Ports, and Charlotte (née Davis). He migrated to New South Wales in 1880, having been educated in England and employed in the marine insurance business.

On 19 February 1883, he married Constance Evelyn Flanagan at Bourke; they settled as graziers in Brewarrina.

Millen, who had worked as a journalist in Bourke and Walgett and wrote for the Central Australian and Bourke Telegraph (of which he reputedly became part-owner), became editor of the Western Herald and Darling River Advocate around 1889, part-owning the business together with Philip Chapman until 1901. During this period he also worked as a land agent, acquiring an office in O'Connell Street in Sydney and a house in Burwood by 1902.

Millen stood for the New South Wales Legislative Assembly as the Free Trade candidate for Bourke in 1891, but was defeated; he contested the seat again in 1894 and won.

He became known as a strong advocate for land reform, urging changed pastoral conditions and suggesting additional government assistance to deal with Australia's dry climate, particularly during the 1890s drought.

== State politics ==
Millen was a foundation member of the New South Wales Australasian Federation League in 1893, formed to campaign for the unification of the six Australian colonies into a single Commonwealth, and in 1896 was active at the Bathurst People's Federation Council.

His distrust of Edmund Barton's leadership led to his defeat as a candidate for the Australian Federal Convention in 1897. In the Legislative Assembly, he objected strenuously to the proposed nature of the Senate, calling equal representation for all states "objectionable and dangerous", and claimed that the New South Wales conventional delegates were elected because of their proficiency at "political business", absolving New South Wales of the obligation of endorsing their decisions. As a result, Millen opposed the 1898 Federation referendum, becoming a founding member of the Anti-Convention Bill League in April.

At the 1898 election, Millen was defeated by nine votes by a National Federal candidate.

Having overcome his opposition to Federation, he was appointed to the New South Wales Legislative Council on 8 April 1899 as one of Premier George Reid's twelve appointments to guarantee the passage of legislation for the 1899 referendum. At the first federal election in March 1901, Millen stood for the Senate as a Free Trade candidate and was elected as the second of six senators for New South Wales. He resigned his Legislative Council seat in May of that year.

== Early Senate career ==
Millen was an early leader in the Senate, serving as deputy to Josiah Symon's unofficial leadership of the Free Trade Senators in 1901. He advocated against high tariffs and bounties, claiming that industries that could not withstand free trade were "not entitled to much consideration at [the Senate's] hands". He was also a vigorous supporter of the White Australia policy, advocating the cessation of Kanaka immigration and the gradual deportation of those who had already arrived in Queensland; his opposition was based on a concern that "inferior labour would ... tend to degrade labour throughout the Commonwealth", as well as concerns about racial purity.

Millen succeeded Symon as leader of the Free Traders in the Senate in 1907, and following the Fusion with the Protectionists in 1909 became Leader of the Government in the Senate and Vice-President of the Executive Council under Prime Minister Alfred Deakin; he would lead the various conservative parties in the Senate continuously until his death.

In 1913, following Joseph Cook's one-seat victory in the election, Millen became Minister for Defence, a position he held at the outbreak of World War I. In April 1914 he refused Winston Churchill's suggestion that Australia need not maintain a fleet in its own territorial waters, and expressed "the sharpest criticism of the British" in a memorandum tabled in the Senate. He continued to privately criticise Britain's management of the war, but the Cook government ultimately placed the navy under the control of the British Admiralty in August 1914.

He oversaw the initial recruitment of 20,000 men for the Australian Imperial Force and initialised the defence proposals for the war, but following the Labor Party's victory at the 1914 election he returned to leading the Opposition in the Senate, although he did become a member of the parliamentary war committee.

== Minister for Repatriation ==
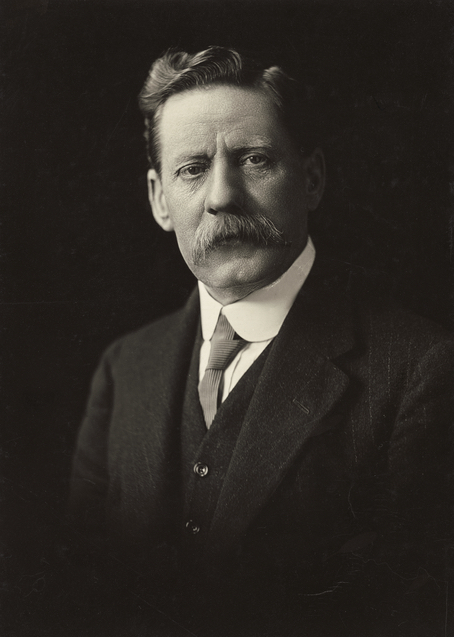
Undated photo

Following the 1916 Labor split over conscription, Millen was included in Billy Hughes's Nationalist ministry in February 1917, initially as Vice-President of the Executive Council but by September as Australia's first Minister for Repatriation, dealing largely with veterans' affairs. Together with Major Nicholas Lockyer, the controller of repatriation, Millen had responsibility for the creation of a new governmental department. The many returned servicemen in the department's staff, most of whom had little administrative experience, caused problems; Charles Bean wrote in 1918 that soldiers had "a dread of Millen as a politician first, last and all the time".

Millen organised the passage of the War Service Homes Act 1918–19, which established the War Service Homes Commission, but the administration of the scheme by Commissioner J. T. Walker led to a series of parliamentary inquiries by the joint committee of public accounts. Walker's appointment by Millen came into question, and the resulting investigation into the Commissioner's accountability to the Minister and to Parliament has been described as "one of the fullest examinations of ... ministerial responsibility for the actions of an autonomous public corporation in the history of the Commonwealth Parliament".

Millen introduced the Australian Soldiers Repatriation Bill, which provided for a paid repatriation commission and higher pensions for servicemen, into the Senate in March 1920. In response to the bill, and vigorous lobbying of Hughes by the veterans' movement, the bill faced difficulty in its passage and Senator Josiah Thomas successfully moved a resolution that a minister in one house might appear on the floor of the other. This bill would have allowed Millen to address the House of Representatives, where he was facing fierce criticism from the Country Party, although ultimately neither house acted on the resolution.

During Hughes's absence in Europe in mid-1919, the acting Prime Minister was the Treasurer, William Watt; Millen served as acting Prime Minister when Watt fell ill during July. Millen and Watt brought a successful resolution to the seamen's strike. In 1920 he was sent to Geneva as Australia's delegate to the first meeting of the General Assembly of the League of Nations, where he secured mandated Pacific protectorates for Australia despite opposition from Japan. He returned to Australia in 1921, having arranged for the funding of Australia's debts and reorganised Australia House.

Millen's heavy workload had begun to affect his health and he considered retirement, but he ultimately decided to continue and was re-elected to the Senate at the 1922 election. He retired from the ministry in February 1923, and in March was granted leave of absence because of his deteriorating health. He died aged 63 from chronic nephritis on 14 September 1923 at Caulfield in Melbourne, survived by his wife and two daughters. Presbyterian services were held at Parliament House in Melbourne and St Stephen's Church in Sydney, and Millen was given a state funeral. He is buried at Rookwood Cemetery.

== Legacy ==
Millen experienced fierce criticism from both the press and parliament during his time as Minister for Repatriation, but he is remembered as an important figure in Australia's war effort and subsequent recovery. He has been described as the "most significant" contributor to the development of repatriation in Australia, which he as inaugural minister largely defined. After his death, Billy Hughes described him as unequalled in Senate leadership, and George Pearce remembered him as "one of the ablest and most destructive critics the Federal Parliament ever had".

The Edward Millen Home for returned soldiers in Western Australia was named in his honour, along with nearby Edward Millen Park and Millen Primary School.

Political offices
Preceded by Gregor McGregor	Vice-President of the Executive Council; 1909–1910	Succeeded by Gregor McGregor
Preceded by George Pearce	Minister for Defence; 1913–1914	Succeeded by George Pearce
Preceded by William Spence	Vice-President of the Executive Council; 1917	Succeeded by Littleton Groom
New title	Minister for Repatriation; 1917–1923	Abolished
Party political offices
Preceded by Josiah Symon	Leader of the Anti-Socialist Party in the Senate; 1907–1908	Defunct political party
New political party	Leader of the Commonwealth Liberal Party in the Senate; 1908–1917	Defunct political party
New political party	Leader of the Nationalist Party in the Senate; 1917–1923	Succeeded by George Pearce
New South Wales Legislative Assembly
Preceded by Hugh Langwell; Thomas Waddell; William Willis	Member for Bourke; 1894–1898	Succeeded by William Davis
