= Hugh Langwell =

Politician and public servant in New South Wales, Australia

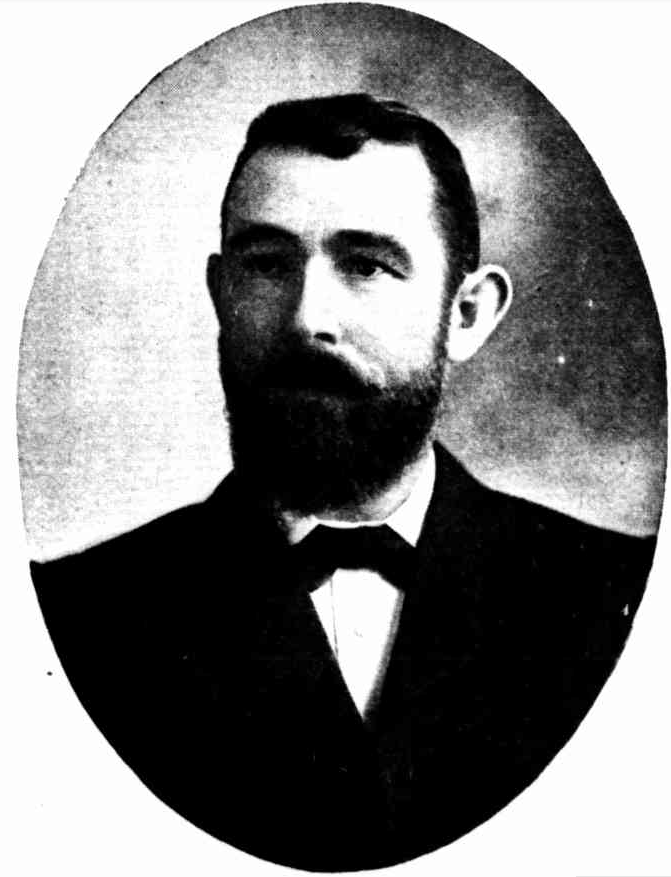
Hugh Langwell MLC in 1900

Hugh Langwell (1860 – 15 May 1933) was an Irish-born politician, trade unionist and public servant in New South Wales, Australia. He was a member of the New South Wales Legislative Assembly, Legislative Council, Amalgamated Shearers Union, Western Lands Board and Lord Howe Island Board of Control.

== Early life ==
Langwell was born in Belfast to farmer Hugh Langwell and Matilda McCully. While he was very young the family moved to Victoria and he was educated at Warrnambool. He moved to New South Wales in 1880, becoming a stationworker and shearer. Around 1892 he married Sarah Jane Brooks, with whom he had eight children. He settled in Bourke, where he owned a small newsagency, tobacconist and barber shop.

== Legislative Assembly ==
In 1891 he was the chairman and executive officer of the Bourke branch of the Amalgamated Shearers Union, and was unanimously endorsed as a candidate for the New South Wales Legislative Assembly for Bourke by the Bourke Labor Electoral League, where was the first of 3 members elected. He was not however endorsed by the new Parliamentary Labour Party, as the Bourke Labor Electoral League had modified the official Labour platform and he did not join the Labour caucus, sitting as an Independent Labour member. After taking his seat in the assembly, the first vote was that the Assembly had no confidence in the Parkes government. Labour had decided to support the Parkes government in return for concessions, however Langwell voted with the opposition, later stating that he had done so because he had been elected after campaigning in opposition to the government. Otherwise he generally voted with the Labour party. Multi-member constituencies were abolished in 1894 and Bourke was reduced from 3 members to 1. There was some doubt as to his party status at the 1894 election, with the Wagga Wagga Worker listing him as a Labor candidate, while the Brisbane Worker listed him as a modified pledge Labor candidate. The Sydney Morning Herald did not include him in its list of endorsed Labor candidates, and Antony Green lists him as an Independent Labour candidate. He was defeated at the election in 1894, and did not stand for the Legislative Assembly again.

== Legislative Council and later life ==
In 1900 he was appointed to the New South Wales Legislative Council by the protectionist Lyne government, but he resigned early in 1902, after his controversial appointment as Commissioner of the Western Lands Board by the Progressive See government on a salary of £1,000 per year. In 1912 he was appointed to inquire into the palm seed industry of Lord Howe Island. The Government, not being prepared to accept his report sent Walter Bevan to further investigate the position on the island, only to get what were essentially the same recommendations. Subsequently, he was appointed a member of the Lord Howe Island Board of Control which was responsible for administering the affairs of the island. He was Chief Commissioner and Chairman of the Western Lands Board from 1922. In 1931 the Lang government appointed a Royal Commission to inquire into the administration of the Western Lands Division, including whether the commissioners were guilty of misbehaviour or incompetence. The commissioner, Ernest Arthur Prior, found that they had been negligent and incompetent, and they were dismissed on the advice of cabinet.

== Death ==
Langwell died in Bondi on 15 May 1933 (aged 72–73).

New South Wales Legislative Assembly
Preceded by William Willis; William Davis; Thomas Waddell	Member for Bourke; 1891–1894; With: William Willis; James Howe/Thomas Waddell	Succeeded by Edward Millen
