= William Walter Davis =

Australian politician

William Walter Davis (5 July 1840 – 14 September 1923) was an Australian politician.

He was born at Bathurst to plasterer Ebeneezer Davis and Louisa Whittaker. He was educated locally and left school aged thirteen to drove near Hay, where he quickly rose to become head stockman. Around 1858 he went to Bourke as a cattle dealer, and established a butchery. He acquired a large cattle station near Bourke and converted it into a sheep station. On 30 August 1861 he married Anne Heaer at Rutherglen; they were childless, but he married twice more: on 14 November 1870 at Bourke to Catharine Maxwell, with whom he had eight children; and on 12 March 1885 at Blayney to Florence Jane Whittaker, with whom he had a further eight children. In 1886, he sunk New South Wales' first Artesian bore, and extended his land holdings into Queensland. In 1889 he was elected to the New South Wales Legislative Assembly as the Protectionist member for Bourke. Defeated in 1891, he ran unsuccessfully in 1894 and 1895 before being returned in 1898. He did not contest in 1904 with the reduction in the Assembly's size, but was the unsuccessful Liberal candidate for Darling in 1907. Davis died at Randwick in 1923.

New South Wales Legislative Assembly
| Preceded by Thomas Waddell; Alexander Wilson | Member for Bourke; 1889–1891; Served alongside: Thomas Waddell, William Willis | Succeeded by James Howe; Hugh Langwell |
| Preceded by Edward Millen | Member for Bourke; 1898–1904 | Abolished |
