= Russell Barton =

Australian politician

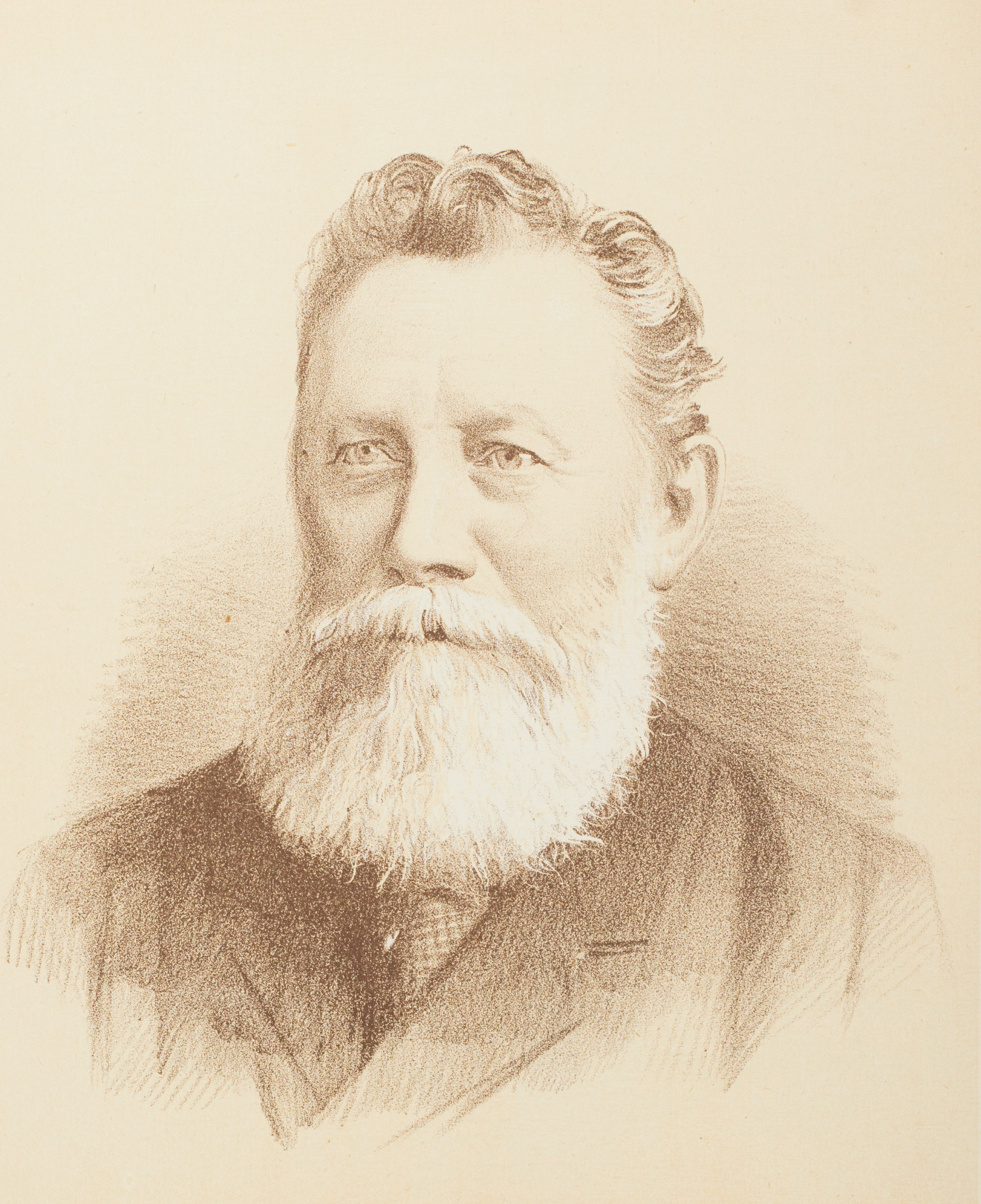
Russell Barton, MLA for Bourke

Russell Barton (1830 – 30 June 1916) was a British-born Australian politician.

He was born at Penge to grazier Edmund Russell Barton and Sophia Russell. The family migrated to Adelaide in 1839, where Barton worked on cattle and sheep stations before becoming a carrier for a copper mine at Burra Burra. He went to the Victorian goldfields in the early 1850s and on his return bought land around Adelaide. In 1855 he married Jane McCulloch Davey (1833 - 1927), with whom he had eleven children; one was William Wickstead Barton (1868 - 1924), mine manager and pastoralist.

His property was destroyed by fire in 1855, and he managed a number of sheep stations, including one on the Bogan River in New South Wales. He focused on his New South Wales properties from the 1860s and also speculated in mining.

He was one of the early owners of the Great Cobar mine, and also was involved in other mines at Nymagee and Broken Hill. He was a director of Mercantile Mutual Insurance Co. Ltd, Mutual Life Insurance Co., the British and Foreign Marine Insurance Co. Ltd, and was managing director of the Pastoral Finance Association Ltd.

He was elected to the New South Wales Legislative Assembly for Bourke at the 1880 election, holding the seat at the 1882, and 1885 elections. He resigned his seat in December 1886, and a by-election was held, however parliament was dissolved before the writ was returned.

He died, on 30 June 1916 (aged 85–86), at what was then part of Five Dock, now Russell Lea, a suburb of Sydney. The suburb takes its name from Barton's grand Italianate house and its 60 acres of land, 'Russell Lea Manor', also known as 'Russell Lea House'. As well as being Barton's first name, Russell was the maiden name of Russell Barton's mother.

New South Wales Legislative Assembly
New seat	Member for Bourke; 1880–1886; With: none Richard Machattie/William Sawers	Succeeded by Thomas Waddell; Alexander Wilson
