= Richard Machattie =

Australian politician

Richard Randolph Machattie (7 December 1843 – 27 December 1902) was an Australian politician.

Machattie was born at Bathurst, a son of the medical doctor Richard Machattie, for whom the park in Bathurst was named. He attended Bathurst Grammar School. He became a government surveyor, in the Carcoar and Bathurst districts. In 1882 he was elected to the New South Wales Legislative Assembly for Bourke, but he was defeated in 1885. A squatter at Brewarrina from 1884, the 1890s drought forced him to abandon his properties. Machattie died at Bathurst in 1902.

The doctor Thomas Alfred Machattie (22 February 1855 – 1928) was a brother.

New South Wales Legislative Assembly
Preceded by Russell Barton	Member for Bourke; 1882–1885; Served alongside: Russell Barton	Succeeded by William Sawers
