= William Nicholas Willis =

Australian politician

William Nicholas Willis (3 August 1858 – 3 April 1922) was an Australian politician and newspaper proprietor.

== Early life ==
Willis was born in Mudgee, New South Wales and educated in Mudgee and, briefly, at St Mary's School in Sydney, which he left at age nine to help support his mother after his father's departure to California. He worked first as an office boy.

He eventually became a successful hawker along the Macquarie, Darling and Bogan rivers. Between 1879 and 1888, he opened and managed stores in partnership with T. L. Richardson, at Girilambone, Nyngan, and Brewarrina. He bought the Central Australian and Bourke Telegraph.

In 1888, he married Mary Hayes and became a grazier near Brewarrina.

== Political career ==
Willis ran unsuccessfully for Bourke in the New South Wales Legislative Assembly in 1887, but won it as a Protectionist in 1889 and held it to 1894. Willis founded the Truth in 1890. He was the member for The Barwon from 1894 to 1904. He had become a supplier of horses and fodder to the British Army in South Africa and he recruited Australian bushmen as scouts and sharpshooters during the Boer War.

John Haynes constantly accused Willis and Paddy Crick of corrupt land deals in the Newsletter. On the appointment of a Royal Commission under William Owen to investigate the administration of the Lands Department in 1905, Willis fled to Western Australia and South Africa.

He was brought back to Sydney in 1906, but although tried twice for obtaining money by false pretences, fraud and conspiracy, the juries failed to agree on a verdict.

== Later life ==
Willis had relocated to the Straits Settlements by September 1910, where he race and sold horses in Penang and Singapore. According to a contemporary police report, "his associates in Singapore were jockeys, book-makers and pimps" and he was "excessively drunk", frequenting Singapore's red-light district.

Willis later moved to London, where in November 1911 he was convicted of illegally importing cigars. In 1912, he published, with Mrs Olive MacKirdy, The White Slave Market. This book alleged Singapore was a centre for European prostitution, the headquarters of the "pimps" in the East — still the burial-ground of thousands upon thousands of unfortunate white girls. Malay Street, with its hundreds of houses of ill-fame, still flourishes … 90 percent had VD and claimed that there were 510 brothels in the city.

== Notes ==
New South Wales Legislative Assembly
Preceded by Thomas Waddell; Alexander Wilson	Member for Bourke; 1889 – 1894; Served alongside: Waddell/Howe/Waddell, Davis/Langwell	Succeeded by Edward Millen
Preceded by New seat	Member for The Barwon; 1894 – 1904	Succeeded by Abolished
