= William Sawers =

Australian politician

The Honourable William Sawers
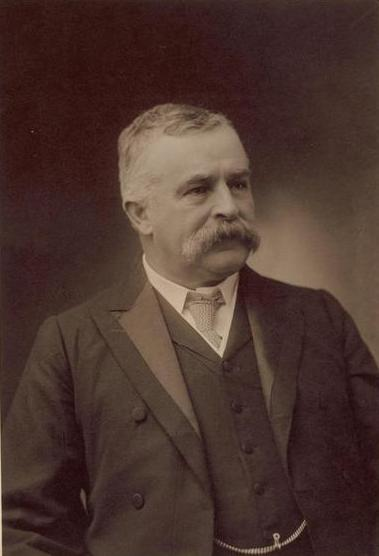

Member of the Australian Parliament for New England
- In office 29 March 1901 – 16 December 1903
- Preceded by: New seat
- Succeeded by: Edmund Lonsdale

Personal details
- Born: 1844 Stirlingshire, Scotland
- Died: 19 May 1916 (aged 71–72) Neutral Bay, New South Wales, Australia
- Party: Protectionist Party
- Occupation: Grazier

William Bowie Stewart Campbell Sawers (1844 – 19 May 1916) was a Scottish-born Australian politician. Born in Stirlingshire in Scotland, where he was educated, he migrated to Australia in 1865, becoming a grazier with large holdings. In 1885 he was elected to the New South Wales Legislative Assembly as the member for Bourke, holding the seat until 1886; later, in 1898, he was elected to the seat of Tamworth. In 1901 he resigned from the Legislative Assembly in order to contest the first federal election as the Protectionist candidate for New England; he won narrowly. He was defeated in 1903 by a Free Trade candidate. Sawers died in 1916.

New South Wales Legislative Assembly
Preceded by Richard Machattie	Member for Bourke; 1885–1886; Served alongside: Barton	Succeeded by Alexander Wilson
Preceded by Albert Piddington	Member for Tamworth; 1898–1901	Succeeded by Raymond Walsh
Parliament of Australia
New seat	Member for New England; 1901–1903	Succeeded by Edmund Lonsdale
