= Thomas Waddell =

Australian politician (1854–1940)

The Honourable Thomas Waddell
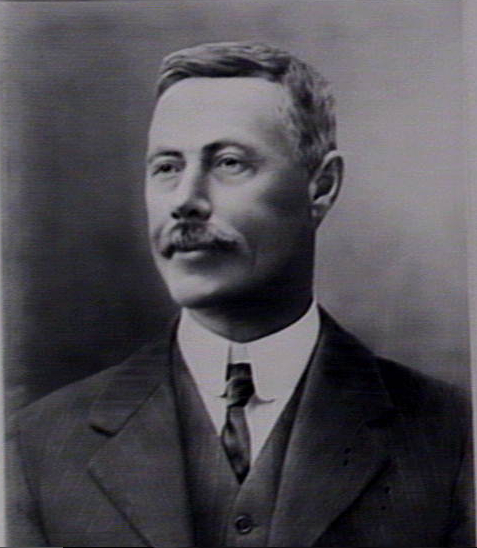

15th Premier of New South Wales
- In office 15 June 1904 – 29 August 1904
- Preceded by: Sir John See
- Succeeded by: Joseph Carruthers
- Constituency: Cowra

Personal details
- Born: 1 January 1854 County Monaghan, Ireland
- Died: 25 October 1940 (aged 86) Ashfield, New South Wales, Australia
- Party: Progressive Party
- Spouse: Elizabeth James
- Children: 3(m), 4(f)

Thomas Waddell (1 January 1854 – 25 October 1940), an Australian politician, was a member of the New South Wales Legislative Assembly from 1887 to 1917, was briefly the premier of New South Wales during 1904, and was a member of the New South Wales Legislative Council from 1917 to 1934. His 75 days in office marks the shortest tenure of any New South Wales premier.

== Early life ==
He was born in County Monaghan, Ireland, son of John and Ann Waddell and was brought to Australia when a few months old. He grew up near Lake George, New South Wales, northeast of Canberra and was educated at Collector public school and at George Metcalfe's High School, Goulburn. At 15 he started work as a shop assistant and then became clerk of petty sessions at Collector Court. He began selling cattle and horses in 1876 and spent some time at Cooper Creek in western Queensland. Together with his brother George, he bought three stations in far western New South Wales and managed them for five years before selling them in the boom of the 1880s.

== Parliamentary career ==
In February 1887 he was elected as member for Bourke in the Legislative Assembly and in May 1887 he married Elizabeth, daughter of John James of Orange. In the July 1891 election he lost his seat to James Peter Howe, but won it back again at a by-election following Howe's resignation in October 1891. He was elected as member for Cobar in July 1894 and Cowra in July 1898. In April 1901 he became colonial treasurer in the See government and handled the portfolio well in difficult times. When See resigned in June 1904, he recommended to Governor Sir Harry Rawson that he appoint Paddy Crick, but Rawson did not favour Crick because of his excessive drinking in Executive Council meetings and in due course asked Waddell to be premier.

Two months later Waddell's government faced a general election, and he won re-election to the renamed seat of Belubula, but his Progressive Party lost badly to Joseph Carruthers' Liberal Reform Party and he ceased to be premier, colonial treasurer and justice minister on 29 August. The Labor Party became the official opposition. He attempted to hold the Progressive Party together, but in May 1907 he accepted an offer to become Colonial Secretary in Carruthers Government. The Progressive Party disintegrated after the September 1907 election.

When Charles Wade became premier in October 1907, Waddell became colonial treasurer until the Government's defeat by James McGowen's Labor Party in the 1910 election. As treasurer, he reduced income tax and repealed stamp duty. He remained member for Belubula until 1917 and served in the Legislative Council from 1917 to 1934, when elections to the council were introduced.

Waddell died in Ashfield on 25 October 1940. He was survived by his wife and three sons and four daughters.

Two of his nephews were also members of parliament, John Waddell was the member for Waverley in the Legislative Assembly from 1932 until 1939, and Sir Graham Waddell was a member of the Legislative Council from 1937 until 1949.

== In Media ==
Thomas Waddell is the target of Banjo Paterson's poem The Premier and the Socialist. https://en.wikisource.org/wiki/The_Premier_and_the_Socialist

== Notes ==
New South Wales Legislative Assembly
Preceded by Russell Barton	Member for Bourke; 1887 – 1891; Served alongside: Wilson/Willis, Davis/Langwell	Succeeded by James Howe
Preceded by James Howe	Member for Bourke; 1891 – 1894; Served alongside: Willis, Langwell	Succeeded by Edward Millen
New district	Member for Cobar; 1894 – 1898	Succeeded by William Spence
Preceded by Michael Phillips	Member for Cowra; 1898 – 1904	District abolished
New district	Member for Belubula; 1904 – 1913	District abolished
New district	Member for Lyndhurst; 1913 – 1917	Succeeded by Claude Bushell
Political offices
Preceded by Sir William Lyne	Colonial Treasurer of New South Wales; 1901–1904	Succeeded by Sir Joseph Carruthers
Vacant Title last held by Robert Fitzgerald	Minister for Justice; 1904	Succeeded by Charles Wade
Preceded by Sir John See	Premier of New South Wales; 1904	Succeeded by Sir Joseph Carruthers
Preceded by James Hogue	Colonial Secretary of New South Wales; 1907	Succeeded by William Wood
Preceded by Sir Joseph Carruthers	Colonial Treasurer of New South Wales; 1907–1910	Succeeded by James McGowen
Party political offices
Preceded by Sir John See	Leader of the Progressive Party; 1904–1907	Merged into Liberal Reform Party
