= Electoral district of Bourke =

State electoral district of New South Wales, Australia

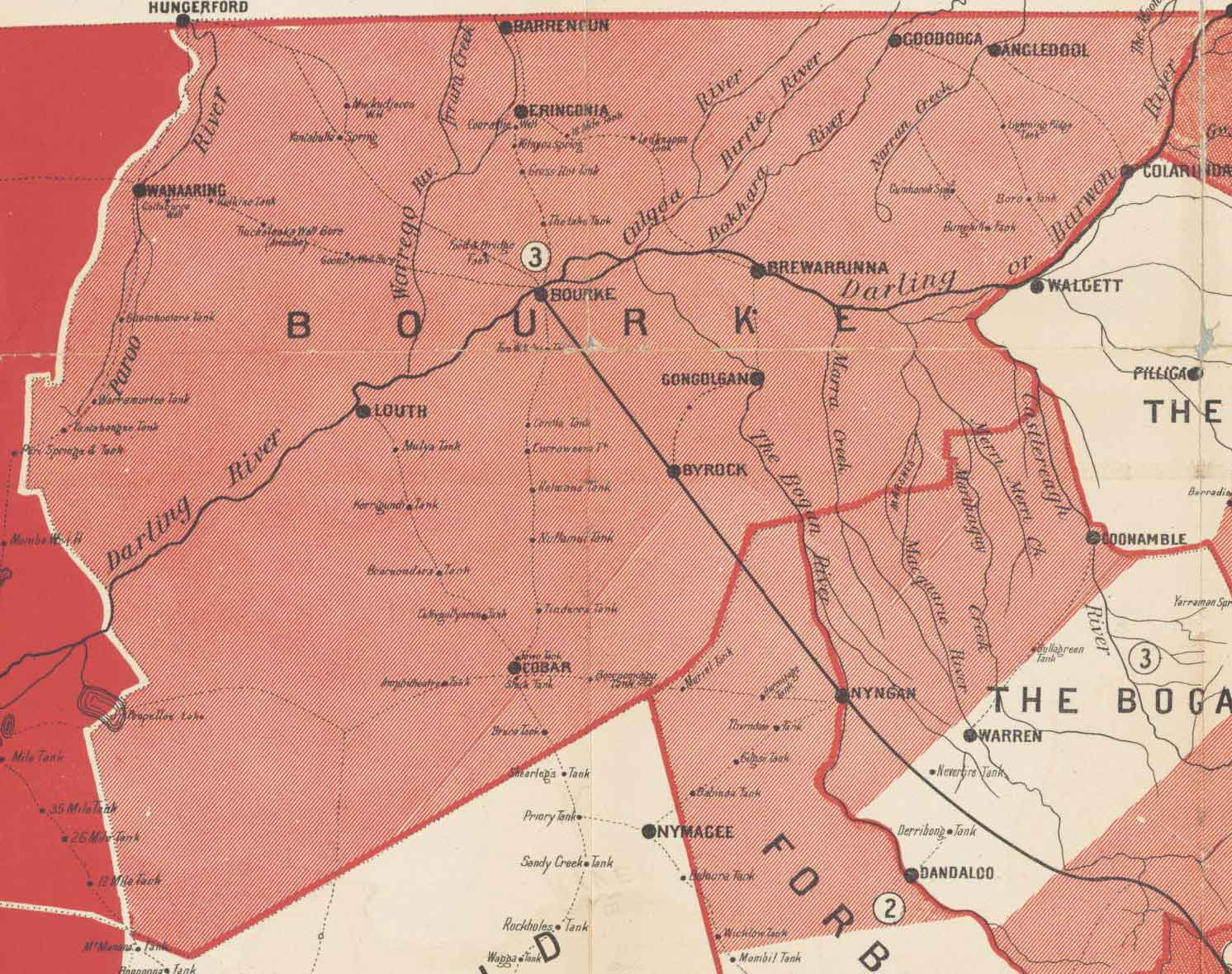
1892 map of Bourke electoral district

Bourke was an electoral district of the Legislative Assembly in the Australian state of New South Wales from 1880 to 1904, including the towns of Bourke and Cobar. It elected two members simultaneously between 1882 and 1889 increasing to three members until 1894, with each elector being able to vote for as many candidates as there were vacancies.

== History ==
Bourke was created in 1880, one of 23 new districts, (Note: The other new districts were Albury, Balmain, Boorowa, Durham, Forbes, Glen Innes, Gloucester, Grafton, Grenfell, Gundagai, Gunnedah, The Hastings and Manning, Inverell, The Macleay, Molong, The Namoi, Redfern, The Richmond, South Sydney, Tamworth, Tumut, Wentworth and Young.) established under the Electoral Act 1880 (NSW) which was the first major redistribution since 1858. The district was formed from parts of The Bogan, Balranald and included the major towns of Bourke and Cobar. It included the pastoral district of Warrego as well as parts of the pastoral districts of Bligh, Wellington and Albert. It did not include any part of the Bourke County which was in The Murrumbidgee. Bourke was a key agricultural trading hub, owing to its position as a port on the Darling River, while Cobar's economy was centered around copper mining.

At its establishment in 1880 Bourke had the largest number of enrolled voters per seat with 3,478 voters returning a single member, compared with the state average of 1,549 for a country seat and 2,361 for an urban one, The Electoral Act 1880 provided that a district would return a second member if the electoral roll reached 3,000, a third member upon reaching 5,000 and a fourth member on reaching 8,000. Bourke returned a second member from the 1882 election, and a third member from the 1889 election.

When multi-member constituencies were abolished in 1894, Bourke was reduced in size and parts were given to the new districts of Cobar and The Barwon.

The district was abolished in 1904 as a result of the 1903 New South Wales referendum, which reduced the number of members of the Legislative Assembly from 125 to 90. Bourke was absorbed by the new district of The Darling, along with parts of The Barwon and Wilcannia.

== Members for Bourke ==
(1880–1882, 1 member)
Member	Party	Term						
Russell Barton	None	1880–1882						
(1882–1889, 2 members)
Member	Party	Term	Member	Party	Term			
Russell Barton	None	1882–1886	Richard Machattie	None	1882–1885			
Russell Barton	None	1882–1886	William Sawers	None	1885–1886			
Thomas Waddell	Free Trade	1887–1889	Alexander Wilson	Free Trade	1887–1889			
(1889–1894, 3 members)
Member	Party	Term	Member	Party	Term	Member	Party	Term
Thomas Waddell	Protectionist	1889–1891	William Willis	Protectionist	1889–1894	William Davis	Protectionist	1889–1891
James Howe	Protectionist	1891–1891	William Willis	Protectionist	1889–1894	Hugh Langwell	Independent Labor	1891–1894
Thomas Waddell	Protectionist	1891–1894	William Willis	Protectionist	1889–1894	Hugh Langwell	Independent Labor	1891–1894
(1894–1904, 1 member)
Member	Party	Term						
Edward Millen	Free Trade	1894–1898						
William Davis	Protectionist	1898–1901						
William Davis	Progressive	1901–1904						

== Election results ==
1901 New South Wales state election: Bourke
Party	Candidate	Votes	%	±%
Progressive	William Davis	unopposed		
Progressive hold				
