= Members of the New South Wales Legislative Assembly, 1894–1895 =

This is a list of members of the New South Wales Legislative Assembly who served in the 16th parliament of New South Wales from 1894 to 1895 They were elected at the 1894 colonial election on 17 July 1894. The Speaker was Sir Joseph Palmer Abbott.

Name	Party	Electorate	Term in office
Joseph Abbott	Free Trade	Newtown-Camperdown	1888–1895
Sir Joseph Palmer Abbott	Protectionist	Wentworth	1880–1901
William Affleck	Free Trade	Yass	1894–1904
George Anderson	Ind. Free Trade	Waterloo	1894–1904
James Ashton	Free Trade	Hay	1894–1907
John Barnes	Protectionist	Gundagai	1889–1904
Thomas Bavister	Free Trade	Ashfield	1891–1898
George Black	Independent Labour	Sydney-Gipps	1891–1898 1910–1917
Herbert Brown	Ind. Free Trade	Durham	1875–1898
Thomas Brown	Independent Labour	Condoublin	1894–1901 1913–1917
James Brunker	Free Trade	East Maitland	1880–1904
Angus Cameron	Free Trade	Waverley	1874–1889 1894–1896
Alexander Campbell	Ind. Protectionist	Kiama	1894–1904
Archibald Campbell	Free Trade	Illawarra	1891–1903
John Cann	Labour	Broken Hill	1891–1916
James Carroll	Ind. Protectionist	Lachlan	1894–1904
Joseph Carruthers	Free Trade	St George	1887–1908
John Chanter	Protectionist	Deniliquin	1885–1901
Austin Chapman	Protectionist	Braidwood	1891–1901
Henry Chapman	Free Trade	Sydney-Fitzroy	1894–1895 1898–1901
Edward Clark ^{2}	Free Trade	Willoughby	1891–1904 1907–1910
Francis Clarke	Protectionist	Hastings and Macleay	1893–1898 1900–1901
Charles Collins	Free Trade	Narrabri	1885– 1887 1890–1898
Joseph Cook	Independent Labour / Free Trade (Note: Despite being the inaugural Labour Leader in the previous parliament, Joseph Cook stood as an independent Labour candidate in the 1894 election and became the Postmaster General in George Reid's Free Trade government.)	Hartley	1891–1901
Henry Copeland	Protectionist	Armidale	1877–1883, 1883–1895, 1895–1900
Paddy Crick	Protectionist	West Macquarie	1889–1906
George Cruickshank	Protectionist	Inverell	1889–1901
Joseph Cullen ^{3}	Free Trade	Willoughby	1891–1894
Thomas Davis	Labour	Sydney-Pyrmont	1891–1898
Sir George Dibbs	Protectionist	Tamworth	1874–1877, 1882–1895
William Dick	Free Trade	Newcastle East	1894–1907
Denis Donnelly	Protectionist	Cowra	1891–1896
Alfred Edden	Independent Labour	Kahibah	1891–1920
James Ellis	Free Trade	Newcastle West	1882–1885 1887–1889 1894–1895
Thomas Ewing	Protectionist	Lismore	1885–1901
Frank Farnell	Free Trade	Ryde	1887–1898 1901–1903
John Fegan	Free Trade	Wickham	1891–1907 1920–1922
William Ferguson	Labour	Sturt	1894–1904
Robert Fitzgerald	Protectionist	Robertson	1885–1901
Thomas Fitzpatrick	Protectionist	Murrumbidgee	1894–1904
Robert Fowler	Free Trade	Sydney-Phillip	1894–1895
Albert Gardiner	Labour	Ashburnham	1891–1895 1904–1907
Jacob Garrard	Free Trade	Sherbrooke	1880–1898
John Gillies	Ind. Free Trade	West Maitland	1891–1911
James Gormly	Protectionist	Wagga Wagga	1885–1904
Albert Gould	Free Trade	Singleton	1882–1898
James Graham	Free Trade	Sydney-Belmore	1894–1901 1907–1910
George Greene ^{1}	Free Trade	Grenfell	1889–1891 1894 1895–1898
Arthur Griffith	Labour	Waratah	1894–1903 1904–1920
Matthew Harris	Free Trade	Sydney-Denison	1894–1901
Thomas Hassall	Protectionist	Moree	1886–1901
John Hawthorne	Ind. Free Trade	Leichhardt	1885–1891 1894–1904
James Hayes	Protectionist	Murray	1885–1904
John Haynes	Free Trade	Wellington	1887–1904 1915–1917
Patrick Hogan	Protectionist	Raleigh	1885–1887 1889–1895
James Hogue	Free Trade	Glebe	1894–1910
Leslie Hollis	Free Trade	Goulburn	1891–1898
Billy Hughes	Labour	Sydney-Lang	1894–1901
Llewellyn Jones	Ind. Free Trade	Petersham	1894–1898
Robert Jones	Free Trade	Mudgee	1891–1998 1907–1910
Travers Jones	Protectionist	Tumut	1885–1891 1894–1898
Joseph Kelly ^{2}	Protectionist	Tweed	1894–1898
John Kidd	Protectionist	Camden	1880–1882 1885–1887 1889–1904
John Kirkpatrick	Labour	Gunnedah	1891–1895
Adrian Knox	Ind. Free Trade	Woollahra	1894–1898
Sydney Law	Labour	Balmain South	1894–1907
Charles Lee	Free Trade	Tenterfield	1884–1920
Samuel Lees	Free Trade	Nepean	1887–1895 1898–1901
Robert Levien	Protectionist	Quirindi	1880–1889, 1889–1913
Michael Loughnane ^{1}	Labour	Grenfell	1894–1895
William Lyne	Protectionist	Hume	1880–1901
Hugh Macdonald	Labour	Coonamble	1894–1906
Kenneth Mackay ^{4}	Protectionist	Boorowa	1895–1899
William Mahony	Free Trade	Annandale	1894–1910
James Martin	Free Trade	Sydney-Bligh	1889–1895
William McCourt ^{5}	Free Trade	Bowral	1882–1885 1887–1913
John McFarlane	Protectionist	Clarence	1887–1915
James McGowen	Labour	Redfern	1891–1917
Francis McLean	Free Trade	Marrickville	1894–1901
William McMillan	Free Trade	Burwood	1887–1898
William Millard	Free Trade	Moruya	1894–1920 1920–1921
Edward Millen	Free Trade	Bourke	1894–1898
Gus Miller	Protectionist	Monaro	1889–1918
Edmund Molesworth	Free Trade	Newtown-Erskine	1889–1901
Samuel Moore	Free Trade	Bingara	1885–1910
James Morgan	Protectionist	Dubbo	1891–1895
William Morgan	Ind. Free Trade	Hawkesbury	1894–1901
Philip Morton	Free Trade	Shoalhaven	1889–1898
Harry Newman	Free Trade	Orange	1891–1904
John Nicholson	Independent Labour	Woronora	1891–1917
Dowell O'Reilly	Ind. Free Trade	Parramatta	1894–1898
Edward O'Sullivan	Protectionist	Queanbeyan	1885–1910
Sir Henry Parkes	Free Trade	St Leonards	1856, 1858, 1859–1861, 1864–1870, 1872–1895
Varney Parkes ^{6}	Free Trade	Canterbury	1885–1888, 1891–1900 1907–1913
John Perry	Protectionist	Ballina	1889–1920
William Piddington	Ind. Free Trade	Uralla-Walcha	1894–1900
Richard Price	Protectionist	Gloucester	1894–1904 1907–1922
Robert Pyers	Ind. Protectionist	Richmond	1894–1904
Thomas Rawlinson	Ind. Protectionist	Bega	1894–1895
George Reid	Free Trade	Sydney-King	1880–1884 1885–1901
William Rigg	Ind. Free Trade	Newtown-St Peters	1894–1901
Thomas Rose	Protectionist	Argyle	1891–1904
Andrew Ross	Protectionist	Molong	1880–1904
William Schey	Independent Labour	Darlington	1887–1898
John See	Protectionist	Grafton	1880–1904
William Shipway	Free Trade	Paddington	1894–1895
Thomas Slattery ^{4}	Protectionist	Boorowa	1880–1885 1887–1895
Richard Sleath	Labour	Wilcannia	1894–1904
George Smailes	Labour	Granville	1894–1898
Sydney Smith	Free Trade	Bathurst	1882–1898 1900
William Stephen	Ind. Free Trade	Botany	1887–1891 1894–1895
Richard Stevenson	Protectionist	Northumberland	1886–1895 1898–1899
David Storey	Free Trade	Randwick	1894–1920
Josiah Thomas	Independent Labour	Alma	1894–1901
Dugald Thomson	Free Trade	Warringah	1894–1901
James Tonkin	Free Trade	Macquarie	1887–1895
Thomas Waddell	Protectionist	Cobar	1887–1917
William Wall	Protectionist	Rylstone	1886–1895
David Watkins	Labour	Wallsend	1894–1901
Chris Watson	Labour	Young	1894–1901
Samuel Whiddon	Free Trade	Sydney-Cook	1894–1904
John Wilkinson	Protectionist	Albury	1889–1895
Bill Wilks	Free Trade	Balmain North	1894–1901
John Willard ^{2}	Labour	Tweed	1894–1895
William Willis	Protectionist	Barwon	1889–1904
Bernhard Wise	Free Trade	Sydney-Flinders	1887–1889 1891–1895 1898–1900
William Wood	Independent Labour	Eden-Bombala	1894–1913
Francis Wright	Protectionist	Glen Innes	1882–1885, 1889–1903
James Young	Free Trade	Manning	1880–1901 1904–1907

By-elections

Under the constitution, ministers were required to resign to recontest their seats in a by-election when appointed. These by-elections are only noted when the minister was defeated; in general, he was elected unopposed.

#	Electorate	Departing Member	Party	Reason for By-election	Date of By-election	Winner of By-election	Party
1	Grenfell	George Greene	Free Trade	Election result voided on appeal (no by-election)	25 October 1894	Michael Loughnane	Labour
2	Tweed	John Willard	Labour	Not a resident of NSW	29 November 1894	Joseph Kelly	Protectionist
3	Willoughby	Joseph Cullen	Free Trade	Financial difficulty	30 November 1894	Edward Clark	Free Trade
4	Boorowa	Thomas Slattery	Protectionist	Resignation	15 January 1895	Kenneth Mackay	Protectionist
5	Bowral	William McCourt	Protectionist	Resignation due to insolvency	19 February 1895	William McCourt	Protectionist
6	Canterbury	Varney Parkes	Free Trade	Resignation due to insolvency	14 June 1895	Varney Parkes	Free Trade

== See also ==
- Reid ministry
- Results of the 1894 New South Wales colonial election
- Candidates of the 1894 New South Wales colonial election
