= Electoral results for the district of Grenfell =

Election results for Grenfell, New South Wales, Australia

Grenfell, an electoral district of the Legislative Assembly in the Australian state of New South Wales was created in 1880 and abolished in 1904.

| Election | Member | Party |
|---|---|---|
| 1880 | Robert Vaughn | None |
| 1882 | Robert Vaughn | None |
| 1885 | Robert Vaughn | None |
| 1887 | Robert Vaughn | Protectionist |
| 1889 | George Greene | Free Trade |
| 1891 | Robert Vaughn | Labor |
| 1894 | George Greene | Free Trade |
| 1894 re-count | Michael Loughnane | Labor |
| 1895 | George Greene | Free Trade |
| 1898 | William Holman | Labor |
| 1901 | William Holman | Labor |

== Election results ==
=== Elections in the 1900s ===
==== 1901 ====
1901 New South Wales state election: Grenfell
| Party | Candidate | Votes | % | ±% |
|---|---|---|---|---|
| Labour | William Holman | 1,299 | 51.7 | −3.9 |
| Liberal Reform | Arthur Grimm | 1,213 | 48.3 | |
| Total formal votes | | 2,512 | 100.0 | +0.4 |
| Informal votes | | 0 | 0.0 | −0.4 |
| Turnout | | 2,512 | 68.9 | 11.3 |
| Labour hold | | | | |

=== Elections in the 1890s ===
==== 1898 ====
1898 New South Wales colonial election: Grenfell
| Party | Candidate | Votes | % | ±% |
|---|---|---|---|---|
| Labour | William Holman | 1,115 | 55.6 | |
| National Federal | Andrew Kelly | 892 | 44.4 | |
| Total formal votes | | 2,007 | 99.6 | |
| Informal votes | | 8 | 0.4 | |
| Turnout | | 2,015 | 57.5 | |
| Labour gain from Ind. Free Trade | | | | |

==== 1895 ====
1895 New South Wales colonial election: Grenfell
| Party | Candidate | Votes | % | ±% |
|---|---|---|---|---|
| Ind. Free Trade | George Greene | 664 | 48.8 | |
| Labour | William Holman | 551 | 40.5 | |
| Protectionist | Robert Vaughn | 146 | 10.7 | |
| Total formal votes | | 1,361 | 99.4 | |
| Informal votes | | 8 | 0.6 | |
| Turnout | | 1,369 | 68.0 | |
| Ind. Free Trade gain from Labour | | | | |

==== 1894 re-count ====
1894 Grenfell election re-count Thursday 25 October
| Party | Candidate | Votes | % | ±% |
|---|---|---|---|---|
| Labour | Michael Loughnane | 525 | 36.3 | +0.3 |
| Free Trade | George Greene | 516 | 35.7 | −0.4 |
| Protectionist | Robert Vaughn | 330 | 22.8 | +0.2 |
| Independent | John Williams | 75 | 5.2 | −0.1 |
| Total formal votes | | 1,446 | 97.0 | −0.7 |
| Informal votes | | 45 (Note: Calculated on the assumption that the total number of votes did not change.) | 3.0 | +0.7 |
| Turnout | | 1,491 | 71.0 | '"`UNIQ−−ref−0000002F−QINU`"' |
| Labour gain from Free Trade | | | | |

The Elections and Qualifications Committee conducted a re-count of the 1894 Grenfell election and declared that George Greene (Free Trade) had not been elected the member for Grenfell. No by-election was conducted, instead the committee declared that Michael Loughnane (Labour) had been elected.

==== 1894 ====
1894 New South Wales colonial election: Grenfell
| Party | Candidate | Votes | % | ±% |
|---|---|---|---|---|
| Free Trade | George Greene | 526 | 36.1 | |
| Labour | Michael Loughnane | 524 | 36.0 | |
| Protectionist | Robert Vaughn | 329 | 22.6 | |
| Independent | John Williams | 77 | 5.3 | |
| Total formal votes | | 1,456 | 97.7 | |
| Informal votes | | 35 | 2.4 | |
| Turnout | | 1,491 | 71.0 | |
| Free Trade gain from Labour | | | | |

The sitting member, Robert Vaughn had been elected as a Labour member at the 1891 election but stood as a Protectionist candidate for this election.

The result was overturned by the Elections and Qualifications Committee which conducted a re-count in October 1894.

==== 1891 ====
1891 New South Wales colonial election: Grenfell Saturday 27 June
| Party | Candidate | Votes | % | ±% |
|---|---|---|---|---|
| Labour | Robert Vaughn (elected) | 593 | 47.1 | |
| Free Trade | George Greene (defeated) | 379 | 30.1 | |
| Free Trade | Thomas Bembrick | 227 | 18.0 | |
| Protectionist | James Gibson | 59 | 4.7 | |
| Total formal votes | | 1,258 | 98.5 | |
| Informal votes | | 19 | 1.5 | |
| Turnout | | 1,277 | 62.2 | |
| Labour gain from Free Trade | | | | |

=== Elections in the 1880s ===
==== 1889 ====
1889 New South Wales colonial election: Grenfell Monday 4 February
| Party | Candidate | Votes | % | ±% |
|---|---|---|---|---|
| Free Trade | George Greene (elected) | 475 | 52.3 | |
| Protectionist | Robert Vaughn | 433 | 47.7 | |
| Total formal votes | | 908 | 98.8 | |
| Informal votes | | 11 | 1.2 | |
| Turnout | | 919 | 52.0 | |
| Free Trade gain from Protectionist | | | | |

==== 1887 ====
1887 New South Wales colonial election: Grenfell Wednesday 16 February
| Party | Candidate | Votes | % | ±% |
|---|---|---|---|---|
| Protectionist | Robert Vaughn (re-elected) | 431 | 53.3 | |
| Free Trade | A L Park | 378 | 46.7 | |
| Total formal votes | | 809 | 98.2 | |
| Informal votes | | 15 | 1.8 | |
| Turnout | | 824 | 51.6 | |

==== 1885 ====
1885 New South Wales colonial election: Grenfell Thursday 22 October
| Candidate | Votes | % |
|---|---|---|
| Robert Vaughn (re-elected) | 387 | 59.3 |
| E Whelan | 266 | 40.7 |
| Total formal votes | 653 | 99.4 |
| Informal votes | 4 | 0.6 |
| Turnout | 714 | 49.0 |

==== 1882 ====
1882 New South Wales colonial election: Grenfell Friday 8 December
| Candidate | Votes | % |
|---|---|---|
| Robert Vaughn (re-elected) | 404 | 58.1 |
| E Whelan | 291 | 41.9 |
| Total formal votes | 695 | 97.9 |
| Informal votes | 15 | 2.1 |
| Turnout | 706 | 45.6 |

==== 1880 ====
1880 New South Wales colonial election: Grenfell Monday 29 November
| Candidate | Votes | % |
|---|---|---|
| Robert Vaughn (elected) | 421 | 49.2 |
| George Greene | 294 | 34.4 |
| J Donkin | 141 | 16.5 |
| Total formal votes | 856 | 98.5 |
| Informal votes | 13 | 1.5 |
| Turnout | 869 | 53.8 |
| | (new seat) | |

Grenfell partly replaced the abolished district of The Lachlan.
