= Results of the 1894 New South Wales colonial election =

Colonial election for New South Wales, Australia in July 1894

New South Wales colonial election, 17 July 1894 Legislative Assembly << 1891–1895 >>
Enrolled voters	255,802				
Votes cast	200,956		Turnout	78.56	+19.48
Informal votes	3,310		Informal	1.62	−0.38
Summary of votes by party
Party	Primary votes	%	Swing	Seats	Change
Free Trade	60,966	30.34	−6.15	50	+6
Protectionist	55,652	27.69	−8.81	37	−15
Labor	33,143	16.49	−4.13	15	−20
Ind. Free Trade	23,324	11.61	+7.91	11	+7
Ind. Protectionist	14,434	7.18	+5.17	4	±0
Independent Labor	11,504	5.72	+5.30	8	+7
Independent	1,933	0.96	−0.71	0	−1
Total	200,956			125	

The 1894 New South Wales colonial election was for 125 electoral districts, with each district returning one member. The election was conducted on the basis of a simple majority or first-past-the-post voting system. There were three significant changes from the 1891 election, the abolition of multi-member constituencies, the abolition of plural voting where an elector had property or residence in more than one electorate and that polls for every district were held on the same day. The number of seats was reduced from 141 to 125. In this election, in 74 electorates the winning candidate received less than 50% of the votes, while 1 was uncontested. The average number of enrolled voters per electorate was 2,046, ranging from Lismore (1,360) to Marrickville (2,924).

== Election results ==
=== Albury ===
1894 New South Wales colonial election: Albury
Party	Candidate	Votes	%	±%
Protectionist	John Wilkinson	842	51.9	
Free Trade	William Hall	782	48.2	
Total formal votes		1,624	99.1	
Informal votes		15	0.9	
Turnout		1,639	85.3	
Protectionist hold				

=== Alma ===
1894 New South Wales colonial election: Alma
Party	Candidate	Votes	%	±%
Labour	Josiah Thomas	1,442	79.0	
Protectionist	Thomas Coombe	313	17.1	
Independent	Charles Pound	71	3.9	
Total formal votes		1,826	98.8	
Informal votes		22	1.2	
Turnout		1,848	89.8	
Labour win		(new seat)		

=== Annandale ===
1894 New South Wales colonial election: Annandale
Party	Candidate	Votes	%	±%
Free Trade	William Mahony	657	35.3	
Labour	Alexander Duncan	527	28.3	
Ind. Protectionist	Thomas Larkin	271	14.6	
Protectionist	John Young	259	13.9	
Ind. Free Trade	William Pritchard	149	8.0	
Total formal votes		1,863	99.1	
Informal votes		17	0.9	
Turnout		1,880	83.7	
Free Trade win		(new seat)		

=== Argyle ===
1894 New South Wales colonial election: Argyle
Party	Candidate	Votes	%	±%
Protectionist	Thomas Rose	859	56.4	
Free Trade	Henry Gannon	665	43.6	
Total formal votes		1,524	98.3	
Informal votes		26	1.7	
Turnout		1,550	78.6	
Protectionist win		(previously 2 members)		

Thomas Rose (Protectionist) was one of two sitting members for Argyle. The second member, William Holborow (Free Trade), did not contest the election.

=== Armidale ===
1894 New South Wales colonial election: Armidale
Party	Candidate	Votes	%	±%
Protectionist	Henry Copeland	820	38.4	
Free Trade	Edmund Lonsdale	684	32.0	
Labour	George Beeby	632	29.6	
Total formal votes		2,136	99.4	
Informal votes		14	0.7	
Turnout		2,150	84.3	
Protectionist win		(new seat)		

Henry Copeland (Protectionist) and Edmund Lonsdale (Free Trade) were sitting members for New England. The third member for New England, James Inglis (Free Trade) did not contest the election.

=== Ashburnham ===
1894 New South Wales colonial election: Ashburnham
Party	Candidate	Votes	%	±%
Independent Labour	Albert Gardiner	577	31.9	
Protectionist	Alfred Stokes	530	29.3	
Ind. Free Trade	George Hutchinson	386	21.3	
Labour	John Hanney	195	10.8	
Ind. Free Trade	Thomas Spencer	121	6.7	
Total formal votes		1,809	97.9	
Informal votes		39	2.1	
Turnout		1,848	83.3	
Independent Labour win		(new seat)		

=== Ashfield ===
1894 New South Wales colonial election: Ashfield
Party	Candidate	Votes	%	±%
Free Trade	Thomas Bavister	1,000	51.4	
Independent	Mark Hammond	867	44.6	
Labour	Robert Thomson	64	3.3	
Ind. Free Trade	Thomas Evans	13	0.7	
Total formal votes		1,944	99.1	
Informal votes		17	0.9	
Turnout		1,961	82.1	
Free Trade win		(new seat)		

=== Ballina ===
1894 New South Wales colonial election: Ballina
Party	Candidate	Votes	%	±%
Protectionist	John Perry	674	56.4	
Labour	Alexander Hill	221	18.5	
Ind. Protectionist	George Martin	201	16.8	
Ind. Protectionist	Siegfried Sohn	81	6.8	
Ind. Protectionist	Samuel Dutton	18	1.5	
Total formal votes		1,195	99.1	
Informal votes		11	0.9	
Turnout		1,206	78.2	
Protectionist win		(new seat)		

=== Balmain North ===
1894 New South Wales colonial election: Balmain North
Party	Candidate	Votes	%	±%
Free Trade	Bill Wilks	999	45.1	
Protectionist	William Murphy	618	27.9	
Labour	Samuel Kirby	340	15.4	
Ind. Free Trade	James Wheeler	258	11.7	
Total formal votes		2,215	99.0	
Informal votes		22	1.0	
Turnout		2,237	84.2	
Free Trade win		(new seat)		

=== Balmain South ===
1894 New South Wales colonial election: Balmain South
Party	Candidate	Votes	%	±%
Labour	Sydney Law	775	34.7	
Protectionist	James Johnston	727	32.5	
Free Trade	George Clubb	716	32.1	
Ind. Free Trade	George Maclean	16	0.7	
Total formal votes		2,234	98.2	
Informal votes		41	1.8	
Turnout		2,275	83.7	
Labour win		(new seat)		

=== The Barwon ===
1894 New South Wales colonial election: The Barwon
Party	Candidate	Votes	%	±%
Protectionist	William Willis	507	40.4	
Independent Labour	Donald Macdonell	505	40.3	
Free Trade	Richard Machattie	104	8.3	
Ind. Free Trade	Langloh Parker	93	7.4	
Labour	Samuel Rosa	43	3.4	
Ind. Protectionist	Pratrick Griffin	2	0.2	
Total formal votes		1,254	98.0	
Informal votes		26	2.0	
Turnout		1,280	78.3	
Protectionist win		(new seat)		

The Barwon consisted of part of Bourke and parts of the abolished districts of The Bogan and The Namoi. William Willis (Protectionist) was one of the members for Bourke.

=== Bathurst ===
1894 New South Wales colonial election: Bathurst
Party	Candidate	Votes	%	±%
Free Trade	Sydney Smith	995	49.7	
Protectionist	Francis Suttor	767	38.3	
Independent Labour	James Walker	241	12.0	
Total formal votes		2,003	99.0	
Informal votes		21	1.0	
Turnout		2,024	84.2	
Free Trade gain from Protectionist				

=== Bega ===
1894 New South Wales colonial election: Bega
Party	Candidate	Votes	%	±%
Ind. Protectionist	Thomas Rawlinson	717	41.3	
Protectionist	James Garvan	616	35.5	
Free Trade	William Neilley	349	20.1	
Ind. Free Trade	Peter Wood	55	3.2	
Total formal votes		1,737	98.5	
Informal votes		27	1.5	
Turnout		1,764	86.9	
Ind. Protectionist win		(new seat)		

=== Bingara ===
1894 New South Wales colonial election: Bingara
Party	Candidate	Votes	%	±%
Free Trade	Samuel Moore	751	50.2	
Protectionist	William Dowel	533	35.6	
Ind. Free Trade	Herbert Clark	111	7.4	
Ind. Free Trade	Robert Buist	96	6.4	
Independent Labour	Thomas Jones	5	0.3	
Total formal votes		1,496	97.0	
Informal votes		47	3.1	
Turnout		1,543	76.4	
Free Trade win		(new seat)		

=== Boorowa ===
1894 New South Wales colonial election: Boorowa
Party	Candidate	Votes	%	±%
Protectionist	Thomas Slattery	773	53.6	
Labour	James Toomey	668	46.4	
Total formal votes		1,441	97.6	
Informal votes		35	2.4	
Turnout		1,476	80.1	
Protectionist hold				

=== Botany ===
1894 New South Wales colonial election: Botany
Party	Candidate	Votes	%	±%
Ind. Free Trade	William Stephen	632	37.9	
Labour	John Dacey	611	36.6	
Ind. Free Trade	James Macfadyen	295	17.7	
Protectionist	Francis Luland	130	7.8	
Total formal votes		1,668	98.5	
Informal votes		26	1.5	
Turnout		1,694	83.4	
Ind. Free Trade win		(new seat)		

=== Bourke ===
1894 New South Wales colonial election: Bourke
Party	Candidate	Votes	%	±%
Free Trade	Edward Millen	469	42.3	
Independent Labour	Hugh Langwell (defeated)	358	32.3	
Protectionist	William Davis	282	25.4	
Total formal votes		1,109	98.7	
Informal votes		15	1.3	
Turnout		1,124	67.1	
Free Trade win		(previously 3 members)		

Bourke was reduced in size and parts were given to the new districts of Cobar and The Barwon. Hugh Langwell (Independent Labour) was one of the members for Bourke. Of the other two members, Thomas Waddell (Protectionist) successfully contested Cobar and William Willis (Protectionist) successfully contested The Barwon.

=== Bowral ===
1894 New South Wales colonial election: Bowral
Party	Candidate	Votes	%	±%
Free Trade	William McCourt	846	56.3	
Protectionist	John Walters	338	22.5	
Ind. Free Trade	William Richards	250	16.6	
Ind. Free Trade	Henry Taylor	68	4.5	
Total formal votes		1,502	99.1	
Informal votes		14	0.9	
Turnout		1,516	81.7	
Free Trade win		(new seat)		

=== Braidwood ===
1894 New South Wales colonial election: Braidwood
Party	Candidate	Votes	%	±%
Protectionist	Austin Chapman	1,192	78.8	
Ind. Free Trade	Alfred Hitchens	279	18.4	
Free Trade	Adolph Shadler	42	2.8	
Total formal votes		1,513	98.9	
Informal votes		17	1.1	
Turnout		1,530	79.0	
Protectionist hold				

=== Broken Hill ===
1894 New South Wales colonial election: Broken Hill
Party	Candidate	Votes	%	±%
Labour	John Cann	1,123	72.6	
Protectionist	Wyman Brown	423	27.4	
Total formal votes		1,546	98.9	
Informal votes		17	1.1	
Turnout		1,563	86.2	
Labour win		(new seat)		

=== Burwood ===
1894 New South Wales colonial election: Burwood
Party	Candidate	Votes	%	±%
Free Trade	William McMillan	932	56.9	
Labour	John Quinnen	340	20.7	
Ind. Free Trade	Griffith Russell-Jones	192	11.7	
Ind. Free Trade	William Dumbrell	82	5.0	
Protectionist	Frederick Gipps	58	3.5	
Ind. Free Trade	Adam Pringle	35	2.1	
Total formal votes		1,639	99.3	
Informal votes		12	0.7	
Turnout		1,651	82.7	
Free Trade win		(new seat)		

=== Camden ===
1894 New South Wales colonial election: Camden
Party	Candidate	Votes	%	±%
Protectionist	John Kidd	869	43.9	
Free Trade	William Cullen (defeated)	644	32.5	
Independent Labour	Edward Griffiths	467	23.6	
Total formal votes		1,980	99.1	
Informal votes		18	0.9	
Turnout		1,998	84.1	
Protectionist win		(previously 3 members)		

=== Canterbury ===
1894 New South Wales colonial election: Canterbury
Party	Candidate	Votes	%	±%
Free Trade	Varney Parkes	1,059	50.2	
Ind. Free Trade	Thomas Taylor	644	30.5	
Labour	James McBean	267	12.7	
Protectionist	Thomas Wearne	140	6.6	
Total formal votes		2,110	98.4	
Informal votes		35	1.6	
Turnout		2,145	80.8	
Free Trade win		(previously 4 members)		

=== The Clarence ===
1894 New South Wales colonial election: The Clarence
Party	Candidate	Votes	%	±%
Protectionist	John McFarlane	1,036	71.2	
Ind. Protectionist	Nathaniel Collins	419	28.8	
Total formal votes		1,455	99.0	
Informal votes		15	1.0	
Turnout		1,470	73.5	
Protectionist hold				

=== Cobar ===
1894 New South Wales colonial election: Cobar
Party	Candidate	Votes	%	±%
Protectionist	Thomas Waddell	615	50.1	
Labour	A Murphy	514	41.9	
Free Trade	Neil Morrison	98	8.0	
Total formal votes		1,227	99.0	
Informal votes		13	1.1	
Turnout		1,240	75.3	
Protectionist win		(new seat)		

Cobar consisted of part of Bourke and parts of the abolished districts of The Bogan and Forbes. Thomas Waddell (Protectionist) was one of the members for Bourke.

=== Condoublin ===
1894 New South Wales colonial election: Condoublin
Party	Candidate	Votes	%	±%
Independent Labour	Thomas Brown	622	48.6	
Protectionist	Patrick Ryan	394	30.8	
Ind. Free Trade	Henry Cooke	254	19.9	
Ind. Protectionist	Thomas Browne	9	0.7	
Total formal votes		1,279	97.4	
Informal votes		34	2.6	
Turnout		1,313	69.7	
Independent Labour win		(new seat)		

=== Coonamble ===
1894 New South Wales colonial election: Coonamble
Party	Candidate	Votes	%	±%
Labour	Hugh Macdonald	780	52.1	
Protectionist	John Hellman	510	34.1	
Ind. Protectionist	John Fisher	206	13.8	
Total formal votes		1,496	98.6	
Informal votes		22	1.5	
Turnout		1,518	74.8	
Labour win		(new seat)		

=== Cowra ===
1894 New South Wales colonial election: Cowra
Party	Candidate	Votes	%	±%
Protectionist	Denis Donnelly	619	43.4	
Labour	Linus Bungate	582	40.8	
Free Trade	Hector Lamond	224	15.7	
Total formal votes		1,425	97.4	
Informal votes		38	2.6	
Turnout		1,463	76.9	
Protectionist win		(new seat)		

=== Darlington ===
1894 New South Wales colonial election: Darlington
Party	Candidate	Votes	%	±%
Independent Labour	William Schey	844	39.1	
Free Trade	William Manuell	771	35.7	
Protectionist	David Davis	544	25.2	
Total formal votes		2,159	98.8	
Informal votes		27	1.2	
Turnout		2,186	85.2	
Independent Labour win		(new seat)		

=== Deniliquin ===
1894 New South Wales colonial election: Deniliquin
Party	Candidate	Votes	%	±%
Protectionist	John Chanter	1,095	70.2	
Free Trade	George Chandler	465	29.8	
Total formal votes		1,560	98.5	
Informal votes		24	1.5	
Turnout		1,584	78.3	
Protectionist win		(new seat)		

=== Dubbo ===
1894 New South Wales colonial election: Dubbo
Party	Candidate	Votes	%	±%
Protectionist	James Morgan	645	40.6	
Free Trade	Simeon Phillips	604	38.0	
Labour	William Wilkinson	341	21.5	
Total formal votes		1,590	98.9	
Informal votes		18	1.1	
Turnout		1,608	78.5	
Protectionist win		(new seat)		

=== Durham ===
1894 New South Wales colonial election: Durham
Party	Candidate	Votes	%	±%
Ind. Free Trade	Herbert Brown	962	59.7	
Ind. Protectionist	John Wade	607	37.7	
Ind. Protectionist	Charles Duffy	42	2.6	
Total formal votes		1,611	98.2	
Informal votes		30	1.8	
Turnout		1,641	76.8	
Member changed to Ind. Free Trade from Free Trade				

=== East Maitland ===
1894 New South Wales colonial election: East Maitland
Party	Candidate	Votes	%	±%
Free Trade	James Brunker	1,001	69.5	
Labour	Peter Curran	439	30.5	
Total formal votes		1,440	99.0	
Informal votes		14	1.0	
Turnout		1,454	81.0	
Free Trade hold				

=== Eden-Bombala ===
1894 New South Wales colonial election: Eden-Bombala
Party	Candidate	Votes	%	±%
Independent Labour	William Wood	334	24.5	
Ind. Protectionist	Coulson Murphy	309	22.6	
Free Trade	David Myers	267	19.6	
Ind. Protectionist	Samuel Woods	181	13.3	
Ind. Protectionist	Edmund Comans	162	11.9	
Independent	Charles Stiles	74	5.4	
Ind. Protectionist	Maurice Roche	20	1.5	
Independent	John O'Reilly	12	0.9	
Independent	Moses Cohen	7	0.5	
Total formal votes		1,366	88.4	
Informal votes		179	11.6	
Turnout		1,545	81.8	
Independent Labour win		(new seat)		

=== Glebe ===
1894 New South Wales colonial election: Glebe
Party	Candidate	Votes	%	±%
Free Trade	James Hogue	786	37.5	
Protectionist	Michael Conlon	438	20.9	
Independent Labour	Thomas Houghton	415	19.8	
Ind. Free Trade	Arthur Eager	248	11.8	
Labour	John Clune	124	5.9	
Ind. Free Trade	William Cary	84	4.0	
Total formal votes		2,095	98.3	
Informal votes		37	1.7	
Turnout		2,132	85.3	
Free Trade win		(previously 2 members)		

=== Glen Innes ===
1894 New South Wales colonial election: Glen Innes
Party	Candidate	Votes	%	±%
Protectionist	Francis Wright	589	44.2	
Protectionist	Alexander Hutchison	508	38.1	
Ind. Protectionist	William Cameron	200	15.0	
Labour	John Souter	37	2.8	
Total formal votes		1,334	98.7	
Informal votes		18	1.3	
Turnout		1,352	77.3	
Protectionist win		(previously 2 members)		

=== Gloucester ===
1894 New South Wales colonial election: Gloucester
Party	Candidate	Votes	%	±%
Protectionist	Richard Price	1,084	59.8	
Free Trade	John Hart	591	32.6	
Ind. Protectionist	Donald McKinnon	109	6.0	
Independent Labour	William Ellingworth	29	1.6	
Total formal votes		1,813	98.9	
Informal votes		20	1.1	
Turnout		1,833	84.7	
Protectionist gain from Free Trade				

=== Goulburn ===
1894 New South Wales colonial election: Goulburn
Party	Candidate	Votes	%	±%
Free Trade	Leslie Hollis	1,115	67.8	
Protectionist	Arthur Barrett	432	26.3	
Ind. Free Trade	Edward Ball	98	6.0	
Total formal votes		1,645	98.9	
Informal votes		19	1.1	
Turnout		1,664	82.5	
Member changed to Free Trade from Labour				

=== Grafton ===
1894 New South Wales colonial election: Grafton
Party	Candidate	Votes	%	±%
Protectionist	John See	994	57.2	
Ind. Protectionist	William Hawthorne	636	36.6	
Ind. Protectionist	Edmund Hockey	109	6.3	
Total formal votes		1,739	99.2	
Informal votes		14	0.8	
Turnout		1,753	83.2	
Protectionist hold				

=== Granville ===
1894 New South Wales colonial election: Granville
Party	Candidate	Votes	%	±%
Labour	George Smailes	715	38.8	
Free Trade	George McCredie	527	28.6	
Ind. Free Trade	John Nobbs	410	22.2	
Protectionist	William Ewart	180	9.8	
Ind. Free Trade	John Ferguson	7	0.4	
Ind. Protectionist	Thomas Castle	5	0.3	
Total formal votes		1,844	98.9	
Informal votes		21	1.1	
Turnout		1,865	84.4	
Labour win		(new seat)		

=== Grenfell ===
1894 New South Wales colonial election: Grenfell
Party	Candidate	Votes	%	±%
Free Trade	George Greene	526	36.1	
Labour	Michael Loughnane	524	36.0	
Protectionist	Robert Vaughn	329	22.6	
Independent	John Williams	77	5.3	
Total formal votes		1,456	97.7	
Informal votes		35	2.4	
Turnout		1,491	71.0	
Free Trade gain from Labour				

The sitting member, Robert Vaughn had been elected as a Labour member at the 1891 election but stood as a Protectionist candidate for this election.

The result was overturned by the Elections and Qualifications Committee which conducted a re-count in October 1894.

=== Gundagai ===
1894 New South Wales colonial election: Gundagai
Party	Candidate	Votes	%	±%
Protectionist	John Barnes	699	46.3	
Independent Labour	Robert McCook	385	25.5	
Free Trade	Frederick Pinkstone	333	22.1	
Ind. Free Trade	Richard Ramsden	92	6.1	
Total formal votes		1,509	96.9	
Informal votes		48	3.1	
Turnout		1,557	77.8	
Protectionist hold				

=== Gunnedah ===
1894 New South Wales colonial election: Gunnedah
Party	Candidate	Votes	%	±%
Labour	John Kirkpatrick	674	54.8	
Protectionist	Job Sheldon	477	38.8	
Ind. Free Trade	Silas Rose	42	3.4	
Ind. Protectionist	George Birney	26	2.1	
Ind. Free Trade	Jonathan Rendalls	10	0.8	
Total formal votes		1,229	97.9	
Informal votes		27	2.2	
Turnout		1,256	66.8	
Labour hold				

=== Hartley ===
1894 New South Wales colonial election: Hartley
Party	Candidate	Votes	%	±%
Independent Labour	Joseph Cook	723	47.0	
Ind. Free Trade	John Hurley	474	30.8	
Protectionist	William Richardson	194	12.6	
Ind. Free Trade	George Donald	130	8.5	
Labour	John Henry	17	1.1	
Total formal votes		1,538	98.6	
Informal votes		22	1.4	
Turnout		1,560	76.8	
Independent Labour win		(previously 2 members)		

=== The Hastings and The Macleay ===
1894 New South Wales colonial election: The Hastings and The Macleay
Party	Candidate	Votes	%	±%
Protectionist	Francis Clarke	668	36.7	
Free Trade	Walter Vivian	556	30.6	
Ind. Protectionist	Otho Dangar	494	27.2	
Ind. Protectionist	Enoch Rudder	61	3.4	
Labour	Henry Stuart	40	2.2	
Total formal votes		1,819	98.6	
Informal votes		26	1.4	
Turnout		1,845	82.4	
Protectionist win		(new seat)		

=== The Hawkesbury ===
|

1894 New South Wales colonial election: The Hawkesbury
Party	Candidate	Votes	%	±%
Ind. Free Trade	William Morgan	1,029	48.4	
Free Trade	Sydney Burdekin	939	44.1	
Labour	Henry Buttsworth	110	5.2	
Protectionist	Thomas Bennett	50	2.4	
Total formal votes		2,128	98.9	
Informal votes		23	1.1	
Turnout		2,151	89.0	
Ind. Free Trade gain from Free Trade				

Sydney Burdekin (Free Trade) was the sitting member for The Hawkesbury.

=== Hay ===
1894 New South Wales colonial election: Hay
Party	Candidate	Votes	%	±%
Free Trade	James Ashton	475	37.8	
Protectionist	James Newton	383	30.5	
Ind. Free Trade	George Mair	219	17.4	
Ind. Protectionist	Allen Lakeman	178	14.2	
Independent	Charles Broom	2	0.2	
Total formal votes		1,257	98.3	
Informal votes		22	1.7	
Turnout		1,279	70.2	
Free Trade win		(new seat)		

=== The Hume ===
1894 New South Wales colonial election: The Hume
Party	Candidate	Votes	%	±%
Protectionist	William Lyne	882	76.1	
Free Trade	Hugh Bridson	277	23.9	
Total formal votes		1,159	97.9	
Informal votes		25	2.1	
Turnout		1,184	71.2	
Protectionist win		(previously 2 members)		

=== Illawarra ===
1894 New South Wales colonial election: Illawarra
Party	Candidate	Votes	%	±%
Free Trade	Archibald Campbell	972	59.8	
Protectionist	Andrew Lysaght Sr.	653	40.2	
Total formal votes		1,625	98.8	
Informal votes		19	1.2	
Turnout		1,644	85.5	
Free Trade win		(previously 2 members)		

Archibald Campbell (Free Trade) was one of two sitting members for Illawarra. The second member, John Nicholson (Labour) successfully contested the election for the new seat of Woronora.

=== Inverell ===
1894 New South Wales colonial election: Inverell
Party	Candidate	Votes	%	±%
Protectionist	George Cruickshank	unopposed		
Protectionist hold				

=== Kahibah ===
1894 New South Wales colonial election: Kahibah
Party	Candidate	Votes	%	±%
Independent Labour	Alfred Edden	1,041	54.7	
Independent	John Penman	364	19.1	
Labour	George Errington	355	18.7	
Ind. Free Trade	William Case	70	3.7	
Independent	William Williams	41	2.2	
Ind. Free Trade	Joseph Gorrick	31	1.6	
Total formal votes		1,902	98.1	
Informal votes		37	1.9	
Turnout		1,939	91.0	
Independent Labour win		(new seat)		

=== Kiama ===
1894 New South Wales colonial election: Kiama
Party	Candidate	Votes	%	±%
Ind. Protectionist	Alexander Campbell	811	50.9	
Free Trade	George Fuller	781	49.1	
Total formal votes		1,592	98.8	
Informal votes		20	1.2	
Turnout		1,612	86.8	
Ind. Protectionist gain from Free Trade				

=== The Lachlan ===
1894 New South Wales colonial election: The Lachlan
Party	Candidate	Votes	%	±%
Ind. Protectionist	James Carroll	452	42.3	
Ind. Protectionist	Alexander Cameron	351	32.9	
Protectionist	John Miller	133	12.5	
Ind. Free Trade	Alexander Huie	119	11.1	
Ind. Free Trade	James Dunsmore	13	1.2	
Total formal votes		1,068	97.8	
Informal votes		24	2.2	
Turnout		1,092	69.3	
Ind. Protectionist win		(new seat)		

=== Leichhardt ===
1894 New South Wales colonial election: Leichhardt
Party	Candidate	Votes	%	±%
Ind. Free Trade	John Hawthorne	826	37.1	
Labour	William Holman	731	32.8	
Free Trade	George Clark	372	16.7	
Ind. Free Trade	Robert Cropley	159	7.1	
Protectionist	Edward Purnell	95	4.3	
Ind. Free Trade	Edward Darnley	34	1.5	
Ind. Protectionist	Aaron Wheeler	11	0.5	
Total formal votes		2,228	99.1	
Informal votes		21	0.9	
Turnout		2,249	83.5	
Ind. Free Trade win		(new seat)		

=== Lismore ===
1894 New South Wales colonial election: Lismore
Party	Candidate	Votes	%	±%
Protectionist	Thomas Ewing	718	76.4	
Independent Labour	James Walker	222	23.6	
Total formal votes		940	99.3	
Informal votes		7	0.7	
Turnout		947	69.6	
Protectionist win		(new seat)		

=== Macquarie ===
1894 New South Wales colonial election: Macquarie
Party	Candidate	Votes	%	±%
Free Trade	James Tonkin	637	38.6	
Protectionist	William Hurley	542	32.9	
Labour	John Skelton	237	14.4	
Ind. Protectionist	John Hughes	174	10.6	
Ind. Free Trade	Henry Brown	60	3.6	
Total formal votes		1,650	98.3	
Informal votes		28	1.7	
Turnout		1,678	74.3	
Free Trade win		(new seat)		

=== Manaro ===
1894 New South Wales colonial election: Manaro
Party	Candidate	Votes	%	±%
Protectionist	Gus Miller	772	48.8	
Ind. Protectionist	Charles Welch	290	18.3	
Free Trade	Granville Ryrie	276	17.4	
Protectionist	Henry Dawson	160	10.1	
Independent	John O'Brien	85	5.4	
Total formal votes		1,583	98.3	
Informal votes		28	1.7	
Turnout		1,611	77.4	
Protectionist win		(previously 2 members)		

=== The Manning ===
1894 New South Wales colonial election: The Manning
Party	Candidate	Votes	%	±%
Free Trade	James Young	870	52.8	
Protectionist	Hugh McKinnon	777	47.2	
Total formal votes		1,647	99.2	
Informal votes		13	0.8	
Turnout		1,660	87.9	
Free Trade win		(new seat)		

=== Marrickville ===
1894 New South Wales colonial election: Marrickville
Party	Candidate	Votes	%	±%
Free Trade	Francis McLean	1,115	47.1	
Labour	Elliot Johnson	622	26.2	
Protectionist	Daniel Gallagher	274	11.6	
Ind. Free Trade	Alexander Scouller	194	8.2	
Ind. Free Trade	Augustus Gross	99	4.2	
Ind. Free Trade	George Leslie	42	1.8	
Ind. Protectionist	Andrew Macauley	24	1.0	
Total formal votes		2,370	98.3	
Informal votes		41	1.7	
Turnout		2,411	82.5	
Free Trade win		(new seat)		

Marrickville was one of four new seats split out of the abolished seat of Newtown, the others being Newtown-Camperdown, Newtown-Erskine and Newtown-St Peters. The four sitting members for members for Newtown contested the other three seats.

=== Molong ===
1894 New South Wales colonial election: Molong
Party	Candidate	Votes	%	±%
Protectionist	Andrew Ross	504	37.4	
Free Trade	Harrington McCulloch	311	23.1	
Ind. Protectionist	William Melville	253	18.8	
Independent Labour	Charles Lauer	247	18.4	
Ind. Protectionist	Arthur Sherwin	20	1.5	
Ind. Protectionist	John Ardill	11	0.8	
Total formal votes		1,346	94.3	
Informal votes		82	5.7	
Turnout		1,428	77.2	
Protectionist hold				

=== Moree ===
1894 New South Wales colonial election: Moree
Party	Candidate	Votes	%	±%
Protectionist	Thomas Hassall	668	55.5	
Independent Labour	L Mouatt	490	40.7	
Ind. Free Trade	J Halse	24	2.0	
Free Trade	T Vyner	21	1.8	
Total formal votes		1,203	98.1	
Informal votes		23	1.9	
Turnout		1,226	76.7	
Protectionist win		(new seat)		

=== Moruya ===
1894 New South Wales colonial election: Moruya
Party	Candidate	Votes	%	±%
Free Trade	William Millard	708	44.4	
Protectionist	Henry Clarke	448	28.1	
Ind. Protectionist	William Boot	339	21.3	
Ind. Protectionist	John Brogan	49	3.1	
Ind. Protectionist	John Roseby	41	2.6	
Ind. Free Trade	Thomas Garrard	10	0.6	
Total formal votes		1,595	98.8	
Informal votes		19	1.2	
Turnout		1,614	83.5	
Free Trade win		(new seat)		

=== Mudgee ===
1894 New South Wales colonial election: Mudgee
Party	Candidate	Votes	%	±%
Free Trade	Robert Jones	1,085	56.8	
Protectionist	Richard Rouse	749	39.2	
Labour	J M Appleyard	65	3.4	
Independent	J Scully	10	0.5	
Ind. Protectionist	W Logan	3	0.2	
Total formal votes		1,912	93.6	
Informal votes		131	6.4	
Turnout		2,043	79.9	
Free Trade win		(previously 3 members)		

=== The Murray ===
1894 New South Wales colonial election: The Murray
Party	Candidate	Votes	%	±%
Protectionist	James Hayes	976	64.3	
Free Trade	William Drummond	543	35.8	
Total formal votes		1,519	98.4	
Informal votes		24	1.6	
Turnout		1,543	74.3	
Protectionist win		(previously 2 members)		

=== The Murrumbidgee ===
1894 New South Wales colonial election: The Murrumbidgee
Party	Candidate	Votes	%	±%
Protectionist	Thomas Fitzpatrick	711	50.1	
Independent Labour	Arthur Rae	704	49.7	
Ind. Protectionist	Thomas Humphreys	3	0.2	
Total formal votes		1,418	97.5	
Informal votes		37	2.5	
Turnout		1,455	70.4	
Protectionist win		(previously 3 members)		

=== Narrabri ===
1894 New South Wales colonial election: Narrabri
Party	Candidate	Votes	%	±%
Free Trade	Charles Collins	672	48.7	
Labour	Hugh Ross	561	40.7	
Ind. Free Trade	Sydney Powell	130	9.4	
Independent	George Gregory	17	1.2	
Total formal votes		1,380	98.2	
Informal votes		26	1.9	
Turnout		1,406	74.1	
Free Trade win		(new seat)		

=== The Nepean ===
1894 New South Wales colonial election: The Nepean
Party	Candidate	Votes	%	±%
Free Trade	Samuel Lees	884	49.4	
Protectionist	Thomas Smith	785	43.9	
Labour	Lewis Litton	121	6.8	
Total formal votes		1,790	99.3	
Informal votes		13	0.7	
Turnout		1,803	87.2	
Free Trade hold				

=== Newcastle East ===
1894 New South Wales colonial election: Newcastle East
Party	Candidate	Votes	%	±%
Free Trade	William Dick	862	53.8	
Protectionist	David Scott	740	46.2	
Total formal votes		1,602	99.0	
Informal votes		16	1.0	
Turnout		1,618	88.7	
Free Trade win		(new seat)		

=== Newcastle West ===
1894 New South Wales colonial election: Newcastle West
Party	Candidate	Votes	%	±%
Free Trade	James Ellis	428	31.5	
Labour	James Thompson	327	24.0	
Ind. Free Trade	James Blanksby	268	19.7	
Protectionist	William Grahame	226	16.6	
Ind. Free Trade	George Webb	112	8.2	
Total formal votes		1,361	99.1	
Informal votes		13	1.0	
Turnout		1,374	89.7	
Free Trade win		(new seat)		

=== Newtown-Camperdown ===
1894 New South Wales colonial election: Newtown-Camperdown
Party	Candidate	Votes	%	±%
Free Trade	Joseph Abbott	852	46.7	
Labour	Benjamin Morgan	554	30.4	
Protectionist	James Smith	355	19.5	
Ind. Free Trade	John Cotton	63	3.5	
Total formal votes		1,824	98.3	
Informal votes		32	1.7	
Turnout		1,856	81.7	
Free Trade win		(new seat)		

Newtown was split into four, Newtown-Camperdown, Newtown-Erskine, Newtown-St Peters and Marrickville. Joseph Abbott (Free Trade) was a sitting members for Newtown, while the other three sitting members contested Newtown-St Peters and Newtown-Erskine.

=== Newtown-Erskine ===
1894 New South Wales colonial election: Newtown-Erskine
Party	Candidate	Votes	%	±%
Free Trade	Edmund Molesworth	747	48.1	
Labour	Robert Hollis	687	44.2	
Ind. Free Trade	John Hindle	106	6.8	
Ind. Protectionist	John Davis	14	0.9	
Total formal votes		1,554	98.9	
Informal votes		18	1.2	
Turnout		1,572	80.2	
Free Trade win		(new seat)		

Newtown was split into four, Newtown-Camperdown, Newtown-Erskine, Newtown-St Peters and Marrickville. Edmund Molesworth (Free Trade) and John Hindle (Labour) were both sitting members for Newtown, while the other two sitting members contested Newtown-Camperdown and Newtown-St Peters.

=== Newtown-St Peters ===
1894 New South Wales colonial election: Newtown-St Peters
Party	Candidate	Votes	%	±%
Ind. Free Trade	William Rigg	870	43.6	
Ind. Free Trade	Francis Cotton	507	25.4	
Labour	Thomas Beasley	462	23.2	
Protectionist	John Bowes	155	7.8	
Total formal votes		1,994	99.3	
Informal votes		14	0.7	
Turnout		2,008	86.0	
Ind. Free Trade win		(new seat)		

Newtown was split into four, Newtown-Camperdown, Newtown-Erskine, Newtown-St Peters and Marrickville. Francis Cotton (Labour) was a sitting member for Newtown. The other three sitting members for Newtown contested Newtown-Camperdown and Newtown-Erskine. William Rigg (Independent Free Trade) was the Mayor of Newtown. John Bowes (Protectionist) was the sitting member for the abolished seat of Morpeth.

=== Northumberland ===
1894 New South Wales colonial election: Northumberland
Party	Candidate	Votes	%	±%
Protectionist	Richard Stevenson	670	45.2	
Free Trade	Henry Wheeler	623	42.0	
Labour	James Donnelly	191	12.9	
Total formal votes		1,484	99.4	
Informal votes		9	0.6	
Turnout		1,493	78.5	
Protectionist win		(previously 3 members)		

=== Orange ===
1894 New South Wales colonial election: Orange
Party	Candidate	Votes	%	±%
Free Trade	Harry Newman	1,203	61.1	
Protectionist	Valentine Heaton	711	36.1	
Ind. Free Trade	Otto Jaeger	56	2.8	
Total formal votes		1,970	98.3	
Informal votes		34	1.7	
Turnout		2,004	82.8	
Free Trade win		(previously 2 members)		

=== Paddington ===
1894 New South Wales colonial election: Paddington
Party	Candidate	Votes	%	±%
Free Trade	William Shipway	731	36.7	
Protectionist	John White	420	21.1	
Ind. Free Trade	Thomas West	390	19.6	
Labour	Stephen Byrne	309	15.5	
Ind. Free Trade	James Dillon	77	3.9	
Ind. Protectionist	Roger Kirby	38	1.9	
Ind. Free Trade	Maitland Whysall	15	0.8	
Ind. Protectionist	John Robinson	7	0.4	
Ind. Free Trade	Alfred Godfrey	4	0.2	
Ind. Free Trade	William Cowper	2	0.1	
Total formal votes		1,993	97.7	
Informal votes		48	2.4	
Turnout		2,041	81.4	
Free Trade win		(previously 4 members)		

=== Parramatta ===
1894 New South Wales colonial election: Parramatta
Party	Candidate	Votes	%	±%
Ind. Free Trade	Dowell O'Reilly	664	36.6	
Free Trade	Hugh Taylor	627	34.6	−6.6
Protectionist	William Ferris	520	28.7	−1.7
Ind. Free Trade	William Garrett	2	0.1	
Ind. Free Trade	James Thomas	1	0.1	
Total formal votes		1,814	98.9	+0.3
Informal votes		21	1.1	−0.3
Turnout		1,835	84.2	+8.69
Ind. Free Trade gain from Free Trade				

Hugh Taylor (Free Trade) was the sitting member for Parramatta.

=== Petersham ===
1894 New South Wales colonial election: Petersham
Party	Candidate	Votes	%	±%
Ind. Free Trade	Llewellyn Jones	627	34.4	
Free Trade	Benjamin Short	386	21.2	
Labour	William Webster	342	18.8	
Ind. Free Trade	Cornelius Danahey	258	14.2	
Protectionist	William Robson	174	9.6	
Independent	John Gelding	16	0.9	
Ind. Free Trade	George Withers	11	0.6	
Ind. Free Trade	John Bell	7	0.4	
Total formal votes		1,821	99.7	
Informal votes		6	0.3	
Turnout		1,827	83.9	
Ind. Free Trade win		(new seat)		

=== Queanbeyan ===
1894 New South Wales colonial election: Queanbeyan
Party	Candidate	Votes	%	±%
Protectionist	Edward O'Sullivan	718	50.7	
Free Trade	Alfred Conroy	443	31.3	
Independent Labour	James McInerney	254	18.0	
Total formal votes		1,415	99.1	
Informal votes		13	0.9	
Turnout		1,428	79.7	
Protectionist hold				

=== Quirindi ===
1894 New South Wales colonial election: Quirindi
Party	Candidate	Votes	%	±%
Protectionist	Robert Levien	635	47.9	
Labour	Ramsay McKillop	420	31.7	
Ind. Protectionist	W Hawker	220	16.6	
Free Trade	A J C Agassiz	33	2.5	
Ind. Free Trade	T S Grehan	17	1.3	
Total formal votes		1,325	92.9	
Informal votes		101	7.1	
Turnout		1,426	88.1	
Protectionist win		(new seat)		

=== Raleigh ===
1894 New South Wales colonial election: Raleigh
Party	Candidate	Votes	%	±%
Protectionist	Patrick Hogan	399	27.8	
Ind. Protectionist	John McLaughlin	379	26.5	
Ind. Protectionist	John Lynn	253	17.7	
Independent Labour	James Gregg	230	16.1	
Independent	Eugene Rudder	83	5.8	
Ind. Protectionist	William Pullen	66	4.6	
Free Trade	Joseph McKay	23	1.6	
Total formal votes		1,433	98.7	
Informal votes		19	1.3	
Turnout		1,452	81.3	
Protectionist win		(new seat)		

=== Randwick ===
1894 New South Wales colonial election: Randwick
Party	Candidate	Votes	%	±%
Free Trade	David Storey	825	40.9	
Protectionist	Edmund Barton	486	24.1	
Labour	George Stevenson	333	16.5	
Ind. Protectionist	Michael Kinnane	302	15.0	
Ind. Free Trade	Richard Colonna-Close	71	3.5	
Total formal votes		2,017	99.2	
Informal votes		16	0.8	
Turnout		2,033	84.2	
Free Trade win		(new seat)		

=== Redfern ===
1894 New South Wales colonial election: Redfern
Party	Candidate	Votes	%	±%
Labour	James McGowen	800	37.1	
Protectionist	Henry Hoyle	590	27.4	
Free Trade	Samuel Bradley	497	23.1	
Ind. Free Trade	William Coombes	144	6.7	
Ind. Free Trade	William Poole	124	5.8	
Total formal votes		2,155	99.0	
Informal votes		22	1.0	
Turnout		2,177	84.6	
Labour win		(previously 4 members)		

=== The Richmond ===
1894 New South Wales colonial election: The Richmond
Party	Candidate	Votes	%	±%
Ind. Protectionist	Robert Pyers	612	46.2	
Ind. Protectionist	Robert Page	309	23.3	
Ind. Protectionist	Allan Cameron	300	22.7	
Ind. Protectionist	James Stock	79	6.0	
Ind. Protectionist	Samuel Northcote	24	1.8	
Total formal votes		1,324	98.7	
Informal votes		17	1.3	
Turnout		1,341	80.5	
Ind. Protectionist win		(previously 3 members)		

=== Robertson ===
1894 New South Wales colonial election: Robertson
Party	Candidate	Votes	%	±%
Protectionist	Robert Fitzgerald	903	46.6	
Free Trade	Edwin Tucker	900	46.4	
Ind. Protectionist	Michael Hickey	137	7.1	
Total formal votes		1,940	97.9	
Informal votes		41	2.1	
Turnout		1,981	77.1	
Protectionist win		(new seat)		

=== Ryde ===
1894 New South Wales colonial election: Ryde
Party	Candidate	Votes	%	±%
Free Trade	Frank Farnell	927	54.8	
Ind. Free Trade	Edward Terry	370	21.9	
Independent Labour	John Lennon	216	12.8	
Ind. Free Trade	John Forsythe	137	8.1	
Independent Labour	John Rees	43	2.5	
Total formal votes		1,693	99.0	
Informal votes		17	1.0	
Turnout		1,710	78.4	
Free Trade win		(new seat)		

=== Rylstone ===
1894 New South Wales colonial election: Rylstone
Party	Candidate	Votes	%	±%
Protectionist	William Wall	677	50.7	
Ind. Protectionist	James Granter	211	15.8	
Labour	Francis Gilbert	210	15.7	
Free Trade	J Hill	100	7.5	
Independent	Thomas Hungerford	68	5.1	
Ind. Free Trade	James Purser	57	4.3	
Ind. Free Trade	James Taylor	13	1.0	
Total formal votes		1,336	97.3	
Informal votes		37	2.7	
Turnout		1,373	72.3	
Protectionist win		(new seat)		

=== St George ===
1894 New South Wales colonial election: St George
Party	Candidate	Votes	%	±%
Free Trade	Joseph Carruthers	1,523	71.6	
Labour	Denis Acton	604	28.4	
Total formal votes		2,127	98.4	
Informal votes		34	1.6	
Turnout		2,161	80.5	
Free Trade win		(new seat)		

=== St Leonards ===
1894 New South Wales colonial election: St Leonards
Party	Candidate	Votes	%	±%
Free Trade	Sir Henry Parkes	1,028	50.8	
Ind. Free Trade	Edward Clark	825	40.8	
Protectionist	Francis Punch	159	7.9	
Ind. Free Trade	William Stoddart	8	0.4	
Ind. Free Trade	James Ford	2	0.1	
Total formal votes		2,022	99.3	
Informal votes		15	0.7	
Turnout		2,037	83.9	
Free Trade win		(previously 3 members)		

=== Sherbrooke ===
1894 New South Wales colonial election: Sherbrooke
Party	Candidate	Votes	%	±%
Free Trade	Jacob Garrard	601	45.0	
Ind. Free Trade	Samuel Bursill	231	17.3	
Ind. Free Trade	John Fitzpatrick	151	11.3	
Labour	James Williamson	95	7.1	
Protectionist	Ambrose Hallen	78	5.8	
Ind. Free Trade	William Bladon	63	4.7	
Ind. Free Trade	Edward Wakely	61	4.6	
Ind. Protectionist	James Tamsett	45	3.4	
Ind. Free Trade	Henry Pigott	8	0.6	
Ind. Free Trade	Donald Campbell	3	0.2	
Total formal votes		1,336	97.3	
Informal votes		37	2.7	
Turnout		1,373	76.2	
Free Trade win		(new seat)		

=== The Shoalhaven ===
1894 New South Wales colonial election: The Shoalhaven
Party	Candidate	Votes	%	±%
Free Trade	Philip Morton	690	42.0	
Ind. Free Trade	William Kennedy	495	30.1	
Protectionist	John McLean	339	20.6	
Ind. Protectionist	George Sinclair	121	7.4	
Total formal votes		1,645	98.9	
Informal votes		18	1.1	
Turnout		1,663	83.7	
Free Trade hold				

=== Singleton ===
1894 New South Wales colonial election: Singleton
Party	Candidate	Votes	%	±%
Free Trade	Albert Gould	882	46.6	
Protectionist	John Connelly	603	31.8	
Labour	William Burnett	409	21.6	
Total formal votes		1,894	98.9	
Informal votes		22	1.2	
Turnout		1,916	81.2	
Free Trade win		(new seat)		

=== Sturt ===
1894 New South Wales colonial election: Sturt
Party	Candidate	Votes	%	±%
Labour	William Ferguson	1,065	73.1	
Ind. Protectionist	John Souter	393	27.0	
Total formal votes		1,458	98.5	
Informal votes		23	1.6	
Turnout		1,481	85.1	
Labour hold				

=== Sydney-Belmore ===
1894 New South Wales colonial election: Sydney-Belmore
Party	Candidate	Votes	%	±%
Free Trade	James Graham	448	28.9	
Ind. Protectionist	Francis Freehill	368	23.7	
Labour	Thomas Tytherleigh	333	21.4	
Ind. Free Trade	Edward Foxall	168	10.8	
Protectionist	Robert Mackay	121	7.8	
Ind. Protectionist	Joseph Purcell	67	4.3	
Ind. Protectionist	William Court	29	1.9	
Ind. Protectionist	George Perry	15	1.0	
Ind. Protectionist	Thomas Murray	4	0.3	
Total formal votes		1,553	97.9	
Informal votes		33	2.1	
Turnout		1,586	83.3	
Free Trade win		(new seat)		

=== Sydney-Bligh ===
1894 New South Wales colonial election: Sydney-Bligh
Party	Candidate	Votes	%	±%
Free Trade	James Martin	609	39.8	
Labour	James Hendry	369	24.1	
Protectionist	James Murphy	265	17.3	
Ind. Free Trade	Unni Carpenter	218	14.3	
Ind. Protectionist	Patrick Hourigan	57	3.7	
Ind. Protectionist	Edward McConville	12	0.8	
Total formal votes		1,530	99.2	
Informal votes		12	0.8	
Turnout		1,542	79.8	
Free Trade win		(new seat)		

=== Sydney-Cook ===
1894 New South Wales colonial election: Sydney-Cook
Party	Candidate	Votes	%	±%
Free Trade	Samuel Whiddon	649	46.4	
Protectionist	William Traill	473	33.8	
Labour	James Watson	276	19.7	
Total formal votes		1,398	99.4	
Informal votes		8	0.6	
Turnout		1,406	81.3	
Free Trade win		(new seat)		

=== Sydney-Denison ===
1894 New South Wales colonial election: Sydney-Denison
Party	Candidate	Votes	%	±%
Free Trade	Matthew Harris	590	42.5	
Protectionist	Andrew Kelly	417	30.0	
Labour	Andrew Thompson	208	15.0	
Ind. Free Trade	Henry Willis	141	10.2	
Ind. Protectionist	Walter Dorman	33	2.4	
Total formal votes		1,389	98.5	
Informal votes		21	1.5	
Turnout		1,410	79.8	
Free Trade win		(new seat)		

=== Sydney-Fitzroy ===
1894 New South Wales colonial election: Sydney-Fitzroy
Party	Candidate	Votes	%	±%
Free Trade	Henry Chapman	666	39.5	
Ind. Free Trade	John McElhone	422	25.0	
Labour	Henry Cato	355	21.1	
Ind. Free Trade	William Morrison	180	10.7	
Ind. Protectionist	Henry Foran	32	1.9	
Ind. Protectionist	Charles Forssberg	17	1.0	
Ind. Protectionist	Robert Roberts	13	0.8	
Total formal votes		1,685	98.7	
Informal votes		23	1.4	
Turnout		1,708	77.2	
Free Trade win		(new seat)		

=== Sydney-Flinders ===
1894 New South Wales colonial election: Sydney-Flinders
Party	Candidate	Votes	%	±%
Free Trade	Bernhard Wise	656	45.8	
Labour	John Dobbie	379	26.5	
Protectionist	William Kippax	286	20.0	
Ind. Free Trade	Joseph Olliffe	77	5.4	
Ind. Protectionist	Leighton Kesteven	34	2.4	
Total formal votes		1,432	98.7	
Informal votes		19	1.3	
Turnout		1,451	79.0	
Free Trade win		(new seat)		

=== Sydney-Gipps ===
1894 New South Wales colonial election: Sydney-Gipps
Party	Candidate	Votes	%	±%
Independent Labour	George Black	915	55.2	
Free Trade	Daniel O'Connor	742	44.8	
Total formal votes		1,657	99.1	
Informal votes		15	0.9	
Turnout		1,672	78.4	
Independent Labour win		(new seat)		

=== Sydney-King ===
1894 New South Wales colonial election: Sydney-King
Party	Candidate	Votes	%	±%
Free Trade	George Reid	819	60.9	
Labour	George Reeve	347	25.8	
Protectionist	John Gannon	164	12.2	
Ind. Free Trade	Ivan Henry	12	0.9	
Ind. Free Trade	William Maguire	4	0.3	
Total formal votes		1,346	98.4	
Informal votes		22	1.6	
Turnout		1,368	72.3	
Free Trade win		(new seat)		

=== Sydney-Lang ===
1894 New South Wales colonial election: Sydney-Lang
Party	Candidate	Votes	%	±%
Labour	Billy Hughes	533	42.3	
Free Trade	John Taylor	428	33.9	
Protectionist	Jack FitzGerald	273	21.7	
Ind. Free Trade	John Butler	27	2.1	
Total formal votes		1,261	97.2	
Informal votes		37	2.9	
Turnout		1,298	74.8	
Labour win		(new seat)		

=== Sydney-Phillip ===
1894 New South Wales colonial election: Sydney-Phillip
Party	Candidate	Votes	%	±%
Free Trade	Robert Fowler	635	41.5	
Protectionist	William Manning	518	33.8	
Labour	James Wilson	364	23.8	
Ind. Free Trade	Charles Renshaw	15	1.0	
Total formal votes		1,532	98.5	
Informal votes		24	1.5	
Turnout		1,556	78.6	
Free Trade win		(new seat)		

=== Sydney-Pyrmont ===
1894 New South Wales colonial election: Sydney-Pyrmont
Party	Candidate	Votes	%	±%
Labour	Thomas Davis	716	52.2	
Free Trade	John Carter	394	28.7	
Ind. Protectionist	Cyrus Fuller	197	14.4	
Ind. Free Trade	George Landers	64	4.7	
Total formal votes		1,371	98.6	
Informal votes		19	1.4	
Turnout		1,390	80.4	
Labour win		(new seat)		

=== Tamworth ===
1894 New South Wales colonial election: Tamworth
Party	Candidate	Votes	%	±%
Protectionist	George Dibbs	612	43.2	
Free Trade	Albert Piddington	492	34.8	
Independent Labour	Raymond Walsh	277	19.6	
Ind. Protectionist	James Toohey	35	2.5	
Total formal votes		1,416	99.2	
Informal votes		12	0.8	
Turnout		1,428	83.1	
Protectionist win		(previously 2 members)		

=== Tenterfield ===
1894 New South Wales colonial election: Tenterfield
Party	Candidate	Votes	%	±%
Free Trade	Charles Lee	729	51.9	
Labour	John Coxall	660	47.0	
Protectionist	Henry Campbell	16	1.1	
Total formal votes		1,405	98.3	
Informal votes		25	1.8	
Turnout		1,430	82.2	
Free Trade hold				

=== Tumut ===
1894 New South Wales colonial election: Tumut
Party	Candidate	Votes	%	±%
Protectionist	Travers Jones	616	44.8	
Free Trade	Edward Brown	332	24.2	
Independent Labour	Robert Joyce	236	17.2	
Ind. Protectionist	John Downing	153	11.1	
Ind. Protectionist	John Cheney	37	2.7	
Total formal votes		1,374	97.9	
Informal votes		29	2.1	
Turnout		1,403	77.1	
Protectionist gain from Free Trade				

=== The Tweed ===
1894 New South Wales colonial election: The Tweed
Party	Candidate	Votes	%	±%
Labour	John Willard	431	29.7	
Ind. Protectionist	Joseph Kelly	387	26.7	
Protectionist	Bruce Nicoll	218	15.0	
Ind. Protectionist	George Halliday	178	12.3	
Free Trade	William Baker	97	6.7	
Ind. Protectionist	John Marks	86	5.9	
Ind. Protectionist	David Jarman	52	3.6	
Ind. Free Trade	James Barrie	1	0.1	
Independent	Patrick Gilroy	1	0.1	
Ind. Protectionist	James Murphy	0	0.0	
Total formal votes		1,451	97.1	
Informal votes		43	2.9	
Turnout		1,494	83.5	
Labour win		(new seat)		

=== Uralla-Walcha ===
1894 New South Wales colonial election: Uralla-Walcha
Party	Candidate	Votes	%	±%
Ind. Free Trade	William Piddington	431	35.8	
Protectionist	Patrick O'Connor	349	29.0	
Free Trade	James Leece	232	19.3	
Ind. Protectionist	Charles Givney	74	6.2	
Independent	John Gardiner	50	4.2	
Independent	John Campbell	46	3.8	
Independent Labour	Hugh Healy	14	1.2	
Ind. Free Trade	Edmund Moberly	7	0.6	
Total formal votes		1,203	97.2	
Informal votes		35	2.8	
Turnout		1,238	73.1	
Ind. Free Trade win		(new seat)		

=== Wagga Wagga ===
1894 New South Wales colonial election: Wagga Wagga
Party	Candidate	Votes	%	±%
Protectionist	James Gormly	933	77.3	
Independent Labour	James McDarra	274	22.7	
Total formal votes		1,207	98.9	
Informal votes		13	1.1	
Turnout		1,220	68.0	
Protectionist win		(new seat)		

=== Wallsend ===
1894 New South Wales colonial election: Wallsend
Party	Candidate	Votes	%	±%
Labour	David Watkins	908	51.4	
Protectionist	Thomas Walker	470	26.6	
Ind. Protectionist	Oswald Steel	335	19.0	
Free Trade	Albert Card	45	2.6	
Independent	Alfred Deering	8	0.5	
Total formal votes		1,766	98.8	
Informal votes		21	1.2	
Turnout		1,787	88.6	
Labour win		(new seat)		

=== Waratah ===
1894 New South Wales colonial election: Waratah
Party	Candidate	Votes	%	±%
Labour	Arthur Griffith	820	44.2	
Protectionist	Ninian Melville	680	36.6	
Free Trade	Alfred Clapin	356	19.2	
Total formal votes		1,856	99.3	
Informal votes		13	0.7	
Turnout		1,869	87.9	
Labour win		(new seat)		

=== Warringah ===
1894 New South Wales colonial election: Warringah
Party	Candidate	Votes	%	±%
Free Trade	Dugald Thomson	579	40.5	
Ind. Free Trade	Henry Moss	532	37.2	
Ind. Free Trade	Leonard Dodds	210	14.7	
Labour	Jonathan Lepherd	108	7.6	
Total formal votes		1,429	98.9	
Informal votes		16	1.1	
Turnout		1,445	82.5	
Free Trade win		(new seat)		

=== Waterloo ===
1894 New South Wales colonial election: Waterloo
Party	Candidate	Votes	%	±%
Ind. Free Trade	George Anderson	777	37.6	
Labour	Ernest Banner	724	35.0	
Protectionist	William Sharp	258	12.5	
Free Trade	George Taylor	185	8.9	
Ind. Protectionist	John Navin	125	6.0	
Total formal votes		2,069	99.2	
Informal votes		17	0.8	
Turnout		2,086	86.8	
Ind. Free Trade win		(new seat)		

=== Waverley ===
1894 New South Wales colonial election: Waverley
Party	Candidate	Votes	%	±%
Free Trade	Angus Cameron	747	40.5	
Protectionist	Thomas Barlow	475	25.8	
Ind. Free Trade	Alfred Allen	369	20.0	
Labour	Thomas Kemp	245	13.3	
Ind. Protectionist	James Carroll	9	0.5	
Total formal votes		1,845	99.3	
Informal votes		13	0.7	
Turnout		1,858	81.7	
Free Trade win		(new seat)		

=== Wellington ===
1894 New South Wales colonial election: Wellington
Party	Candidate	Votes	%	±%
Free Trade	John Haynes	831	40.8	
Labour	Michael O'Halloran	607	29.8	
Protectionist	Thomas York	580	28.5	
Ind. Protectionist	H Boehme	20	1.0	
Total formal votes		2,038	98.0	
Informal votes		41	2.0	
Turnout		2,079	80.0	
Free Trade gain from Protectionist				

=== Wentworth ===
1894 New South Wales colonial election: Wentworth
Party	Candidate	Votes	%	±%
Protectionist	Sir Joseph Abbott	476	55.4	
Labour	Robert Scobie (b 1848)	383	44.6	
Total formal votes		859	97.4	
Informal votes		23	2.6	
Turnout		882	58.5	
Member changed to Protectionist from Independent				

Joseph Palmer Abbott had been appointed as Speaker in 1890, was listed as an independent and elected unopposed. While he retained the role of Speaker he was opposed for this election and stood as a Protectionist.

=== West Macquarie ===
1894 New South Wales colonial election: West Macquarie
Party	Candidate	Votes	%	±%
Protectionist	Paddy Crick	820	45.7	
Free Trade	R W Peacock	472	26.3	
Labour	John Bridgeman	259	14.5	
Ind. Free Trade	Charles Jeanneret	208	11.6	
Independent	J O'Donoghue	34	1.9	
Total formal votes		1,793	95.9	
Informal votes		76	4.1	
Turnout		1,869	71.6	
Protectionist win		(new seat)		

=== West Maitland ===
1894 New South Wales colonial election: West Maitland
Party	Candidate	Votes	%	±%
Ind. Free Trade	John Gillies	1,247	63.9	
Free Trade	Robert Scobie (b 1831)	618	31.6	
Independent Labour	Richard Proctor	81	4.2	
Ind. Protectionist	Arthur Payne	7	0.4	
Total formal votes		1,953	98.4	
Informal votes		32	1.6	
Turnout		1,985	83.2	
Member changed to Ind. Free Trade from Free Trade				

=== Wickham ===
1894 New South Wales colonial election: Wickham
Party	Candidate	Votes	%	±%
Free Trade	John Fegan	743	45.4	
Labour	James Dick	338	20.7	
Protectionist	John Gilbert	279	17.0	
Ind. Protectionist	Joseph Barclay	233	14.2	
Ind. Free Trade	Peter Bennett	32	2.0	
Ind. Free Trade	William Hestelow	12	0.7	
Total formal votes		1,637	98.4	
Informal votes		26	1.6	
Turnout		1,663	89.7	
Free Trade win		(new seat)		

=== Wilcannia ===
1894 New South Wales colonial election: Wilcannia
Party	Candidate	Votes	%	±%
Labour	Richard Sleath	971	67.7	
Protectionist	Edward Dickens	463	32.3	
Total formal votes		1,434	98.3	
Informal votes		25	1.7	
Turnout		1,459	77.8	
Labour gain from Protectionist				

=== Willoughby ===
1894 New South Wales colonial election: Willoughby
Party	Candidate	Votes	%	±%
Free Trade	Joseph Cullen	748	39.4	
Protectionist	Francis Coffee	491	25.9	
Ind. Free Trade	George Howarth	432	22.8	
Labour	Thomas Harper	127	6.7	
Ind. Free Trade	John Burns	86	4.5	
Ind. Protectionist	Robert Moodie	9	0.5	
Ind. Protectionist	George Davies	6	0.3	
Total formal votes		1,899	98.7	
Informal votes		25	1.3	
Turnout		1,924	81.0	
Free Trade win		(new seat)		

=== Woollahra ===
1894 New South Wales colonial election: Woollahra
Party	Candidate	Votes	%	±%
Ind. Free Trade	Adrian Knox	885	50.4	
Free Trade	John Neild	538	30.6	
Labour	Philip Moses	334	19.0	
Total formal votes		1,757	99.9	
Informal votes		1	0.1	
Turnout		1,758	83.4	
Ind. Free Trade win		(new seat)		

=== Woronora ===
1894 New South Wales colonial election: Woronora
Party	Candidate	Votes	%	±%
Independent Labour	John Nicholson	755	44.7	
Free Trade	Thomas Bissell	643	38.1	
Ind. Free Trade	Joseph Mitchell	223	13.2	
Ind. Protectionist	Thomas Riley	63	3.7	
Ind. Free Trade	Robert Lindsley	5	0.3	
Total formal votes		1,689	99.0	
Informal votes		17	1.0	
Turnout		1,706	86.9	
Independent Labour win		(new seat)		

=== Yass ===
1894 New South Wales colonial election: Yass
Party	Candidate	Votes	%	±%
Free Trade	William Affleck	516	39.8	
Protectionist	Thomas Colls	440	33.9	
Ind. Protectionist	Argyle McCallum	342	26.4	
Total formal votes		1,298	99.2	
Informal votes		10	0.8	
Turnout		1,308	72.4	
Free Trade gain from Protectionist				

Yass Plains was renamed Yass. Thomas Colls (Protectionist) was the sitting member for Yass Plains.

=== Young ===
1894 New South Wales colonial election: Young
Party	Candidate	Votes	%	±%
Labour	Chris Watson	703	44.6	
Protectionist	John Gough (defeated)	401	25.4	
Protectionist	James Mackinnon (defeated)	400	25.4	
Ind. Free Trade	William Lewis	74	4.7	
Total formal votes		1,578	98.6	
Informal votes		23	1.4	
Turnout		1,601	68.8	
Labour hold		(previously 2 members)		

Both John Gough and James Mackinnon had been elected as Labour candidates, however they refused to sign the pledge.

== See also ==
- Candidates of the 1894 New South Wales colonial election
- Members of the New South Wales Legislative Assembly, 1894–1895
