= Electoral results for the district of Tweed =

Election results for Tweed, New South Wales, Australia

Tweed, an electoral district of the Legislative Assembly in the Australian state of New South Wales, has had two incarnations, the first from 1894 to 1904, the second from 1999 until the present.

== Members ==
First incarnation (1894–1904)
Election	Member	Party
1894	John Willard	Labor
1894 by	Joseph Kelly	Protectionist
1895	Joseph Kelly	Protectionist
1898	Richard Meagher	Independent
1901	Richard Meagher	Independent
Second incarnation (1999–present)
Election	Member	Party
1999	Neville Newell	Labor
2003	Neville Newell	Labor
2007	Geoff Provest	National
2011	Geoff Provest	National
2015	Geoff Provest	National
2019	Geoff Provest	National

== Election results ==
=== Elections in the 2020s ===
==== 2023 ====
2023 New South Wales state election: Tweed
Party	Candidate	Votes	%	±%
National	Geoff Provest	20,494	43.89	−3.66
Labor	Craig Elliot	14,425	30.90	−0.07
Greens	Ciara Denham	5,517	11.82	−2.03
Legalise Cannabis	Marc Selan	2,534	5.43	+5.43
Sustainable Australia	Ronald McDonald	2,298	4.92	+1.11
Animal Justice	Susie Hearder	1,422	3.05	−0.79
Total formal votes		46,690	96.33	+0.32
Informal votes		1,777	3.67	−0.32
Turnout		48,467	84.08	−1.27
Two-party-preferred result
National	Geoff Provest	22,075	53.58	−1.39
Labor	Craig Elliot	19,125	46.42	+1.39
National hold		Swing	−1.39	

=== Elections in the 2010s ===
==== 2019 ====
2019 New South Wales state election: Tweed
Party	Candidate	Votes	%	±%
National	Geoff Provest	22,185	47.55	+0.48
Labor	Craig Elliot	14,449	30.97	−4.94
Greens	Bill Fenelon	6,461	13.85	+0.58
Animal Justice	Susie Hearder	1,790	3.84	+3.84
Sustainable Australia	Ronald McDonald	1,776	3.81	+3.81
Total formal votes		46,661	96.01	−0.56
Informal votes		1,937	3.99	+0.56
Turnout		48,598	85.35	−0.20
Two-party-preferred result
National	Geoff Provest	23,243	54.97	+1.78
Labor	Craig Elliot	19,040	45.03	−1.78
National hold		Swing	+1.78	

==== 2015 ====
2015 New South Wales state election: Tweed
Party	Candidate	Votes	%	±%
National	Geoff Provest	20,800	47.1	−15.0
Labor	Ron Goodman	15,867	35.9	+14.5
Greens	Andrea Vickers	5,864	13.3	−0.8
No Land Tax	Kerrie Collins	1,042	2.4	+2.4
Christian Democrats	Michael Sichel	618	1.4	−1.1
Total formal votes		44,191	96.6	+0.4
Informal votes		1,569	3.4	−0.4
Turnout		45,760	85.5	+1.0
Two-party-preferred result
National	Geoff Provest	21,508	53.2	−18.5
Labor	Ron Goodman	18,931	46.8	+18.5
National hold		Swing	−18.5	

==== 2011 ====
2011 New South Wales state election: Tweed
Party	Candidate	Votes	%	±%
National	Geoff Provest	25,416	62.1	+15.9
Labor	Reece Byrnes	8,750	21.4	−17.2
Greens	Andrea Vickers	5,748	14.0	+6.3
Christian Democrats	Corinne Pennay	1,021	2.5	+2.5
Total formal votes		40,935	96.7	−1.0
Informal votes		1,395	3.3	+1.0
Turnout		42,330	86.6	
Two-party-preferred result
National	Geoff Provest	26,389	71.7	+18.7
Labor	Reece Byrnes	10,432	28.3	−18.7
National hold		Swing	+18.7	

=== Elections in the 2000s ===
==== 2007 ====
2007 New South Wales state election: Tweed
Party	Candidate	Votes	%	±%
National	Geoff Provest	18,585	46.2	+4.6
Labor	Neville Newell	15,531	38.6	−7.1
Greens	Tom Tabart	3,116	7.7	+0.2
Independent	Gavin Lawrie	1,225	3.0	+3.0
Independent	Julie Boyd	1,222	3.0	+3.0
AAFI	Will King	540	1.3	+1.3
Total formal votes		40,219	97.7	−0.3
Informal votes		950	2.3	+0.3
Turnout		41,169	90.4	
Two-party-preferred result
National	Geoff Provest	19,435	53.0	+7.1
Labor	Neville Newell	17,257	47.0	−7.1
National gain from Labor		Swing	+7.1	

==== 2003 ====
2003 New South Wales state election: Tweed
Party	Candidate	Votes	%	±%
Labor	Neville Newell	19,479	44.3	+0.1
National	Sue Vinnicombe	18,241	41.5	+0.8
Greens	Tom Tabart	3,854	8.8	+3.8
Fishing Party	Ned Kelly	1,153	2.6	+2.6
One Nation	Trent Burston	647	1.5	+1.5
Democrats	Casey Balk	557	1.3	−1.1
Total formal votes		43,931	98.1	+0.1
Informal votes		859	1.9	−0.1
Turnout		44,790	89.8	
Two-party-preferred result
Labor	Neville Newell	22,149	53.8	+1.2
National	Sue Vinnicombe	19,001	46.2	−1.2
Labor hold		Swing	+1.2	

=== Elections in the 1990s ===
==== 1999 ====
1999 New South Wales state election: Tweed
Party	Candidate	Votes	%	±%
Labor	Neville Newell	17,713	44.2	+16.4
National	Don Beck	16,315	40.7	−0.6
Independent	John Penhaligon	2,584	6.4	+6.4
Greens	Tom Tabart	2,013	5.0	+0.7
Democrats	Troy Henderson	945	2.4	+2.4
Earthsave	Tony Hollis	535	1.3	+1.3
Total formal votes		40,105	98.0	+2.0
Informal votes		834	2.0	−2.0
Turnout		40,939	91.4	
Two-party-preferred result
Labor	Neville Newell	19,402	52.6	+4.8
National	Don Beck	17,500	47.4	−4.8
Labor notional gain from National		Swing	+4.8	

District recreated

==== 1904–1999 ====
District abolished

=== Elections in the 1900s ===
==== 1901 ====
This section is an excerpt from 1901 New South Wales state election § The Tweed

1901 New South Wales state election: The Tweed
Party	Candidate	Votes	%	±%
Independent	Richard Meagher	802	66.3	+2.7
Liberal Reform	Alexander Eastaughffe	408	33.7	
Total formal votes		1,210	98.9	−0.1
Informal votes		14	1.1	+0.1
Turnout		1,224	64.4	+16.0
Independent hold				

=== Elections in the 1890s ===
==== 1898 ====
This section is an excerpt from 1898 New South Wales colonial election § The Tweed

1898 New South Wales colonial election: The Tweed
Party	Candidate	Votes	%	±%
Independent	Richard Meagher	649	63.6	
National Federal	Joseph Kelly	360	35.3	
Ind. Free Trade	William Baker	12	1.2	
Total formal votes		1,021	98.9	
Informal votes		11	1.1	
Turnout		1,032	48.4	
Independent gain from National Federal				

==== 1895 ====
This section is an excerpt from 1895 New South Wales colonial election § The Tweed

1895 New South Wales colonial election: The Tweed
Party	Candidate	Votes	%	±%
Protectionist	Joseph Kelly	445	51.9	
Ind. Protectionist	Norman Ewing	234	27.3	
Labour	Samuel Rosa	170	19.8	
Free Trade	William Baker	6	0.7	
Ind. Protectionist	George Halliday	2	0.2	
Ind. Protectionist	John Morrison	1	0.1	
Total formal votes		858	98.6	
Informal votes		12	1.4	
Turnout		870	47.9	
Protectionist hold				

==== 1894 by-election ====
1894 The Tweed by-election Thursday 6 December
Party	Candidate	Votes	%	±%
Protectionist	Joseph Kelly	526	50.1	+23.4
Protectionist	James Garvan	418	39.8	
Labour	James Murphy	105	10.0	
Independent	William Baker	1	0.1	
Total formal votes		1,050	99.2	+2.1
Informal votes		8	0.8	−2.1
Turnout		1,058	59.1 (Note: Estimate based on a roll of 1,790 at the July 1894 election.)	−24.4
Protectionist gain from Labour		Swing		

The Elections and Qualifications Committee declared that the election of John Willard (Labour) was void as he did not meet the residency qualification, having spent much of that 12 months in Queensland.

==== 1894 ====
1894 New South Wales colonial election: The Tweed
Party	Candidate	Votes	%	±%
Labour	John Willard	431	29.7	
Ind. Protectionist	Joseph Kelly	387	26.7	
Protectionist	Bruce Nicoll	218	15.0	
Ind. Protectionist	George Halliday	178	12.3	
Free Trade	William Baker	97	6.7	
Ind. Protectionist	John Marks	86	5.9	
Ind. Protectionist	David Jarman	52	3.6	
Ind. Free Trade	James Barrie	1	0.1	
Independent	Patrick Gilroy	1	0.1	
Ind. Protectionist	James Murphy	0	0.0	
Total formal votes		1,451	97.1	
Informal votes		43	2.9	
Turnout		1,494	83.5	
Labour win		(new seat)		
