= 1894 Grenfell colonial election re-count =

By-election in New South Wales, Australia

In October 1894, the Elections and Qualifications Committee conducted a re-count of the 1894 Grenfell election, in which George Greene (Free Trade) had been declared elected by a margin of 2 votes over Michael Loughnane (Labour). The Elections and Qualifications Committee consisted of 9 members, 5 Free Trade (Thomas Bavister, William McMillan, Philip Morton, Varney Parkes and Bernhard Wise) and four Protectionist (Paddy Crick, James Gormly, James Hayes, and Francis Wright).

The committee declared that George Greene (Free Trade) had not been elected the member for Grenfell, however no by-election was conducted. Instead the committee declared that Michael Loughnane (Labour) based on its own count of the result.

== Dates ==
Date	Event
17 July 1894	1894 Grenfell election
7 August 1894	George Green sworn in as member for Grenfell
7 August 1894	Elections and Qualifications Committee appointed.
26 September 1894	Petition lodged by Michael Loughnane.
9 October 1894	Petition referred to the Elections and Qualifications Committee.
25 October 1894	Elections and Qualifications Committee declared that Michael Loughlane had been elected.

== Result ==
1894 Grenfell election re-count Thursday 25 October
Party	Candidate	Votes	%	±%
Labour	Michael Loughnane	525	36.3	+0.3
Free Trade	George Greene	516	35.7	−0.4
Protectionist	Robert Vaughn	330	22.8	+0.2
Independent	John Williams	75	5.2	−0.1
Total formal votes		1,446	97.0	−0.7
Informal votes		45 (Note: Calculated on the assumption that the total number of votes did not change.)	3.0	+0.7
Turnout		1,491	71.0	'"`UNIQ−−ref−00000014−QINU`"'
Labour gain from Free Trade				

== Aftermath ==
This was the 6th and final occasion on which the Elections and Qualifications Committee overturned the result of an election without ordering a fresh election. (Note: the 5 previous occasions were Northumberland Boroughs (1856), Hastings (1870), Mudgee (1879), Young (1885) and Canterbury (1891).) A public meeting at Grenfell expressed indignation at the unfairness of the decision. The meeting called for the abolition of the parliamentary Elections and Qualifications Committee and its replacement by a tribunal outside of parliament. The committee continued however until 1928 when the Court of Disputed Returns was established as a special jurisdiction of the Supreme Court.

Michael Loughnane only held the seat for 8 months, as he did not stand for the 1895 Grenfell election and George Greene regained the seat.

== See also ==
- Electoral results for the district of Grenfell
- List of New South Wales state by-elections
