= 1894 Tweed colonial by-election =

By-election in New South Wales, Australia

A by-election for the seat of Tweed in the New South Wales Legislative Assembly was held on 6 December 1894 because the Elections and Qualifications Committee declared that the election of John Willard (Labour) was void as he did not meet the residency qualification, having spent much of that 12 months in Queensland.

== Dates ==
Date	Event
15 November 1894	Elections and Qualifications Committee held that John Willard was not qualified.
19 November 1894	Writ of election issued by the Speaker of the Legislative Assembly.
29 November 1894	Day of nomination
6 December 1894	Polling day
20 December 1894	Return of writ

== Results ==
1894 The Tweed by-election Thursday 6 December
Party	Candidate	Votes	%	±%
Protectionist	Joseph Kelly	526	50.1	+23.4
Protectionist	James Garvan	418	39.8	
Labour	James Murphy	105	10.0	
Independent	William Baker	1	0.1	
Total formal votes		1,050	99.2	+2.1
Informal votes		8	0.8	−2.1
Turnout		1,058	59.1 (Note: Estimate based on a roll of 1,790 at the July 1894 election.)	−24.4
Protectionist gain from Labour		Swing		

== See also ==
- Electoral results for the district of Tweed
- List of New South Wales state by-elections
