= Upper Florentine Valley =

Valley in the south of Tasmania, Australia

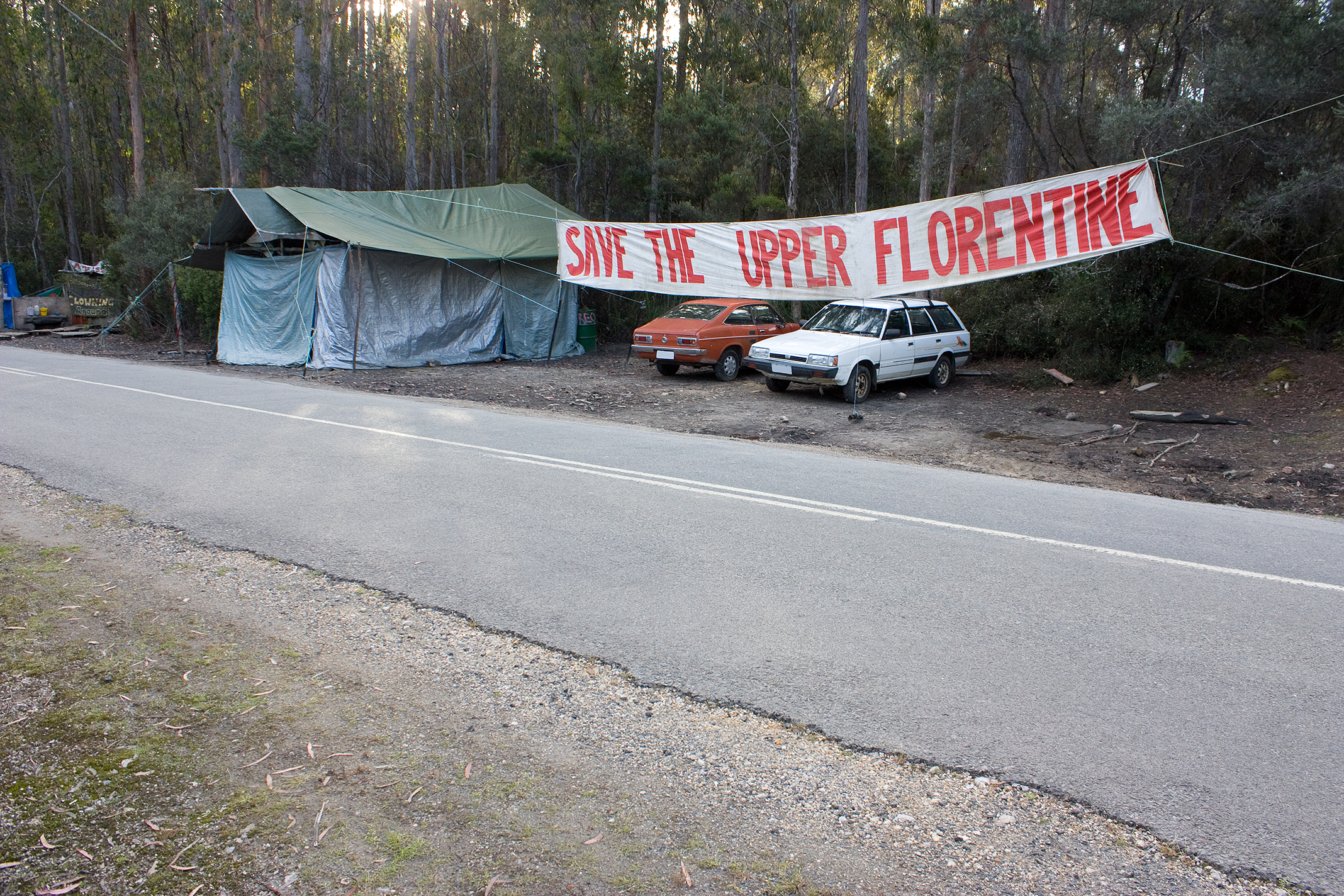
- Upper Florentine protest camp near Timbs Track.

- Location within Tasmania
- Area: 60 square kilometres (23 sq mi)

Geography
- Location: Australia, Tasmania
- Coordinates: 42.76°S 146.4°E
- Interactive map of Upper Florentine Valley

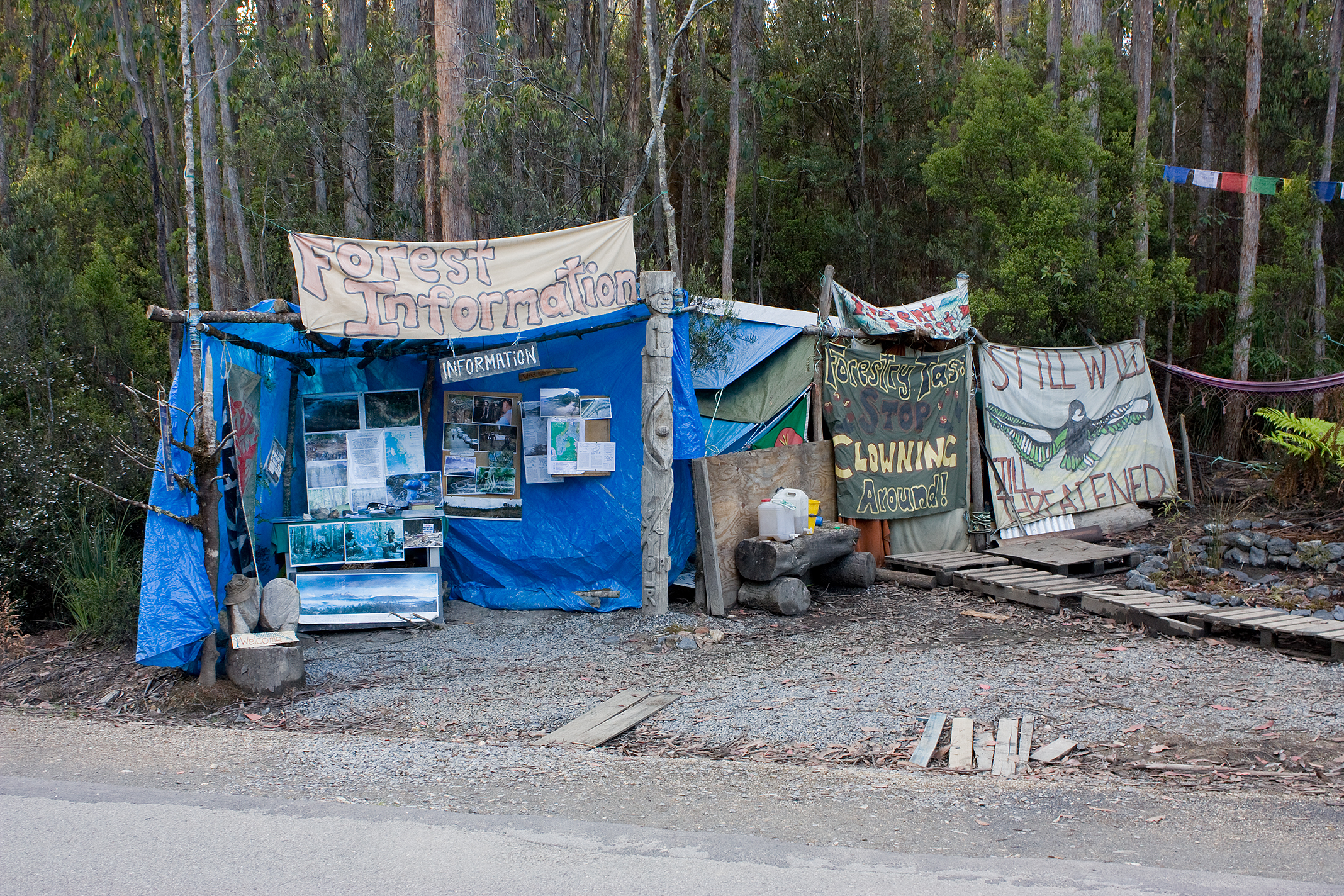
Upper Florentine protest camp near Timbs Track

The Upper Florentine Valley is a valley in the south of Tasmania, Australia, is an area recognised for its landscape and old growth forests. It is situated along the Gordon River Road near Maydena in the southwest of the island, roughly three hours drive from Hobart and comprises around 60 square kilometres (23 sq mi) of temperate rainforest and tall eucalypt forest. The Upper Florentine forms part of the Florentine catchment upstream (south) from Churchill Creek. Geographically it is an area of generally low relief valleys and flats. The area is a known habitat for threatened species of flora and fauna, including myrtle elbow orchid, grey goshawk, and spotted-tail quoll.

In 2009, the Upper Florentine received attention in the media for a series of arrests made by Tasmanian Police of protesters taking part in various pro-conservationist rallies.

== Management controversy ==
The valley was managed by Forestry Tasmania on behalf of the Tasmanian Government and featured in the ongoing political debate on deforestation and the logging of old-growth forests of Australia. While Forestry Tasmania asserted that only ten percent of the Upper Florentine catchment is available for sustainable timber production, environmental groups argued that protected areas consist of shrubs and trees that are of little use to the timber industry, whereas old growth and high conservation value forests have been specifically targeted for timber harvest.

=== Reaction to logging operations ===
Ongoing logging operations in this area have prompted pro-conservationist groups such as the Derwent Forest Alliance and The Wilderness Society (Australia) to set up a permanent blockade in the area known as Camp Florentine as early as 2006.

In 2011, community activism and environmental civil disobedience were continuing in the Upper Florentine with over 80 arrests being carried out in the area in 2010. Protesters utilised obstructionist techniques, such as blockading structures attached to tree sits to stand in the way of logging operations and prevent forest harvester equipment from moving into the valley. The conservationist camp was occupied by environmental campaigners, including the organisation Still Wild Still Threatened. In 2013, the Upper Florentine was protected from logging when the area was added to the Tasmanian Wilderness World Heritage Area.

== See also ==
- List of rivers of Australia § Tasmania
- List of valleys of Australia § Tasmania
