= Popran National Park =

National park in New South Wales, Australia

- IUCN category II (national park)
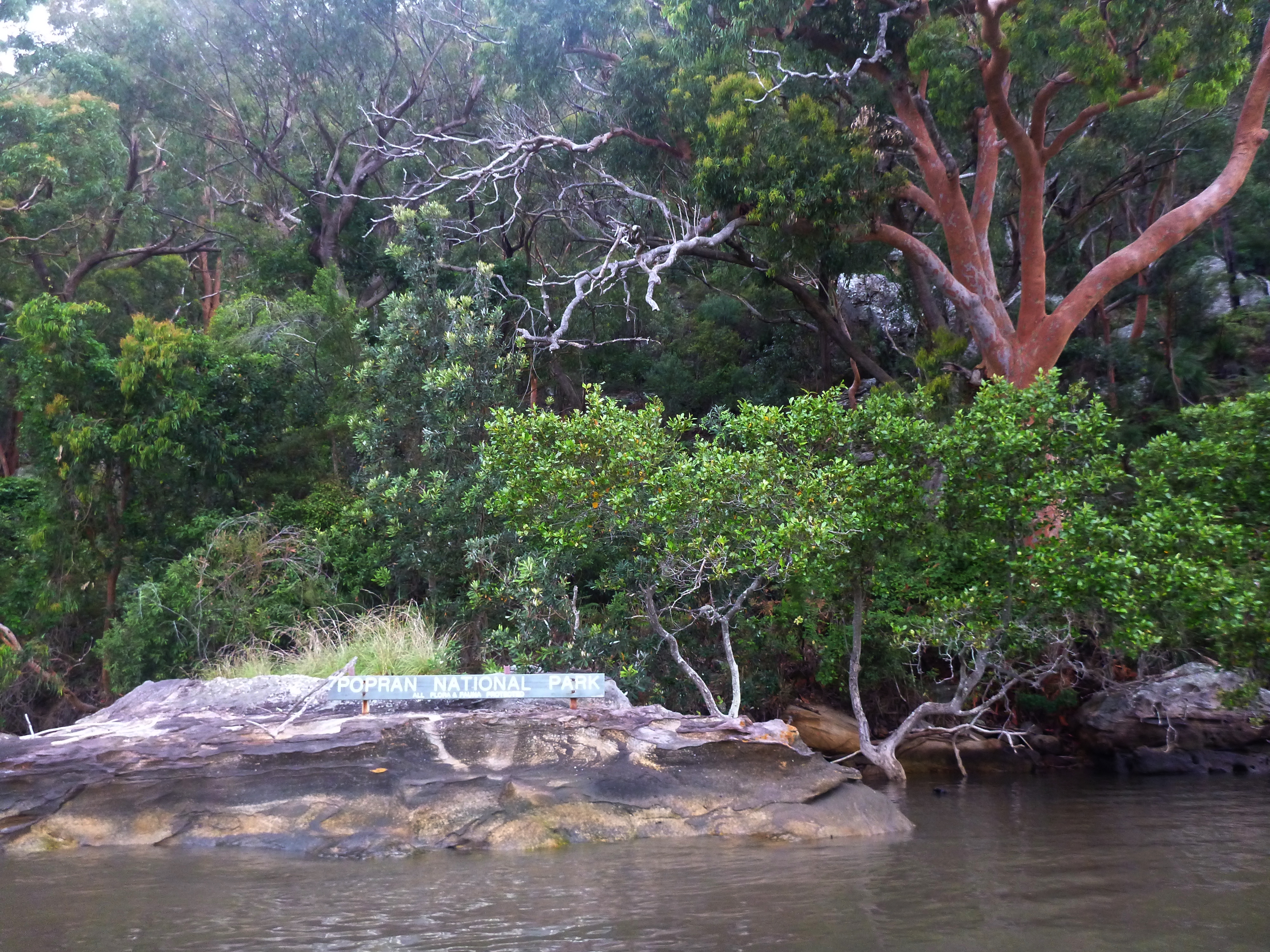
- Popran National Park, December 2016

- Location within New South Wales
- Location: New South Wales
- Nearest city: Gosford
- Coordinates: 33°22′37″S 151°10′47″E
- Area: 39.7 km^{2} (15.3 sq mi)
- Established: 30 November 1994
- Governing body: NSW National Parks and Wildlife Service
- Website: Official website

Popran National Park is a protected national park that is located west of the M1 Pacific Motorway in the Central Coast region of New South Wales, in eastern Australia. The 3,970-hectare (9,800-acre) park is situated 95 kilometres (59 mi) north of Sydney. The park takes its name from Popran Creek which rises in the locality of Central Mangrove and then flows for approximately 24 km in a mostly southern direction until it reaches Mangrove Creek. Popran Creek flows through the Glenworth Valley, also known as the Popran Valley. The average elevation of the terrain is 135 metres.

The Aboriginal heritage is felt at every step, so a historical connection with this land cannot be avoided.

Various types of recreation are available here, from horse riding, mountain biking, fishing, picnicking and bird watching.

== See also ==
- Protected areas of New South Wales
- Popran Valley
- Mangrove Creek (New South Wales)
