= Glenworth Valley =

- Popran Valley
- Location within New South Wales

Geography
- Location: New South Wales, Australia
- Coordinates: 33°25′54″S 151°10′34″E
- Topo map: 91313S_Gunderman
- Rivers: Popran Creek
- Interactive map of Glenworth Valley

Glenworth Valley is in the Central Coast region to the north of the Hawkesbury River itself 50 km (31 mi) to the north of the city of Sydney, Australia. Popran Creek flows through the valley which includes parts of the suburbs of Glenworth Valley and Mount White. Popran National Park was created in 1994 and is for the most part made up of sandstone cliffs and gullies. The creation of the park is indicative of the value the area has because of its unique indigenous and early European history, fauna, flora and geology. The Park takes its name from Popran Creek which rises in the locality of Central Mangrove and then flows for approximately 24 km (15 mi) in a mostly southern direction till it reaches Mangrove Creek.

After initial exploration by Europeans primary industrial activities included timber getting, small farming, dairying and fishing. Some of these settlers remained in the Mangrove and Glenworth Valley locality for at least five generations.

== History ==
The history of Popran Creek and Glenworth Valley includes pre and post-European settlement. Indigenous people from the 'Daruk' and 'Darkinyung' people populated the lower Hawkesbury region- migrating between valleys hunting and fishing. The Dharug and Guringai Aboriginal peoples in particular are known to have been present in this area

=== European settlement ===
Early European settlers included emancipated convicts as well as free settlers and records indicate land was taken up from the mid 1820s. The sale of land in NSW during Colonial times changed in 1825 when the sale of land by private tender began and then six years later by public auction (1831). There are numerous instances of land sales recorded in the Sydney Gazette and New South Wales Advertiser (NSW : 1803 - 1842) in the Popran.

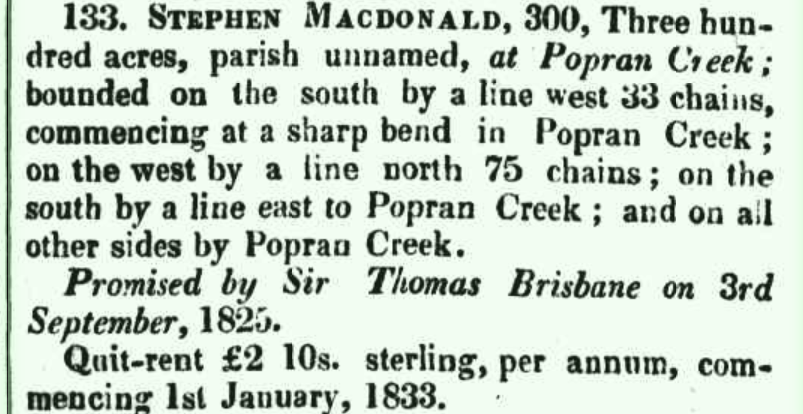
Copy of Land Grant to Stephen MacDonald published New South Wales Government Gazette Sydney, NSW 21 December 1836

One of the first to be recorded occurred in December 1835 to a James Watkins with the sale of 50 acres at 5 shillings an acre. Land was also promised to Stephen Macdonald and Edward Kelly in 1822 and these grants were formalised in December 1836. Both McDonald and Kelly had occupied their land in the upper reaches of the Popran since the mid 1820s.

Sydney was an important market for both forestry and agricultural products although most families were nearly self-sufficient. Crops included corn, vegetables and fruit. In the early days of European occupation contact with settlements on Mangrove Creek, the Hawkesbury and Sydney was almost exclusively by boat due to the difficult terrain. Some two miles up Popran Creek is Spurt Island named so by poet Henry Kendall.

=== Kelly family ===
In the upper reaches of the Popran land was first taken up by Edward Kelly in the year 1826. Kelly had been convicted for stealing a cow and was transported from Cork, Ireland in 1818. Kelly served out his sentence and the colonial records indicate he worked as a labourer. His original land grant was 50 acres and was located around four miles from the mouth of the Popran where it flows into Mangrove Creek. Edward Kelly had left behind in Ireland his wife Mary and five children. In 1842, twenty two years after his conviction in Ireland his wife and two of his sons arrived in Sydney aboard the Royal Saxon. The descendants of Edward Kelly occupied this original property until the mid nineteen hundreds.

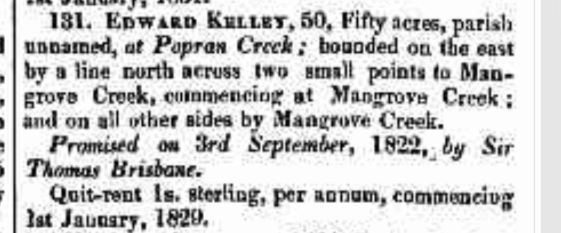
Edward Kelly Popran land grant 1836 NSW Government Gazette 1836

One of the descendants of Edward Kelly and his wife Mary was his grandson Joseph Bede Kelly (1855-1931) who was a Member of the NSW Legislative Assembly from 1894 until 1898 and also one of the founders and first chairman of directors of the North Coast Cooperative Company (NORCO).

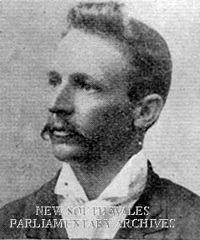
Joseph Bede Kelly NSW Parliamentarian 1894–1896. Surveyor, farmer, politician, businessman Northern Rivers region NSW grandson of convict Edward Kelly Popran Creek

Joseph Bede Kelly was the son of John Kelly, the son of Edward Kelly. John Kelly, his brother Edward (jnr) and their mother arrived in Sydney in 1841, sixteen years after Edward had arrived in the colony as a convict. John Kelly married Mary Bevan in 1844 and Joseph Bede Kelly was born on 1 May 1855 at Popran. He was the sixth of eight children. Joseph Kelly was educated at Fort Street High School and subsequently joined the NSW Surveyor- General's Department. After an initial posting to Orange he was appointed assistant Government Surveyor with the North Coast Survey Department at Grafton, NSW. From 1881 until 1919 Joseph Kelly was a prominent figure in the development of the Northern rivers region. He was a surveyor, farmer, businessman and politician.

== See also ==
- List of valleys of Australia
- Joseph Kelly (New South Wales politician)
