= Ada Augusta Holman =

Australian journalist and novelist (1869–1949)

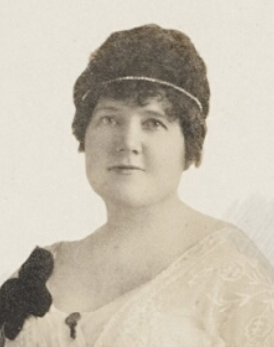
- Holman in 1917
- Born: Ada Kidgell; 3 October 1869; Ballarat, Victoria, Australia
- Died: 3 April 1949 (aged 79); Darling Point, New South Wales, Australia
- Other names: "Myee"; "Marcus Malcom"; "Nardoo"; "Literoctopus"
- Occupations: Journalist, novelist
- Spouse: William Arthur Holman (m. 1901)

Ada Augusta Holman (née Kidgell) (3 October 1869 – 3 April 1949) was a journalist and novelist in New South Wales, Australia. However, her writing career was increasingly curtailed after her marriage to politician William Arthur Holman, who was to become Premier of New South Wales.

== Early life ==
Ada Kidgell was born in Ballarat, Victoria, on 3 October 1869, the daughter of journalist Ebenezer Kidgell and his wife Agnes (née Martin). Her father worked on Clunes Guardian, the Hawthorn and Boroondara Standard and in 1895–1902 as sub-editor, The Sunday Times in Sydney. She became a teacher at a private school in Narrandera, New South Wales.

== Literary career ==
Ada Kidgell was active in debating societies and well-informed about literature and politics. Writing as "Myee", she contributed a report on the Sydney literary scene to Melbourne Punch. She published short stories and political articles under her own name as well as a number of pseudonyms including "Marcus Malcom", "Nardoo" and "Literoctopus". She was an active member of the Fellowship of Australian Writers.

Her books included a memoir, Memoirs of a Premier's Wife, a travel book titled My Wander Year, the novel Sport of the Gods and two children's books.

In 1921, her book Sport of the Gods came third in the De Garis Prize.

== Marriage and subsequent career ==
On Tuesday, 22 January 1901, Ada Kidgell married William Arthur Holman (1871–1934), future Premier of New South Wales, at the Australian Church in Sydney. She visited Britain and the United States with her husband; she described Woodrow Wilson as "stuffy" and "pompous". From October 1938, she was granted a pension of £1 per week by the Commonwealth Literary Fund.

== Works ==
- Holman, Ada A. (Ada Augusta) (1914), My wander year : some jottings in a year's travel, W. Brooks
- Holman, Ada A. (1917), Little Miss Anzac : the true story of an Australian doll, Rodd, Nelle (illustrator), T.C. & E.C. Jack
- Holman, Ada A. (Ada Augusta) (1921), Sport of the gods, C.J. De Garis Pub. House
- Holman, Ada A. (Ada Augusta); Avery, Harold. Little Robinson Crusoes; Talbot, Ethel. Moat-house mystery (1923), The adventures of Woodeny : the story of a doll, and other stories, Nelson
- Holman, Ada A. (Ada Augusta) (1931), Elka-reva-ree : a story for children, Edwards Dunlop and Co
- Holman, Ada A. (Ada Augusta) (1947), Memoirs of a premier's wife, Angus and Robertson

== Later life ==
Ada Holman died in a private hospital in Darling Point, Sydney, on 3 April 1949; she was survived by her daughter Dr Portia Holman.

Kidgell Place, in the Canberra suburb of Gilmore, is named in her honour.
