= Portia Holman =

Australian child psychiatrist (1903–1983)

Portia Grenfell Holman (20 November 1903 – 16 May 1983) was an Australian child psychiatrist who practiced in London.

== Early life and education ==
Holman was born in 1903 in Sydney; she was the only child of William Holman, who would become the Premier of New South Wales, and Ada Augusta Holman, a writer. She gained a Bachelor of Arts at The Women's College of the University of Sydney, and in 1923 she enrolled at Newnham College, Cambridge, graduating in economics in 1926. She then went on to study at the University of Paris and the London School of Economics, before taking up a role in lecturing and research at the University of St Andrews from 1927 to 1933. She returned to Newnham College in 1933 to study medicine, and qualified in 1939 after completing her clinical training at the Royal Free Hospital. She put her studies on hold during the Spanish Civil War to serve as a medical auxiliary for the Republican faction.

== Medical career ==
In her early career, Holman held appointments at the Elizabeth Garrett Anderson Hospital, Great Ormond Street Hospital, and Mill Hill Emergency Hospital. After taking a Diploma in Psychological Medicine, she was appointed as a psychiatrist to West Middlesex Hospital in 1945 and the Elizabeth Garrett Anderson Hospital in 1946. From 1944 until 1970, she also directed the first child guidance clinic at Ealing, and in the late 1940s she helped to set up Mulberry Bush School, a special school in Oxfordshire for "maladjusted children". Holman was elected Fellow of the Royal College of Physicians in 1961 and served as a senior psychiatrist the Elizabeth Garrett Anderson Hospital until her retirement in 1969.

== Personal life ==
Holman was an active member of the Labour Party and campaigned for the party during elections. She strongly advocated for the introduction of the National Health Service in the 1940s and, in her old age, participated in protests against the closure of the Elizabeth Garrett Anderson Hospital and in demonstrations for nuclear disarmament.

After her retirement, Holman continued to live in London until 1982, when she moved to Oxford. She died suddenly from a cerebral haemorrhage while visiting London in 1983.
