= List of valleys of Australia =

This is a List of Valleys of Australia.

== New South Wales ==
The Geographical Names Board of New South Wales lists 37 valleys in the Geographical Names Register (GNR) of NSW.

- Arbon Vale
- Babbage Ravine
- Bindra Basin
- Bromley Basin
- Brumby Pass
- Capertee Valley
- Cedar Valley
- Edies Glen
- Erskine Valley
- Glenfinlass
- Glenworth Valley
- Jamison Valley
- Jerrawangala Valley
- Kangaroo Valley
- Kanimbla Valley
- Kedumba Valley
- Kemps Valley
- Ladysmith Glen
- Luminous Valley
- Lyrebird Glen
- Megalong Valley
- Monolith Valley
- Old Mans Valley
- Orara Valley
- Queen Charlottes Vale
- Sidmouth Valley
- Stoddarts Valley
- Tam O'Shanters Glen
- Three Mile Glen
- Uargon Valley
- Valley of The Shadows
- Valley of The Swamps
- Water Nymphs Dell
- Wattley Hollow
- Whalania Deep
- Wolgan Valley
- Yarramalong Valley

Although not included in the Geographical Names Register, the following are also valleys in New South Wales:

- Berowra Valley
- Brindabella Valley
- Bylong Valley
- Grose Valley
- Hunter Valley - Technically the Hunter Valley is not a single valley but a series of interlinking valleys forming a single region known formally as the Hunter Region.
- Macquarie Valley (Shellharbour)
- Tweed Valley

== Northern Territory ==
- Palm Valley

== Queensland ==
- Boyne Valley
- Currumbin Valley
- Fassifern Valley
- Goldsborough Valley
- Lockyer Valley
- Numinbah Valley
- Samford Valley
- Tallebudgera Valley

== South Australia ==
- Aroona Valley
- Barossa Valley
- Clare Valley
- Eden Valley
- Inman Valley
- Kenton Valley
- Second Valley

== Tasmania ==
Placenames Tasmania, the official nomenclature agency of Tasmania, lists 516 geographic entities classed as 'valleys' and 164 with the name of Valley.

- Coal River Valley
- Cradle Valley
- Derwent Valley
- Fingal Valley
- Huon Valley
- Meander Valley
- Styx Valley
- Tamar Valley
- Upper Florentine Valley
- Weld Valley

== Victoria ==
- Goulburn Valley
- Indigo Valley
- King Valley
- Latrobe Valley

== Western Australia ==
- Blackwood Valley
- Helena Valley
- Swan Valley

== See also ==
- List of rivers of Australia
