= William Holman =

Australian politician

The Honourable William Holman KC
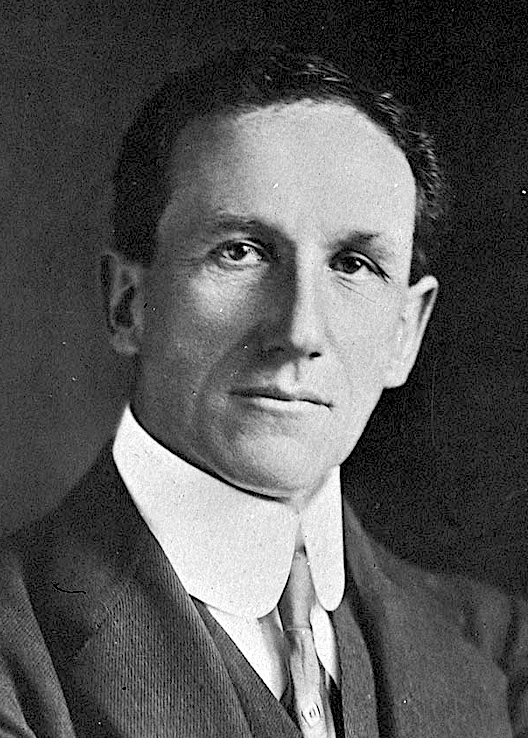

19th Premier of New South Wales
- In office 30 June 1913 – 12 April 1920
- Monarch: George V
- Governor: Sir Gerald Strickland; Sir Walter Davidson
- Preceded by: James McGowen
- Succeeded by: John Storey

Attorney-General of New South Wales
- In office 21 October 1910 – 29 January 1914
- Premier: James McGowen
- Preceded by: Charles Wade
- Succeeded by: David Hall

Member of the Australian Parliament for Martin
- In office 19 December 1931 – 5 June 1934
- Preceded by: John Eldridge
- Succeeded by: William McCall

Member of the New South Wales Legislative Assembly
- In office 27 July 1898 – 18 February 1920
- Constituency: Cootamundra (1904–1920); Grenfell (1898–1904)

Personal details
- Born: 4 August 1871 St Pancras, London, England
- Died: 5 June 1934 (aged 62) Gordon, New South Wales, Australia
- Party: Labor (until 1916); Nationalist (1916–1931); UAP (after 1931)
- Spouse: Ada Kidgell (m. 1901)
- Relations: Portia Holman (daughter)
- Occupation: Cabinet-maker, trade union official, journalist

William Arthur Holman (4 August 1871 – 5 June 1934) was an Australian politician who served as Premier of New South Wales from 1913 to 1920. He came to office as the leader of the Labor Party, but was expelled from the party in the split of 1916. He subsequently became the inaugural leader of the NSW branch of the Nationalist Party.

Holman was born in London and arrived in Australia at the age of 17, becoming a cabinet-maker in Sydney. Before being elected to parliament, he was active in the labour movement as a journalist and union official. He was elected to the New South Wales Legislative Assembly in 1898. He began studying law part-time, and was called to the bar in 1903. In 1910, Holman became Attorney-General of New South Wales in the state's first Labor government, under Premier James McGowen. He succeeded McGowen as premier in June 1913, and later that year led his party to victory at the 1913 state election.

In 1916, Holman supported the "Yes" vote in the referendum on overseas conscription and was consequently expelled from the Labor Party. He and his supporters remained in government with the backing of the opposition Liberal Reform Party, and the two groups subsequently merged to form the NSW branch of the new Nationalist Party, under Holman's leadership. The new party won a large majority at the 1917 election. However, it was heavily defeated at the 1920 election, in which Holman lost his own seat. After his defeat, he returned to his legal practice and was made King's Counsel. He was elected to the House of Representatives for the United Australia Party at the 1931 federal election, but was in poor health and died before completing his first term.

== Early life ==
Holman was born in St Pancras, London, England in 1871, the son of William Holman, an actor, and actress May Burney. He was educated at an Anglican school and was apprenticed as a cabinetmaker. He attended night classes and literary societies.

He attributed his success and love of learning to the teaching of Matilda Sharpe who taught Latin to classes of up to 80. The family migrated to Melbourne, Victoria in October 1888. The burning of the Bijou Theatre in Melbourne in 1889 resulted in their move to Sydney, New South Wales.

== Trade union activity ==
As a cabinet maker in Sydney, Holman was interested in the ideas of John Stuart Mill, William Morris, Herbert Spencer and Charles Darwin, and became very active in the Australian labour movement. He joined the Single Tax League, the Australian Socialist League, and the newly formed Labor Electoral League, a forerunner of the Australian Labor Party (ALP). In the Australian Socialist League, he mixed with anarchists and socialists, and met future Prime Minister Billy Hughes, as well as Creo Stanley, Ernie Lane, Henry Lawson and J. D. Fitzgerald. Holman and Hughes were associated with Arthur Desmond on the scandal sheet paper, The New Order.

In 1893, Holman he became Secretary of the Railways and Tramways Employees' Union, representing the union on the Sydney Trades and Labor Council. With the support of the Labor Electoral League, he unsuccessfully stood for election to the New South Wales Legislative Assembly in 1894 and 1895. During that period, he was the proprietor of the Daily Post newspaper, sympathetic to the labour movement, which ended in liquidation, with Holman and four other directors convicted of fraud. He spent nearly two months in jail before the conviction was quashed. He went on to become a journalist for the Grenfell Vedette, and later its proprietor. From 1896 to 1898, he worked as an organiser for the Australian Workers' Union.

== Legal profession ==
In 1900, Holman began to study law part-time and, in 1903, he passed the University of London's intermediate examination, being admitted to the bar as a barrister of the Supreme Court of New South Wales on 31 July 1903. In 1909, he and P.A. Jacobs co-authored Australian Mercantile Law. In the 1920s, when he resumed his legal practice, he was made a King's Counsel. After a lectureship in Brisbane in 1928, The Australian constitution : its interpretation and amendment was published.

== Parliamentary career ==
In the late 1890s, Holman was on the central executive of the embryonic Labor Party, before being elected as the Member for Grenfell in the New South Wales Legislative Assembly in 1898. When Grenfell was abolished in 1904 as part of the post-Federation downsizing of the Legislative Assembly, Holman transferred to the new seat of Cootamundra. He became deputy-leader of the Labor party in 1905. In 1910, the Labor Party first won Government in New South Wales with a slim majority of 46 seats in a parliament of 90, with James McGowen as Premier, and Holman was made Attorney General.

== Premier of New South Wales ==
=== Labor government ===
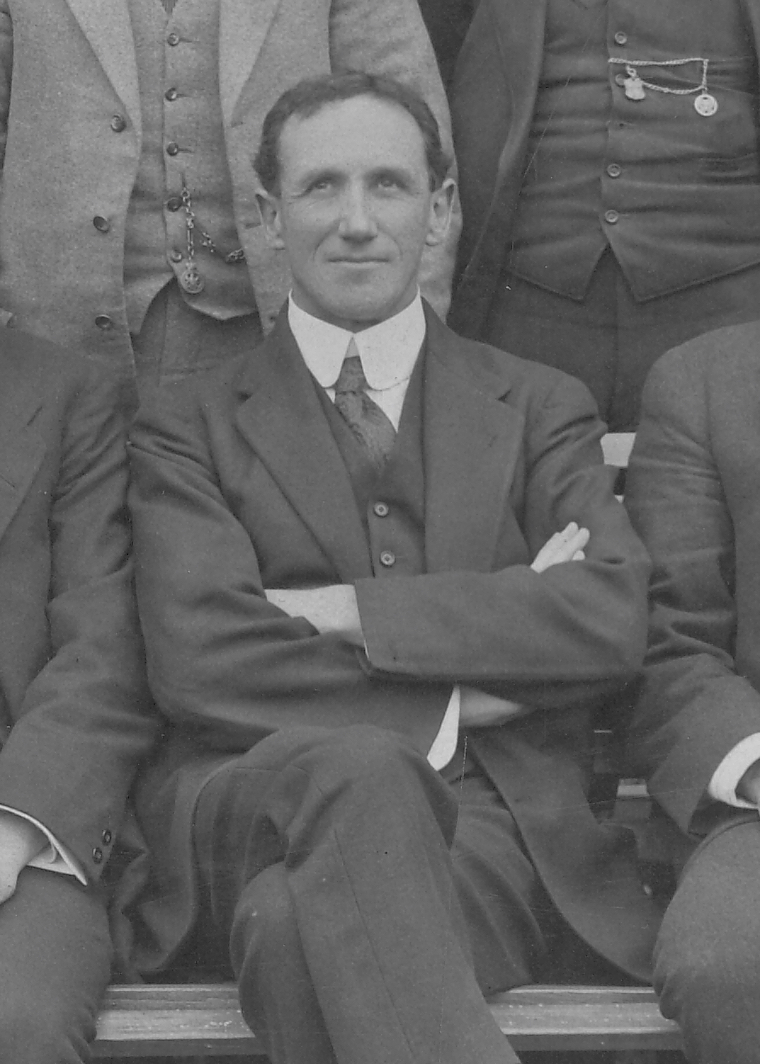
Holman at the Premiers' Conference in Adelaide in 1916

On 30 June 1913 McGowen resigned and Holman was named leader of the New South Wales Labor Party, hence becoming Premier. During his government, many state-owned enterprises were established to compete with private businesses, as a compromise to the Labor policy on nationalisation. The Labor Party had a policy commitment to abolishing the New South Wales Legislative Council, and Holman moved a motion to that effect in 1893. Only 47 per cent of Government bills were passed by the Upper House for the period between 1910 and 1916. However, in 1912, without consultation with the party machine or the Trades and Labor Council, Holman contradicted his position by making nine appointments to the Upper House, some of whom were not members of the Labor Party. Other issues placing him at odds with the labour movement included the government's failure to control prices and profiteering during the war, and its attitudes to pay and conditions of public servants.

=== Nationalist government ===
In 1916, the issue of conscription for overseas service divided the Labor Party and the wider Australian community. While much of the Australian labour movement and general community were opposed to conscription, Holman strongly supported it, as did federal Prime Minister Billy Hughes. Both Holman and Hughes were expelled from the Labor Party for that stance. On 15 November 1916, Holman and 17 other pro-conscription Labor MPs (including seven of his ministers) formed a coalition with the opposition Liberal Reform Party. Holman remained as Premier. Early in 1917, Holman and his supporters merged with Liberal Reform to form the state branch of the new Nationalist Party. Although the new party was dominated by former Liberal Reformers, Holman was chosen as the merged party's leader, with former Liberal Reform leader Charles Wade as his deputy. Holman hence remained as premier.

At the general election held that March, the Nationalists won a huge victory, picking up a 13-seat swing which was magnified by the large number of Labor MPs who followed Holman out of the party. It proved to be a harbinger of the Nationalists' equally massive victory in the federal election held two months later.

Holman vigorously defended the state-owned enterprises from his new conservative allies. However, at the 13 March 1920 state election, Holman and his Nationalists were thrown from office in a massive swing, being succeeded by a Labor government under the short-lived John Storey. Unusually for a long-serving premier, Holman was defeated in his own seat. However, he continued outside Parliament as a senior figure in conservative politics.

== Federal politics and death ==
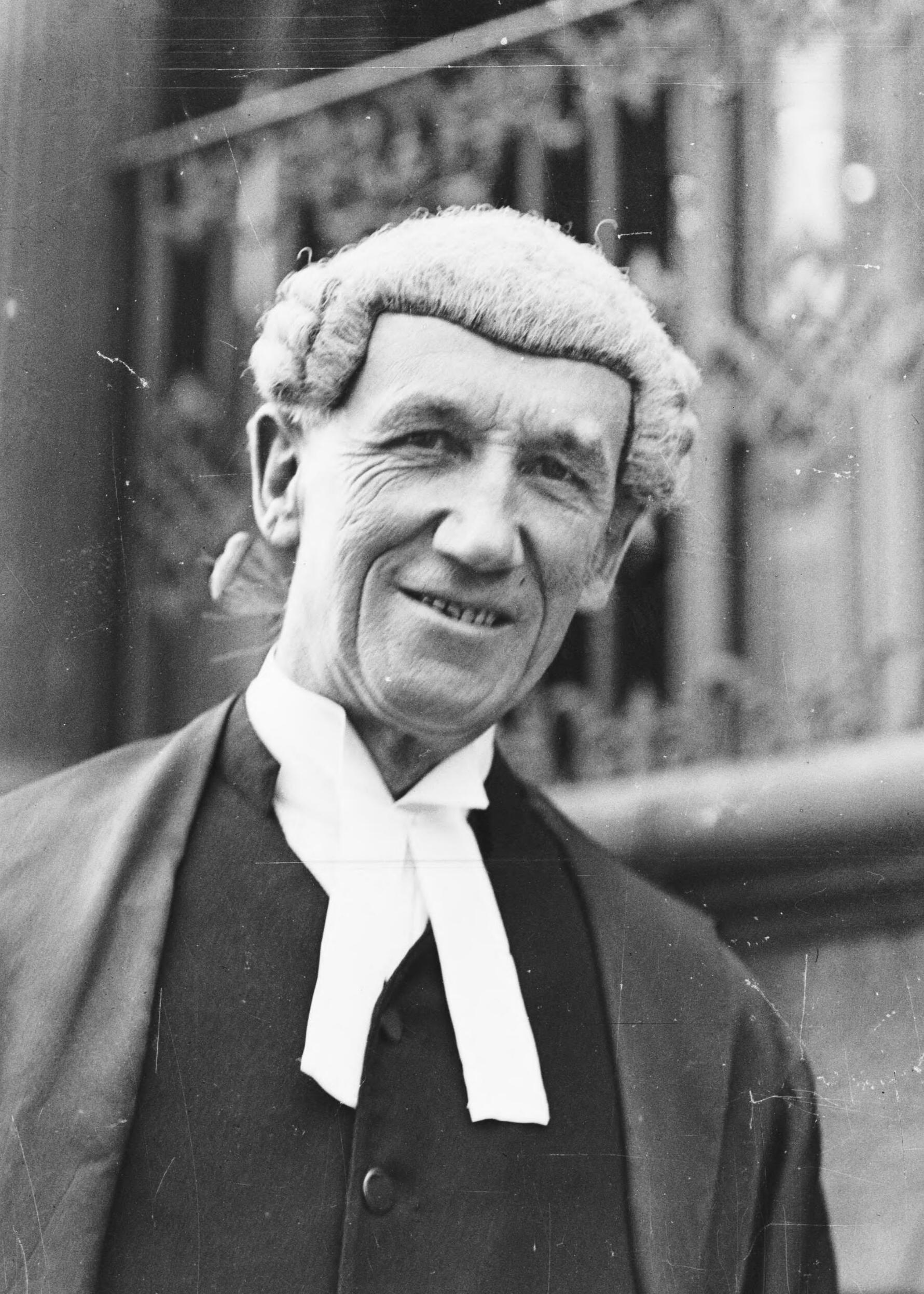
Holman in barrister's garb during a 1928 New South Wales royal commission

Holman's later parliamentary career was less notable than might have been expected from his 1910–20 achievements. He was elected to the federal parliament as the Sydney seat of Martin in December 1931 as a member of the United Australia Party, which by this time had absorbed the Nationalists. He had an undistinguished time as a backbencher in the Joseph Lyons government. His health having deteriorated over a considerable period, he died on 5 June 1934 in the Sydney suburb of Gordon, apparently from shock and loss of blood after a difficult tooth extraction on the previous day. He was cremated at Northern Suburbs Crematorium on 6 June 1934.

It is rather telling that Holman was not considered for a post in Lyons' cabinet. While Holman and Lyons had been on opposite sides of the World War I conscription debate, both were Labor defectors who had previously been state Labor leaders and premiers. The ensuing Labor split over conscription had helped Lyons ascend to the Tasmanian Labor leadership. In fact, Lyons' tenure as Tasmanian Labor leader from 1916 to 1929 briefly overlapped Holman's tenure as NSW Labor leader from 1913 to 1917. However, Holman had been in poor health for several years before his election to Canberra, which probably disqualified him for ministerial preferment in any event.

== Legacy ==
Holman is still a controversial figure, much like Hughes. Since he followed Hughes' example in leaving the ALP and heading a conservative government, he became and remains a traitor in the eyes of Labor historians. Although Holman protected the state-owned enterprises he had helped create during his ALP days, the Australian labour movement still considers him a "rat".

Holman Park in the Sydney suburb of Hornsby on the corner of Northcote and Sherbrooke Roads is named after him.

== Personal life ==
On 22 January 1901, Holman married journalist and novelist Ada Augusta Kidgell, niece of James Kidgell, a Member of the Queensland Legislative Assembly. Their one child, Portia Holman, was born on 20 November 1903. After tertiary studies in England and France, she qualified as a doctor at Cambridge University, specialising in psychiatry, and worked in various positions in England.

In 1934, a portrait of Holman by John Longstaff was awarded the Archibald Prize for portraiture. It was later acquired by the Geelong Art Gallery.

== Notes ==
New South Wales Legislative Assembly
| Preceded by George Greene | Member for Grenfell; 1898 – 1904 | District abolished |
| New district | Member for Cootamundra; 1904 – 1920 | Succeeded by Peter Loughlin; Hugh Main; Greg McGirr |
Political offices
| Preceded by Charles Wade | Attorney General of New South Wales; 1910 – 1914 | Succeeded by David Hall |
| Preceded by John Garland | Minister for Justice; 1910 – 1912 | Succeeded by David Hall |
| Preceded by James McGowen | Colonial Secretary of New South Wales; 1913 – 1914 | Succeeded by John Cann |
| Preceded by James McGowen | Premier of New South Wales; 1913 – 1920 | Succeeded by John Storey |
| Preceded by John Cann | Colonial Treasurer of New South Wales; 1914 – 1918 | Succeeded by John Fitzpatrick |
| Preceded by Campbell Carmichael | Minister of Public Instruction; 1915 | Succeeded by Arthur Griffith |
Party political offices
| Preceded by James McGowen | Leader of the Australian Labor Party in New South Wales; 1913 – 1917 | Succeeded by Ernest Durack |
| New political party | Leader of the New South Wales Nationalist Party; 1917 – 1920 | Succeeded by George Fuller |
Australian House of Representatives
| Preceded by John Eldridge | Member for Martin; 1931 – 1934 | Succeeded by William McCall |
