= Electoral district of Grenfell =

Former state electoral district of New South Wales, Australia

Grenfell was an electoral district of the Legislative Assembly in the Australian state of New South Wales, created in November 1880, partly replacing Lachlan, and named after and including the Central West town of Grenfell. It was abolished in 1904, with the downsizing of the Legislative Assembly after Federation.

== Members for Grenfell ==
Member	Party	Period
Robert Vaughn	None	1880–1887
Robert Vaughn	Protectionist	1887–1889
George Greene	Free Trade	1889–1891
Robert Vaughn	Labour	1891–1894
George Greene	Free Trade	1894–1894
Michael Loughnane	Labour	1894–1895
George Greene	Free Trade	1895–1898
William Holman	Labour	1898–1904

== Election results ==
1901 New South Wales state election: Grenfell
Party	Candidate	Votes	%	±%
Labour	William Holman	1,299	51.7	−3.9
Liberal Reform	Arthur Grimm	1,213	48.3	
Total formal votes		2,512	100.0	+0.4
Informal votes		0	0.0	−0.4
Turnout		2,512	68.9	11.3
Labour hold				
