= Robert Vaughn (Australian politician) =

Australian politician

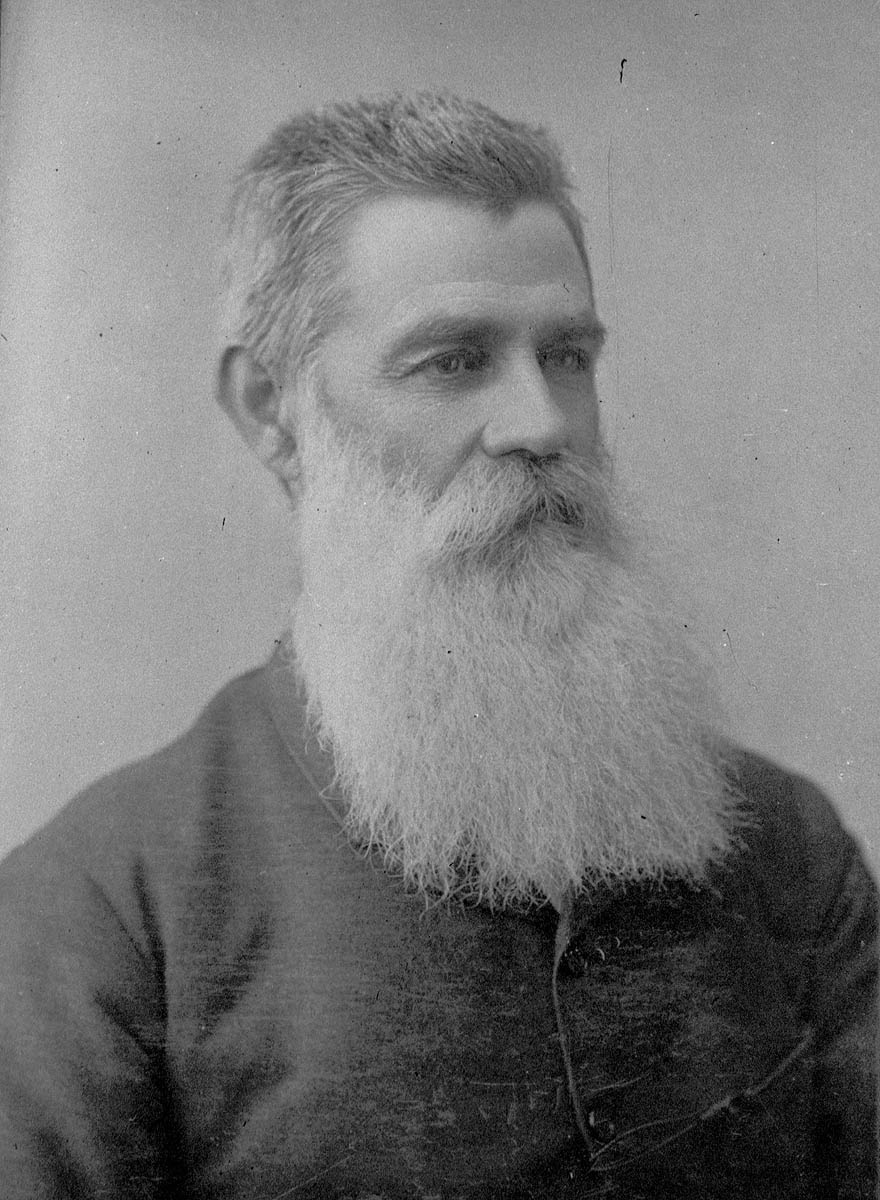

Personal details
- Born: 1833 Ohio, United States
- Died: 14 April 1908 (aged 75) Paddington, New South Wales, Australia
- Spouse: Sarah Anne Colls (m. 1864)
- Education: Geauga Seminary

Robert Matterson Vaughn (1833 – 14 April 1908) was an Australian politician, member of the New South Wales Legislative Assembly.

Vaughn was born in Ohio, United States of America, son of Jesse Vaughn, a farmer, and his wife Betsy, née Matterson. Vaughn was educated at the Baptist Geauga Seminary in Chester, Ohio. In 1852 Vaughn travelled to the Californian goldfields. In 1853 Vaughn arrived in Sydney and became a professional goldminer on the major diggings in New South Wales and Victoria.

Vaughn represented Grenfell in the Legislative Assembly of New South Wales from November 1880, and was Secretary for Mines in the fifth Robertson Ministry, from December 1885 to February 1886. He was defeated by George Greene at the general election in 1889. At the general election in 1891 he was again returned for Grenfell as a Labour candidate. He stood as a Protectionist candidate at the 1894 election, but finished third, with Greene regaining the seat.

Vaughn married Sarah Anne Colls on 12 February 1864, and had 11 children. He died in Paddington, New South Wales on 14 April 1908.

Parliament of New South Wales
Political offices
Preceded by George Thornton	Secretary for Mines; December 1885 – February 1886	Succeeded by James Fletcher
New South Wales Legislative Assembly
New seat	Member for Grenfell; 1880–1889	Succeeded by George Greene
Preceded by George Greene	Member for Grenfell; 1891–1894	Succeeded by George Greene
