= George Greene (Australian politician) =

Australian politician

- Born: 20 July 1838; Collon, Co Louth, Ireland
- Died: 22 December 1911 (aged 73); Grenfell
- Burial place: "Iandra" Greenthorpe
- Spouse: Ellen Crawford

George Henry Greene (20 July 1838 – 22 December 1911) was an Irish-born Australian politician.

He was born in Collon in County Louth to farmer William Pomeroy Greene and Anne Griffith. In 1842 the family moved to Melbourne, where William Greene established the Woodlands estate. Greene studied at the University of Melbourne, where he received a Bachelor of Arts, and was subsequently a pastoralist on the Murray River. In 1870 he married Ellen Elizabeth Crawford, with whom he had five children. In 1875, he sold his share in his properties and embarked on a two-year world tour. On his return Greene bought Iandra, a 32,600 acre (13,193 ha) estate near Grenfell, in 1878 and began grazing and wheat-growing.

In 1889 he was elected to the New South Wales Legislative Assembly as the Free Trade member for Grenfell. Defeated in 1891, he returned in 1894 but his election was invalidated a few months later. Re-elected again in 1895, he retired in 1898. From 1899 to 1911 he was a member of the New South Wales Legislative Council. In 1893 he had been Commissioner of the Chicago Exposition. Greene died at Grenfell in 1911.

New South Wales Legislative Assembly
Preceded by Robert Vaughn	Member for Grenfell; 1889–1891	Succeeded by Robert Vaughn
Preceded by Robert Vaughn	Member for Grenfell; 1894	Succeeded by Michael Loughnane
Preceded by Michael Loughnane	Member for Grenfell; 1895–1898	Succeeded by William Holman
