= John Willard (Australian politician) =

Australian politician

John Willard (1857 − after 1898) was an English-born Australian politician.

He was born at St Leonards-on-Sea, and began work as a whitesmith at the age of fourteen. Eventually an engineer, he became manager of an ironworks at Newcastle-on-Tyne. In October 1879 he married Jessie Jane Brewer. Migrating to Queensland in 1883, he established his own business and became closely involved in the labour movement, also serving on Brisbane City Council. He moved to Sydney in 1893 and in July of the following year was elected to the New South Wales Legislative Assembly as the Labor member for Tweed. The Electoral and Qualifications Committee, however, ruled that Willard's claimed move did not amount to residence in the state of New South Wales, and he was unseated in November 1894. Little is known of his life after leaving politics (although he did re-emerge in 1898 as an independent free trade candidate for Richmond), and his date of death is not known.

New South Wales Legislative Assembly
| New seat | Member for Tweed; 1894 | Succeeded by Joseph Kelly |
