= Michael Loughnane =

Australian politician

Michael John Loughnane (born 1867, date of death unknown) was an Australian politician.

== Biography ==
He was born at Wombat. A Catholic farmer, little is known of his life. In 1894 he was contested the seat of Grenfell for the Labor Party, losing by two votes to the Free Trade candidate George Greene. Following a recount, Loughnane was instead declared elected and took his seat as the member, but he did not contest the 1895 election.

New South Wales Legislative Assembly
Preceded by George Greene	Member for Grenfell; 1894–1895	Succeeded by George Greene
