= Joseph Kelly (New South Wales politician) =

Australian politician

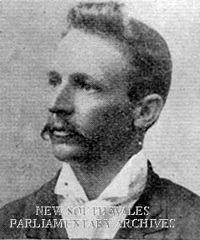
Joseph Bede Kelly NSW Parliamentarian 1894–1896. Surveyor, farmer, politician, businessman Northern Rivers region NSW grandson of convict Edward Kelly Popran Creek

Joseph Bede Kelly (1 May 1855 – 5 June 1931) was an Australian politician, surveyor, farmer and businessman.

Joseph Bede Kelly was born at Gosford to farmer John Kelly and Mary Bevin. He attended Fort Street Model School before becoming a surveyor; he also farmed land around Byron Bay.

Joseph Bede Kelly (1855–1931) was the grandson of former convict Edward Kelly and his wife Mary who had taken up land on the upper reaches of Popran Creek in the Glenworth Valley off the Hawkesbury River north of Sydney in 1826. Joseph Bede Kelly was the son of John Kelly who was the son of Edward Kelly. John Kelly, his brother Edward (jnr) and their mother arrived in Sydney in 1841, sixteen years after Edward had arrived in the colony as a convict. John Kelly married Mary Bevan in 1844 and Joseph Bede Kelly was born on 1 May 1855 at Popran Creek. He was the sixth of eight children. Joseph Kelly was educated at Fort Street High School and subsequently joined the NSW Surveyor- General's Department. After an initial posting to Orange he was appointed assistant Government Surveyor with the North Coast Survey Department at Grafton, NSW. From 1881 until 1919 Joseph Kelly was a prominent figure in the development of the Northern rivers region. He was a surveyor, farmer, businessman and politician. He was also one of the founders and first chairman of directors of the North Coast Cooperative Company (NORCO)

In 1894 he was elected to the New South Wales Legislative Assembly as the Protectionist member for Tweed. Re-elected in 1895, he was defeated in 1898.Joseph Kelly remained in the northern rivers region until 1918 after which he retired to his birthplace and property on Popran Creek, Glenworth Valley. He died at Mangrove Creek in 1931.

== See also ==
- Popran Valley
- Norco Co-operative

New South Wales Legislative Assembly
Preceded by John Willard	Member for Tweed; 1894–1898	Succeeded by Richard Meagher
