= Electoral results for the district of Newtown =

Election results for Newtown, New South Wales, Australia

Newtown, an electoral district of the Legislative Assembly in the Australian state of New South Wales, has had four incarnations, the first from 1859 to 1894, the second from 1904 until 1920, the third from 1927 until 1950 and the fourth from 2015 until the present.

== Members ==
=== First incarnation 1859–1894 ===
First incarnation (1859–1894)
Election	Member	Party						
1859	Alexander McArthur	None						
1860	Alexander McArthur	None						
1861 by	Thomas Holt	None						
1864	Stephen Brown	None						
1869	Stephen Brown	None						
1872	Stephen Brown	None						
1874	Stephen Brown	None						
1877	Stephen Brown	None	Member	Party				
1880	Stephen Brown	None	William Foster	None				
1881 by	Joseph Mitchell	None	William Foster	None				
1882	Henry Copeland	None	Frederick Gibbes	None				
1883 by	Joseph Mitchell	None	Frederick Gibbes	None	Member	Party		
1885	James Smith	None	Frederick Gibbes	None	William Foster	None		
1887	Nicholas Hawken	Free Trade	Frederick Gibbes	Free Trade	William Foster	Free Trade		
1st 1888 by	Nicholas Hawken	Free Trade	Joseph Abbott	Free Trade	William Foster	Free Trade		
2nd 1888 by	Nicholas Hawken	Free Trade	Joseph Abbott	Free Trade	Joseph Mitchell	Free Trade		
1889	Nicholas Hawken	Free Trade	Joseph Abbott	Free Trade	Edmund Molesworth	Free Trade	Member	Party
1891	Francis Cotton	Labor	Joseph Abbott	Free Trade	Edmund Molesworth	Free Trade	John Hindle	Labor
Second incarnation (1904–1920)
Election	Member	Party						
1904	Robert Hollis	Labor						
1907	Robert Hollis	Labor						
1910	Robert Hollis	Labor						
1913	Robert Hollis	Labor						
1917	Frank Burke	Labor						
Third incarnation (1927–1950)
Election	Member	Party						
1927	Frank Burke	Labor						
1930	Frank Burke	Labor						
1932	Frank Burke	Labor (NSW)						
1935	Frank Burke	Labor (NSW)						
1938	Frank Burke	Labor						
1941	Frank Burke	Labor						
1944	Lilian Fowler	Lang Labor						
1947	Lilian Fowler	Lang Labor						
Fourth incarnation (2015–present)
Election	Member	Party						
2015	Jenny Leong	Greens						
2019	Jenny Leong	Greens						
2023	Jenny Leong	Greens						

== Election results ==
=== Elections in the 2020s ===
==== 2023 ====
2023 New South Wales state election: Newtown
Party	Candidate	Votes	%	±%
Greens	Jenny Leong	26,758	54.1	+9.9
Labor	David Hetherington	15,104	30.5	+1.9
Liberal	Fiona Douskou	6,365	12.9	−1.7
Sustainable Australia	Christopher Thomas	1,275	2.6	+0.8
Total formal votes		49,502	98.5	+0.6
Informal votes		769	1.5	−0.6
Turnout		50,271	84.4	−0.8
Notional two-party-preferred count
Labor	David Hetherington	35,145	82.3	+4.1
Liberal	Fiona Douskou	7,553	17.7	−4.1
Two-candidate-preferred result
Greens	Jenny Leong	28,015	62.1	+0.7
Labor	David Hetherington	17,094	37.9	−0.7
Greens hold		Swing	+0.7	

=== Elections in the 2010s ===
==== 2019 ====
2019 New South Wales state election: Newtown
Party	Candidate	Votes	%	±%
Greens	Jenny Leong	21,326	46.05	+0.48
Labor	Norma Ingram	12,202	26.35	−4.44
Liberal	Rohan Indraghanti	6,730	14.53	−3.25
Keep Sydney Open	Laura White	3,295	7.11	+7.11
Animal Justice	Michelle Buckmaster	1,105	2.39	+0.21
Sustainable Australia	Hugh Watson	967	2.09	+2.09
Small Business	Aaron Le Saux	687	1.48	+1.48
Total formal votes		46,312	97.88	+0.41
Informal votes		1,004	2.12	−0.41
Turnout		47,316	83.88	−2.58
Two-party-preferred result
Labor	Norma Ingram	28,960	77.66	+3.24
Liberal	Rohan Indraghanti	8,329	22.34	−3.24
Two-candidate-preferred result
Greens	Jenny Leong	24,849	63.83	+4.56
Labor	Norma Ingram	14,078	36.17	−4.56
Greens hold		Swing	+4.56	

==== 2015 ====
2015 New South Wales state election: Newtown
Party	Candidate	Votes	%	±%
Greens	Jenny Leong	20,689	45.6	+10.1
Labor	Penny Sharpe	13,978	30.8	+0.4
Liberal	Rachael Wheldall	8,074	17.8	−3.2
Animal Justice	Michael Walsh	989	2.2	+2.2
Cyclists	Noel McFarlane	828	1.8	+1.8
Christian Democrats	Karl Schubert	453	1.0	−0.1
No Land Tax	Dale Dinham	386	0.9	+0.9
Total formal votes		45,397	97.5	+0.1
Informal votes		1,179	2.5	−0.1
Turnout		46,576	86.5	+4.0
Notional two-party-preferred count
Labor	Penny Sharpe	27,526	74.4	+10.4
Liberal	Rachael Wheldall	9,461	25.6	−10.4
Two-candidate-preferred result
Greens	Jenny Leong	22,605	59.3	+4.8
Labor	Penny Sharpe	15,532	40.7	−4.8
Greens notional hold		Swing	+4.8	

Newtown was a new seat, partly replacing the abolished district of Marrickville. The member for Marrickville, Carmel Tebbutt (Labor), did not contest the election. Newtown was a notional Green seat as a result of the redistribution.

==== 1950–2015 ====
District abolished

=== Elections in the 1940s ===
==== 1947 ====
1947 New South Wales state election: Newtown
Party	Candidate	Votes	%	±%
Lang Labor	Lilian Fowler	9,446	47.0	−8.6
Labor	Arthur Greenup	9,264	46.1	+1.7
Communist	Freda Brown	1,367	6.8	+6.8
Total formal votes		20,077	97.6	+1.6
Informal votes		486	2.4	−1.6
Turnout		20,563	94.9	+3.2
Two-candidate-preferred result
Lang Labor	Lilian Fowler	10,135	50.5	−5.1
Labor	Arthur Greenup	9,942	49.5	+5.1
Lang Labor hold		Swing	−5.1	

==== 1944 ====
1944 New South Wales state election: Newtown
Party	Candidate	Votes	%	±%
Lang Labor	Lilian Fowler	9,989	55.6	+55.6
Labor	Frank Burke	7,987	44.4	−7.2
Total formal votes		17,976	96.0	−0.6
Informal votes		753	4.0	+0.6
Turnout		18,729	91.7	−0.1
Lang Labor gain from Labor		Swing	N/A	

==== 1941 ====
1941 New South Wales state election: Newtown
Party	Candidate	Votes	%	±%
Labor	Frank Burke	9,448	51.6	
Independent Labor	Lilian Fowler	5,877	32.1	
State Labor	Andrew Carruthers	2,970	16.2	
Total formal votes		18,295	96.6	
Informal votes		642	3.4	
Turnout		18,937	91.8	
Labor hold		Swing		

- Preferences were not distributed.

=== Elections in the 1930s ===
==== 1938 ====
1938 New South Wales state election: Newtown
Party	Candidate	Votes	%	±%
Labor	Frank Burke	11,757	70.9	+3.4
Independent	Cyril Glassop	4,831	29.1	+29.1
Total formal votes		16,588	97.1	0.0
Informal votes		503	2.9	0.0
Turnout		17,091	96.0	−0.9
Labor hold		Swing	N/A	

==== 1935 ====
1935 New South Wales state election: Newtown
Party	Candidate	Votes	%	±%
Labor (NSW)	Frank Burke	11,042	67.5	+0.3
Federal Labor	Joseph Bugler	5,318	32.5	+30.0
Total formal votes		16,360	97.1	0.0
Informal votes		490	2.9	0.0
Turnout		16,850	96.9	0.0
Labor (NSW) hold		Swing	N/A	

- Preferences were not distributed.

==== 1932 ====
1932 New South Wales state election: Newtown
Party	Candidate	Votes	%	±%
Labor (NSW)	Frank Burke	10,885	67.2	−16.2
United Australia	Robert Williams	4,605	28.4	+13.7
Federal Labor	Albert Clifton	409	2.5	+2.5
Communist	Jack Kavanagh	224	1.4	0.0
Independent	Henry Dawson	72	0.4	+0.4
Total formal votes		16,195	97.1	−0.6
Informal votes		483	2.9	+0.6
Turnout		16,678	96.6	+1.4
Labor (NSW) hold		Swing	N/A	

- Preferences were not distributed.

==== 1930 ====
1930 New South Wales state election: Newtown
Party	Candidate	Votes	%	±%
Labor	Frank Burke	13,395	83.9	
Nationalist	William Pickup	2,353	14.7	
Communist	Jack Kavanagh	224	1.4	
Total formal votes		15,972	97.7	
Informal votes		372	2.3	
Turnout		16,344	95.2	
Labor hold		Swing		

=== Elections in the 1920s ===
==== 1927 ====
1927 New South Wales state election: Newtown
Party	Candidate	Votes	%	±%
Labor	Frank Burke	8,686	74.6	
Nationalist	William Pickup	2,956	25.4	
Total formal votes		11,642	98.7	
Informal votes		155	1.3	
Turnout		11,797	80.7	
Labor win		(new seat)		

==== 1920–1927 ====
District abolished

=== Elections in the 1910s ===
==== 1917 ====
1917 New South Wales state election: Newtown
Party	Candidate	Votes	%	±%
Labor	Frank Burke	3,690	55.1	−10.5
Nationalist	Robert Hollis	2,654	39.6	+7.3
Independent	Tom Walsh	299	4.5	+4.5
Ind. Socialist Labor	John Kilburn	51	0.8	−1.3
Total formal votes		6,694	98.8	+0.8
Informal votes		82	1.2	−0.8
Turnout		6,776	58.2	−4.0
Labor hold				

The sitting member Robert Hollis was expelled from Labor in the November 1916 Labor split over conscription.

==== 1913 ====
1913 New South Wales state election: Newtown
Party	Candidate	Votes	%	±%
Labor	Robert Hollis	4,465	65.6	
Liberal Reform	Percy Stevens	2,198	32.3	
Australasian Socialist	Luke Jones	140	2.1	
Total formal votes		6,803	98.0	
Informal votes		141	2.0	
Turnout		6,944	62.2	
Labor hold				

==== 1910 ====
1910 New South Wales state election: Newtown
Party	Candidate	Votes	%	±%
Labour	Robert Hollis	4,221	62.7	
Liberal Reform	William Ferguson	2,492	37.0	
Independent	Patrick Quinn	22	0.3	
Total formal votes		6,735	97.4	
Informal votes		177	2.6	
Turnout		6,912	67.6	
Labour hold				

=== Elections in the 1900s ===
==== 1907 ====
1907 New South Wales state election: Newtown
Party	Candidate	Votes	%	±%
Labour	Robert Hollis	3,224	50.4	
Liberal Reform	Harold Morgan	3,150	49.3	
Independent	Patrick Quinn	20	0.3	
Total formal votes		6,394	97.6	
Informal votes		156	2.4	
Turnout		6,550	71.4	
Labour hold				

==== 1904 ====
1904 New South Wales state election: Newtown
Party	Candidate	Votes	%	±%
Labour	Robert Hollis	2,615	51.8	
Liberal Reform	Harold Morgan	2,411	47.7	
Socialist Labor	John Neill	27	0.5	
Total formal votes		5,053	99.3	
Informal votes		35	0.7	
Turnout		5,088	56.4	
Labour win		(new seat)		

Newtown was a re-created seat and consisted of parts of the abolished seats of Newtown-Erskine, Newtown-Camperdown and Newtown-St Peters. The member for Newtown-Erskine was Robert Hollis (Labour). The member for Newtown-Camperdown was James Smith (Independent Progressive) who successfully contested Camperdown. The member for Newtown-St Peters was James Fallick (Independent Liberal) who successfully contested Singleton as an official Liberal Reform candidate.

District recreated

==== 1894–1904 ====
District abolished

=== Elections in the 1890s ===
==== 1891 ====
1891 New South Wales colonial election: Newtown Wednesday 17 June
Party	Candidate	Votes	%	±%
Labour	Francis Cotton (elected 1)	2,572	14.1	
Labour	John Hindle (elected 2)	2,411	13.2	
Free Trade	Joseph Abbott (re-elected 3)	2,173	11.9	
Free Trade	Edmund Molesworth (re-elected 4)	2,136	11.7	
Free Trade	John Salmon	1,576	8.6	
Free Trade	Nicholas Hawken (defeated)	1,488	8.1	
Protectionist	Richard Bellemey	1,400	7.7	
Protectionist	Wilfred Blacket	1,353	7.4	
Independent	Thomas Midelton	1,327	7.3	
Protectionist	James Smith	1,098	6.0	
Ind. Free Trade	Marcus Clark	759	4.2	
Total formal votes		18,293	99.2	
Informal votes		140	0.8	
Turnout		5,555	68.1	
Labour win 1, gain 1 from Free Trade		(1 new seat)		
Free Trade hold 2		(1 new seat)		

=== Elections in the 1880s ===
==== 1889 ====
1889 New South Wales colonial election: Newtown Saturday 2 February
Party	Candidate	Votes	%	±%
Free Trade	Joseph Abbott (elected 1)	2,747	21.0	
Free Trade	Edmund Molesworth (elected 2)	2,690	20.6	
Free Trade	Nicholas Hawken (elected 3)	2,634	20.1	
Protectionist	James Smith	1,722	13.2	
Protectionist	Richard Bellemey	1,693	12.9	
Protectionist	James Angus	1,604	12.3	
Total formal votes		13,090	99.4	
Informal votes		80	0.6	
Turnout		4,909	69.0	
Free Trade hold 3				

==== 1888 by-election 2 ====
1888 Newtown by-election Saturday 25 February
Party	Candidate	Votes	%	±%
Free Trade	Joseph Mitchell (elected)	2,064	51.9	
Protectionist	James Smith	1,917	48.2	
Total formal votes		3,981	99.0	+0.6
Informal votes		42	1.0	−0.6
Turnout		4,023	59.5	+3.9
Free Trade hold		Swing		

William Foster (Free Trade) was appointed a judge of the Supreme Court.

==== 1888 by-election 1 ====
1888 Newtown by-election 1 Friday 3 February
Party	Candidate	Votes	%	±%
Free Trade	Joseph Abbott (elected)	1,890	51.1	
Protectionist	James Smith	1,809	48.9	
Total formal votes		3,699	98.4	−1.0
Informal votes		62	1.7	+1.0
Turnout		3,761	55.6	−0.7
Free Trade hold				

Frederick Gibbes (Free Trade) died.

==== 1887 ====
1887 New South Wales colonial election: Newtown Saturday 5 February
Party	Candidate	Votes	%	±%
Free Trade	William Foster (re-elected 1)	2,404	29.6	
Free Trade	Frederick Gibbes (re-elected 2)	2,321	28.6	
Free Trade	Nicholas Hawken (elected 3)	2,106	26.0	
Protectionist	James Smith (defeated)	1,284	15.8	
Total formal votes		8,115	99.3	
Informal votes		57	0.7	
Turnout		3,446	56.3	

==== 1885 ====
1885 New South Wales colonial election: Newtown Friday 16 October
Candidate	Votes	%
William Foster (elected 1)	1,906	23.6
James Smith (elected 2)	1,899	23.5
Frederick Gibbes (re-elected 3)	1,731	21.4
Richard Bellemey	1,154	14.3
Nicholas Hawken	726	9.0
Joseph Mitchell (defeated)	668	8.3
Total formal votes	8,084	99.1
Informal votes	71	0.9
Turnout	3,515	65.0
	(1 new seat)	

==== 1883 by-election ====
1883 Newtown by-election Saturday 13 January
Candidate	Votes	%
Joseph Mitchell (elected)	1,249	50.7
Henry Copeland (defeated)	1,217	49.4
Total formal votes	2,466	100.0
Informal votes	0	0.0
Turnout	2,466	64.7

Henry Copeland was appointed Secretary for Public Works in the Stuart ministry.

==== 1882 ====
1882 New South Wales colonial election: Newtown Saturday 2 December
Candidate	Votes	%
Frederick Gibbes (elected 1)	1,209	29.4
Henry Copeland (re-elected 2)	976	23.7
William Foster (defeated)	966	23.5
Joseph Mitchell (defeated)	960	23.4
Total formal votes	4,111	99.5
Informal votes	20	0.5
Turnout	2,429	63.7

Henry Copeland was the member for New England to challenge William Foster, the Minister for Justice. Joseph Mitchell subsequently contested Canterbury but was again unsuccessful.

==== 1881 by-election ====
1881 Newtown by-election Thursday 1 December
Candidate	Votes	%
Joseph Mitchell (elected)	1,091	75.9
Thomas Dalveen	346	24.1
Total formal votes	1,437	98.2
Informal votes	27	1.8
Turnout	1,464	41.5

Stephen Brown was appointed to the Legislative Council.

==== 1880 ====
1880 New South Wales colonial election: Newtown Monday 22 November
Candidate	Votes	%
Stephen Brown (re-elected 1)	1,545	36.3
William Foster (elected 2)	1,281	30.1
John Young	844	19.8
Joseph Mitchell	588	13.8
Total formal votes	4,258	99.0
Informal votes	42	1.0
Turnout	2,171	64.3
	(1 new seat)	

=== Elections in the 1870s ===
==== 1877 ====
1877 New South Wales colonial election: Newtown Saturday 27 October
Candidate	Votes	%
Stephen Brown (re-elected)	1,083	82.7
James Yeomans	227	17.3
Total formal votes	1,310	100.0
Informal votes	0	0.0
Turnout	1,310	39.3

==== 1874 ====
1874–75 New South Wales colonial election: Newtown Monday 14 December 1874
Candidate	Votes	%
Stephen Brown (re-elected)	unopposed	

==== 1872 ====
1872 New South Wales colonial election: Newtown Monday 4 March
Candidate	Votes	%
Stephen Brown (re-elected)	1,125	92.6
Edward Flood	81	6.7
Elias Bethel	9	0.7
Total formal votes	1,215	100.0
Informal votes	0	0.0
Turnout	1,215	46.6

=== Elections in the 1860s ===
==== 1869 ====
1869–70 New South Wales colonial election: Newtown Friday 10 December 1869
Candidate	Votes	%
Stephen Brown (re-elected)	925	60.4
Patrick Shepherd	606	39.6
Total formal votes	1,531	100.0
Informal votes	0	0.0
Turnout	1,531	63.3

==== 1864 ====
1864–65 New South Wales colonial election: Newtown Wednesday 7 December 1864
Candidate	Votes	%
Stephen Brown (elected)	unopposed	

==== 1861 by-election ====
1861 Newtown by-election Friday 12 July
Candidate	Votes	%
Thomas Holt (elected)	470	51.4
Stephen Brown	445	48.6
Total formal votes	915	100.0
Informal votes	0	0.0
Turnout	915	54.6

Alexander McArthur was appointed to the Legislative Council.

==== 1860 ====
1860 New South Wales colonial election: Newtown Monday 17 December
Candidate	Votes	%
Alexander McArthur (re-elected)	493	55.2
Stephen Brown	401	44.9
Total formal votes	894	100.0
Informal votes	0	0.0
Turnout	894	51.8

=== Elections in the 1850s ===
==== 1859 ====
1859 New South Wales colonial election: Newtown Friday 17 June
Candidate	Votes	%
Alexander McArthur (elected)	354	37.5
Stephen Brown	222	23.5
Edward Hill	219	23.2
Thomas Holt	149	15.8
Total formal votes	944	100.0
Informal votes	0	0.0
Turnout	944	63.3
