= Electoral results for the district of Newtown-Camperdown =

Election results for Newtown-Camperdown, New South Wales, Australia

Newtown-Camperdown, an electoral district of the Legislative Assembly in the Australian state of New South Wales was created in 1894 and abolished in 1904.

Election	Member	Party
1894	Joseph Abbott	Free Trade
1895	Francis Cotton	Free Trade
1898	Francis Cotton	Free Trade
1901	James Smith	Ind. Progressive

== Election results ==
=== Elections in the 1900s ===
==== 1901 ====
1901 New South Wales state election: Newtown-Camperdown
Party	Candidate	Votes	%	±%
Ind. Progressive	James Smith	759	35.1	+10.2
Liberal Reform	Thomas Probert	562	26.0	−1.3
Independent Liberal	William Clegg	382	17.7	
Labour	Samuel Heaton	270	12.5	+7.2
Independent Liberal	Richard Bellemey	165	7.6	
Socialist Labor	Andrew Thomson	24	1.1	
Total formal votes		2,162	99.0	+0.5
Informal votes		22	1.0	−0.5
Turnout		2,184	62.6	+0.8
Ind. Progressive gain from Liberal Reform				

The sitting member was Francis Cotton (Liberal Reform) who did not contest the election.

=== Elections in the 1890s ===
==== 1898 ====
1898 New South Wales colonial election: Newtown-Camperdown
Party	Candidate	Votes	%	±%
Free Trade	Francis Cotton	471	27.2	
Independent Federalist	James Smith	431	24.9	
Independent Federalist	George Spark	374	21.6	
National Federal	James Abigail	350	20.2	
Labour	Edward Riley	91	5.3	
Independent Federalist	Thomas Evans	9	0.5	
Independent	Mikael Dunn	3	0.2	
Total formal votes		1,729	98.5	
Informal votes		27	1.5	
Turnout		1,756	61.8	
Free Trade hold				

==== 1895 ====
1895 New South Wales colonial election: Newtown-Camperdown
Party	Candidate	Votes	%	±%
Free Trade	Francis Cotton	530	38.4	
Protectionist	James Smith	450	32.6	
Labour	Edward Riley	214	15.5	
Ind. Free Trade	Joseph Mitchell	188	13.6	
Total formal votes		1,382	98.8	
Informal votes		17	1.2	
Turnout		1,399	61.7	
Free Trade hold				

==== 1894 ====
1894 New South Wales colonial election: Newtown-Camperdown
Party	Candidate	Votes	%	±%
Free Trade	Joseph Abbott	852	46.7	
Labour	Benjamin Morgan	554	30.4	
Protectionist	James Smith	355	19.5	
Ind. Free Trade	John Cotton	63	3.5	
Total formal votes		1,824	98.3	
Informal votes		32	1.7	
Turnout		1,856	81.7	
Free Trade win		(new seat)		

Newtown was split into four, Newtown-Camperdown, Newtown-Erskine, Newtown-St Peters and Marrickville. Joseph Abbott (Free Trade) was a sitting members for Newtown, while the other three sitting members contested Newtown-St Peters and Newtown-Erskine.
