= Electoral results for the district of Newtown-Erskine =

Election results for Newtown-Erskine, New South Wales, Australia

Newtown-Erskine, an electoral district of the Legislative Assembly in the Australian state of New South Wales was created in 1894 and abolished in 1904.

Election	Member	Party
1894	Edmund Molesworth	Free Trade
1895	Edmund Molesworth	Free Trade
1898	Edmund Molesworth	Free Trade
1901	Robert Hollis	Labor

== Election results ==
=== Elections in the 1900s ===
==== 1901 ====
1901 New South Wales state election: Newtown-Erskine
Party	Candidate	Votes	%	±%
Labour	Robert Hollis	921	49.7	
Liberal Reform	Edmund Molesworth	886	47.8	−13.5
Independent Liberal	Leopold Bertram	46	2.5	+2.5
Total formal votes		1,853	99.3	−0.5
Informal votes		14	0.8	+0.5
Turnout		1,867	61.0	+1.3
Labour gain from Liberal Reform				

=== Elections in the 1890s ===
==== 1898 ====
1898 New South Wales colonial election: Newtown-Erskine
Party	Candidate	Votes	%	±%
Free Trade	Edmund Molesworth	860	61.3	
National Federal	Harold Morgan	542	38.7	
Total formal votes		1,402	99.8	
Informal votes		3	0.2	
Turnout		1,405	59.7	
Free Trade hold				

==== 1895 ====
1895 New South Wales colonial election: Newtown-Erskine
Party	Candidate	Votes	%	±%
Free Trade	Edmund Molesworth	663	54.8	
Labour	Robert Hollis	546	45.2	
Total formal votes		1,209	99.1	
Informal votes		11	0.9	
Turnout		1,220	62.6	
Free Trade hold				

==== 1894 ====
1894 New South Wales colonial election: Newtown-Erskine
Party	Candidate	Votes	%	±%
Free Trade	Edmund Molesworth	747	48.1	
Labour	Robert Hollis	687	44.2	
Ind. Free Trade	John Hindle	106	6.8	
Ind. Protectionist	John Davis	14	0.9	
Total formal votes		1,554	98.9	
Informal votes		18	1.2	
Turnout		1,572	80.2	
Free Trade win		(new seat)		

Newtown was split into four, Newtown-Camperdown, Newtown-Erskine, Newtown-St Peters and Marrickville. Edmund Molesworth (Free Trade) and John Hindle (Labour) were both sitting members for Newtown, while the other two sitting members contested Newtown-Camperdown and Newtown-St Peters.
