= 1888 Newtown colonial by-election =

1888 Newtown colonial by-election may refer to

- 1888 Newtown colonial by-election 1 held on 3 February 1888
- 1888 Newtown colonial by-election 2 held on 25 February 1888

== See also ==
- List of New South Wales state by-elections
