= 25 February 1888 Newtown colonial by-election =

By-election in New South Wales, Australia

A by-election was held for the New South Wales Legislative Assembly electorate of Newtown on 25 February 1888. The election was triggered by the resignation of William Foster, a member of the Free Trade Party, who had accepted appointment as a judge of the Supreme Court.

== Dates ==
| Date | Event |
|---|---|
| 14 February 1888 | Resignation of William Foster. |
| 15 February 1888 | Writ of election issued by the Speaker of the Legislative Assembly. |
| 22 February 1888 | Nominations |
| 25 February 1888 | Polling day |
| 29 February 1888 | Return of writ |

== Results ==
1888 Newtown by-election Saturday 25 February
| Party | Candidate | Votes | % | ±% |
|---|---|---|---|---|
| Free Trade | Joseph Mitchell (elected) | 2,064 | 51.9 | |
| Protectionist | James Smith | 1,917 | 48.2 | |
| Total formal votes | | 3,981 | 99.0 | +0.6 |
| Informal votes | | 42 | 1.0 | −0.6 |
| Turnout | | 4,023 | 59.5 | +3.9 |
| Free Trade hold | | Swing | | |

== See also ==
- Electoral results for the district of Newtown
- List of New South Wales state by-elections
