= 1881 Newtown colonial by-election =

By-election in New South Wales, Australia

A by-election was held for the New South Wales Legislative Assembly electorate of Newtown on 1 December 1881. The election was triggered by the appointment of Stephen Brown to the Legislative Council, taking up the office of Postmaster-General.

The Carcoar by-election was held the same day.

== Dates ==
| Date | Event |
|---|---|
| 15 November 1881 | Stephen Brown appointed to Legislative Council and Postmaster-General. |
| 16 November 1881 | Writ of election issued by the Speaker of the Legislative Assembly. |
| 29 November 1881 | Nominations |
| 1 December 1881 | Polling day |
| 6 December 1881 | Return of writ |

== Results ==
1881 Newtown by-election Thursday 1 December
| Candidate | Votes | % |
|---|---|---|
| Joseph Mitchell (elected) | 1,091 | 75.9 |
| Thomas Dalveen | 346 | 24.1 |
| Total formal votes | 1,437 | 98.2 |
| Informal votes | 27 | 1.8 |
| Turnout | 1,464 | 41.5 |

== See also ==
- Electoral results for the district of Newtown
- List of New South Wales state by-elections
