= 1861 Newtown colonial by-election =

By-election in New South Wales, Australia

A by-election was held for the New South Wales Legislative Assembly electorate of Newtown on 12 July 1861 because of the resignation of Alexander McArthur who had been appointed to the Legislative Council.

== Candidates ==
Two candidates were nominated:

- Thomas Holt, a pastoralist, had represented Stanley Boroughs in 1856–1857, however he had been defeated at the elections for Cumberland (South Riding) in 1858 and Newtown in 1859.
- Stephen Brown, a solicitor, had also been defeated at the election Newtown in 1859 and again in 1860.

== Dates ==
Date	Event
20 June 1861	Alexander McArthur resigned.
24 June 1861	Writ of election issued by the Speaker of the Legislative Assembly and close of electoral rolls.
10 July 1861	Nominations
12 July 1861	Polling day
17 July 1861	Return of writ

== Results ==
1861 Newtown by-election Friday 12 July
Candidate	Votes	%
Thomas Holt (elected)	470	51.4
Stephen Brown	445	48.6
Total formal votes	915	100.0
Informal votes	0	0.0
Turnout	915	54.6

== See also ==
- Electoral results for the district of Newtown
- List of New South Wales state by-elections
