= Municipality of Darlington =

Former local government area in New South Wales, Australia

- Local government area
- Map of Darlington Municipality from the Atlas of the Suburbs of Sydney, c. 1885.
- Country: Australia
- State: New South Wales
- Region: Inner West
- Established: 11 August 1864
- Abolished: 31 December 1948
- Council seat: Darlington Town Hall

Area
  - Total: 0.2 km^{2} (0.077 sq mi)

Population
  - Total: 3,032 (1947 census)
  - Density: 15,000/km^{2} (39,000/sq mi)
- Parish: Petersham
LGAs around Municipality of Darlington
	Sydney
Camperdown	Municipality of Darlington	Redfern
Newtown		Redfern

The Municipality of Darlington was a local government area of Sydney, New South Wales, Australia. The municipality was proclaimed in 1864 and, with an area of 0.2 square kilometres, was the smallest municipal council in Sydney. It included the entire suburb of Darlington, excepting a small block between Golden Grove and Forbes streets, which was administered by the Municipality of Redfern in Golden Grove Ward. The council was amalgamated, along with most of its neighbours, with the City of Sydney to the north with the passing of the Local Government (Areas) Act 1948. From 1968 to 1982 and from 1989 to 2004, the area was part of the South Sydney councils.

== Council history ==
In 1842 Cleveland Street, Sydney was gazetted as the boundary road for the Sydney Municipality and by 1864 residents south of the street had petitioned to become part of the Sydney Council area. When their request was rejected, 104 residents of the Darlington area submitted a further petition to the Governor, Sir John Young, which asked for the establishment of a new municipality south of Cleveland Street. The Governor declared the establishment of the Municipality on 11 August 1864, which was published in the NSW Government Gazette five days later. The first meeting of the electors occurred on 16 September 1864, with Charles Muzio Deane elected as the first Chairman and Aaron Loveridge, Thomas Shepherd, Robert Maze, John Williams and Frederick Williams as Aldermen. George Pile became the first Town Clerk. Under the enactment of the Municipalities Act, 1867', the title of "Chairman" for the council was changed to be "Mayor" and the council was renamed as the Borough of Darlington. From 28 December 1906, following the passing of the Local Government Act, 1906, the council was again renamed as the "Municipality of Darlington".

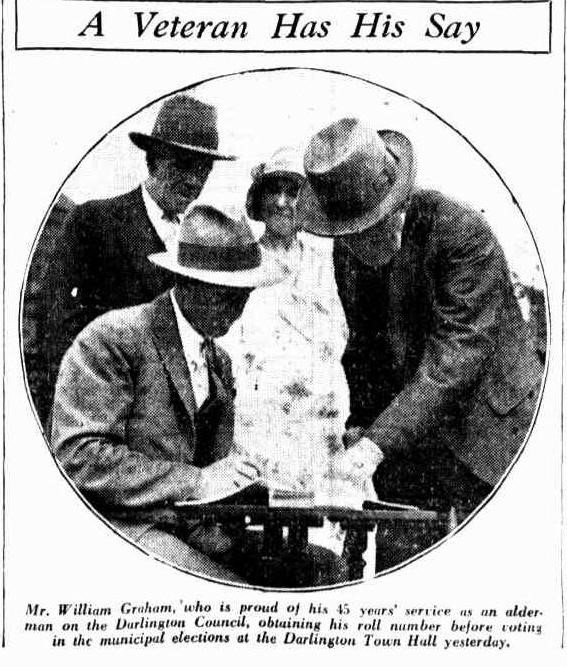
Ald. William Graham (standing, right), marking his 46th year of council service, obtaining his roll number before voting in the 1932 council election.

The municipality was characterised by stable, and, for the most part, non-partisan, councils, which was often in direct contrast to its neighbours: Redfern and Newtown were often divided, especially over choosing a mayor, and Camperdown Council had declared insolvency and was absorbed into Sydney City Council in 1908. Darlington had many long-serving mayors and aldermen, such as Alderman William Graham (1849–1933), who served on the council from 1887 to his death in May 1933, a record total of 47 years service which included four terms as mayor. The boundaries of Darlington Council were expanded due to a transfer with Camperdown in 1906, bringing the boundary of the council up to Newtown Road. Further minor boundary transfers were made with Redfern in 1920 and Sydney in 1931.

By the end of the Second World War, the NSW Government had realised that its ideas of infrastructure expansion could not be realised by the present system of the mostly-poor inner-city municipal councils and the Minister for Local Government, Joseph Cahill, pushed through a bill in 1948 that abolished a significant number of those councils. Darlington was abolished and amalgamated with the City of Sydney following the enactment of the Local Government (Areas) Act 1948, which came into effect from 1 January 1949. The former council area subsequently became part of the South Sydney Municipality from 1968 to 1982 and from 1988 to 1992.

== Mayors ==
Nicholas Hawken (1836–1908), Mayor 1881–1884, Member of Parliament for Newtown 1887–1891.

Years	Chairman	Notes
16 September 1864 – 23 December 1867	Charles Muzio Deane	
Years	Mayors	Notes
23 December 1867 – February 1869	Charles Muzio Deane	
February 1869 – 8 February 1876	Robert Maze	
8 February 1876 – 13 February 1879	Henry Hargreaves	
13 February 1879 – 5 February 1881	William Elvy	
5 February 1881 – 13 February 1884	Nicholas Hawken	
13 February 1884 – 11 February 1885	Thomas Warren	
11 February 1885 – 10 February 1886	Freeman Pepper	
10 February 1886 – 8 February 1887	William Crispin	
8 February 1887 – 17 February 1888	James Henry Beale	
17 February 1888 – 14 February 1890	William Crispin	
14 February 1890 – 12 February 1901	James Spring	
12 February 1901 – 11 February 1903	Samuel Partridge Hudson Cover	
11 February 1903 – 9 February 1904	William Best	
9 February 1904 – 10 February 1908	James Spring	
10 February 1908 – February 1909	Edward Ranson	
February 1909 – February 1910	Henry Neatby Vaughan	
February 1910 – February 1911	William Graham	
February 1911 – February 1912	Arthur Selwyn Elvy	
February 1912 – February 1913	William De Putron	
February 1913 – February 1915	William Graham	
February 1915 – February 1916	William Best	
February 1916 – February 1920	Arthur Selwyn Elvy	
February 1920 – December 1920	James Pope Melville	
December 1920 – December 1921	Michael Madigan	
December 1921 – December 1924	Arthur Selwyn Elvy	
December 1924 – December 1925	William Graham	
December 1925 – December 1926	Arthur Selwyn Elvy	
December 1926 – December 1929	James Pope Melville	
December 1929 – December 1930	Arthur Selwyn Elvy	
December 1930 – December 1931	James Pope Melville	
December 1931 – December 1937	Arthur Selwyn Elvy	
December 1937 – December 1939	Albert Edward Elvy	
December 1939 – December 1940	Ambrose James Coady	
December 1940 – December 1943	Arthur Selwyn Elvy	
December 1943 – December 1945	Albert Edward Elvy	
December 1945 – 31 December 1948	Morris Perkins	

== Town Clerks ==
Years	Town Clerk	Notes
1864 – December 1865	George Pile, Junior	
January 1866 – 17 November 1869	Samuel Partridge	
2 December 1869 – 18 February 1871	William Ferguson Reid	
18 February 1871 – 16 January 1879	Charles Harris	
16 January 1879 – 3 July 1879	John McFarlane (acting)	
3 July 1879 – 17 May 1902	John Whitehead	
28 May 1902 – 1917	Thomas Phillips Gibson	
1917–1928	Charles Henry Turtle	
1928–1946	F. Cooper	
1946 – 31 December 1948	R. Deacon	

== Town Hall ==
Darlington Town Hall
- Darlington Town Hall, pictured by Sam Hood, 16 July 1931.

General information
- Location: Darlington Road, Darlington, Sydney, New South Wales, Australia
- Opened: 2 January 1879
- Demolished: 1975

The council first met in Harris' School in Rose Street, Darlington, before moving to other premises on the same street, which were occupied until 1 August 1878, when it was decided to build a Town Hall on a site on Darlington Road. This site, with the Darlington Public School situated next door, was first used from 2 January 1879. With the sacrifice of many Darlington residents in the First World War, the council commissioned a Roll of Honour for the Town Hall, which was unveiled by Mayor A. S. Elvy on 16 March 1918.

A Memorial Tablet commemorating the former Darlington resident and Victoria Cross recipient, Captain Alfred Shout, was made by Anthony Hordern and unveiled on 20 November 1915 by the Governor General Sir Ronald Munro Ferguson at the Town Hall. With the completion of a new facade for the Town Hall, the tablet was inset into the front of the building completed in 1925. It is now displayed at Victoria Barracks Museum, Paddington. The Town Hall was expanded in 1925 and included the erection of a social hall, designed by Newcastle-based architects Thomas J. Pepper & Jeater, built by H. Greathead of Marrickville, with electric lighting installed by Field Bros. of Marrickville.

The Town Hall was acquired by the University of Sydney in 1961 as part of its significant expansion to the south, which included a large part of Darlington. The Hall continued to operate as a social hall and venue until its closure in 1972 and was demolished in 1975 along with 650 houses and other Darlington buildings in controversial expansions undertaken by the university that reduced the population of the suburb by 2,000.

== See also ==
- Nicholas Hawken, Darlington Alderman for 15 years, Mayor (1881–1883), Member of Parliament for Newtown (1887–1891), MLC (1899–1908).
