= List of mayors of Newtown =

People who served as the mayor of the Municipality of Newtown are:

William Rigg, Mayor (1892–1895, 1898–1899, 1911–1913), MLA for Newtown-St Peters (1894–1901).

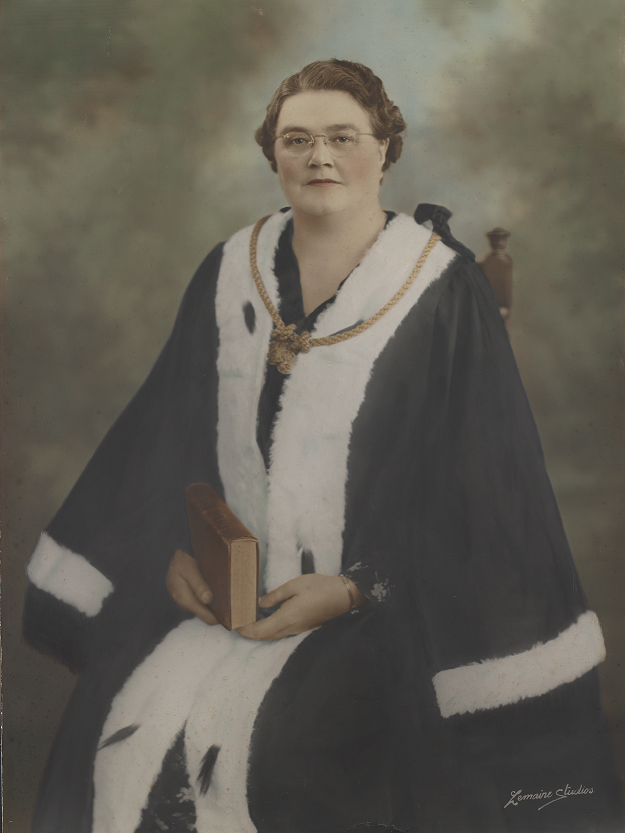
Lilian Fowler, Mayor (1938–1939), first female mayor in Australia, MLA for Newtown (1944–1950).

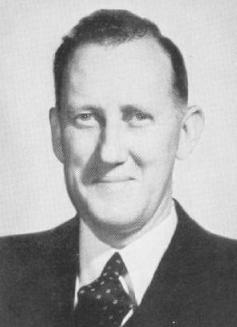
Arthur Greenup, Mayor (1941–1943), MLA for Newtown-Annandale (1950–1953) and MHR for Dalley (1953–1955).

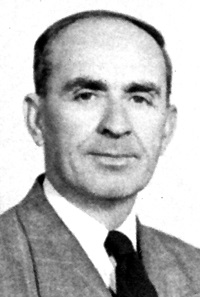
Ernie Wright, final Mayor (1948), MLC (1943–1973) and Chairman of Committees (1953–1967).

Years	Chairmen	Notes
17 February 1863 – 16 February 1864	Frederick William Holland	
16 February 1864 – 24 February 1865	Joseph Kingsbury	
24 February 1865 – 14 February 1866	Henry Munro	
14 February 1866 – February 1867	William Curtis	
February 1867 – February 1868	James Conley	
Years	Mayors	Notes
15 February 1868 – 13 February 1869	Henry Munro	
13 February 1869 – 15 February 1870	William Curtis	
15 February 1870 – 16 February 1871	Joseph Kingsbury	
16 February 1871 – 17 February 1877	William Bailey	
17 February 1877 – 14 February 1878	James Smith	
14 February 1878 – 15 February 1879	Alfred Fallick	
15 February 1879 – 16 February 1880	James Smith	
16 February 1880 – 9 February 1881	Daniel Wildman	
9 February 1881 – 15 February 1882	Charles Whately	
15 February 1882 – 14 February 1883	Ninian Melville	
14 February 1883 – February 1884	Charles Boots	
February 1884 – 13 February 1886	James Smith	
13 February 1886 – 9 February 1887	Charles Whately	
9 February 1887 – 13 February 1889	Richard Bellemey	
13 February 1889 – 13 February 1890	Joseph Jolly	
13 February 1890 – 28 October 1890	Charles James Lane	
28 October 1890 – 10 February 1892	William Dolman	
10 February 1892 – 14 February 1895	William Rigg	
14 February 1895 – 14 February 1896	Harold Thomas Morgan	
14 February 1896 – 12 February 1897	James Smith	
12 February 1897 – 9 February 1898	William Cox	
9 February 1898 – 18 February 1899	William Rigg	
18 February 1899 – 16 February 1900	Charles Henry Ibbotson	
16 February 1900 – 14 February 1902	John Salmon	
14 February 1902 – 10 February 1903	Harold Thomas Morgan	
10 February 1903 – 10 February 1905	John Salmon	
10 February 1905 – 15 February 1906	William Edwards	
15 February 1906 – 14 February 1907	Henry Nunn Howe	
14 February 1907 – February 1911	Harold Thomas Morgan	
February 1911 – 3 February 1913	William Rigg	
3 February 1913 – February 1916	Frank Bamfield	
February 1916 – 5 February 1918	Charles Henry Turtle	
5 February 1918 – December 1920	Harold Thomas Morgan	
December 1920 – December 1921	James Campbell	
December 1921 – December 1923	William Henry Pritchard	
December 1923 – December 1924	Nicholas Buzacott	
December 1924 – December 1925	William Alfred Dibble	
December 1925 – December 1926	Isidore Edwin Ryan (ALP)	
December 1926 – December 1927	William Leslie Smith	
December 1927 – 11 December 1928	William Henry Delve	
11 December 1928 – 10 December 1929	Joseph Solomon (ALP)	
10 December 1929 – 11 December 1930	Reuben Sydney Goddard (ALP)	
11 December 1930 – 2 January 1932	Joseph Vincent Bugler (ALP)	
6 January 1932 – December 1932	Frederick Benedict Roberts (ALP)	
December 1932 – December 1933	Frederick Newnham (ALP)	
December 1933 – December 1934	Isidore Edwin Ryan (ALP)	
December 1934 – December 1935	Reuben Sydney Goddard (ALP)	
December 1935 – 2 December 1936	Horace Raymond Dunshea (ALP)	
2 December 1936 – December 1937	Frederick Newnham (ALP)	
December 1937 – December 1938	Isidore Edwin Ryan (ALP)	
December 1938 – December 1939	Lilian Fowler (ALP)	
December 1939 – December 1940	Raymond Jules Beaufils (ALP)	
December 1940 – 10 December 1941	Isidore Edwin Ryan (ALP)	
10 December 1941 – December 1943	Arthur Greenup (ALP)	
December 1943 – 5 December 1944	Patrick Joseph Walters (ALP)	
5 December 1944 – 4 December 1945	Sidney Augustus Fleming (ALP)	
4 December 1945 – 6 December 1946	George Henry Smith (ALP)	
6 December 1946 – 3 December 1947	William Francis Bodkin (ALP)	
3 December 1947 – 7 July 1948	Reuben Sidney Goddard (ALP)	
27 July 1948 – 31 December 1948	Ernest Gerard Wright (ALP)	
