= 3 February 1888 Newtown colonial by-election =

By-election in New South Wales, Australia

A by-election was held for the New South Wales Legislative Assembly electorate of Newtown on 3 February 1888 because of the death of Frederick Gibbes (Free Trade).

== Dates ==
Date	Event
17 January 1888	Death of Frederick Gibbes.
23 January 1888	Writ of election issued by the Speaker of the Legislative Assembly.
31 January 1888	Nominations
3 February 1888	Polling day
7 February 1888	Return of writ

== Results ==
1888 Newtown by-election 1 Friday 3 February
Party	Candidate	Votes	%	±%
Free Trade	Joseph Abbott (elected)	1,890	51.1	
Protectionist	James Smith	1,809	48.9	
Total formal votes		3,699	98.4	−1.0
Informal votes		62	1.7	+1.0
Turnout		3,761	55.6	−0.7
Free Trade hold				

== See also ==
- Electoral results for the district of Newtown
- List of New South Wales state by-elections
