= Francis Cotton (politician) =

Australian politician

Member for Newtown (NSW Legislative Assembly)
- In office 17 June 1891 – 25 June 1894

Member for Newtown-Camperdown (NSW Legislative Assembly)
- In office 24 July 1895 – 8 July 1898

Member for Newtown-Camperdown (NSW Legislative Assembly)
- In office 27 July 1898 – 11 June 1901

Personal details
- Born: 5 May 1857 Adelaide, South Australia
- Died: 28 November 1942 (aged 85) Lindfield, New South Wales
- Spouse: Evangeline Mary Geake Lane
- Parents: Richard Cotton (father); Esther Ann (née Payne) (mother)

Francis Cotton (5 May 1857 – 28 November 1942) was an Australian politician and a strong advocate of Henry George's 'single tax' ideas, which advocated for taxation of unimproved land values.

Cotton's role as a union organiser gave him prominence in the formation of a political party representing the labour movement. He was a member of the sub-committee that determined the rules and platform of the New South Wales Labor Electoral League, the forerunner of the Australian Labour Party (ALP). In June 1891 Cotton was amongst the initial group of Labor party members elected to the New South Wales Legislative Assembly.

Cotton's uncompromising dedication to Georgian economics and his advocacy of free trade led to disputes with supporters of protectionism within the labour movement. In 1894, along with the majority of Labor parliamentary members, he refused to sign the solidarity pledge to abide by caucus decisions, and was ousted from the Labor party. Cotton lost his seat at the 1894 general election but was re-elected as a Free Trade Party candidate in 1895 and remained in parliament until 1901.

== Biography ==
=== Early years ===
Francis Cotton was born on 5 May 1857 in Adelaide, in the colony of South Australia, the son of Richard Cotton and Esther Ann (née Payne). His father was a grocer. In 1860, as a young child, Francis lived with his parents at 'Warroo' station, "a lonely pastoral outpost" at the southern extremity of the Eyre Peninsula near Coffin Bay.

When he was aged fifteen Francis was educated at the Prince Alfred College in Adelaide, an independent school established by the Wesleyan Methodist Church. He left school after two years and worked on a cattle station near Port Lincoln.

=== New South Wales ===
In about 1874 Cotton, aged seventeen, left South Australia and settled in the Forbes district, on the Lachlan River in the western district of New South Wales, where he had a varied experience as a shearer, a drover and a miner. Working as a drover, he traveled through the back country between the Lachlan and the Macquarie and Castlereagh river systems. Cotton was also part of a prospecting party searching for alluvial gold in the country north-west of Forbes in the Fifield, Nymagee and Cobar districts. Cotton was a "voracious reader" with a particular interest in social and political economic theories.

Francis Cotton and Evangeline Mary Geake Lane were married on 1 January 1883 at Forbes. The couple had six children, three girls and three boys, born from 1884 to 1894. Their first child, Leo, was born in 1884 at Nymagee, 155 miles (250 km) north-west of Forbes.

In February 1886 Frank Cotton was appointed to the position of poundkeeper at Nymagee. By 1887 Cotton was working as a market gardener.

The Land Nationalisation Association of New South Wales was formed at Forbes on 26 January 1887. In February 1887 at Forbes Cotton delivered the inaugural address to the Association on the topic of Henry George and his economic theories. George's economic philosophy advocated that a single tax on land values would create a more productive and just society. The basis of his ideology was a belief that people should own the full value of what they produce (labour and capital), but that the economic value of land (including natural resources) should belong equally to all members of society. Cotton's speech was later published under the title The Prophet of San Francisco and Other Sketches. Cotton's older brother, John William Cotton, held the position of "press correspondent" within the Land Nationalisation Association. In a manifesto of the organisation published in June 1887, it was explained that the Land Nationalisation Association sought to establish affiliated leagues within each electorate of the colony to bring the principles of the Association before the public and ultimately give expression to those principles through the ballot-box. The office-bearers of the Forbes League, in addition to president, vice-president, treasurer and secretary, included a lecturer, press correspondent and electoral scrutineer. Cotton assisted in the establishment of The Australian Land Nationaliser newspaper in Lithgow.

In November 1887 the Murrumbidgee Land Tax Association was formed at Wagga Wagga, with the objects of preventing "the further alienation of the national estate" and "advocating the taxation of land values on the principle laid down by Henry George", replacing all existing methods of raising revenue by a tax on land values only. In December 1887 Cotton was invited to deliver a lecture to the Association at Wagga Wagga on the subject of taxing land values.

Cotton's booklet The Prophet of San Francisco and Other Sketches was published in 1888. The principal portion of the publication was the text of his inaugural address to the Land Nationisation Association of New South Wales, delivered in February 1887 at Forbes.

In about 1889 Cotton relocated to Sydney and made his living as a journalist. At various times he was on the staff of The Sunday Times, The Evening News and The World's News.

In January 1889 the Sydney branch of the Land Naturalisation League voted to change their name to the Single Tax League.

As an advocate of free trade and Henry George's single-tax ideas, during 1889 Cotton was briefly active in the Freetrade and Liberal Association of New South Wales, a middle-class organisation that had taken steps to organise as a political party. Cotton sought to influence the organisation to adopt Georgian principles in its party platform. In late August 1889 Cotton was a featured speaker at a meeting in Sydney of the Freetrade and Liberal Association. A report of the meeting described him as "the ardent young apostle of the single tax".

=== Henry George's visit ===
A cartoon reflecting the dominant political issue of the 1890s in the Australian colonies, free trade vs. protectionism; 'St. (Henry) George and the Dragon' by Livingston Hopkins, published in The Bulletin, 15 March 1890.

In October 1889 it was announced that Henry George, the American political economist, would travel to Australia in 1890 for a lecture tour. The Single Tax League planned a series of public meetings "preparing the way for his visit". The first was held in the Temperance Hall in Pitt Street in Sydney, at which Cotton was one of the speakers.

Henry George arrived at Sydney on 6 March 1890 aboard the steamer SS Mariposa from San Francisco. On the evening of the following day a banquet in his honour was held in the vestibule of the Sydney Town Hall by the New South Wales Single Tax League, attended by about "two hundred gentlemen", including many delegates from country branches. On the evening of 8 March George began his Australian lecture tour by delivering the first of four "anti-poverty lectures" in Sydney. The initial lectures were held in the Exhibition Building in Prince Alfred Park and the Protestant Hall in Castlereagh Street (with the events being chaired by Cotton).

On 13 March George was taken by horse-drawn vehicle to Lithgow via Mount Victoria, where he addressed an audience that evening. He travelled by train to Orange and then Bathurst, presenting lectures at both townships. During March and April George was often accompanied on his tour of New South Wales country areas by Cotton and the president of the New South Wales Single Tax League and the member for the Carcoar electorate in the Legislative Assembly, Charles L. Garland. During his Australian lecture tour Henry George also travelled to the colonies of Queensland, Victoria and South Australia. George's final Australian lecture was held on 31 May 1890 in the Protestant Hall in Sydney, on the topic of "The Fallacies of Protection".

=== Industrial turmoil ===
In about April 1890 Cotton was one of three delegates elected by the Wagga Wagga branch of the Amalgamated Shearers' Union to represent its members on the New South Wales Trades and Labor Council. Cotton represented the Wagga shearers at the Intercolonial Trades Hall Congress held at Ballarat in April 1891.

The maritime dispute that began in August 1890 eventually involved ten unions in New South Wales, including the Shearers' Union, and spread to unionists in three other colonies. The dispute began when shipowners refused to allow the Mercantile Marine Officers' Association to affiliate with the Melbourne Trades Hall Council, but it rapidly escalated into a series of strike actions involving wharf laborers, seamen, coal miners, and shearers across Australia and New Zealand. An estimated fifty thousand workers struck over the principles of the 'closed shop' versus employers' 'freedom of contract'. The executive committee of the Sydney Trades and Labor Council was engaged full-time in the strike until it was called off in early November. Cotton represented the Shearers' Union on the New South Wales Labor Defence Committee which controlled the strike in New South Wales. He edited the Labor Defence Journal, the official organ of the Labor Defence Committee, published during the industrial upheaval.

The first issue of The Democrat was published on 27 September 1890, edited by Frank Cotton ("the well-known single tax advocate") in conjunction with Alexander Riddell. Described as "a weekly satirical paper devoted to the advocacy of labor claims", intended as a weekly ally to The Australian Workman, a daily publication of the New South Wales Labour Defence Committee.

In the aftermath of the maritime strike on 25 November 1890 the New South Wales government appointed the Royal Commission on Strikes, "to inquire into the causes of and the best means calculated to prevent strikes". Cotton was one of sixteen members appointed to the commission. The report, published in May 1891, advocated the establishment of colonial conciliation and arbitration boards.

=== Labor Electoral Leagues ===
Following the failure of the 1890 maritime strike, the Sydney Trades and Labor Council had begun to consider the formation of a political organisation to represent workers and the mechanism by which this could be realised. In late November 1890 a resolution was passed at a special meeting of the Sydney Trades and Labor Council to establish a political organisation "with a view of securing better representation of Labor in Parliament and to effectively organise all that are favourable to the said object". In February 1891 a sub-committee of three, made up of Cotton, Thomas Houghton and Robert Boxall, was appointed to draft a constitution for a proposed political party and a platform for submission to the electors. Their work included formulating a framework for establishing district Labor Electoral Leagues to select candidates in each electorate. During March 1891 a series of meetings was held by the Trades and Labor Council (TLC) to consider and finally adopt the proposals submitted by Cotton, Houghton and Boxall on behalf of the TLC's parliamentary committee. One of the clauses (number 27) of the proposed platform was a Georgian-inspired proposal calling for the taxation of land values: "The recognition in our legislative enactments of the natural and unalienable rights of the whole community to the land – upon which all must live and from which, by labor, all wealth is produced – by the taxation of that value which accrues to land from the presence and needs of the community, irrespective of improvements effected by human exertion". During the period when Cotton, Houghton and Boxall were drafting the proposed platform and rules of the Labor Electoral League of New South Wales, Frank Cotton corresponded by letter with Sir Henry Parkes, the premier of the colony and leader of the Free Trade Party in the New South Wales Legislative Assembly. Cotton kept Parkes informed of the details and progress of the incipient political party representing the labour movement.

During the economic depression of the early 1890s trade policy (often referred to as the 'fiscal question') was a major political issue in the Australian colonies. Victoria took a protectionist stance, using tariffs as a means of promoting industrial growth, whereas politics in New South Wales was dominated by Free Trade and Protectionist factions. Henry George's economic philosophy not only advocated a single tax on the unimproved value of land, but he was also a strong promoter of free trade, arguing that protective tariffs raised prices without increasing wages. As a devotee of Georgian principles, Frank Cotton was also a strong supporter of free trade. However there were many within the labour movement who advocated protectionism as exemplified by the statement: "Protection is nothing else than national trades-unionism" (in a March 1891 letter to the editor of The Australian Star). On Tuesday evening, 24 March, the meeting of the Trades and Labor Council was occupied in discussing clause 27 of the proposed platform for Labor Electoral Leagues (the Georgian proposal calling for the taxation of land values). On this occasion "the debate was an animated one, and at times a trifle acrimonious". Alternative clauses were nominated, but eventually the original motion was carried. Discussion of the proposed platform and rules of the Labor Electoral League of New South Wales was finalised at a meeting of the Trades and Labor Council on the evening of 31 March 1891.

In April 1891 Cotton was a candidate in a by-election for the four-member East Sydney electorate after the death on 23 March of one of its sitting members, John R. Street. With the organising principles of Labor Electoral Leagues in the process of being formalised, Cotton campaigned as an independent labour candidate against two others representing the Protectionist and Free Trade parties. In early April 1891 a meeting was held in support of Cotton's candidature for the East Sydney electorate. During the gathering Cotton stated that "he was a firm believer in the single tax, and he did not believe this was in opposition to the principles of trades-unionism". At the election held on 14 April 1891 Cotton polled third with 29.5 percent of the vote. The Protectionist candidate, Walter Bradley, was elected to the seat.

On 13 May 1891 a letter to the editor was published in The Australian Star from Charles Hart of Balmain, who described himself as a labourer. Hart's letter accused the Single Tax League of infiltrating the Trades and Labor Council and of having an inordinate impact within that organisation. He singled out Frank Cotton's influence on the sub-committee in recommending neutrality to the TLC in regard to the "fiscal question" (free trade versus protectionism). Hart described the cohesiveness and single-mindedness of the advocates of the single tax: "The solidarity of labor is as nothing compared with the Single Tax, which is thrown down in the centre of the labor movement with if you don't like it you can leave it". With the Labor Electoral League in existence he warned: "The single-idea men are organised and ready, and the Protectionists will go down like skittles, because their friends do not understand the tricks and hold aloof". In the following issue of The Australian Star (a self-professed 'protectionist' newspaper), an editorial titled 'Single Tax Treachery' supported Hart's letter and accused the "Single Tax movement" of "endeavouring to disorganise the ranks of the working class", describing them as "thorough traitors in the camp". The editorial accused the "Single Taxers" (Cotton and Houghton) of conspiring to get themselves appointed to the TLC and their work on the Labor Electoral League sub-committee as being for "the express purpose of introducing their nostrum amidst a quantity of propositions which would, as they knew, be accepted by the working men and others".

On 8 June 1891, Cotton supported the formation of the Womanhood Suffrage League of New South Wales, saying that "equality was the soul of equity." In April 1892 he chaired a debate between Eliza Ashton and Rose Scott on Ashton's controversial views on marriage laws.

=== Political career ===
On 8 June 1891 Frank Cotton and John Hindle were selected as candidates representing the Labour Electoral League of New South Wales, to contest the electorate of Newtown in the New South Wales Legislative Assembly. The 1891 general election in New South Wales, held in June and early July 1891, saw the first electoral successes of the Labor Party (then known as the Labor Electoral League). The Newtown electorate had been changed to a four-member electorate and a total of eleven candidates were nominated to contest the seats. At the election held on 17 June 1889 the voters returned two Labour candidates and two Free Trade Party candidates, with the Labour Electoral League candidates out-polling the free-trade candidates. Cotton topped the poll with 2,572 votes (14.1 percent).

The 1891 New South Wales election saw the Labor Electoral League win thirty-five seats in the Legislative Assembly and the balance of power. With no party having a majority, the premier Sir Henry Parkes, leader of the Free Trade Party, held on until October 1891 when he lost a vote in the Legislative Assembly, leading to Parkes' resignation as premier and party leader. Sir George Dibbs, the leader of the Protectionist Party, then formed a ministry on 23 October 1891, with Labor support. On 28 November 1891 at a meeting in Newtown Frank Cotton announced that "he would not obey the decision of the party if they decided to support the Dibbs' Government in its financial proposals". In early December 1891 Cotton was the subject of a critical editorial in The Australian Workman which described him as a "traitor to his party and a political blackleg". In a later article in the same newspaper regarding the split in the Labor Party "over the fiscal question" Cotton was once again referred to as a "traitor". The writer expressed the view that "it is a lamentable fact that the fiscal malcontents have also formed an opposition party, thus intensifying the problem", adding: "On both sides it is pretty freely admitted that Frank Cotton's action has been the cause of all the recent trouble". The writer concluded; "That Cotton has split the Labor party is in the mouth of nearly every member of Parliament".

As the Labor party sought to develop the means of enforcing solidarity amongst its parliamentary members, Cotton's uncompromising free trade views were increasingly at odds with this trend within the party. In December 1892 the Newtown branch of the Labour Electoral League censured Cotton and Hindle, the two Labour members for the district, for having appeared on the platform at a meeting of the Free Trade Party held in November in the Protestant Hall in Castlereagh Street.

In November 1893 a conference was held in Sydney of assembled delegates from inner-city, suburban and country Labor Electoral Leagues. Cotton was amongst the Labor members of parliament who attended. The avowed purpose of the gathering was to revise the Labor platform and to resolve internal conflicts and enforce party discipline by formalising the requirement of Labor members of parliament to pledge themselves to vote in accordance with decisions made by the Labor caucus. In regard to the 'fiscal question', it was proposed that the Labor pledge should take precedence over whatever personal convictions a member may have in regard to free trade or protectionism. As one writer summarised the dilemma: "Undoubtedly the convention has a difficult task before it, because it has to evolve a platform which shall conciliate, if not combine, many conflicting opinions, including those of freetraders and protectionists, land taxers and single taxers trade unionists and socialists, all of whom will be directly represented". The conference chairman Chris Watson played a prominent role in reinforcing the requirement for Labor candidates to sign a pledge of solidarity committing them to vote as a unified caucus.

At the Labor party's third annual conference in March 1894 it was agreed to enforce the solidarity pledge requiring parliamentary members to vote strictly as a unified group based on majority caucus decisions. In April 1894 the majority of Labor members of the Legislative Assembly, including Cotton and the parliamentary leader Joseph Cook, refused to sign the 'caucus pledge', resulting in a split in the New South Wales Labor Electoral League. James McGowen, one of only three members who signed the pledge, succeeded Cook as parliamentary leader.

In September 1893 the Electoral Districts Commissioners presented their scheme of redistribution of seats under the new Electoral Act before the New South Wales Legislative Assembly. As part of the process, multi-member electorates were abolished and the electorates were realigned and in some cases renamed. The Newtown electorate was split into the single-member electorates of Newtown-Camperdown, Newtown-Erskine, Newtown-St Peters and Marrickville.

Photograph of Frank Cotton ('Porkobidni'), aged about 70, published in The World's News (Sydney), 19 November 1927.

At the 1894 general election Cotton was a candidate for the Newtown-St Peters electorate, one of the single-member constituencies split from the Newtown electorate. Cotton contested the election as an independent free trade candidate, opposed by three other candidates. At the election held on 14 July 1894 it was another independent free trade candidate, William Rigg, that topped the poll. Cotton polled second with 870 votes (25.4 percent).

The Free Trade Party under the leadership of George Reid dominated the New South Wales Legislative Assembly after the July 1894 election. However, after the party's legislative reform agenda was subjected to obstruction by the Legislative Council, Reid went to a general election a year later in an effort to strengthen his mandate for reform. At the general election held on 24 July 1895 Cotton contested the seat for the Newtown-Camperdown electorate, standing as a candidate for the Free Trade Party. In a field of four candidates Cotton was elected with 38.4 percent of the vote.

At the general election held on 27 July 1898, Cotton was re-elected to represent the Newtown-Camperdown electorate in a close contest against six other candidates. His opponents included James F. Smith, a Newtown alderman and mayor on four occasions. Cotton, for the Free Trade Party, attracted 471 votes (27.2 percent), just forty votes more than Smith. He remained in parliament until June 1901 and did not contest the election held in July.

=== Later years ===
After retiring from parliament Cotton continued his activities as a social reformer and contributed articles to newspapers and magazines supporting his beliefs and interests. Cotton had a strong interest in science and industry; during the 1920s and early 1930s, using the pen-name 'Porkobidni', he contributed many popular scientific articles to The World's News newspaper.

During the 1930s articles contributed by Cotton were regularly published in The Australian Worker.

Francis Cotton died on 28 November 1942, aged 85, at Lindfield, a suburb on the Upper North Shore of Sydney.

== Publications ==
- The Prophet of San Francisco and Other Sketches, Bathurst: G. Whalan, 1888.
- Conscious Evolution, Sydney: The Worker Trustees, 1900.
- The Case Against Imperial Federation (lecture delivered at Sydney University under the auspices of the Workers' Educational Association of Australia), Sydney: Worker Trade Union Print, 1917.
- 'The Curse of Cairo' (pamphlet), Sydney: The Worker Trustees, 1918.
- The Religion of Tom Paine (a lecture delivered by Frank Cotton under the auspices of the New South Wales Branch of the Australian Labor Party), Sydney: The Worker Trustees, 1918.
- Porkobidni's Plan, the Development of the Northern Territory (reprinted from The World's News), Sydney: F. Cotton, 1933.
- 'Story of Two Great Enterprises: A Capitalistic Tragedy and a Socialistic Triumph' (reprinted from Australian Worker, 30 January and 6 February 1935).
- 'Capitalism and the Church: A Glance at the Past and Present' (pamphlet), Sydney: The Worker Trustees, 1936.

New South Wales Legislative Assembly
| Preceded by Nicholas Hawken | Member for Newtown; 1891–1894; Served alongside: Joseph Abbott, John Hindle, Edmund Molesworth | Abolished |
| Preceded by Joseph Abbott | Member for Newtown-Camperdown; 1895–1901 | Succeeded by James Smith |
