= Nicholas Hawken =

Australian politician

Nicholas Hawken (1 January 1836 – 13 July 1908) was an English-born Australian politician.

Hawken was born at St Austell in Cornwall to William Hawken and Phillipa Harding. He was educated locally and migrated to New South Wales in 1854, working in the Shoalhaven area. In 1855 he settled in Sydney, going into business as a produce merchant. On 24 July 1861 he married Mary Jane Vance. They had thirteen children, the eleventh of whom was the engineer Roger Hawken (1878–1947).

A long-serving Darlington alderman, Hawken was mayor from 1881 to 1883. In 1887 he was elected to the New South Wales Legislative Assembly as the Free Trade member for Newtown. He served until his defeat in 1891. In 1899 Hawken was appointed to the New South Wales Legislative Council, where he served until his death and was reportedly a "ready and forcible debater". For example, in 1890 he had made a spirited defence in Parliament of the new and controversial sculptures on Sydney's General Post Office.

Hawken died at his home "The Gables" in City Road, Darlington in 1908, leaving "a number of literary productions", among which were some verse and some works on political subjects. His estate was valued for probate at £14,650. The surviving remains of one of his firm's buildings, the Hawken and Vance Produce Exchange, are listed on the New South Wales Heritage Register.

Civic offices
Preceded by William Elvy	Mayor of Darlington; 1881 – 1884	Succeeded by Thomas Warren
New South Wales Legislative Assembly
Preceded by James Smith	Member for Newtown; 1887 – 1891; Served alongside: Foster/Abbott, Gibbes/Mitchell/Molesworth	Succeeded by Francis Cotton; John Hindle
