= Jenny Leong =

Australian politician

Jenny Leong MP
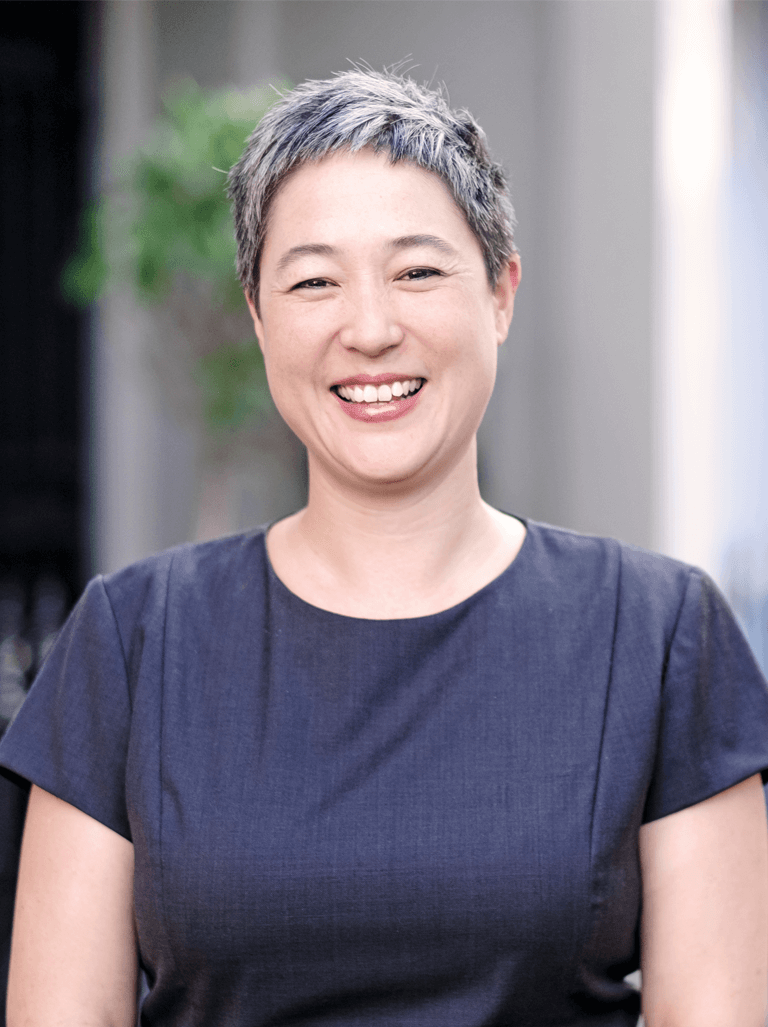

Member of the New South Wales Parliament for Newtown
- Incumbent
- Assumed office 28 March 2015
- Preceded by: New seat

Personal details
- Born: 1977 (age 48–49) Adelaide, South Australia
- Party: Greens
- Education: Flinders University, University of Sydney, University of Technology, Sydney
- Occupation: Politician
- Website: Official website

Jenny Leong (born 1977), an Australian politician, is a member of the New South Wales Legislative Assembly representing Newtown for the Greens since 2015. Leong is the first person to represent Newtown in its current form, as it was created for the 2015 election.

== Political career ==
Leong served as the Sydney University Postgraduate Representative Association President between February 2006 and July 2007. Leong was elected to the Sydney University Senate in 2007, serving for one year.

She was the Greens candidate for the division of Sydney in the 2004 and 2007 federal elections, but was unsuccessful. Leong also managed the NSW Greens' campaign for the 2013 federal election.

Leong won the newly created seat of Newtown against Labor's candidate, Penny Sharpe, during the 2015 New South Wales state election with a margin of more than ten points (two-candidate-preferred). She joined fellow Green Jamie Parker in the lower house of the New South Wales Parliament.

In October 2023, Leong signed an open letter condemning attacks against Israeli and Palestinian civilians during the Gaza war.

In early 2024, a video from a Palestine Justice Movement forum in Bankstown held in December 2023 surfaced in which Leong stated: "The Jewish lobby and the Zionist lobby are infiltrating into every single aspect of what is ethnic community groups ... they rock up to every community event because their tentacles reach into the areas that try and influence power". Leong was strongly criticised for use of the phrase, including by several Jewish community leaders and politicians such, as well as Australian Prime Minister Anthony Albanese. Leong's use of the term "tentacles" was compared to antisemitic tropes. Leong apologised for her remarks, saying she "apologise[d] wholeheartedly and unreservedly". Jewish people subsequently protested in front of Leong's office, with some protesters dressed as inflatable squids.

== Personal life ==
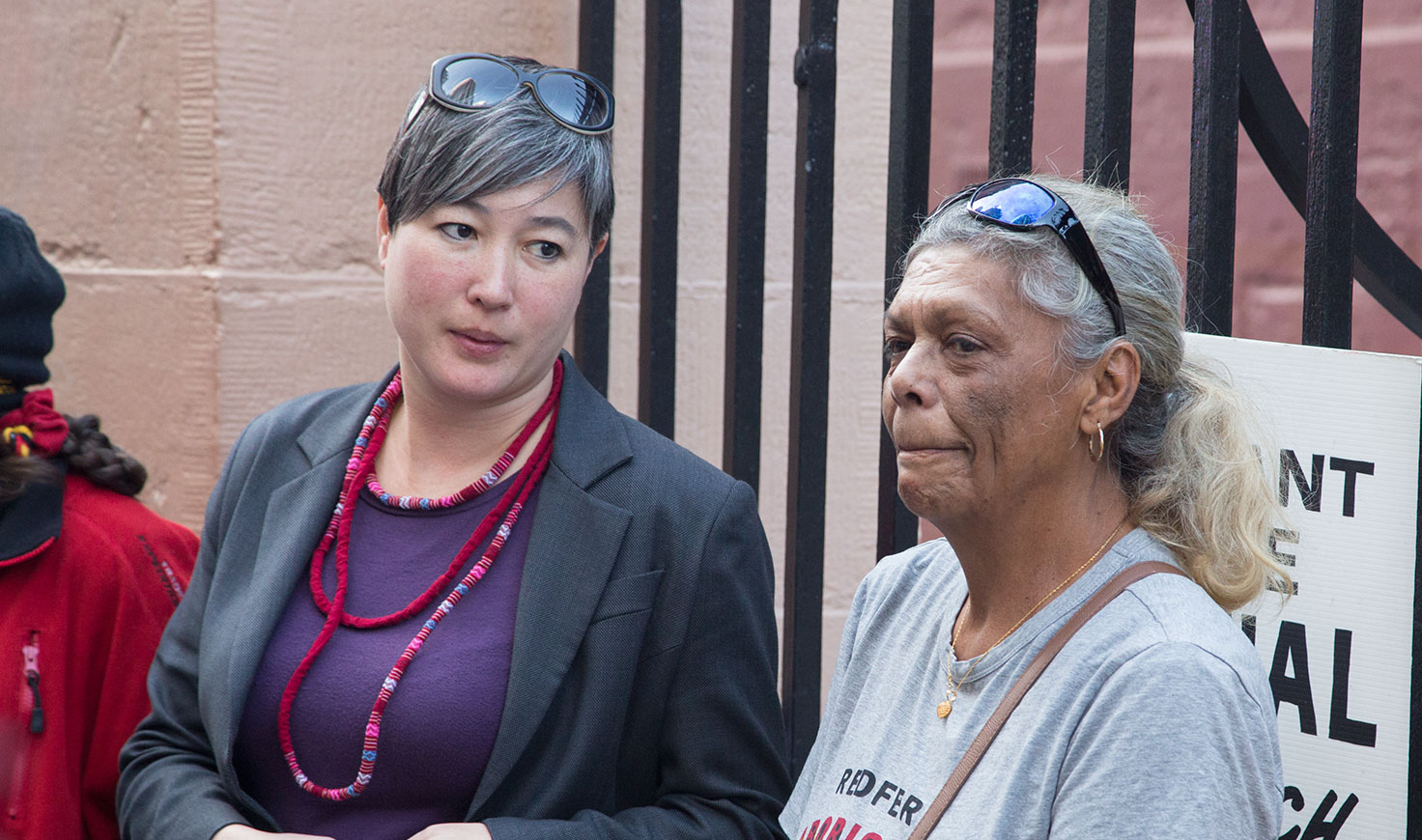
Leong (left) with Aboriginal elder Jenny Munro

Leong was born in 1977 in Adelaide to a Chinese Malaysian father and an Anglo-Australian mother. In 1996, at the age of nineteen, Leong permanently relocated to Newtown.

Leong worked with Amnesty International from 2008 to 2012 as a crisis coordinator and a campaign organiser before entering politics. Although based in London, Hong Kong, and Australia, Leong worked all over the world. At Amnesty she oversaw the organisation's response to the Arab Spring as well as protecting freedom of expression in Burmese elections. She also spent more than three years on the Human Rights Law Resource Centre advisory committee.

New South Wales Legislative Assembly
New seat	Member for Newtown; 2015–present	Incumbent
