= The World's News =

Former newspaper in Sydney, Australia

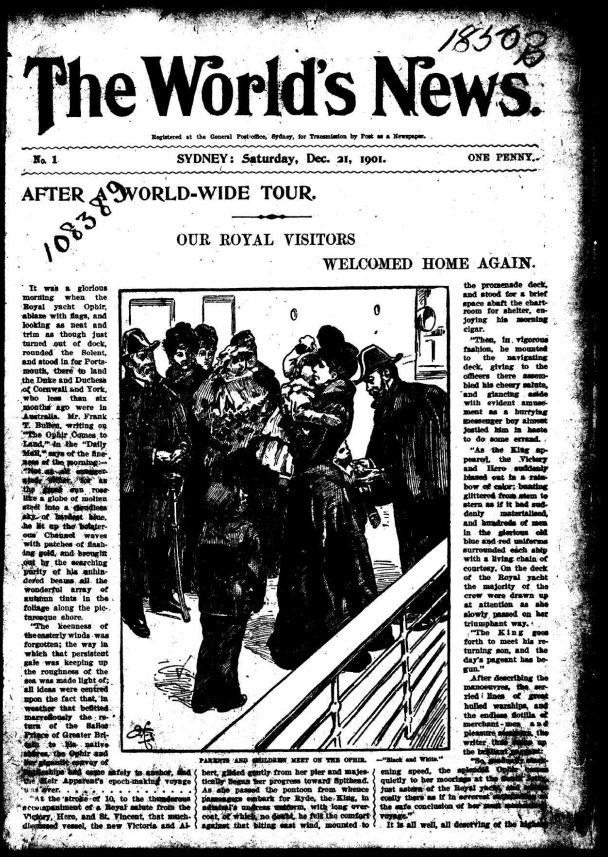
Front cover of The World's News on 21 December 1901

The World's News was a newspaper published in Sydney, Australia, from 1901 to 1955.

== History ==
The World's News was first published on 21 December 1901 by Watkin Wynne.

== Digitisation ==
This paper has been digitised as part of the Australian Newspapers Digitisation Program project of the National Library of Australia.

== See also ==
- List of newspapers in Australia
- List of newspapers in New South Wales
