= Frank Burke (Australian politician) =

Australian politician (1876–1949)

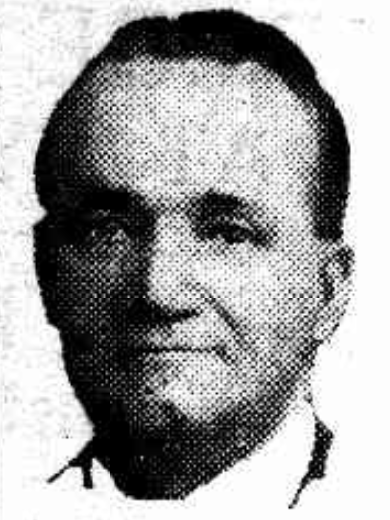
Burke, c. 1930s

Francis Michael Burke (27 March 1876 – 17 August 1949) was an Australian politician.

== Biography ==
Born at Tamworth to police officer Michael Burke (who would serve in the Parliament of New South Wales from 1885 to 1887) and Catherine Agnes, née Leahy, he attended Crown Street Public School. After leaving school he held a variety of jobs including storeman, hotel manager and assistant on the staff of the Evening News. In 1901, he married Ada May Frazer, with whom he had five children. He worked on the tramways until he was dismissed after involvement in a union-led 1908 strike; he formed a small business and from 1914 to 1918 worked as an inspector for the New South Wales Commodities Commission and the Commonwealth Price Commission. He also worked as a staff member for Clive Evatt, and was president of the Newtown branch of the Labor Party.

As president of the Anti-Conscription Council, Burke was ardently opposed to conscription and in 1917 was elected to the New South Wales Legislative Assembly as the member for Newtown. While proportional representation was in force from 1920 to 1927 he was one of the members for Botany, returning to his old seat in 1927. From 1930 to 1932, he was Speaker of the Assembly. In July 1939, he joined Bob Heffron's Industrial Labor Party, but this splinter group was reincorporated into the ALP in August. He was defeated in 1944 by Lang Labor candidate Lilian Fowler. Burke died at Dulwich Hill in 1949.

New South Wales Legislative Assembly
Preceded by Robert Hollis	Member for Newtown; 1917–1920	District abolished
Preceded by Thomas Mutch	Member for Botany; 1920–1927; Served alongside: Hickey/Ratcliffe, John Lee, McKell, Mutch	Succeeded by Thomas Mutch
New district	Member for Newtown; 1927–1944	Succeeded by Lilian Fowler
Preceded by Sir Daniel Levy	Speaker of the New South Wales Legislative Assembly; 1930–1932	Succeeded by Sir Daniel Levy
