= John Hindle =

Australian politician (1857–1927)

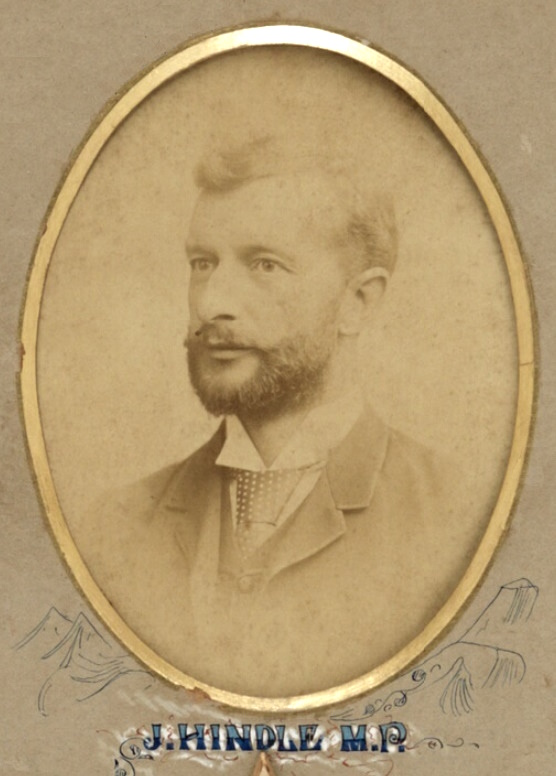

Member for Newtown (NSW Legislative Assembly)
- In office 17 June 1891 – 25 June 1894

Personal details
- Born: 6 April 1857 Rishton, Lancashire, England
- Died: 29 December 1927 (aged 70) Stanmore, New South Wales
- Spouse: Robina Bardsley
- Parents: William Hindle (father); Elizabeth (née Woolstonecraft) (mother)

John Hindle (6 April 1857 – 29 December 1927) was an English-born Australian politician, businessman and lay preacher.

Hindle grew up in north-west England, in working-class conditions and with a rudimentary education. In 1871, aged 14, he emigrated to Australia with his father. In Melbourne Hindle established a drapery business, became a preacher in Nonconformist churches and was active in the movement for early closing legislation. He married into the Bardsley family, established in a wholesale grocery business in Sydney, in which business he eventually became a manager and partner. From June 1891 to June 1894 Hindle served as one of four members for the Newtown electorate in the New South Wales Legislative Assembly. His short parliamentary career was eventful. Elected as a Labour Electoral League candidate (in the initial group of Labor Party members), he became an independent free trade supporter after refusing to sign the labour pledge. Hindle's opposition to a parliamentary drinking culture and sermonising on the subject led to further controversy.

== Biography ==
=== Early years ===
John Hindle was born on 6 April 1857 in the village of Rishton, near Blackburn in Lancashire, the only son of William Hindle and Elizabeth (née Woolstonecraft). He had four sisters. His early education was of a rudimentary nature.

John's mother died in 1867, when he was aged 10, after which the family "was broken up". In 1868, aged 11, John "started out to earn his own living" working in a Lancashire cotton mill alongside hundreds of other children. On a typical day he had a five o'clock start, to walk two miles from his home to the factory, and reached home in the evening at 7 o'clock.

In 1869, aged 12, John "had the good fortune to be taken out of the factory and placed with a kind relative at Wolverhampton", where he received some further schooling. A year later he moved to Wigan, midway between Manchester and Liverpool, where he worked as an errand boy.

=== Melbourne ===
In 1871 John Hindle, then aged 14, emigrated to Australia with his father aboard the steamer SS Great Britain, which departed from Liverpool on 24 May and arrived at Melbourne on 27 July 1871.

In Melbourne Hindle found work as an errand boy in the drapery warehouse of S.C. King in North Melbourne. He remained with the firm for seven years, by which time he had been promoted to the position of manager of one of the departments. In 1878 Hindle established his own business in premises at Carlton, and later in Swanston Street in Melbourne. In February 1882 Hindle was described as a "master draper".

From the late 1870s Hindle preached in Primitive Methodist and Congregational churches.

Hindle identified himself with the early closing movement. During 1881 the Salesmen and Assistants' Union and the Early Closing Association began to agitate for early closing legislation for shops in Victoria, gathering petitions and holding public meetings. In January 1882 the Victorian government appointed a commission to enquire into and report upon the best means of regulating and shortening the hours of labour in shops and factories. Hindle was elected president of the Salesmen and Assistants' Union in 1882. He was examined before the Early Closing Commission in February 1882, expressing the opinion that "long hours were injurious". In his business early closing "did not affect the takings, but his assistants were more zealous, besides being healthier".^{[A]}

In 1882 John Hindle and Robina Munro Bardsley were married at Petersham, a suburb in Sydney's inner west. The couple had three daughters born from 1886 to 1896.^{[B]}

=== Sydney ===
Within a year or two of their marriage John and Robina Hindle moved to Sydney. Hindle began working as a town traveller, probably for John Bardsley and Co., the wholesale grocery business established by Robina's father and being managed by her younger brothers. Hindle eventually became a manager and partner in the business (though as late as 1891 his occupation was described as "shop assistant").

During 1889 Hindle began preaching at the Christians' Chapel in Petersham Street in Petersham.

=== Political career ===
At the third annual conference of the Single Tax League in late March and early April 1891 Hindle was one of the representatives of the Sydney branch and at the conference was elected as a member of the executive council.

On 8 June 1891 John Hindle and Frank Cotton were selected as candidates, representing the Labour Electoral League of New South Wales, to contest the electorate of Newtown in the New South Wales Legislative Assembly. The 1891 general election in New South Wales, held in June and early July 1891, saw the first electoral successes of the Labor Party (then known as the Labour Electoral League). The Newtown electorate had been changed to a four-member electorate and a total of eleven candidates were nominated to contest the seats. At the election held on 17 June 1889 the voters returned two Labour candidates and two Free Trade Party candidates, with the Labour Electoral League candidates out-polling the free-trade candidates. Hindle polled second with 2,411 votes (13.2 percent).

In December 1892 the Newtown branch of the Labour Electoral League censured Cotton and Hindle, the two Labour members for the district, for having appeared on the platform at a meeting of the Free Trade Party held in November in the Protestant Hall in Castlereagh Street.

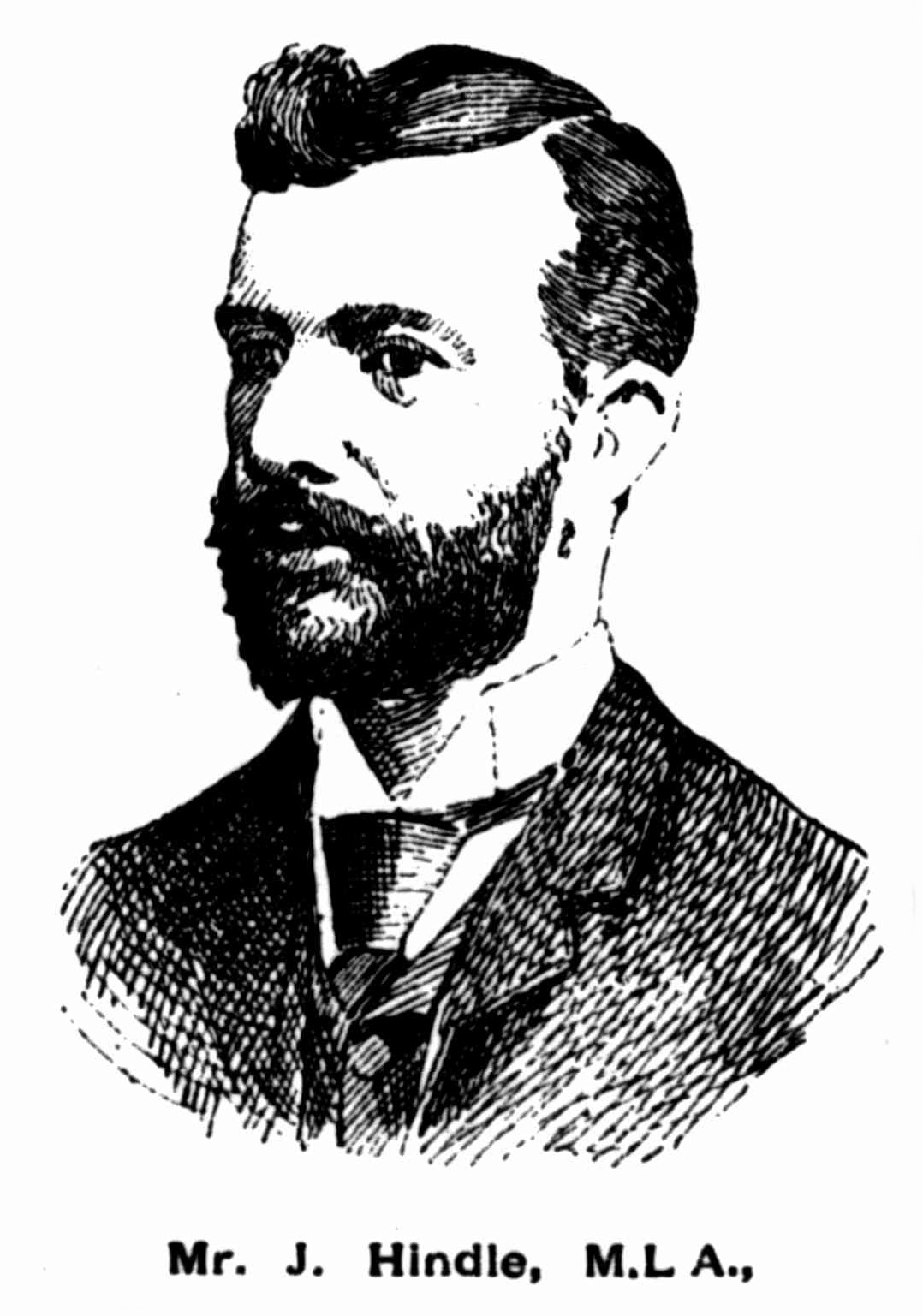
Illustration of John Hindle, published in Australian Town and Country Journal, 27 January 1894.

On 17 January 1894, the opening night of the session in the Legislative Assembly chamber, Hindle called attention to the drunken state of the Minister for Lands, Henry Copeland. The opposition politician Sir Henry Parkes had finished speaking on a censure motion by George Reid when Copeland rose and proceeded to criticise Parkes' speech. After about fifteen minutes Hindle rose and drew attention to the minister's intoxicated state, saying: "It is quite evident to me that the Minister is in such a condition that he is unfit to address this House... in the evident condition of intoxication in which he is". After a few angry words Copeland crossed over to the opposition benches, but was prevented from reaching Hindle. After further angry words from Copeland the Speaker ordered the minister's removal, ruling him out of order for threatening to attack another member. Copeland then "allowed himself to be quietly led out of the House by the sergeant-of-arms". Soon afterwards the debate was adjourned and the House rose for the night. Copeland remained outside the building, declaring his intention of remaining there until Hindle "put in an appearance". After the House was adjourned, however, Hindle left the building by a rear exit. When the House met the following afternoon Copeland made "a frank and unconditional apology for what had occurred", claiming he had been "provoked beyond measure, and in a moment of excitement he lost control over himself". He admitted that his conduct was unbecoming of a member of parliament and a minister, and tendered his resignation as Minister for Lands, which was accepted.

In February 1894 Hindle delivered a sermon at the Lithgow Primitive Methodist church on the subject of drunkenness and immorality, during which he attacked the character of the New South Wales parliament, claiming that it "contained notorious drunkards" and he himself had been "an eye-witness to so much drunkenness". He advised the electors in the congregation not to vote for such men "even if politically of the same opinion, but to study above all things character and honesty". When the parliament met on 20 February 1894, a motion was carried asking Hindle "to explain his utterances" at Lithgow. Hindle's reply "was brief, and merely amounted to a reiteration of his sermon". The premier Sir George Dibbs then gave notice of a motion that Hindle's statement "was a gross libel upon the Assembly". During the debate the next day, Gibbs "denounced the Lithgow sermon as an exhibition of self-righteousness" and other speakers "characterised the Hindle accusations as uncharitable, un-English, slanderous, fanatical, unjustifiable, cruel and malignant". After a lengthy debate, the motion was carried. A further motion to bring Hindle before the House to be reprimanded was discussed but eventually dropped.

In April 1894 Hindle and Cotton, two of the members for Newtown, addressed a disorderly meeting in the Newtown Town Hall, at which both men attempted to justify their actions and votes in parliament and their refusals to sign the new labour pledge. Hindle described the pledge as one that "took away the liberty and freedom of a man, and made him a slave". A motion was proposed that Cotton and Hindle had "forfeited the confidences of their constituents, inasmuch as they have on several occasions violated the pledge and platform which they are selected upon, and in consequence thereof this meeting now demands from them the immediate resignation of their seat in Parliament". However, amid the uproar and clamour of the meeting, "very few voted for the motion". At a public meeting in June 1894 Hindle addressed the issue of the "labour pledge", stating that "as an honourable man he could not subscribe to a pledge to vote at all times with a majority whether right or wrong". He added that "he would prefer defeat to dictation by a political caucus".

Prior to the 1894 general election multi-member electoral districts were abolished, with the Newtown electorate being replaced by four separate electorates. Hindle was one of four candidates who nominated for the Newtown-Erskine electorate, running as an independent free trade candidate. At the election held on 17 July 1894 Hindle received only 106 votes (6.8 percent). His previous colleague in the seat of Newtown, Edmund Molesworth, was elected with 48.1 percent of the vote as a Free Trade Party candidate.

=== Business interests ===
In 1903 the registered partners of John Bardsley and Co., wholesale grocery business in Castlereagh Street, Sydney, were Hindle's brothers-in-law John Edward Bardsley and Dr. Ernest Alexander Bardsley, as well as Hindle himself and James Hunter and Philip Henry Jeffrey. Within the next few years the registered partners were just the two Bardsley brothers and John Hindle.

Hindle was a member of the Merchants and Importers' Association. In October 1906 he was elected chairman of the Association "for the current year".

In January 1907 Hindle resigned from active management of John Bardsley and Co. and left the firm's partnership. He had been connected with the business for thirty-two years.

In March 1907 Hindle was entertained at dinner by the Merchants and Importers' Association on the eve of his departure for Europe and England. The objective of his trip was to induce one hundred families to immigrate to Australia and intended to lecture "and do the necessary propaganda work at his own expense".

=== Later years ===
Hindle purchased the business of Samuel Taylor Ltd., wholesale distributors, and held the controlling interest until his death in 1827.

Hindle was a generous donor to charity. He was on the committee controlling the City Night Refuge and Soup Kitchen in Kent Street, Sydney.

John Hindle died on 29 December 1927 at his home in Cavendish Street, Stanmore. He was buried in the Independent section of the Rookwood cemetery.

== Notes ==
A. The findings of the Early Closing Commission resulted in the 'Factories and Shops Act 1885', which came into operation in March 1886. The Act mandated specific closing times for shops in metropolitan areas.

B. Robina Munro Bardsley was the only daughter of John Bardsley and Janet (formerly Buchanan, née Munro), born in 1860 at Glebe. She had two younger surviving brothers, John Edward Bardsley and Ernest Alexander Bardsley. By 1854 her father had established a grocery business in Glebe, which by the late 1850s was located at 55 Glebe Street. By 1868 the business included a wholesale grocery store in Sussex Street in Sydney. In 1871 John Bardsley moved his retail business to larger premises in Glebe Street, a shop known as 'Glebe Stores' (which included a drapery). In 1879 the wholesale business of John Bardsley & Co. in Sydney moved to George Street and in September 1880 the Glebe retail grocery, drapery and ironmongery business was sold in order to focus on the growing city-based wholesale and importing enterprise. By this stage the firm of John Bardsley & Co. was a partnership between John Bardsley, James Hunter and James Evans. The business expanded into the importation of tea and tobacco.

New South Wales Legislative Assembly
Preceded by Nicholas Hawken	Member for Newtown; 1891–1894; Served alongside: Joseph Abbott, Francis Cotton, Edmund Molesworth	Abolished
