= Thomas Holt (Australian politician) =

Australian politician (1811–1888)

The Honourable Thomas Holt
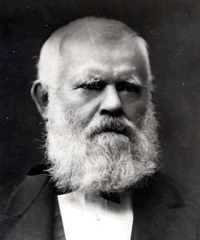

3rd Colonial Treasurer of New South Wales
- In office 6 June 1856 – 25 August 1856
- Preceded by: Campbell Riddell
- Succeeded by: Robert Campbell
- Constituency: Stanley Boroughs

Member of the New South Wales Legislative Assembly for Stanley Boroughs
- In office 7 April 1856 – 6 June 1856
- In office 23 June 1856 – 19 December 1857
- Preceded by: New seat
- Succeeded by: Benjamin Cribb

Member of the New South Wales Legislative Assembly for Newtown
- In office 12 July 1861 – 10 November 1864
- Preceded by: Alexander McArthur
- Succeeded by: Stephen Brown

Member of Legislative Council of New South Wales
- In office 13 October 1868 – 6 December 1883

Personal details
- Born: Thomas Holt; 14 November 1811 Horbury, Yorkshire, England
- Died: 5 September 1888 (aged 76) Bexley, Kent, England
- Resting place: Abney Park Cemetery
- Spouse: Sophie Eulert (m.1841)
- Occupation: Pastoralist, politician

Thomas Holt (14 November 1811 – 5 September 1888) was an English-born Australian pastoralist, company director and politician. He was a member of the New South Wales Legislative Council between 1868 and 1883. He was also a member of the New South Wales Legislative Assembly for two periods between 1856 and 1857 and again between 1861 and 1864. Holt was the first Colonial Treasurer in New South Wales.

== Early life ==
Holt, born in Horbury, Yorkshire, England in November 1811, was the son of Thomas Holt Snr. a Yorkshire wool merchant and Elizabeth Ellis and was educated in Wakefield. He initially worked in his father's firm in Leeds but after 3 years became a wool buyer in London. Subsequently, Holt emigrated to Sydney in 1842 and made a fortune as a wool merchant. He was also a director of numerous colonial companies including the Sydney Railway Company. Holt invested extensively in pastoral land and by 1860 had acquired more than 3 million acres (12,000 km^{2}) in New South Wales and Queensland. As a result, he was independently wealthy and retired from active business in 1855.

After building a gothic stone mansion, "The Warren", on land overlooking the Cooks River in Marrickville, Holt stocked the grounds with imported European rabbits for breeding and hunting, alpacas, llamas and salmon. Holt also had an extensive estate in the Sans Souci area of Sydney. In later life he was a founder of Royal Prince Alfred Hospital, a member of the Royal Society of New South Wales and a patron of the Royal Agricultural Society of New South Wales.

== Colonial Parliament ==
Holt was unsuccessful at two attempts to enter the Legislative Council prior to the establishment of responsible self-government in 1856. However, at the first election under the new constitution he was elected to the Legislative Assembly as one of the two members for Stanley Boroughs (including Brisbane and Ipswich) which, prior to the establishment of Queensland as a separate colony in 1859, was part of New South Wales. At the next election in 1858, Holt was defeated in an attempt to transfer to the seat of Cumberland (South Riding). He re-entered the Assembly as the member for Newtown at an 1861 by-election caused by the resignation of Alexander McArthur but resigned from the seat before the next election in 1864–65. In 1868 he accepted a life appointment to the Legislative Council.

Holt was a supporter of free-trade and had a liberal political philosophy. Throughout his political career he campaigned for education, gaol and immigration reform and spent a small fortune supporting Henry Parkes' "Empire" newspaper. An active Congregationalist, in 1864 he gave half the value of his residence, Camden Villa, towards the founding of Camden College (Congregational Church school).

== Government ==
Holt was the third Colonial Treasurer and the first following the introduction of responsible government in New South Wales in 1856, serving in the liberal government of Stuart Donaldson. He held this position for 80 days.

== Oyster farming venture ==
Holt attempted to create an oyster farming industry at Gwawley Bay and Weeney Bay on the Georges River in the 1870s, based on the French technique of raising oysters in claires. The venture encountered difficulties, with high rates of loss of oysters, and proved to be uneconomic, despite producing some large and fine oysters. However, Holt was one of the first to attempt to replace unsustainable dredge harvesting of oysters with a sustainable method of aquaculture. He was a pioneer of oyster farming in the Georges River estuary.

== Later life ==
In 1881 Holt went back to England where he devoted himself to the poor of London, working with The Salvation Army, Andrew Mearns and Dr Barnardo. He died at his home "Halcot" in Bexley, Kent, on 5 September, after completing his book, 'Christianity, or the Poor Man's Friend'; and was buried at Abney Park Cemetery.

== Legacy ==
The Thomas Holt Retirement Villages in the south of Sydney are named after him. The promontory known as Holts Point, now part of Sylvania Waters, is named after him; Holt's former house, Sutherland House, stood there, until it was destroyed by fire in 1918. Sandstone blocks from the ruin were reused in the Sutherland War Memorial, unveiled in 1921.

New South Wales Legislative Assembly
Preceded by First election	Member for Stanley Boroughs; 1856 – 1857; Served alongside: Richardson	Succeeded by Benjamin Cribb
Preceded by Alexander McArthur	Member for Newtown; 1861 – 1864	Succeeded by Stephen Campbell
Political offices
Preceded by Campbell Riddell	Colonial Treasurer; 1856	Succeeded by Robert Campbell
