= Joseph Abbott (New South Wales politician) =

Australian politician

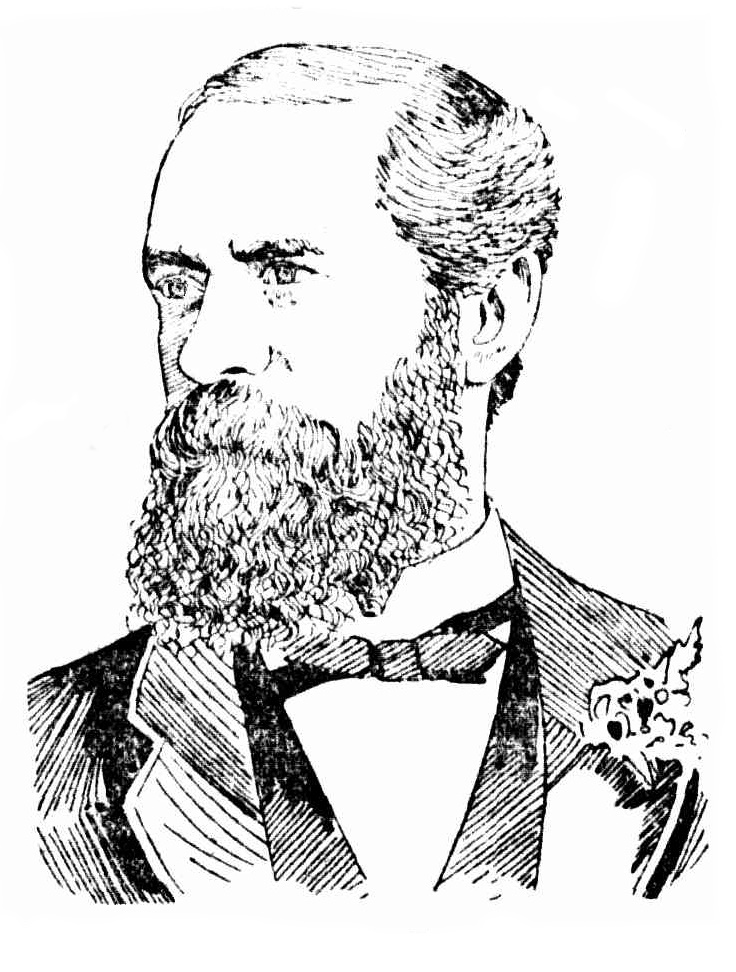

Member for Newtown (NSW Legislative Assembly)
- In office 2 February 1888 – 19 January 1889

Member for Newtown (NSW Legislative Assembly)
- In office 17 June 1891 – 25 June 1894

Member for Newtown-Camperdown (NSW Legislative Assembly)
- In office 17 July 1894 – 5 July 1895

Personal details
- Born: August 1843 Parramatta, New South Wales
- Died: 15 June 1903 (aged 59) Croydon, New South Wales
- Spouse: Margaret Anne Bennett
- Parents: Henry Kingsmill Abbott (father); Martha Anne (née Lavarey or Lefroy) (mother)

Joseph Abbott (August 1843 – 15 June 1903) was a wool-broker and politician in New South Wales.

Abbott joined the wool-broking firm of Mort and Company in 1863 and remained closely associated with the business throughout his life. He rose from a clerical position to be made a partner and later a director of the company. Abbott initiated annual auction sales of stud sheep in Sydney, at which he was the chief auctioneer from 1875 to 1888. As a prominent advocate of free trade he represented the Newtown and Newtown-Camperdown electorates in the New South Wales Legislative Assembly from February 1888 to July 1895.

== Biography ==
=== Early years ===
Joseph Abbott was born in August 1843 at Parramatta, New South Wales, the youngest son of Henry Kingsmill Abbott and Martha Anne (née Lavarey or Lefroy). Joseph was born to a widowed mother, his father had been murdered in December 1842 at Parramatta Gaol where he was the chief turnkey (prison guard).^{[A]}

Young Joseph was educated at the Church of England Denominational School at Parramatta, but despite his abilities and a particular aptitude for figures, his widowed mother could not afford to keep him at school. After leaving school in about 1858, intending to become a newspaper reporter, he took shorthand lessons in Sydney and in order to develop public speaking skills he joined young men's improvement and debating societies.

In 1863 Abbott travelled to Queensland on a mining venture, but soon afterwards returned to Sydney.

=== Mort and Company ===
In 1863 Abbott was introduced to Thomas Mort by friends in the debating society and he was offered a position as a clerk in the produce department of Mort and Company. His employment by Mort and Co. was the beginning of a period of nearly forty years of Abbott's active connection with the Sydney wool trade.

Joseph Abbott and Margaret Anne Bennett were married on 29 November 1866 at the bride's father's residence in Samuel Street, Surry Hills. The couple initially lived in the inner west suburb of Glebe, but soon afterwards moved to Newtown. They had three daughters and six sons; their eldest child, George, was born in August 1867.

In January 1875 Abbott was listed as a candidate to become an alderman of Newtown Council, to represent the O'Connell Ward of the borough. His occupation was recorded as "writing clerk", living in Newtown Road. Of the two nominated candidates for O'Connell Ward, Abbott was elected as an alderman in February 1875.

In 1875 Mort and Co. inaugurated stud sheep sales in Sydney, an initiative by Joseph Abbott. As a wool salesman for Mort and Co. he had travelled extensively throughout the colony and his understanding of the requirements of wool growers originated the idea of securing stud sheep for auction, mostly of the merino breed and initially from Tasmania. Previously such sales had only been carried out in Melbourne. The first sale of pure bred merino rams from two Tasmanian studs was held in October 1875 on the stock quarantine grounds at Randwick and Abbott personally conducted the sale as auctioneer. The first stud sheep sale was a modest affair, but it filled a need and expanded in subsequent years, becoming an annual event. For the remainder of the 1870s the sales were held at the new quarantine grounds at Petersham, with the exception of the 1879 sale held in October at the Sydney International Exhibition. In 1880 and subsequent years the annual sale of stud sheep was held in Mort and Co.'s wool warehouse at Circular Quay. During the 1880s the annual auction sales became known as the Stud Sheep Fair.

In January 1878 Abbott was admitted as a partner in the firm of Mort and Co. He had risen from a junior clerk in the extensive organisation of Mort and Co. to become a partner in the business and manager of the wool and produce department. Abbott was considered to be a "self-made man", his position in life being attributed to "his own perseverance, industry, and integrity".

Abbott resigned as an alderman of the municipality of Newtown (O'Connell Ward) in May 1879. In about 1880 the family moved to the inner west suburb of Croydon.

In about July 1883 Mort and Company became a limited liability company under the title Mort and Company, Ltd., without a change to the management structure of the company. Under the new company structure Abbott was appointed as a director.

In 1888 the two companies of Mort and Company, Ltd. of Sydney and R. Goldsborough and Company, Ltd., based in Melbourne, amalgamated under the title of Goldsborough, Mort and Company, Ltd. After the amalgamation Abbott remained a director and took a position on the advisory board. He handed over the selling at the Stud Sheep Fair to George Maiden, who had been the Sydney manager of the Goldsborough company.

=== Political career ===
After the death of Frederick Gibbes, one of the members representing the three-member Newtown electorate in the New South Wales Legislative Assembly, a by-election was held to fill the vacancy. Abbott was a known supporter of free trade and was induced to stand for the seat by the veteran politician Sir Henry Parkes. A meeting of electors was held on 31 January 1888 to nominate candidates to represent the electorate in the place of the late member. The two nominations represented the prevailing political divisions of free trade and protectionism, with James Francis Smith as the protectionist candidate and Joseph Abbott a free trade supporter. The most vocal of the assembled electors favoured Smith, with Abbott's address being continuously interrupted and his nomination being met with "loud demonstrations of opposition". At the election held on 3 February, Abbott was elected with 1,890 votes (51.1 percent).

At the 1889 general election held in February 1889, for the three-member Newtown electorate six candidates were nominated, three each of advocates of free-trade and protectionism. The result was a complete victory for the free-trade candidates; all three were elected with Abbott topping the poll with 21 percent of the vote. In parliament Abbott "was a staunch freetrader, and was always prominently identified with the movement", particularly in the period up to October 1891 under Sir Henry Parkes' leadership of the Free Trade Party.

In April 1889 Abbott was elected a director of the Waratah Coal Company. In June 1889 he was elected to the board of directors of the Australian Mutual Provident Society. He also held directorship positions in the Royal Exchange and the Commercial Union Insurance Company.

The 1891 general election held in June and early July 1891 saw the first appearance of the Labor Party (then known as the Labour Electoral League of New South Wales). The Newtown electorate had been changed to a four-member electorate and a total of eleven candidates were nominated to contest the seats. At the election held on 17 June 1889 the voters returned two Labor Party candidates and two Free Trade Party candidates, with the Labor Party candidates out-polling the free-trade candidates. Abbott polled third with 2,173 votes (11.9 percent). During his parliamentary career Abbott "displayed a wide knowledge of the problems connected with land legislation, and had a clear grip of State finances, enunciating his views when necessary with logical clearness". He "advocated the spread of technical education to develop artisan skills and supported reorganization of the civil service on the basis of merit".

Prior to the 1894 general election multi-member electoral districts were abolished, with the Newtown electorate being replaced by four separate electorates. Abbott, representing the Free Trade Party, was one of four candidates who nominated for the Newtown-Camperdown electorate. He was opposed by Labor and Protectionist candidates, as well as a Free Trade and Land Reform Association candidate. Abbott topped the poll, held in July 1894, with 852 votes (46.7 percent).

Abbott retired from politics because of ill-health after the New South Wales parliament was dissolved on the advice of the premier, George Reid in early July 1895.

=== Later years ===
Abbott suffered from ill health in the last six years of his life "and he was more than once considered to be at death's door".

Abbott resigned as a director of the Australian Mutual Provident Society in about 1901 "on account of his continued ill-health".

Joseph Abbott died on 15 June 1903 at his 'Ivanhoe' residence in Croydon Road, Croydon, New South Wales. He had suffered from a protracted illness since about 1897 and had been unconscious for the twenty-four hours prior to his death.

== Family ==
On his death Joseph Abbott was survived by his widow, six sons and three daughters. All his sons were educated at Newington College. George Henry Abbott (1867–1942), became a medical practitioner, lectured in clinical surgery at the Royal Prince Alfred Hospital in 1911–27, was a founding fellow of the Royal Australian College of Surgeons, and a councillor and later president of the New South Wales branch of the British Medical Association. He was also a keen numismatist, sometime president of the Royal Australian Historical Society and fellow of the University of Sydney Senate. Joseph Sydney Abbott (1869–1957), followed in his father's steps, and was for many years a partner in the firm of Wright & Abbott, wool scourers, brokers and commission agents. Arthur Edgar Abbott (1876–1960), studied law and was admitted to the Bar in 1900. He initially became a partner in Lambton, Milford & Abbott but in 1909 he retired from that firm and became a partner in Garland, Seaborne and Abbott. From 1947 until 1949 he was president of The Incorporated Law Institute of New South Wales.

== Notes ==
A. Henry Kingsmill Abbott was the first prison officer killed on duty in New South Wales. He was born in 1806 at Borris-in-Ossory in Queen's County, Ireland, the son of Thomas Abbott and Eleanor (née Kingsmill). Abbott and Martha Ann (née Lavarey or Lefroy) were married in about 1825 in Ireland. The family emigrated to Australia, arriving at Sydney on 10 January 1842 aboard the Duke of Roxburgh, after which Abbott found work as a turnkey at Parramatta Gaol. On the evening of 4 December 1842 William Lynch and two other prisoners surprised Abbott as he was guarding the outer gate. Lynch shot the officer in the abdomen and the three escaped from the gaol. Abbott died on 7 December from his wound. His widow Martha later remarried. Martha Kay, died on 16 July 1888 at the home of her son, John Abbott, in Surry Hills, aged 79.

New South Wales Legislative Assembly
Preceded by Frederick Gibbes	Member for Newtown; 1888–1894; With: Nicholas Hawken / Francis Cotton; Joseph Mitchell / Edmund Molesworth none / John Hindle	District abolished replaced by Newtown-Camperdown, Newtown-Erskine, Newtown-St Peters and Marrickville
New district replaced part of Newtown	Member for Newtown-Camperdown; 1894–1895	Succeeded by Francis Cotton
