= Lilian Fowler =

Australian politician (1886–1954)

Lilian Fowler MBE, JP
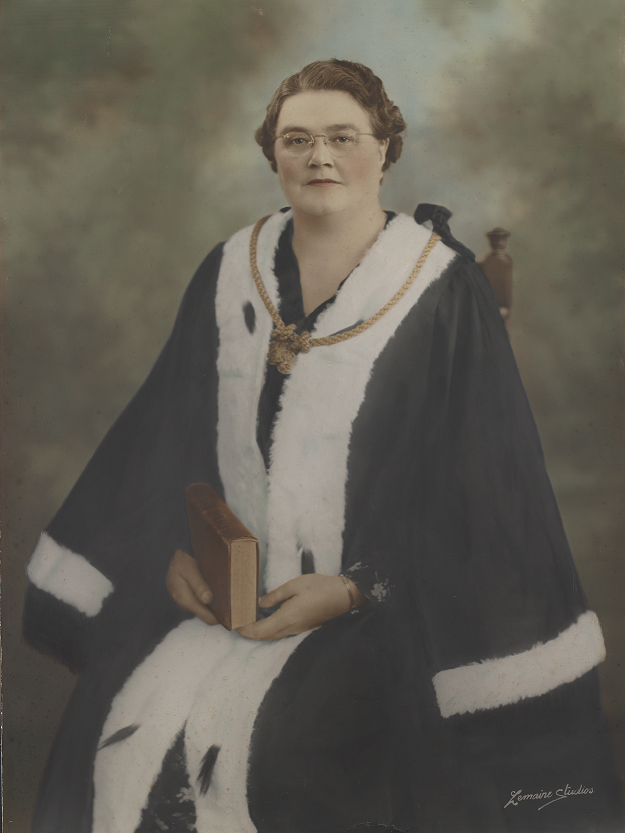

Member of the New South Wales Parliament for Newtown
- In office 27 May 1944 – 22 May 1950
- Preceded by: Frank Burke
- Succeeded by: District abolished

40th Mayor of Newtown
- In office 7 December 1937 – 12 December 1939
- Deputy: Joseph Solomon
- Preceded by: Isidore Ryan
- Succeeded by: Raymond Beaufils

Alderman of the Municipality of Newtown for Camden Ward
- In office 1 December 1928 – 2 January 1932
- In office 1 December 1934 – 31 December 1948

Personal details
- Born: Elizabeth Lilian Maud Gill; 7 June 1886 Cooma, New South Wales
- Died: 11 May 1954 (aged 67) Sydney
- Party: Labor (until c. 1941)
- Other political affiliations: Lang Labor
- Spouse: Albert Edward Fowler (m. 1909; sep. 1928)
- Occupation: Labor organiser

Elizabeth Lilian Maud Fowler MBE, JP (née Gill; 7 June 1886 – 11 May 1954) was an Australian politician. She was Australia's first female mayor, serving as mayor of Newtown, New South Wales, from 1937 to 1939. She later represented the seat of Newtown in the New South Wales Legislative Assembly from 1944 to 1950. She had a long involvement with the Lang Labor faction of the Australian Labor Party (ALP), which had evolved into a separate party by the time of her election to Parliament.

== Early life ==
Fowler was born at Cooma, New South Wales. She was the third daughter of Charles Munro Gill, who was a farmer, and Frances Rebecca, née Gaunson. After receiving a primary school education, she became closely involved in labour politics with the assistance of her father, a Labor League organiser and an Alderman, Valuer and Inspector of Nuisances for the Municipal District of Cooma. On 19 April 1909, while working as a waitress in Sydney, she married a bootmaker and widower, Albert Edward Fowler, at Whitefield Congregational Church. Her uncle, John Munro Gill (1838–1917), a boilermaker of Granville, also served as an Alderman of the Municipality of Granville (North Ward; 1898–1906). Her younger brother, Percy Thomas Algernon Gill (1889–1957), a labourer of Rosebery, served as an Alderman of the Municipality of Waterloo (1934–1937).

== Early political career ==
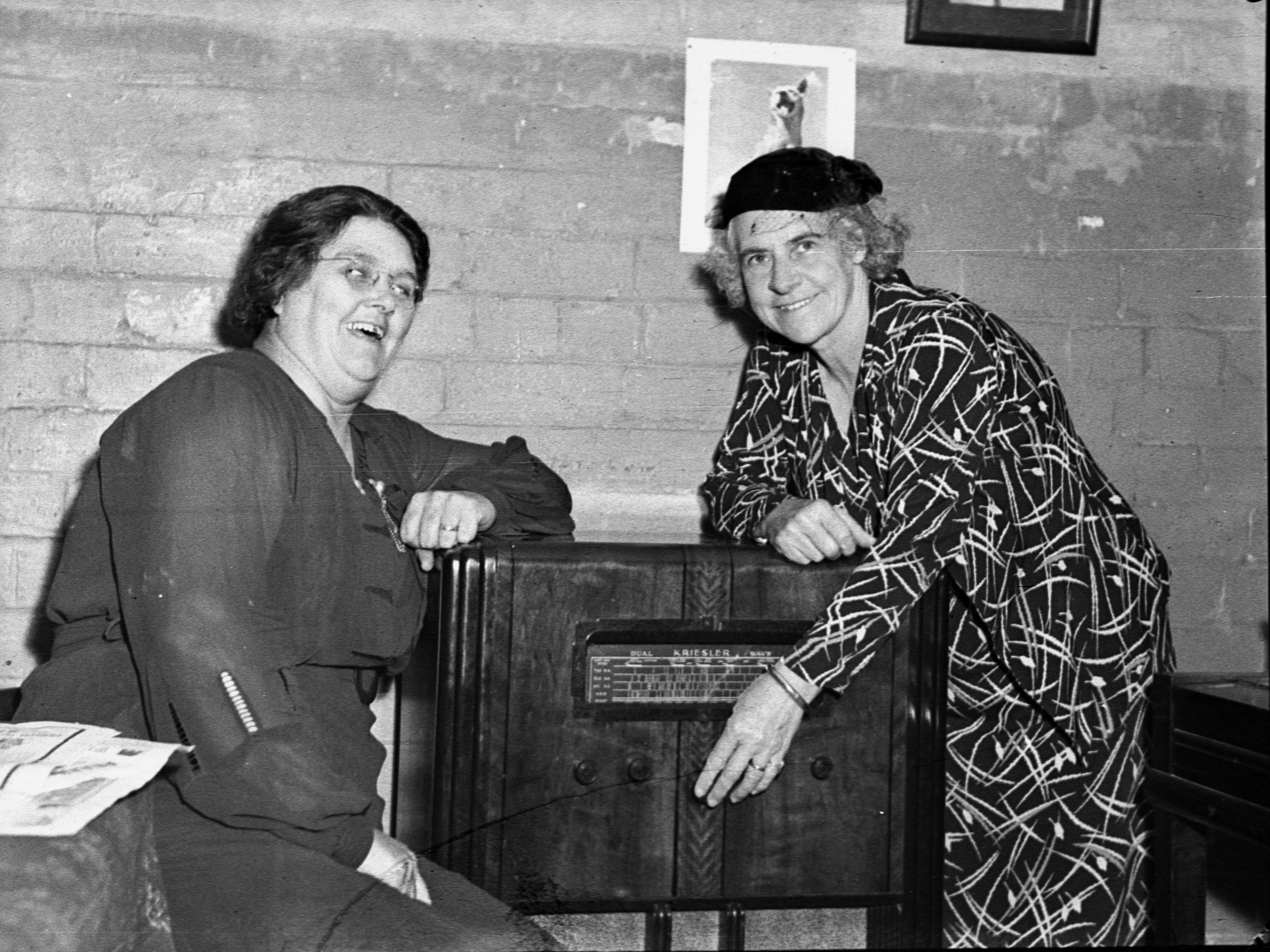
Mrs Lilian Fowler (Madame Mayor of Newtown 1938-1940) and Mrs Mary Jane Swift (Newtown Alderman 1941), 3 April 1938

Fowler was made secretary of the Newtown-Erskineville Political Labor League, and from 1917 managed the electorate of Newtown MP Frank Burke, an anti-conscriptionist. In 1921, she was appointed justice of the peace one of the first women so appointed.

Elected to the central executive of the Australian Labor Party 1920–21 and 1923–25, she and Jack Lang were behind the move to admit James Dooley at the 1923 conference. Fowler was also instrumental in the anti-corruption moves at the conference which led to the exposure of sliding-panel ballot boxes. She resigned from the central executive in 1932.

She was president of the Labor Women's Central Organising Committee 1926–27, lobbying New South Wales Premier Jack Lang to implement widows' pensions and child endowments. She also petitioned the governor regarding the appointment of women to the Legislative Council, and organised the first interstate Labor Women's conference.

In 1928, shortly after she separated from her husband, she was elected to Newtown Municipal Council. She was the first woman elected to any local council in New South Wales, holding office as an Alderman for Camden ward from 1934 to the Council's amalgamation with the City of Sydney in 1948. On 7 December 1937 Fowler made history again when she was elected as Australia's first female mayor, with her daughter serving as Mayoress. She was re-elected for a second term as mayor on 6 December 1938 and held the mayoralty until 1939, when the 10-member Labor caucus on Council decided on Raymond Beaufils, the President of the Enmore ALP Branch, as the next candidate for mayor and Fowler did not contest the vote.

In recognition of her achievements, Fowler was presented with an illuminated address signed by former Premier Lang and Federal shadow Minister Jack Beasley. A portrait depicting her in the robes of mayor was painted by Reginald Jack Shepherd (Ald. Mrs Fowler) and was a finalist in the 1938 Archibald Prize for portraiture.

== State politics ==
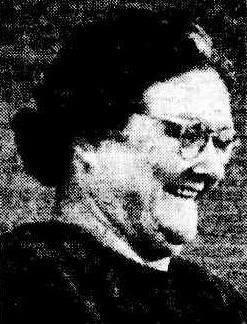
"Just call me Lil". Fowler as pictured in The Argus, on her election to state parliament in 1944.

In 1941, Fowler unsuccessfully ran against Burke for the seat of Newtown as an independent Labor candidate. She ran again as a Lang Labor candidate in 1944, campaigning for reduced taxation, better housing and more day nurseries and baby clinics. She defeated Burke and became the third woman elected to the New South Wales Legislative Assembly since its inception in 1856.

In Parliament, she condemned the Labor Party's centrist tendencies and opposed intervention from Canberra in New South Wales affairs. Her principal legislative achievement was an amendment to the Lunacy Act in 1944 to secure the release of Boyd Sinclair from a lunatic asylum, where he had been held since 1936, so that he could stand trial in a criminal court for the alleged murder of a Sydney taxi driver. (Note: Sixteen year old Boyd Sinclair was accused of murdering Sydney taxi driver John Smilie in 1936, found unfit to be tried on grounds of insanity, and confined without trial to a lunatic asylum. Fowler's 1944 legislative amendment permitted Sinclair to argue before a jury that he was fit to plead his case. A jury found that while Sinclair may have been insane at the time of the crime, he was now sane enough to be tried. Sinclair was arraigned before the Criminal Court where he pleaded not guilty, but was nonetheless convicted of the murder and resentenced to life imprisonment. Shortly afterward, he was again declared insane and returned to the asylum.) A fierce critic of bureaucracy, she supported regrouping local councils, and lost her own council seat when Newtown was merged with the City of Sydney in 1949. Fowler was re-elected in 1947, but was defeated in the 1950 election by the "official" Labor candidate Arthur Greenup. In 1953, she was unsuccessful in an attempt to win election to Sydney City Council.

== Later life and legacy ==
Fowler did not long survive her retirement from politics; she died in King George V Memorial Hospital on 11 May 1954 from coronary occlusion and was buried in Rookwood Cemetery with Methodist rites. She was survived by a daughter.

The federal division of Fowler is named for her, as is Fowler Place, in the Canberra suburb of Chisholm and Lillian Fowler Place in Marrickville. She was posthumously inducted onto the Victorian Honour Roll of Women in 2001.

== Notes ==
=== References ===
Civic offices
Preceded by Isidore Ryan	Mayor of Newtown; 1937–1939	Succeeded by Raymond Beaufils
New South Wales Legislative Assembly
Preceded by Frank Burke	Member for Newtown; 1944–1950	District abolished
