= Edmund Molesworth =

Australian politician

Edmund William Molesworth (1847 – 2 June 1923) was an English-born Australian politician.

He was born at Banbury in Oxfordshire to William Francis Molesworth and Caroline Ann Coombes. The family migrated to New South Wales around 1850, and Molesworth eventually worked as a customs and shipping agent. He married Clara Smith in 1874, with whom he had eight children. In 1889 he was elected to the New South Wales Legislative Assembly as the Free Trade member for Newtown. He held the seat until it was split in 1894, after which time he represented Newtown-Erskine. He was defeated in 1901. Molesworth died at Lindfield in 1923.

New South Wales Legislative Assembly
Preceded by Joseph Mitchell	Member for Newtown; 1889–1894; Served alongside: Hawken/Cotton; Abbott; none/Hindle	Abolished
New seat	Member for Newtown-Erskine; 1894–1901	Succeeded by Robert Hollis
