= Robert Hollis =

Australian politician

Robert Hollis (14 January 1851 – 25 May 1937) was an English-born Australian politician.

He was born at Belper in Derbyshire to labourer Robert Hollis and Mary Ann Wragg. He worked in the railways from the age of thirteen, becoming an engine driver in 1878. In 1875, he married Alice Turton at Ripley; they would have six children. Hollis was active in the local Liberal Party, and following his emigration to Australia he was a founding member of the Labour Party in 1891. A prominent member of the Locomotive Engine Drivers, Firemen and Cleaners Association, he was elected to the New South Wales Legislative Assembly in 1901 as the Labor member for Newtown-Erskine, moving to Newtown in 1904. He was a Labor backbencher until 1916, when he was expelled from the party for supporting conscription; he followed the Premier, William Holman, into the Nationalist Party, but was defeated at the elections in 1917. Hollis died at Ashfield in 1937.

New South Wales Legislative Assembly
| Preceded by Edmund Molesworth | Member for Newtown-Erskine; 1901–1904 | Abolished |
| New seat | Member for Newtown; 1904–1917 | Succeeded by Frank Burke |
