= Frederick Gibbes =

Australian politician (1839–1888)

Frederick Jamison Gibbes (31 October 1839 – 17 January 1888) was an Australian politician.

He was born at Regentville near Penrith to William Gibbes and Harriet Eliza née Jamison. His middle name was sometimes spelt Jamieson. He attended a variety of schools before studying at the University of Sydney, where he received a Bachelor of Arts in 1860. He then worked for the lands office until 1865, when he began studying for the bar. He was never successful in this, and instead entered business. On 18 April 1883, he married Mary Jane Gill, with whom he had two children. A Newtown alderman from 1882 to 1886, he was elected to the New South Wales Legislative Assembly for Newtown in 1882. When political parties emerged at the 1887 election, he joined the Free Trade Party and held the seat until his death the following year. He did not hold ministerial or parliamentary office.

His paternal grandfather, John George Nathaniel Gibbes, had been a significant figure in the first half of the 19th century, including as a member of the New South Wales Legislative Council, his maternal grandfather Sir John Jamison had large landholdings in the Penrith region, while his uncle, Robert Thomas Jamison, was a member of the Legislative Assembly.

Gibbes died at Moonbi on 17 January 1888 (aged 48), survived by his wife and two young children. He was considered to be independently wealthy, however his estate was declared bankrupt.

New South Wales Legislative Assembly
Preceded by William Foster; Joseph Mitchell	Member for Newtown; 1882 – 1888; With: Copeland / Mitchell / Foster none / Smith / Hawken	Succeeded by Joseph Abbott
