= Stephen Campbell Brown =

Australian politician

Stephen Campbell Brown (21 October 1829 – 16 October 1882) was an Australian politician.

He was born in Sydney to merchant John Brown and Frances Helen Watson. He was a solicitor's clerk, qualifying as a solicitor in 1852. In 1860 he married Emma Booth Jones; a second marriage on 20 August 1870 was to Jane Garrett.

In 1864 he was elected to the New South Wales Legislative Assembly for Newtown, holding the seat without any serious challenges until 1881. On 14 November 1881 he accepted as Postmaster-General in the third Parkes ministry and the following day resigned from the assembly to be appointed to the Legislative Council. He became embroiled in a dispute with the Sydney newspapers about how much they were charged for telegrams and resigned as Postmaster-General on 22 August 1882.

He died in Sydney on 16 October 1882 (aged 52), survived by four children from his first marriage, his second wife Jane and three of their children.

Parliament of New South Wales
Political offices
Preceded by Francis Suttor	Postmaster-General; 1881 – 1882	Succeeded by Alexander Campbell
New South Wales Legislative Assembly
Preceded by Thomas Holt	Member for Newtown; 1864 – 1881; Served alongside: none/William Foster	Succeeded by Joseph Mitchell
