= Joseph Mitchell (politician) =

Australian politician

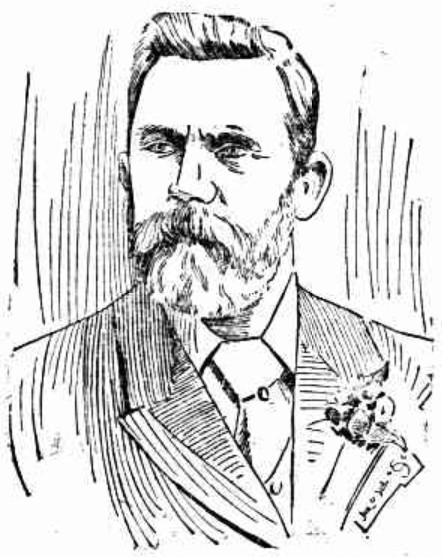
Joseph Mitchell (Unknown artist, Evening News (Sydney) on 23 October 1897, Page 6).

Joseph Earl Cherry Mitchell (22 July 1840 – 22 October 1897) was an English-born Australian politician and businessman.

He was born in Cheshire to shipbuilder Richard Mitchell and Margaret Cherry. He was his father's apprentice when they arrived in New South Wales in 1859. He then established himself in Newtown as a coal merchant, subsequently becoming a successful figure in the coal industry. From around 1890 until his death, he tried unsuccessfully to establish an iron and steel making venture.

In 1866 he married Charlotte Harrison at Bowral; they had eight children. He was a Methodist.

Mitchell was elected four times to the New South Wales Legislative Assembly.

== Business career ==
Mitchell began as a coal merchant and did much to popularise coal from the Western coalfields around Lithgow. He later acquired interests in collieries and shipping, including a major interest in both the South Bulli Mine and the Bellambi Colliery.

From around 1890 up to his death in 1897, Mitchell led efforts to form a syndicate of English capitalists, to set up an iron and steel works, and to win a contract to supply the N.S.W. Government with steel rails. His endeavours were complicated by both the lukewarm support of labour unions—who were in favour of a state-owned iron and steel industry in New South Wales—and the fraudulent efforts of Alfred John Lambert. G & C Hoskins emerged as a rival for the contract but only if it were subject to a protective tariff. Mitchell continued to argue that the industry could be established, without protection.

Unfortunately, although Mitchell eventually won the contract in 1897, he died before he could fulfil it. Although Mitchell had earlier considered the Illawarra as a location for his iron and steel works, the final form of his proposal was that the works were to be sited adjacent to the (former) Pipers Flat railway station, near Wallerawang, and would have exploited nearby deposits of iron ore, limestone and coal. The works were never built.

== Political career ==
Mitchell was first elected to the New South Wales Legislative Assembly in 1881 as the member for Newtown, but he was defeated the following year. He returned to the Assembly in 1883, but was defeated again in 1885. In 1888 he was elected as a Free Trader and was re-elected for Illawarra in 1889, but he was in Europe at the time of nominations for the 1891 election and therefore was unable to contest. He unsuccessfully contested a by-election later in the same year, and contested Woronora in 1894 and Newtown-Camperdown in 1895, without success.

In the early 1880s, his political views were in favour of free trade and, generally, in support of the government of Henry Parkes but he was not originally a member of the political grouping led by Parkes. After the Free Trade Party was formed (1887), he stood as a Free Trade Party candidate.

== Death and legacy ==
He died at his home, 'Milton House' at Bellambi, on 22 October 1897, of cancer. His grave is in the Methodist section of Rookwood Cemetery.

Mitchell Road, Alexandria, N.S.W. is named after him.

New South Wales Legislative Assembly
Preceded by Stephen Brown	Member for Newtown; 1881–1882; Served alongside: William Foster	Succeeded by Henry Copeland; Frederick Gibbes
Preceded by Henry Copeland	Member for Newtown; 1883–1885; Served alongside: Frederick Gibbes	Succeeded by William Foster; James Smith
Preceded by William Foster; Frederick Gibbes	Member for Newtown; 1888–1889; Served alongside: Joseph Abbott, Nicholas Hawken	Succeeded by Edmund Molesworth
Preceded by Francis Woodward	Member for Illawarra; 1889–1891; Served alongside: Francis Woodward	Succeeded by Andrew Lysaght; John Nicholson
