= Electoral district of Newtown-Camperdown =

Former state electoral district of New South Wales, Australia

Newtown-Camperdown was an electoral district of the Legislative Assembly in the Australian state of New South Wales, created in 1894 with the division of the multi-member district of Newtown and named after and including the inner Sydney suburb of Camperdown. It was replaced by the Electoral district of Camperdown in 1904.

== Members for Newtown-Camperdown ==
Member	Party	Term
Joseph Abbott	Free Trade	1894–1895
Francis Cotton	Free Trade	1895–1901
James Smith	Ind. Progressive	1901–1904

== Election results ==
1901 New South Wales state election: Newtown-Camperdown
Party	Candidate	Votes	%	±%
Ind. Progressive	James Smith	759	35.1	+10.2
Liberal Reform	Thomas Probert	562	26.0	−1.3
Independent Liberal	William Clegg	382	17.7	
Labour	Samuel Heaton	270	12.5	+7.2
Independent Liberal	Richard Bellemey	165	7.6	
Socialist Labor	Andrew Thomson	24	1.1	
Total formal votes		2,162	99.0	+0.5
Informal votes		22	1.0	−0.5
Turnout		2,184	62.6	+0.8
Ind. Progressive gain from Liberal Reform				

The sitting member was Francis Cotton (Liberal Reform) who did not contest the election.
