= James Francis Smith (politician) =

Australian politician

James Francis Smith (c. 1844 – 27 October 1908) was an Australian politician.

He was born in Wellington to pastoralist William Smith and Mary Ann Williamson. He attended Christ Church School in Sydney and worked as a solicitor's clerk and then cattle dealer before establishing a butchery business around 1868. On 25 May 1868, he married Clara Linda Potter Leslie; they would have thirteen children.

Smith was a Newtown alderman from 1871 to 1908, serving four separate terms as mayor. In 1885, he was elected to the New South Wales Legislative Assembly as the member for Newtown. With the emergence of the first party system in the next few years, Smith gravitated to the Protectionist Party. He lost his seat in 1887 and continued to regularly contest elections until he was successful at winning the seat of Newtown-Camperdown in 1901. In 1904, he was re-elected as a Progressive in Camperdown, but he was defeated as an independent in 1907. Smith died at Newtown the following year.

Civic offices
Preceded by William Bailey	Mayor of Newtown; 1877 – 1878	Succeeded by Alfred Fallick
Preceded by Alfred Fallick	Mayor of Newtown; 1879 – 1880	Succeeded by Daniel Wildman
Preceded by Charles Boots	Mayor of Newtown; 1884 – 1886	Succeeded by Charles Whately
Preceded by Harold Thomas Morgan	Mayor of Newtown; 1896 – 1897	Succeeded by William Cox
New South Wales Legislative Assembly
Preceded by Frederick Gibbes; Joseph Mitchell	Member for Newtown; 1885 – 1887; Served alongside: William Foster, Frederick Gibbes	Succeeded by Nicholas Hawken
Preceded by Francis Cotton	Member for Newtown-Camperdown; 1901 – 1904	District abolished
New district	Member for Camperdown; 1904 – 1907	Succeeded by Robert Stuart-Robertson
