= Electoral district of Newtown-Erskine =

Former state electoral district of New South Wales, Australia

Newtown-Erskine was an electoral district of the Legislative Assembly in the Australian state of New South Wales, created in 1894 with the division of the multi-member district of Newtown and named after the inner Sydney suburb of Erskineville or George Erskine, a Wesleyan minister, after whom it was named. Along with Newtown-St Peters, it was partly replaced by a recreated Newtown in 1904.

== Members for Newtown-Erskine ==
Member	Party	Term
Edmund Molesworth	Free Trade	1894–1901
Robert Hollis	Labor	1901–1904

== Election results ==
1901 New South Wales state election: Newtown-Erskine
Party	Candidate	Votes	%	±%
Labour	Robert Hollis	921	49.7	
Liberal Reform	Edmund Molesworth	886	47.8	−13.5
Independent Liberal	Leopold Bertram	46	2.5	+2.5
Total formal votes		1,853	99.3	−0.5
Informal votes		14	0.8	+0.5
Turnout		1,867	61.0	+1.3
Labour gain from Liberal Reform				
