= Electoral district of Newtown =

State electoral district of New South Wales, Australia

Newtown New South Wales—Legislative Assembly
- Interactive map of district boundaries from the 2023 state election
- State: New South Wales
- Dates current: 1859–1894; 1904–1920; 1927–1950; 2015–present
- MP: Jenny Leong
- Party: Greens
- Namesake: Newtown
- Electors: 56,412 (2019)
- Area: 10.29 km^{2} (4.0 sq mi)
- Demographic: Inner-metropolitan
Electorates around Newtown:
Summer Hill	Balmain	Sydney
Summer Hill	Newtown	Heffron
Summer Hill	Heffron	Heffron

Newtown is an electoral district of the Legislative Assembly in the Australian state of New South Wales. It is named after the inner Sydney suburb of Newtown, at the centre of the district.

Since 2015 the member for Newtown has been Jenny Leong of the Greens. Following the 2023 state election Newtown is one of three seats held by the Greens.

== Geography ==
On its current boundaries, Newtown includes the suburbs of Redfern, Chippendale, Darlington, Eveleigh, Newtown, Enmore, Stanmore and Petersham and parts of Waterloo, Erskineville, Camperdown, Marrickville and Lewisham. It is held by Jenny Leong of the Greens.

== History ==
Newtown was originally created in 1859, and named after and including Newtown. It elected one member from 1859 to 1880, two members from 1880 to 1885, three members from 1885 to 1891 and four members from 1891 to 1894. With the abolition of multi-member constituencies in 1894, it was replaced by Newtown-Camperdown, Newtown-Erskine, Newtown-St Peters and Marrickville.

Newtown was re-created in 1904 as a result of the 1903 New South Wales referendum, which required the number of members of the Legislative Assembly to be reduced from 125 to 90 which saw the districts of Newtown-Camperdown, Newtown-Erskine and Newtown-St Peters abolished and replaced by Newtown and Camperdown.

In 1920, with the introduction of proportional representation, it was absorbed into Botany. Newtown was recreated in 1927 and combined with part of Annandale and renamed Newtown-Annandale in 1950.

Newtown was recreated at the 2013 redistribution, partly replacing Marrickville.

== Members for Newtown ==
Single-member (1859–1880)
Member	Party	Term
Alexander McArthur	None	1859–1861
Thomas Holt	None	1861–1864
Stephen Brown	None	1864–1880

Two members (1880–1885)
Member	Party	Term	Member	Party	Term
Stephen Brown	None	1880–1881	William Foster	None	1880–1882
Joseph Mitchell	None	1881–1882	William Foster	None	1880–1882
Henry Copeland	None	1882–1883	Frederick Gibbes	None	1882–1885
Joseph Mitchell	None	1883–1885	Frederick Gibbes	None	1882–1885

Three members (1885–1891)
Member	Party	Term	Member	Party	Term	Member	Party	Term
James Francis Smith	None	1885–1887	Frederick Gibbes	None	1885–1888	William Foster	None	1885–1888
Nicholas Hawken	Free Trade	1887–1891	Frederick Gibbes	Free Trade	1887–1888	William Foster	Free Trade	1887–1888
Nicholas Hawken	Free Trade	1887–1891	Joseph Abbott	Free Trade	1888–1891	Joseph Mitchell	Free Trade	1888–1889
Nicholas Hawken	Free Trade	1887–1891	Joseph Abbott	Free Trade	1888–1891	Edmund Molesworth	Free Trade	1889–1891

Four members (1891–1894)
Member	Party	Term	Member	Party	Term	Member	Party	Term	Member	Party	Term
Francis Cotton	Labor	1891–1894	Edmund Molesworth	Free Trade	1891–1894	Joseph Abbott	Free Trade	1891–1894	John Hindle	Labor	1891–1894

Single-member (1904–1920)
Member	Party	Term
Robert Hollis	Labor	1904–1916
Robert Hollis	Nationalist	1916–1917
Frank Burke	Labor	1917–1920
Single-member (1927–1950)
Member	Party	Term
Frank Burke	Labor	1927–1939
Frank Burke	Industrial Labor	1939–1939
Frank Burke	Labor	1939–1944
Lilian Fowler	Lang Labor	1944–1950
Single-member (2015–present)
Member	Party	Term
Jenny Leong	Greens	2015–present

== Election results ==
2023 New South Wales state election: Newtown
Party	Candidate	Votes	%	±%
Greens	Jenny Leong	26,758	54.1	+9.9
Labor	David Hetherington	15,104	30.5	+1.9
Liberal	Fiona Douskou	6,365	12.9	−1.7
Sustainable Australia	Christopher Thomas	1,275	2.6	+0.8
Total formal votes		49,502	98.5	+0.6
Informal votes		769	1.5	−0.6
Turnout		50,271	84.4	−0.8
Notional two-party-preferred count
Labor	David Hetherington	35,145	82.3	+4.1
Liberal	Fiona Douskou	7,553	17.7	−4.1
Two-candidate-preferred result
Greens	Jenny Leong	28,015	62.1	+0.7
Labor	David Hetherington	17,094	37.9	−0.7
Greens hold		Swing	+0.7	
