= Electoral results for the district of Marrickville =

Election results for Marrickville, New South Wales, Australia

Marrickville, an electoral district of the Legislative Assembly in the Australian state of New South Wales, has had two incarnations, the first from 1894 to 1920, the second from 1927 to 2015.

| Election | Member | Party |
|---|---|---|
| 1894 | Francis McLean | Free Trade |
| 1895 | Francis McLean | Free Trade |
| 1898 | Francis McLean | Free Trade |
| 1901 | Richard McCoy | Liberal Reform |
| 1904 | Richard McCoy | Liberal Reform |
| 1907 | Richard McCoy | Liberal Reform |
| 1910 | Thomas Crawford | Labor |
| 1913 | Thomas Crawford | Labor / Nationalist |
| 1917 | Carlo Lazzarini | Labor |
| Election | Member | Party |
| 1927 | Carlo Lazzarini | Labor |
| 1930 | Carlo Lazzarini | Labor |
| 1932 | Carlo Lazzarini | Labor (NSW) |
| 1935 | Carlo Lazzarini | Labor (NSW) |
| 1938 | Carlo Lazzarini | Industrial Labor |
| 1941 | Carlo Lazzarini | Labor |
| 1944 | Carlo Lazzarini | Labor |
| 1947 | Carlo Lazzarini | Labor |
| 1950 | Carlo Lazzarini | Labor |
| 1953 | Norm Ryan | Labor |
| 1956 | Norm Ryan | Labor |
| 1959 | Norm Ryan | Labor |
| 1962 | Norm Ryan | Labor |
| 1965 | Norm Ryan | Labor |
| 1968 | Norm Ryan | Labor |
| 1971 | Norm Ryan | Labor |
| 1973 | Tom Cahill | Labor |
| 1976 | Tom Cahill | Labor |
| 1978 | Tom Cahill | Labor |
| 1981 | Tom Cahill | Labor |
| 1983 by | Andrew Refshauge | Labor |
| 1984 | Andrew Refshauge | Labor |
| 1988 | Andrew Refshauge | Labor |
| 1991 | Andrew Refshauge | Labor |
| 1995 | Andrew Refshauge | Labor |
| 1999 | Andrew Refshauge | Labor |
| 2003 | Andrew Refshauge | Labor |
| 2005 by | Carmel Tebbutt | Labor |
| 2007 | Carmel Tebbutt | Labor |
| 2011 | Carmel Tebbutt | Labor |

== Election results ==
=== Elections in the 2010s ===
==== 2011 ====
2011 New South Wales state election: Marrickville
| Party | Candidate | Votes | % | ±% |
|---|---|---|---|---|
| Labor | Carmel Tebbutt | 17,413 | 38.1 | −8.5 |
| Greens | Fiona Byrne | 16,395 | 35.9 | +3.3 |
| Liberal | Rosana Tyler | 8,714 | 19.1 | +6.5 |
| Socialist Alliance | Pip Hinman | 860 | 1.9 | +0.3 |
| Independent | Paul Quealy | 817 | 1.8 | +1.8 |
| Socialist Equality | James Cogan | 572 | 1.3 | +1.3 |
| Christian Democrats | Kylie Laurence | 531 | 1.2 | −0.3 |
| Family First | Jimmy Liem | 395 | 0.9 | +0.9 |
| Total formal votes | | 45,697 | 97.1 | +0.2 |
| Informal votes | | 1,377 | 2.9 | −0.2 |
| Turnout | | 47,074 | 90.2 | +0.3 |
Notional two-party-preferred count
| Labor | Carmel Tebbutt | 24,777 | 70.4 | −10.9 |
| Liberal | Rosana Tyler | 10,435 | 29.6 | +10.9 |
Two-candidate-preferred result
| Labor | Carmel Tebbutt | 19,046 | 50.9 | −6.6 |
| Greens | Fiona Byrne | 18,370 | 49.1 | +6.6 |
| Labor hold | | Swing | −6.6 | |

=== Elections in the 2000s ===
==== 2007 ====
2007 New South Wales state election: Marrickville
| Party | Candidate | Votes | % | ±% |
|---|---|---|---|---|
| Labor | Carmel Tebbutt | 19,683 | 46.6 | −1.1 |
| Greens | Fiona Byrne | 13,735 | 32.5 | +4.1 |
| Liberal | Ramzy Mansour | 5,305 | 12.6 | −0.2 |
| Independent | Angus Wood | 716 | 1.7 | +1.7 |
| Democrats | Martine Eve-Macleod | 688 | 1.6 | −0.8 |
| Socialist Alliance | Pip Hinman | 666 | 1.6 | −1.0 |
| Christian Democrats | Joseph Tuiletufuga | 634 | 1.5 | +1.5 |
| Unity | Grace Chen | 557 | 1.3 | −0.8 |
| | Patrick O'Connor | 216 | 0.5 | +0.5 |
| Total formal votes | | 42,200 | 96.9 | 0.0 |
| Informal votes | | 1,340 | 3.1 | 0.0 |
| Turnout | | 43,540 | 90.5 | |
Notional two-party-preferred count
| Labor | Carmel Tebbutt | 28,379 | 81.2 | −0.1 |
| Liberal | Ramzy Mansour | 6,557 | 18.8 | +0.1 |
Two-candidate-preferred result
| Labor | Carmel Tebbutt | 21,073 | 57.5 | −2.5 |
| Greens | Fiona Byrne | 15,588 | 42.5 | +2.5 |
| Labor hold | | Swing | −2.5 | |

==== 2005 by-election ====
2005 Marrickville by-election Saturday 17 September
| Party | Candidate | Votes | % | ±% |
|---|---|---|---|---|
| Labor | Carmel Tebbutt | 17,428 | 49.79 | +1.39 |
| Greens | Sam Byrne | 13,638 | 38.96 | +10.49 |
| Christian Democrats | Saidi Goldstein | 1,066 | 3.05 | +3.05 |
| Democrats | Michelle Bleicher | 977 | 2.79 | +0.28 |
| Socialist Alliance | Pip Hinman | 526 | 1.50 | −1.22 |
| Save Our Suburbs | Lorraine Thompson | 484 | 1.38 | +0.01 |
| Independent | Chris McLachlan | 397 | 1.13 | +1.13 |
| Independent | Malcolm Woodward | 344 | 0.98 | +0.98 |
| | Alasdair MacDonald | 144 | 0.41 | +0.41 |
| Total formal votes | | 35,004 | 97.32 | |
| Informal votes | | 1,012 | 2.68 | |
| Turnout | | 36,016 | 78.25 | |
Two-candidate-preferred result
| Labor | Carmel Tebbutt | 18,059 | 55.07 | −5.63 |
| Greens | Sam Byrne | 14,731 | 44.93 | +5.63 |
| Labor hold | | Swing | −5.63 | |

Andrew Refshauge (Labor) resigned.

==== 2003 ====
2003 New South Wales state election: Marrickville
| Party | Candidate | Votes | % | ±% |
|---|---|---|---|---|
| Labor | Andrew Refshauge | 18,885 | 48.4 | −5.4 |
| Greens | Colin Hesse | 11,109 | 28.5 | +16.7 |
| Liberal | Ramzy Mansour | 5,005 | 12.8 | −0.7 |
| Socialist Alliance | Sue Johnson | 1,061 | 2.7 | +2.7 |
| Democrats | David Mendelssohn | 979 | 2.5 | −6.1 |
| Unity | Henson Liang | 843 | 2.2 | −0.1 |
| Independent | Richard Rae | 600 | 1.5 | +1.5 |
| Save Our Suburbs | Lorraine Thomson | 533 | 1.4 | +1.4 |
| Total formal votes | | 39,015 | 96.9 | +0.2 |
| Informal votes | | 1,264 | 3.1 | −0.2 |
| Turnout | | 40,279 | 88.4 | |
Notional two-party-preferred count
| Labor | Andrew Refshauge | 25,123 | 81.5 | +2.1 |
| Liberal | Ramzy Mansour | 5,700 | 18.5 | −2.1 |
Two-candidate-preferred result
| Labor | Andrew Refshauge | 20,037 | 60.7 | −10.8 |
| Greens | Colin Hesse | 12,974 | 39.3 | +10.8 |
| Labor hold | | Swing | −10.8 | |

=== Elections in the 1990s ===
==== 1999 ====
1999 New South Wales state election: Marrickville
| Party | Candidate | Votes | % | ±% |
|---|---|---|---|---|
| Labor | Andrew Refshauge | 21,311 | 53.8 | +7.1 |
| Liberal | Jonathan Morris | 5,351 | 13.5 | −1.3 |
| Greens | Sean Roberts | 4,662 | 11.8 | +5.1 |
| Democrats | Peter Kenyon | 3,425 | 8.6 | +4.0 |
| One Nation | Jill Brown | 1,661 | 4.2 | +4.2 |
| Independent | Morris Tadros | 989 | 2.5 | +2.5 |
| Unity | Gordon The | 904 | 2.3 | +2.3 |
| Christian Democrats | Christopher Hallett | 607 | 1.5 | +1.2 |
| Democratic Socialist | Tuntuni Bhattacharyya | 443 | 1.1 | +0.2 |
| Euthanasia Referendum | Ann Overend | 279 | 0.7 | +0.7 |
| Total formal votes | | 39,632 | 96.7 | +3.0 |
| Informal votes | | 1,370 | 3.3 | −3.0 |
| Turnout | | 41,002 | 89.5 | |
Notional two-party-preferred count
| Labor | Andrew Refshauge | 26,389 | 79.4 | +4.6 |
| Liberal | Jonathan Morris | 6,835 | 20.6 | −4.6 |
Two-candidate-preferred result
| Labor | Andrew Refshauge | 23,524 | 71.5 | −3.4 |
| Greens | Sean Roberts | 9,394 | 28.5 | +28.5 |
| Labor hold | | Swing | −3.4 | |

==== 1995 ====
1995 New South Wales state election: Marrickville
| Party | Candidate | Votes | % | ±% |
|---|---|---|---|---|
| Labor | Andrew Refshauge | 15,587 | 47.6 | −7.3 |
| No Aircraft Noise | Kevin Butler | 7,748 | 23.6 | +23.6 |
| Liberal | Ken Henderson | 4,346 | 13.3 | −11.7 |
| Greens | Bruce Welch | 2,394 | 7.3 | −5.7 |
| Democrats | Keiran Passmore | 1,798 | 5.5 | −1.8 |
| Democratic Socialist | Karen Fletcher | 450 | 1.4 | +1.4 |
| Independent | Meira Kurfurst | 442 | 1.3 | +1.3 |
| Total formal votes | | 32,765 | 94.4 | +7.9 |
| Informal votes | | 1,962 | 5.6 | −7.9 |
| Turnout | | 34,727 | 90.6 | |
Two-candidate-preferred result
| Labor | Andrew Refshauge | 18,022 | 60.5 | −9.4 |
| No Aircraft Noise | Kevin Butler | 11,790 | 39.5 | +39.5 |
| Labor hold | | Swing | −9.4 | |

==== 1991 ====
1991 New South Wales state election: Marrickville
| Party | Candidate | Votes | % | ±% |
|---|---|---|---|---|
| Labor | Andrew Refshauge | 15,474 | 54.8 | +7.3 |
| Liberal | Jack Cassimatis | 7,040 | 24.9 | +2.3 |
| Greens | Bruce Welch | 3,659 | 13.0 | +13.0 |
| Democrats | Peter Hennessy | 2,050 | 7.3 | −2.8 |
| Total formal votes | | 28,223 | 86.5 | −7.8 |
| Informal votes | | 4,415 | 13.5 | +7.8 |
| Turnout | | 32,638 | 89.8 | |
Two-party-preferred result
| Labor | Andrew Refshauge | 18,293 | 69.8 | +2.6 |
| Liberal | Jack Cassimatis | 7,902 | 30.2 | −2.6 |
| Labor hold | | Swing | +2.6 | |

=== Elections in the 1980s ===
==== 1988 ====
1988 New South Wales state election: Marrickville
| Party | Candidate | Votes | % | ±% |
|---|---|---|---|---|
| Labor | Andrew Refshauge | 13,080 | 47.7 | −18.5 |
| Liberal | Jack Cassimatis | 7,364 | 26.9 | +4.4 |
| Democrats | Michael Walsh | 3,521 | 12.9 | +1.5 |
| Socialist | James Donovan | 1,794 | 6.5 | +6.5 |
| Independent EFF | Ray Barakat | 1,639 | 6.0 | +6.0 |
| Total formal votes | | 27,398 | 93.2 | −1.8 |
| Informal votes | | 1,986 | 6.8 | +1.8 |
| Turnout | | 29,384 | 89.5 | |
Two-party-preferred result
| Labor | Andrew Refshauge | 16,046 | 65.5 | −7.2 |
| Liberal | Jack Cassimatis | 8,443 | 34.5 | +7.2 |
| Labor hold | | Swing | −7.2 | |

==== 1984 ====
1984 New South Wales state election: Marrickville
| Party | Candidate | Votes | % | ±% |
|---|---|---|---|---|
| Labor | Andrew Refshauge | 16,890 | 66.3 | −5.0 |
| Liberal | Peter Rout | 5,422 | 21.3 | +2.0 |
| Democrats | Michael Walsh | 3,164 | 12.4 | +9.4 |
| Total formal votes | | 25,476 | 95.2 | +1.8 |
| Informal votes | | 1,297 | 4.8 | −1.8 |
| Turnout | | 26,773 | 90.3 | +2.9 |
Two-party-preferred result
| Labor | Andrew Refshauge | | 73.4 | −4.6 |
| Liberal | Peter Rout | | 26.6 | +4.6 |
| Labor hold | | Swing | −4.6 | |

==== 1983 by-election ====
1983 Marrickville by-election Saturday 22 October
| Party | Candidate | Votes | % | ±% |
|---|---|---|---|---|
| Labor | Andrew Refshauge | 13,018 | 61.7 | −9.6 |
| Liberal | John Kekis | 4,496 | 21.3 | +2.0 |
| Democrats | Rodney Dominish | 2,311 | 11.0 | +8.0 |
| Socialist Party | David Gibson | 1,072 | 5.1 | −1.3 |
| Independent | Nadar Ponnuswamy | 216 | 1.0 | |
| Total formal votes | | 21,113 | 95.6 | |
| Informal votes | | 965 | 4.4 | |
| Turnout | | 22,078 | 75.3 | |
| Labor hold | | Swing | | |

Tom Cahill (Labor) died.

==== 1981 ====
1981 New South Wales state election: Marrickville
| Party | Candidate | Votes | % | ±% |
|---|---|---|---|---|
| Labor | Tom Cahill | 17,120 | 71.3 | −2.9 |
| Liberal | John Kekis | 4,636 | 19.3 | +0.4 |
| Socialist | Christopher Taylor | 1,533 | 6.4 | −0.5 |
| Democrats | Anthony Larkings | 724 | 3.0 | +3.0 |
| Total formal votes | | 24,013 | 93.4 | |
| Informal votes | | 1,703 | 6.6 | |
| Turnout | | 25,716 | 87.4 | |
Two-party-preferred result
| Labor | Tom Cahill | 17,820 | 78.0 | −1.8 |
| Liberal | John Kekis | 5,036 | 22.0 | +1.8 |
| Labor hold | | Swing | −1.8 | |

=== Elections in the 1970s ===
==== 1978 ====
1978 New South Wales state election: Marrickville
| Party | Candidate | Votes | % | ±% |
|---|---|---|---|---|
| Labor | Tom Cahill | 22,667 | 74.2 | +2.2 |
| Liberal | Costa Lianos | 5,769 | 18.9 | −6.1 |
| Socialist | David Gibson | 2,115 | 6.9 | +6.9 |
| Total formal votes | | 30,551 | 95.3 | −1.3 |
| Informal votes | | 1,505 | 4.7 | +1.3 |
| Turnout | | 32,056 | 88.2 | −0.5 |
Two-party-preferred result
| Labor | Tom Cahill | 24,327 | 79.8 | +5.5 |
| Liberal | Costa Lianos | 6,158 | 20.2 | −5.5 |
| Labor hold | | Swing | +5.5 | |

==== 1976 ====
1976 New South Wales state election: Marrickville
| Party | Candidate | Votes | % | ±% |
|---|---|---|---|---|
| Labor | Tom Cahill | 21,629 | 72.0 | +5.2 |
| Liberal | Costa Lianos | 7,497 | 25.0 | −3.4 |
| Socialist Workers | Geoffrey Payne | 899 | 3.0 | +3.0 |
| Total formal votes | | 30,025 | 96.6 | +1.5 |
| Informal votes | | 1,045 | 3.4 | −1.5 |
| Turnout | | 31,070 | 88.7 | −1.3 |
Two-party-preferred result
| Labor | Tom Cahill | 22,311 | 74.3 | +6.6 |
| Liberal | Costa Lianos | 7,714 | 25.7 | −6.6 |
| Labor hold | | Swing | +6.6 | |

==== 1973 ====
1973 New South Wales state election: Marrickville
| Party | Candidate | Votes | % | ±% |
|---|---|---|---|---|
| Labor | Tom Cahill | 17,972 | 66.8 | +3.3 |
| Liberal | George Lamont | 7,634 | 28.4 | −8.1 |
| Democratic Labor | Anthony Kiely | 1,315 | 4.9 | +4.9 |
| Total formal votes | | 26,921 | 95.1 | |
| Informal votes | | 1,379 | 4.9 | |
| Turnout | | 28,300 | 90.0 | |
Two-party-preferred result
| Labor | Tom Cahill | 18,235 | 67.7 | +4.2 |
| Liberal | George Lamont | 8,686 | 32.3 | −4.2 |
| Labor hold | | Swing | +4.2 | |

==== 1971 ====
1971 New South Wales state election: Marrickville
| Party | Candidate | Votes | % | ±% |
|---|---|---|---|---|
| Labor | Norm Ryan | 15,780 | 63.5 | −0.6 |
| Liberal | Jonathan Fowler | 9,060 | 36.5 | +0.6 |
| Total formal votes | | 24,840 | 96.3 | |
| Informal votes | | 949 | 3.7 | |
| Turnout | | 25,789 | 91.2 | |
| Labor hold | | Swing | −0.6 | |

=== Elections in the 1960s ===
==== 1968 ====
1968 New South Wales state election: Marrickville
| Party | Candidate | Votes | % | ±% |
|---|---|---|---|---|
| Labor | Norm Ryan | 15,060 | 64.1 | +0.4 |
| Liberal | Jonathan Fowler | 8,427 | 35.9 | −0.4 |
| Total formal votes | | 23,487 | 96.3 | |
| Informal votes | | 908 | 3.7 | |
| Turnout | | 24,395 | 92.6 | |
| Labor hold | | Swing | +0.4 | |

==== 1965 ====
1965 New South Wales state election: Marrickville
| Party | Candidate | Votes | % | ±% |
|---|---|---|---|---|
| Labor | Norm Ryan | 13,448 | 63.7 | −4.2 |
| Liberal | Neville Glass | 7,654 | 36.3 | +6.1 |
| Total formal votes | | 21,102 | 97.3 | −1.0 |
| Informal votes | | 585 | 2.7 | +1.0 |
| Turnout | | 21,687 | 92.5 | −0.2 |
| Labor hold | | Swing | −5.4 | |

==== 1962 ====
1962 New South Wales state election: Marrickville
| Party | Candidate | Votes | % | ±% |
|---|---|---|---|---|
| Labor | Norm Ryan | 16,010 | 67.9 | −1.1 |
| Liberal | Bruce Fry | 7,117 | 30.2 | −0.8 |
| Independent | William McCristal | 465 | 2.0 | +2.0 |
| Total formal votes | | 23,592 | 98.3 | |
| Informal votes | | 418 | 1.7 | |
| Turnout | | 24,010 | 92.7 | |
Two-party-preferred result
| Labor | Norm Ryan | 16,302 | 69.1 | +0.1 |
| Liberal | Bruce Fry | 7,290 | 30.9 | −0.1 |
| Labor hold | | Swing | +0.1 | |

=== Elections in the 1950s ===
==== 1959 ====
1959 New South Wales state election: Marrickville
| Party | Candidate | Votes | % | ±% |
|---|---|---|---|---|
| Labor | Norm Ryan | 14,546 | 69.0 | |
| Liberal | Michael Lazar | 6,542 | 31.0 | |
| Total formal votes | | 21,088 | 97.7 | |
| Informal votes | | 501 | 2.3 | |
| Turnout | | 21,589 | 93.9 | |
| Labor hold | | Swing | | |

==== 1956 ====
1956 New South Wales state election: Marrickville
| Party | Candidate | Votes | % | ±% |
|---|---|---|---|---|
| Labor | Norm Ryan | 12,093 | 61.4 | −19.4 |
| Liberal | Ian Chisholm | 6,352 | 32.2 | +32.2 |
| Communist | Adam Ogston | 652 | 3.3 | +3.3 |
| Republican | William McCristal | 602 | 3.1 | +3.1 |
| Total formal votes | | 19,699 | 97.7 | +3.6 |
| Informal votes | | 472 | 2.3 | −3.6 |
| Turnout | | 20,171 | 93.6 | −0.5 |
Two-party-preferred result
| Labor | Norm Ryan | 12,981 | 65.9 | −14.9 |
| Liberal | Ian Chisholm | 6,718 | 34.1 | +34.1 |
| Labor hold | | Swing | N/A | |

==== 1953 ====
1953 New South Wales state election: Marrickville
| Party | Candidate | Votes | % | ±% |
|---|---|---|---|---|
| Labor | Phillip Ryan | 16,893 | 80.8 | |
| Independent | William McCristal | 4,018 | 19.2 | |
| Total formal votes | | 20,911 | 94.1 | |
| Informal votes | | 1,320 | 5.9 | |
| Turnout | | 22,231 | 94.1 | |
| Labor hold | | Swing | | |

==== 1950 ====
1950 New South Wales state election: Marrickville
| Party | Candidate | Votes | % | ±% |
|---|---|---|---|---|
| Labor | Carlo Lazzarini | 13,734 | 68.4 | |
| Liberal | Basil Mottershead | 6,347 | 31.6 | |
| Total formal votes | | 20,081 | 98.6 | |
| Informal votes | | 289 | 1.4 | |
| Turnout | | 20,370 | 93.1 | |
| Labor hold | | Swing | | |

=== Elections in the 1940s ===
==== 1947 ====
1947 New South Wales state election: Marrickville
| Party | Candidate | Votes | % | ±% |
|---|---|---|---|---|
| Labor | Carlo Lazzarini | 15,744 | 71.4 | −28.6 |
| Independent | William McCristal | 6,322 | 28.6 | +28.6 |
| Total formal votes | | 22,066 | 95.0 | |
| Informal votes | | 1,159 | 5.0 | |
| Turnout | | 23,225 | 95.0 | |
| Labor hold | | Swing | N/A | |

==== 1944 ====
1944 New South Wales state election: Marrickville
| Party | Candidate | Votes | % | ±% |
|---|---|---|---|---|
| Labor | Carlo Lazzarini | unopposed | | |
| Labor hold | | | | |

==== 1941 ====
1941 New South Wales state election: Marrickville
| Party | Candidate | Votes | % | ±% |
|---|---|---|---|---|
| Labor | Carlo Lazzarini | unopposed | | |
| Member changed to Labor from Industrial Labor | | | | |

=== Elections in the 1930s ===
==== 1938 ====
1938 New South Wales state election: Marrickville
| Party | Candidate | Votes | % | ±% |
|---|---|---|---|---|
| Industrial Labor | Carlo Lazzarini | 7,006 | 39.2 | +39.2 |
| United Australia | Frederick Rushton | 6,365 | 35.6 | −9.2 |
| Labor | Leslie Balzen | 4,496 | 25.2 | −30.0 |
| Total formal votes | | 17,867 | 98.7 | −0.1 |
| Informal votes | | 235 | 1.3 | +0.1 |
| Turnout | | 18,102 | 97.4 | −0.1 |
Two-party-preferred result
| Industrial Labor | Carlo Lazzarini | 10,960 | 61.3 | +61.3 |
| United Australia | Frederick Rushton | 6,907 | 38.7 | −6.1 |
| Member changed to Industrial Labor from Labor | | Swing | N/A | |

==== 1935 ====
1935 New South Wales state election: Marrickville
| Party | Candidate | Votes | % | ±% |
|---|---|---|---|---|
| Labor (NSW) | Carlo Lazzarini | 9,948 | 55.2 | +7.8 |
| United Australia | Herbert Donald | 8,063 | 44.8 | +3.8 |
| Total formal votes | | 18,011 | 98.8 | +1.0 |
| Informal votes | | 218 | 1.2 | −1.0 |
| Turnout | | 18,229 | 97.5 | +0.3 |
| Labor (NSW) hold | | Swing | +3.9 | |

==== 1932 ====
1932 New South Wales state election: Marrickville
| Party | Candidate | Votes | % | ±% |
|---|---|---|---|---|
| Labor (NSW) | Carlo Lazzarini | 8,422 | 47.4 | −18.5 |
| United Australia | Herbert Donald | 7,300 | 41.0 | +13.1 |
| Federal Labor | Thomas Melody | 984 | 5.5 | +5.5 |
| Ind. United Australia | Frank Wright | 941 | 5.3 | +5.3 |
| Communist | John Loughran | 136 | 0.8 | +0.3 |
| Total formal votes | | 17,783 | 97.8 | −0.3 |
| Informal votes | | 408 | 2.2 | +0.3 |
| Turnout | | 18,191 | 97.2 | +3.4 |
Two-party-preferred result
| Labor (NSW) | Carlo Lazzarini | 9,125 | 51.3 | |
| United Australia | Herbert Donald | 8,658 | 48.7 | |
| Labor (NSW) hold | | Swing | N/A | |

==== 1930 ====
1930 New South Wales state election: Marrickville
| Party | Candidate | Votes | % | ±% |
|---|---|---|---|---|
| Labor | Carlo Lazzarini | 11,508 | 65.9 | |
| Nationalist | Frederick Rushton | 4,873 | 27.9 | |
| Australian | Frank Wright | 988 | 5.7 | |
| Communist | Francis Wilson | 89 | 0.5 | |
| Total formal votes | | 17,458 | 98.1 | |
| Informal votes | | 332 | 1.9 | |
| Turnout | | 17,790 | 93.8 | |
| Labor hold | | Swing | | |

=== Elections in the 1920s ===
==== 1927 ====
1927 New South Wales state election: Marrickville
| Party | Candidate | Votes | % | ±% |
|---|---|---|---|---|
| Labor | Carlo Lazzarini | 8,325 | 62.5 | |
| Nationalist | Percy Mansell | 5,002 | 37.5 | |
| Total formal votes | | 13,327 | 99.1 | |
| Informal votes | | 122 | 0.9 | |
| Turnout | | 13,449 | 87.1 | |
| Labor win | | (new seat) | | |

District re-created

==== 1920 - 1927 ====
District abolished District abolished

=== Elections in the 1910s ===
==== 1917 ====
1917 New South Wales state election: Marrickville
| Party | Candidate | Votes | % | ±% |
|---|---|---|---|---|
| Labor | Carlo Lazzarini | 4,085 | 51.3 | −10.1 |
| Nationalist | Thomas Crawford | 3,565 | 44.8 | +8.8 |
| Independent | Frederick Hodges | 295 | 3.7 | +3.7 |
| Independent | Tedbar Barden | 15 | 0.2 | +0.2 |
| Total formal votes | | 7,960 | 99.1 | +1.1 |
| Informal votes | | 72 | 0.9 | −1.1 |
| Turnout | | 8,032 | 61.0 | −4.7 |
| Labor hold | | Swing | −10.1 | |

The sitting member Thomas Crawford was expelled from Labor in the November 1916 Labor split over conscription.

==== 1913 ====
1913 New South Wales state election: Marrickville
| Party | Candidate | Votes | % | ±% |
|---|---|---|---|---|
| Labor | Thomas Crawford | 4,911 | 61.4 | |
| Liberal Reform | William Wallace | 2,877 | 36.0 | |
| National Progressive | Samuel Davidson | 206 | 2.6 | |
| Total formal votes | | 7,994 | 98.0 | |
| Informal votes | | 162 | 2.0 | |
| Turnout | | 8,156 | 65.7 | |
| Labor hold | | | | |

==== 1910 ====
1910 New South Wales state election: Marrickville
| Party | Candidate | Votes | % | ±% |
|---|---|---|---|---|
| Labour | Thomas Crawford | 4,720 | 52.2 | +16.7 |
| Liberal Reform | Rupert McCoy | 3,730 | 41.2 | −23.4 |
| Independent Liberal | Arthur Blackwood | 577 | 6.4 | |
| Independent | Tedbar Barden | 17 | 0.2 | |
| Total formal votes | | 9,044 | 98.6 | +0.6 |
| Informal votes | | 132 | 1.4 | −0.6 |
| Turnout | | 9,176 | 75.1 | +8.4 |
| Labour gain from Liberal Reform | | | | |

=== Elections in the 1900s ===
==== 1907 ====
1907 New South Wales state election: Marrickville
| Party | Candidate | Votes | % | ±% |
|---|---|---|---|---|
| Liberal Reform | Richard McCoy | 3,966 | 64.6 | |
| Labour | Walter Thompson | 2,178 | 35.5 | |
| Total formal votes | | 6,144 | 98.0 | |
| Informal votes | | 128 | 2.0 | |
| Turnout | | 6,272 | 66.7 | |
| Liberal Reform hold | | | | |

==== 1904 ====
1904 New South Wales state election: Marrickville
| Party | Candidate | Votes | % | ±% |
|---|---|---|---|---|
| Liberal Reform | Richard McCoy | 2,784 | 73.4 | |
| Labour | Patrick MacManus | 1,011 | 26.6 | |
| Total formal votes | | 3,795 | 97.4 | |
| Informal votes | | 102 | 2.6 | |
| Turnout | | 3,897 | 49.1 | |
| Liberal Reform hold | | | | |

Marrickville lost part of the district to Canterbury and Petersham and was expanded to include part of the abolished seat of Newtown-St Peters. The member for Marrickville was Richard McCoy (Liberal Reform). The member for Newtown-St Peters was James Fallick (Independent Liberal) who successfully contested Singleton as an official Liberal Reform candidate.

==== 1901 ====
1901 New South Wales state election: Marrickville
| Party | Candidate | Votes | % | ±% |
|---|---|---|---|---|
| Liberal Reform | Richard McCoy | 1,214 | 44.2 | −11.4 |
| Independent Liberal | David Chenhall | 806 | 29.3 | −5.6 |
| Independent Liberal | William Moyes | 341 | 12.4 | +12.4 |
| Independent Liberal | George Leslie | 125 | 4.6 | +4.6 |
| Independent Liberal | George Morehouse | 125 | 4.6 | +4.6 |
| Progressive | James Edwards | 109 | 4.0 | |
| Independent | John Hardy | 28 | 1.02 | |
| Total formal votes | | 2,748 | 99.5 | −0.2 |
| Informal votes | | 14 | 0.5 | +0.2 |
| Turnout | | 2,762 | 66.2 | +1.6 |
| Liberal Reform hold | | | | |

The sitting member was Francis McLean (Liberal Reform) who did not contest the election as he had been elected in March 1901 to the federal seat of Lang which included Marrickville.

=== Elections in the 1890s ===
==== 1898 ====
1898 New South Wales colonial election: Marrickville
| Party | Candidate | Votes | % | ±% |
|---|---|---|---|---|
| Free Trade | Francis McLean | 1,258 | 55.6 | |
| National Federal | David Chenhall | 791 | 34.9 | |
| Ind. Free Trade | Elliot Johnson | 153 | 6.8 | |
| Independent Federalist | William Clarke | 53 | 2.3 | |
| Independent | William Webster | 9 | 0.4 | |
| Total formal votes | | 2,264 | 99.7 | |
| Informal votes | | 8 | 0.4 | |
| Turnout | | 2,272 | 64.6 | |
| Free Trade hold | | | | |

==== 1895 ====
1895 New South Wales colonial election: Marrickville
| Party | Candidate | Votes | % | ±% |
|---|---|---|---|---|
| Free Trade | Francis McLean | 1,159 | 70.7 | |
| Protectionist | Thomas Jones | 313 | 19.1 | |
| Ind. Free Trade | James Eve | 167 | 10.2 | |
| Total formal votes | | 1,639 | 99.5 | |
| Informal votes | | 9 | 0.6 | |
| Turnout | | 1,648 | 57.6 | |
| Free Trade hold | | | | |

==== 1894 ====
1894 New South Wales colonial election: Marrickville
| Party | Candidate | Votes | % | ±% |
|---|---|---|---|---|
| Free Trade | Francis McLean | 1,115 | 47.1 | |
| Labour | Elliot Johnson | 622 | 26.2 | |
| Protectionist | Daniel Gallagher | 274 | 11.6 | |
| Ind. Free Trade | Alexander Scouller | 194 | 8.2 | |
| Ind. Free Trade | Augustus Gross | 99 | 4.2 | |
| Ind. Free Trade | George Leslie | 42 | 1.8 | |
| Ind. Protectionist | Andrew Macauley | 24 | 1.0 | |
| Total formal votes | | 2,370 | 98.3 | |
| Informal votes | | 41 | 1.7 | |
| Turnout | | 2,411 | 82.5 | |
| Free Trade win | | (new seat) | | |

Marrickville was one of four new seats split out of the abolished seat of Newtown, the others being Newtown-Camperdown, Newtown-Erskine and Newtown-St Peters. The four sitting members for members for Newtown contested the other three seats.
