= Electoral results for the Division of Lang =

Australian division election results

This is a list of electoral results for the Division of Lang in Australian federal elections from the division's creation in 1901 until its abolition in 1977.

== Members ==
Member	Party	Term
Francis McLean	Free Trade	1901–1903
(Sir) Elliot Johnson	Free Trade, Anti-Socialist	1903–1909
(Sir) Elliot Johnson	Liberal	1909–1917
(Sir) Elliot Johnson	Nationalist	1917–1928
William Long	Labor	1928–1931
Dick Dein	United Australia	1931–1934
Dan Mulcahy	Labor (NSW)	1934–1936
Dan Mulcahy	Labor	1936–1940
Dan Mulcahy	Labor (N-C)	1940–1941
Dan Mulcahy	Labor	1941–1953
Frank Stewart	Labor	1953–1977

== Election results ==
=== Elections in the 1970s ===
==== 1975 ====
1975 Australian federal election: Lang
Party	Candidate	Votes	%	±%
Labor	Frank Stewart	31,960	55.1	−9.6
Liberal	Donald Carruthers	22,793	39.3	+8.5
Independent	Douglas Morgan	1,402	2.4	+2.4
Independent	Marc Aussie-Stone	960	1.7	+1.7
Independent	John Stewart	871	1.5	+1.5
Total formal votes		57,986	97.5	
Informal votes		1,477	2.5	
Turnout		59,463	94.5	
Two-party-preferred result
Labor	Frank Stewart		57.4	−9.3
Liberal	Donald Carruthers		42.6	+9.3
Labor hold		Swing	−9.3	

==== 1974 ====
1974 Australian federal election: Lang
Party	Candidate	Votes	%	±%
Labor	Frank Stewart	37,343	64.7	+0.9
Liberal	Barry Peffer	17,795	30.8	−1.2
Australia	George Edgell	2,558	4.4	+4.4
Total formal votes		57,696	98.1	
Informal votes		1,136	1.9	
Turnout		58,832	92.8	
Two-party-preferred result
Labor	Frank Stewart		66.7	+2.3
Liberal	Barry Peffer		32.3	−2.3
Labor hold		Swing	+2.3	

==== 1972 ====
1972 Australian federal election: Lang
Party	Candidate	Votes	%	±%
Labor	Frank Stewart	33,274	63.8	+5.4
Liberal	Stanley Duncan	16,700	32.0	−1.6
Democratic Labor	Robert Burke	2,167	4.2	+0.8
Total formal votes		52,141	98.1	
Informal votes		1,006	1.9	
Turnout		53,147	94.7	
Two-party-preferred result
Labor	Frank Stewart		64.4	+2.7
Liberal	Stanley Duncan		33.6	−2.7
Labor hold		Swing	+2.7	

=== Elections in the 1960s ===
==== 1969 ====
1969 Australian federal election: Lang
Party	Candidate	Votes	%	±%
Labor	Frank Stewart	29,748	58.4	+7.5
Liberal	Stanley Duncan	17,144	33.6	−10.0
Democratic Labor	Dominique Droulers	1,754	3.4	−2.1
Independent	Bert Tripet	1,617	3.2	+3.2
Communist	Jack Mundey	696	1.4	+1.4
Total formal votes		50,959	97.3	
Informal votes		1,414	2.7	
Turnout		52,373	94.8	
Two-party-preferred result
Labor	Frank Stewart		61.7	+9.9
Liberal	Stanley Duncan		38.3	−9.9
Labor hold		Swing	+9.9	

==== 1966 ====
1966 Australian federal election: Lang
Party	Candidate	Votes	%	±%
Labor	Frank Stewart	22,417	50.6	−6.6
Liberal	Graham Crawford	19,432	43.9	+4.8
Democratic Labor	Bernard Atkinson	2,450	5.5	+5.5
Total formal votes		44,299	97.0	
Informal votes		1,361	3.0	
Turnout		45,660	95.0	
Two-party-preferred result
Labor	Frank Stewart		51.5	−5.3
Liberal	Graham Crawford		48.5	+5.3
Labor hold		Swing	−5.3	

==== 1963 ====
1963 Australian federal election: Lang
Party	Candidate	Votes	%	±%
Labor	Frank Stewart	25,182	57.2	−6.8
Liberal	Russell Carter	17,208	39.1	+10.3
Independent	Frank Ball	1,626	3.7	+3.7
Total formal votes		44,016	98.5	
Informal votes		671	1.5	
Turnout		44,687	95.6	
Two-party-preferred result
Labor	Frank Stewart		58.6	−7.7
Liberal	Russell Carter		41.4	+7.7
Labor hold		Swing	−7.7	

==== 1961 ====
1961 Australian federal election: Lang
Party	Candidate	Votes	%	±%
Labor	Frank Stewart	28,379	64.0	+3.4
Liberal	Russell Carter	12,775	28.8	−6.2
Independent	Frank Ball	2,043	4.6	+4.6
Democratic Labor	Edward Byrnes	1,162	2.6	−1.8
Total formal votes		44,359	97.3	
Informal votes		1,228	2.7	
Turnout		45,587	95.4	
Two-party-preferred result
Labor	Frank Stewart		66.3	+4.8
Liberal	Russell Carter		32.7	−4.8
Labor hold		Swing	+4.8	

=== Elections in the 1950s ===
==== 1958 ====
1958 Australian federal election: Lang
Party	Candidate	Votes	%	±%
Labor	Frank Stewart	26,915	60.6	+0.3
Liberal	Hugh Bygott	15,539	35.0	−4.7
Democratic Labor	Kevin Davis	1,944	4.4	+4.4
Total formal votes		44,398	97.1	
Informal votes		1,321	2.9	
Turnout		45,719	96.0	
Two-party-preferred result
Labor	Frank Stewart		61.5	+1.2
Liberal	Hugh Bygott		38.5	−1.2
Labor hold		Swing	+1.2	

==== 1955 ====
1955 Australian federal election: Lang
Party	Candidate	Votes	%	±%
Labor	Frank Stewart	25,175	60.3	−2.8
Liberal	Wallace Peacock	16,550	39.7	+5.9
Total formal votes		41,725	96.9	
Informal votes		1,341	3.1	
Turnout		43,066	95.5	
Labor hold		Swing	−5.5	

==== 1954 ====
1954 Australian federal election: Lang
Party	Candidate	Votes	%	±%
Labor	Frank Stewart	23,472	54.6	+4.6
Liberal	John Spicer	19,509	45.4	+0.1
Total formal votes		42,981	98.9	
Informal votes		487	1.1	
Turnout		43,468	96.8	
Labor hold		Swing	+1.4	

==== 1953 by-election ====
1953 Lang by-election
Party	Candidate	Votes	%	±%
Labor	Frank Stewart	21,699	53.9	+3.9
Liberal	Herbert Thorncraft	17,218	42.8	−2.5
Communist	Roy Boyd	1,082	2.7	−2.0
Democratic	Thomas Brosnan (disendorsed)	275	0.7	+0.7
Total formal votes		40,274	98.6	
Informal votes		584	1.4	
Turnout		40,858	91.0	
Two-party-preferred result
Labor	Frank Stewart		56.7	+3.5
Liberal	Herbert Thorncraft		43.3	−3.5
Labor hold		Swing	+3.5	

==== 1951 ====
1951 Australian federal election: Lang
Party	Candidate	Votes	%	±%
Labor	Dan Mulcahy	20,944	50.0	−0.2
Liberal	Robert Bruce	18,951	45.3	+0.2
Communist	Roy Boyd	1,968	4.7	+0.0
Total formal votes		41,863	98.3	
Informal votes		721	1.7	
Turnout		42,584	97.4	
Two-party-preferred result
Labor	Dan Mulcahy		53.2	−1.5
Liberal	Robert Bruce		46.8	+1.5
Labor hold		Swing	−1.5	

=== Elections in the 1940s ===
==== 1949 ====
1949 Australian federal election: Lang
Party	Candidate	Votes	%	±%
Labor	Dan Mulcahy	20,421	50.2	+0.3
Liberal	Eric Willis	18,369	45.1	+9.1
Communist	Roy Boyd	1,905	4.7	−2.8
Total formal votes		40,695	98.0	
Informal votes		827	2.0	
Turnout		41,522	97.9	
Two-party-preferred result
Labor	Dan Mulcahy		54.7	−6.4
Liberal	Eric Willis		45.3	+6.4
Labor hold		Swing	−6.4	

==== 1946 ====
1946 Australian federal election: Lang
Party	Candidate	Votes	%	±%
Labor	Dan Mulcahy	37,918	51.7	−9.8
Liberal	John Paget	24,963	34.0	+9.4
Communist	Adam Ogston	5,508	7.5	+1.1
Lang Labor	Sidney Bell	4,995	6.8	+6.8
Total formal votes		73,384	97.7	
Informal votes		1,708	2.3	
Turnout		75,092	96.7	
Two-party-preferred result
Labor	Dan Mulcahy		64.6	−6.4
Liberal	John Paget		35.4	+6.4
Labor hold		Swing	−6.4	

==== 1943 ====
1943 Australian federal election: Lang
Party	Candidate	Votes	%	±%
Labor	Dan Mulcahy	41,701	61.5	+41.2
United Australia	William Harris	16,649	24.6	−11.0
Communist	Adam Ogston	4,312	6.4	+6.4
Independent	John Metcalfe	3,899	5.7	+5.7
Independent	Henry Mulcahy	1,249	1.8	+1.8
Total formal votes		67,810	97.3	
Informal votes		1,881	2.7	
Turnout		69,691	97.7	
Two-party-preferred result
Labor	Dan Mulcahy		71.0	+71.0
United Australia	William Harris		29.0	−5.0
Labor gain from Labor (N-C)		Swing	+5.0	

==== 1940 ====
1940 Australian federal election: Lang
Party	Candidate	Votes	%	±%
Labor (N-C)	Dan Mulcahy	23,298	38.0	+38.0
United Australia	Bertram Stevens	15,615	25.4	−9.7
Labor	John Metcalfe	12,487	20.3	−30.1
United Australia	Matthew Calman	5,626	9.2	+9.2
State Labor	Arthur Robinson	3,738	6.1	+6.1
United Australia	Stanley Willmott	608	1.0	+1.0
Total formal votes		61,372	96.7	
Informal votes		2,064	3.3	
Turnout		63,436	97.4	
Two-party-preferred result
Labor (N-C)	Dan Mulcahy	40,517	66.0	+66.0
United Australia	Bertram Stevens	20,855	34.0	−13.4
Labor (N-C) gain from Labor		Swing	+13.4	

=== Elections in the 1930s ===
==== 1937 ====
1937 Australian federal election: Lang
Party	Candidate	Votes	%	±%
Labor	Dan Mulcahy	28,379	50.4	+43.3
United Australia	Matthew Calman	25,547	45.3	+7.4
Social Credit	Ernest Carr	2,435	4.3	−6.7
Total formal votes		56,361	97.5	
Informal votes		1,437	2.5	
Turnout		57,798	97.5	
Two-party-preferred result
Labor	Dan Mulcahy		52.6	+52.6
United Australia	Matthew Calman		47.4	+4.5
Labor gain from Labor (NSW)		Swing	−4.5	

==== 1934 ====
1934 Australian federal election: Lang
Party	Candidate	Votes	%	±%
Labor (NSW)	Dan Mulcahy	21,398	41.4	+6.0
United Australia	Charles Robinson	19,623	37.9	−5.3
Social Credit	Colin Barclay-Smith	5,687	11.0	+11.0
Labor	Allan Howie	3,667	7.1	−14.3
Independent	Rufus Naylor	1,347	2.6	+2.6
Total formal votes		51,722	95.2	
Informal votes		2,597	4.8	
Turnout		54,319	96.1	
Two-party-preferred result
Labor (NSW)	Dan Mulcahy	29,546	57.1	−6.8
United Australia	Charles Robinson	22,176	42.9	+6.8
Labor (NSW) hold		Swing	−6.8	

==== 1931 ====
1931 Australian federal election: Lang
Party	Candidate	Votes	%	±%
Labor (NSW)	Dan Mulcahy	13,249	30.7	+30.7
United Australia	Dick Dein	12,858	29.8	+15.5
Labor	William Long	8,669	20.1	−46.1
United Australia	Alfred Bennett	8,439	19.5	+19.5
Total formal votes		43,215	97.0	
Informal votes		1,355	3.0	
Turnout		44,570	94.9	
Two-party-preferred result
United Australia	Dick Dein	23,404	54.2	+20.4
Labor (NSW)	Dan Mulcahy	19,811	45.8	+45.8
United Australia gain from Labor		Swing	+20.4	

=== Elections in the 1920s ===
==== 1929 ====
1929 Australian federal election: Lang
Party	Candidate	Votes	%	±%
Labor	William Long	28,898	66.2	+12.7
Nationalist	Dick Dein	14,736	33.8	−12.7
Total formal votes		43,634	97.4	
Informal votes		1,150	2.6	
Turnout		44,784	94.3	
Labor hold		Swing	+12.7	

==== 1928 ====
1928 Australian federal election: Lang
Party	Candidate	Votes	%	±%
Labor	William Long	21,918	53.5	+9.4
Nationalist	Sir Elliot Johnson	19,082	46.5	−9.4
Total formal votes		41,000	94.7	
Informal votes		2,314	5.3	
Turnout		43,314	92.9	
Labor gain from Nationalist		Swing	+9.4	

==== 1925 ====
1925 Australian federal election: Lang
Party	Candidate	Votes	%	±%
Nationalist	Sir Elliot Johnson	22,756	55.9	+6.6
Labor	George Smith	17,941	44.1	+2.4
Total formal votes		40,697	98.5	
Informal votes		524	1.5	
Turnout		41,321	85.7	
Nationalist hold		Swing	+1.5	

==== 1922 ====
1922 Australian federal election: Lang
Party	Candidate	Votes	%	±%
Nationalist	Sir Elliot Johnson	10,786	49.3	−9.3
Labor	George Smith	9,117	41.7	+0.6
Majority Labor	Percy Evans	1,974	9.0	+9.0
Total formal votes		21,877	95.7	
Informal votes		992	4.3	
Turnout		22,869	53.8	
Two-party-preferred result
Nationalist	Sir Elliot Johnson	11,911	54.4	−4.3
Labor	George Smith	9,966	45.6	+4.3
Nationalist hold		Swing	−4.3	

=== Elections in the 1910s ===
==== 1919 ====
1919 Australian federal election: Lang
Party	Candidate	Votes	%	±%
Nationalist	Elliot Johnson	18,939	57.3	−3.1
Labor	Archibald Moate	14,105	42.7	+3.1
Total formal votes		33,044	98.5	
Informal votes		515	1.5	
Turnout		33,559	67.6	
Nationalist hold		Swing	−3.1	

==== 1917 ====
1917 Australian federal election: Lang
Party	Candidate	Votes	%	±%
Nationalist	Elliot Johnson	21,495	60.4	+6.9
Labor	Percy Evans	14,081	39.6	−6.9
Total formal votes		35,576	97.8	
Informal votes		1,030	2.8	
Turnout		36,606	72.7	
Nationalist hold		Swing	+6.9	

==== 1914 ====
1914 Australian federal election: Lang
Party	Candidate	Votes	%	±%
Liberal	Elliot Johnson	16,556	53.5	−3.6
Labor	Hector Lamond	14,391	46.5	+3.6
Total formal votes		30,947	98.0	
Informal votes		639	2.0	
Turnout		31,586	64.2	
Liberal hold		Swing	−3.6	

==== 1913 ====
1913 Australian federal election: Lang
Party	Candidate	Votes	%	±%
Liberal	Elliot Johnson	18,293	57.1	+4.7
Labor	Hector Lamond	13,714	42.9	−4.7
Total formal votes		32,007	97.0	
Informal votes		1,002	3.0	
Turnout		33,009	74.0	
Liberal hold		Swing	+4.7	

==== 1910 ====
1910 Australian federal election: Lang
Party	Candidate	Votes	%	±%
Liberal	Elliot Johnson	12,921	51.0	−19.4
Labour	Thomas Crawford	12,402	49.0	+19.4
Total formal votes		25,325	98.9	
Informal votes		285	1.1	
Turnout		25,608	68.4	
Liberal hold		Swing	−19.4	

=== Elections in the 1900s ===
==== 1906 ====
1906 Australian federal election: Lang
Party	Candidate	Votes	%	±%
Anti-Socialist	Elliot Johnson	11,138	70.4	+19.7
Labour	Edward Bennetts	4,677	29.6	+11.2
Total formal votes		15,815	97.2	
Informal votes		458	2.8	
Turnout		16,273	56.3	
Anti-Socialist hold		Swing	+9.2	

==== 1903 ====
1903 Australian federal election: Lang
Party	Candidate	Votes	%	±%
Free Trade	Elliot Johnson	10,527	50.7	−34.8
Ind. Free Trade	William Cullam	5,552	26.7	+26.7
Labour	Tom Keegan	3,042	18.4	+8.4
Protectionist	Thomas Roseby	1,642	7.9	−10.1
Total formal votes		20,763	97.2	
Informal votes		599	2.8	
Turnout		21,362	54.9	
Free Trade hold		Swing	−16.3	

==== 1901 ====
1901 Australian federal election: Lang
Party	Candidate	Votes	%	±%
Free Trade	Francis McLean	7,449	74.5	+74.5
Protectionist	James Edwards	1,801	18.0	+18.0
Labour	James Watson	632	6.3	+6.3
Ind. Protectionist	James Mitchell	111	1.1	+1.1
Total formal votes		9,993	97.2	
Informal votes		292	2.8	
Turnout		10,285	85.7	
Free Trade win		(new seat)		
