= National Health and Medical Research Council =

Australian government agency

Council overview
- Formed: 1936; 90 years ago
- Preceding Council: Federal Health Council (1926–36)
- Jurisdiction: Australian Government
- Headquarters: Canberra
- Motto: Building a Healthy Australia
- Employees: 233 (2022–23)
- Annual budget: A$1.18 billion (2022–23)
- Minister responsible: Mark Butler, Minister for Health and Aged Care
- Council executive: Steve Wesselingh, CEO
- Parent department: Department of Health and Aged Care
- Website: nhmrc.gov.au

The National Health and Medical Research Council (NHMRC) is the main statutory authority of the Australian Government responsible for medical research. It was the eighth largest research funding body in the world in 2016, and NHMRC-funded research is globally recognised for its high quality. Around 45% of all Australian medical research from 2008–12 was funded by the federal government, through the NHMRC.

As an independent arm of the Department of Health, the NHMRC funds high quality health and medical research, builds research capability in Australia, support the translation of health and medical research into better health outcomes, and promote the ethics and integrity in research. Non-health research is funded by the Australian Research Council.

== Activities ==
The National Health and Medical Research Council Act 1992 provides for NHMRC to pursue activities designed to:

- raise the standard of individual and public health throughout Australia
- foster the development of consistent health standards between the various States and Territories
- foster medical research and training and public health research and training throughout Australia
- foster consideration of ethical issues relating to health.

=== Investment ===
NHMRC invests in health and medical research through its grant program. Funding received for health and medical research from the Australian Government and other sources through the Medical Research Endowment Account (MREA) amounted to $882.7 million in 2018–19. This amount was exclusive of NHMRC's administrative costs, which are funded separately to the MREA.

The funds invested by NHMRC are drawn from its Medical Research Endowment Account and from separate accounts established to hold philanthropic gifts and bequests.

=== Translation ===
One of NHMRC's primary responsibilities is supporting the effective and rapid translation of research findings into health policy and practice. Specific activities undertaken by NHMRC to support research translation include:

== Organisation and leadership ==
NHMRC is, formally, a council consisting of the Commonwealth, state and territory chief medical officers, as well as persons with expertise in a variety of areas including:

- public health
- public health research and medical research issues
- ethics relating to research involving humans and animals
- the health needs of Aboriginal persons and Torres Strait Islanders
- public involvement and consumer and community issues (such as consumer and community involvement in clinical trials)
- business
- health care training
- professional medical standards
- the medical profession and post‑graduate medical training
- the nursing profession.

This Council advises the chief executive officer (CEO) and is supported by the Office of NHMRC.

=== Committees ===
Section 35 of the NHMRC Act 1992 allows the Minister for Health to establish Principal Committees to assist the council to carry out any of its functions.

Section 39 of the Act enables the CEO to establish working committees to help carry out the functions of the CEO, the council or a Principal Committee. Peer Review Panels are the most common type of working committee established by the CEO.

== History ==
In May 1923, the Australian Government called a Premiers' Conference "to devise measures for the co-operation of the Commonwealth and the States and of States with States and to provide uniformity of legislation and administration on health matters". By agreement at the Conference, a Royal Commission on health was appointed in 1925.

The report of the commission (the Hone Report) recommended the constitution of a Federal Health Council as an advisory body which should meet at least annually for the purpose of reviewing co-operation between Commonwealth and State health authorities.

The Report also recommended that the Commonwealth should provide a fund in aid of research on health questions, and establish a Council to administer it.

In response to these recommendations, a Federal Health Council was established by the Governor-General (by Order-in-Council) in 1926. The secretariat to the council was provided by the Australian Government Department of Health, which was itself established in 1921.

The first meeting of the council was held on the 25 January 1927.

At its ninth session, in April 1936, the Council proposed a revision of its functions, and the Commonwealth responded to this recommendation, together with the previous proposals on research made by the Royal Commission on Health. In September 1936, a revised Order-in-Council created a National Health and Medical Research Council to replace the Federal Health Council.

In addition to its previous role advising the Commonwealth and states (but not territories, as these did not exist at that time) on public health questions, NHMRC was also able to provide advice on medical research, including advice to the Commonwealth on the expenditure of money on medical research. To support this latter activity, the Medical Research Endowment Act 1937 was passed. This Act established the Medical Research Endowment Fund to support medical research.

The National Health and Medical Research Council Act 1992 (NHMRC Act 1992), which came into effect on 24 June 1993, provided a legislative basis for NHMRC.

=== Reviews ===
In 1998, the Health and Medical Research Strategic Review committee, chaired by Mr Peter Wills AC, presented a report to the Australian Government (The Virtuous Cycle) which led to a significant increase in funding for the health and medical research sector through NHMRC.

Between 2000 and 2018, the number of NHMRC-funded grants – across all research grant schemes – increased from 1870 to 4241 active grants, and total expenditure from NHMRC's Medical Research Endowment Account increased from $170 million to $861 million: a fivefold increase in funding.

Following amendments to the NHMRC Act 1992, NHMRC became an independent statutory agency within the Health and Ageing portfolio on 1 July 2006.

The Strategic Review of Health and Medical Research in Australia (McKeon Review) was established by the Australian Government in late 2011, and the report of the Review was publicly released in April 2013. The Review recommended a 10-year strategic health and medical research plan for the nation and included recommendations relating to NHMRC.

=== Medical Research Future Fund (MRFF) ===
As part of the 2014–15 Budget the Government announced the establishment of the $20 billion Medical Research Future Fund (MRFF). The MRFF provides funding to address medical research priorities, drive innovation, improve delivery of health care, boost the effectiveness of the health system, and contribute to economic growth. It therefore complements and enhances funding for health and medical research provided by NHMRC.

NHMRC is assisting the Department of Health and Aged Care to implement disbursements from the MRFF as a provisional grants hub, along with the Business Grants Hub within the Australian Department of Industry, Science and Resources. This assistance draws on NHMRC's application and assessment processes and the expertise available to NHMRC through the health and medical research sector and other sources.

== Timeline ==
Year	Event
1921	Australian Government Department of Health is established
1923	Australian Government calls a Premiers' Conference on health matters
1925	Report of the Royal Commission on Health (the Hone Report) released
1926	Governor-General in Council establishes the Federal Health Council
1936	Governor-General in Council establishes NHMRC
1937	Medical Research Endowment Act 1937
1982	Review of NHMRC's functions, structure and operations (Coghland-Shea Review) report released
1984	Independent committee appointed to examine the organisation, functions and membership of NHMRC
1992	National Health and Medical Research Council Act 1992 enacted
1993	External Review of the NHMRC (Bienenstock Review) report released
1999	Strategic Review of Health and Medical Research (Wills Review) report released, recommending significant increase to funding for health and medical research
2000	NHMRC Act 1992 amended, creating the position of NHMRC Chief Executive Officer (CEO)
2005-06	NHMRC Act 1992 amended, establishing NHMRC as an independent statutory agency
2013	Strategic Review of Health and Medical Research in Australia (McKeon Review) report released, recommending changes to NHMRC
2018	NHMRC's New Grant Program commences operation
2019	NHMRC's new research grants management system (Sapphire) commences operation

== Governance ==
=== Chief executive officers ===
The CEO is the accountable authority of NHMRC. The role of CEO was established in 2000 through a change to the NHMRC Act 1992.

Tenure	CEO
2001-2005	Professor Alan Pettigrew
2006	Mr William Lawrence (a/g CEO)
2006-2015	Professor Warwick Anderson AM
2016-2023	Professor Anne Kelso AO
2023-Present	Professor Steve Wesselingh

=== Chairs ===
The functions of the council, led by the chair, are to provide advice to the CEO in relation to the performance of his or her functions.

Tenure	Chair
1927-45	Dr John Cumpston CMG
1946-59	Dr Arthur Metcalfe CBE
1960-72	Major General Sir William Refshauge, AC, CBE
1973-82	Dr Gwyn Howells CB
1983-84	Mr Lawrence Willett AO
1984-87	Mr Bernard McKay
1987	Mr AJ Ayers
1988-90	Professor John Chalmers AC
1991-93	Professor Diana Horvath AO
1994-96	Professor Richard Smallwood AO
1997-99	Professor Richard Larkins AC
2000-03	Professor Nick Saunders AO
2003-05	Professor John Shine AO
2006-12	Professor Michael Good AO
2012-15	The Hon Justice Annabelle Bennett AC
2015-21	Professor Bruce Robinson AC
2021-24	Professor Caroline Homer AO

=== Secretaries ===
Prior to the establishment of the role of CEO, a number of the CEO's functions were performed by the Secretary of the council.

Tenure	Secretary
1926-1936	Mr JL Fawcett
1936-1946	Mr JL Fawcett
1947	Mr J Barchard
1948-1949	Mr TE Moon
1954-57	Mr CC Clifford
1958	Mr SP Power
1958-62	Dr RE Richards
1962-67	Mr RHC Wells
1968-72	Dr RW Greville
1972-79	Dr KW Edmondson
1980-83	Dr D De Souza
1983-87	Dr RW Cumming
1987-88	Mr RE Wilson
1988-94	Mr J Loy
1994-95	Ms F Howarth
1996	Ms D Ariotti
1997-00	Mr R Wells
2001-02	Mrs J Campbell
2002-06	Mr L Bienkiewicz

== See also ==
- National Institutes of Health (NIH)
- Canadian Institutes of Health Research (CIHR)
- Medical Research Council (MRC)
- Australian Research Council (ARC)
