= Refshauge =

Refshauge is a surname. Notable people with the surname include:

- Andrew Refshauge (born 1949), Australian politician
- Joan Refshauge (1906–1979), Australian doctor and schoolteacher
- Richard Refshauge (born 1947), Australian lawyer and judge
- William Refshauge (1913–2009), Australian soldier and public administrator
