= 1983 Marrickville state by-election =

Election result for Marrickville, New South Wales, Australia

A by-election was held for the New South Wales Legislative Assembly seat of Marrickville on 22 October 1983. It was triggered by the death of Tom Cahill (Labor).

The Marrickville by-election was held the same day as the by-elections for Kogarah, Maroubra and Riverstone. All were safe Labor seats and while there was a swing against Labor in each seat (7.2% to 11.8%), all were retained by Labor.

== Dates ==
Date	Event
23 June 1983	Tom Cahill died.
23 September 1983	Writ of election issued by the Speaker of the Legislative Assembly and close of electoral rolls.
30 September 1983	Day of nomination
22 October 1983	Polling day
11 November 1983	Return of writ

== Result ==
1983 Marrickville by-election Saturday 22 October
Party	Candidate	Votes	%	±%
Labor	Andrew Refshauge	13,018	61.7	−9.6
Liberal	John Kekis	4,496	21.3	+2.0
Democrats	Rodney Dominish	2,311	11.0	+8.0
Socialist	David Gibson	1,072	5.1	−1.3
Independent	Nadar Ponnuswamy	216	1.0	
Total formal votes		21,113	95.6	
Informal votes		965	4.4	
Turnout		22,078	75.3	
Labor hold				

== See also ==
- Electoral results for the district of Marrickville
- List of New South Wales state by-elections
