= 2005 Marrickville state by-election =

Election result for Marrickville, New South Wales, Australia

A by-election was held in the State Electoral District of Marrickville in New South Wales, Australia on 17 September 2005. The by-election was prompted by the resignation of the sitting member Deputy Premier Andrew Refshauge (Labor) on 10 August 2005, in the wake of the resignation of Premier Bob Carr. The by-election was timed to coincide with two other state by-elections in Macquarie Fields and Maroubra.

The main contenders were the ALP's Carmel Tebbutt, who had been a member of the Legislative Council since 1998 and was the wife of Anthony Albanese, the member for the local federal electorate of Grayndler, and Greens candidate Sam Byrne, who at that time was the deputy mayor of Marrickville. The Liberal Party did not stand a candidate.

Nominations for the by-election closed on 2 September 2005.

== Results ==
Carmel Tebbutt was elected with 49.79% of the primary vote and 55.07% of the two-candidate preferred vote after preferences were distributed. However, this was a 5.63% swing to the Greens, and Sam Byrne's 38.96% primary vote was the highest for a Greens candidate in New South Wales electoral history.

2005 Marrickville by-election Saturday 17 September
| Party | Candidate | Votes | % | ±% |
|---|---|---|---|---|
| Labor | Carmel Tebbutt | 17,428 | 49.79 | +1.39 |
| Greens | Sam Byrne | 13,638 | 38.96 | +10.49 |
| Christian Democrats | Saidi Goldstein | 1,066 | 3.05 | +3.05 |
| Democrats | Michelle Bleicher | 977 | 2.79 | +0.28 |
| Socialist Alliance | Pip Hinman | 526 | 1.50 | −1.22 |
| Save Our Suburbs | Lorraine Thompson | 484 | 1.38 | +0.01 |
| Independent | Chris McLachlan | 397 | 1.13 | +1.13 |
| Independent | Malcolm Woodward | 344 | 0.98 | +0.98 |
| | Alasdair MacDonald | 144 | 0.41 | +0.41 |
| Total formal votes | | 35,004 | 97.32 | |
| Informal votes | | 1,012 | 2.68 | |
| Turnout | | 36,016 | 78.25 | |
Two-candidate-preferred result
| Labor | Carmel Tebbutt | 18,059 | 55.07 | −5.63 |
| Greens | Sam Byrne | 14,731 | 44.93 | +5.63 |
| Labor hold | | Swing | −5.63 | |

== See also ==
- Electoral results for the district of Marrickville
- List of New South Wales state by-elections
