= Medicine in Australia: Balancing Employment and Life =

Australian survey of physicians

Medicine in Australia: Balancing Employment and Life (MABEL) is a longitudinal (panel) survey of medical practitioners in Australia. The aim of the survey is to examine factors influencing doctors' decisions about working in a rural areas, career choices, and hours worked.

The first survey was conducted in 2008 (Wave 1), and it has been repeated each year. Though other longitudinal surveys have followed up cohorts of medical graduates, MABEL is unique in that in 2008 it followed up a cohort of doctors in clinical practice at all stages of their career, from intern (the first year after graduating from a medical degree) to those approaching retirement. In 2008, all doctors in clinical practice were invited to participate and close to 20% (10,528) of all doctors in Australia participated.

Each year an additional cohort of doctors new to clinical practice (e.g. new graduates and doctors from overseas) is invited, with around 10,000 responding, though this is falling slightly each year. De-identified data are made available to external users. The website includes a list of publications and research findings and a user manual that contains information on sampling and data.

The survey is led by Anthony Scott at the University of Melbourne, with co-investigators Matthew McGrail (2013–2016) from Monash University, Guyonne Kalb from the University of Melbourne, John Humphreys (2007–2013) from Monash University, and Catherine Joyce (2007–2014) from Monash University. Their main sources of funding were first, a grant from the National Health and Medical Research Council (NHMRC) Health Services Research Strategic Award from 2007 to 201, and then from the NHMRC Centre of Research Excellence scheme, which funded the NHMRC Centre of Research Excellence in Medical Workforce Dynamics from 2012 to 2016.

== Outputs ==
Many papers have been published to present the results of this survey. These include:

- Brown, Alison; Enticott, Joanne; Russell, Grant (1 September 2021). "How do Australian general practitioners spend their time? A cross-sectional analysis of Medicine in Australia: Balancing Employment and Life (MABEL) data examining 'non-billable workload'". Australian Journal of General Practice. 50 (9): 661–666. doi:10.31128/AJGP-09-20-5631. PMID 34462774.
- Cheng, Terence Chai; Scott, Anthony; Jeon, Sung-Hee; Kalb, Guyonne; Humphreys, John; Joyce, Catherine (November 2012). "What Factors Influence the Earnings of General Practitioners and Medical Specialists? Evidence from the Medicine in Australia: Balancing Employment and Life Survey". Health Economics. 21 (11): 1300–1317. doi:10.1002/hec.1791. hdl:11343/112382. PMID 21919116.
- Joyce, Catherine; Eyre, Harris; Wang, Wei Chun; Laurence, Caroline (4 November 2015). "Australian doctors' non-clinical activities: results from the Medicine in Australia: Balancing Employment and Life (MABEL) survey of doctors". Australian Health Review. 39 (5): 588–594. doi:10.1071/AH14223. PMID 25913632.
- Milner, Allison; Witt, Katrina; Spittal, Matthew J.; Bismark, Marie; Graham, Melissa; LaMontagne, Anthony D. (December 2017). "The relationship between working conditions and self-rated health among medical doctors: evidence from seven waves of the Medicine In Australia Balancing Employment and Life (Mabel) survey". BMC Health Services Research. 17 (1) 609. doi:10.1186/s12913-017-2554-z. PMC 5576303. PMID 28851354.
