= John Cumpston =

John Cumpston CMG
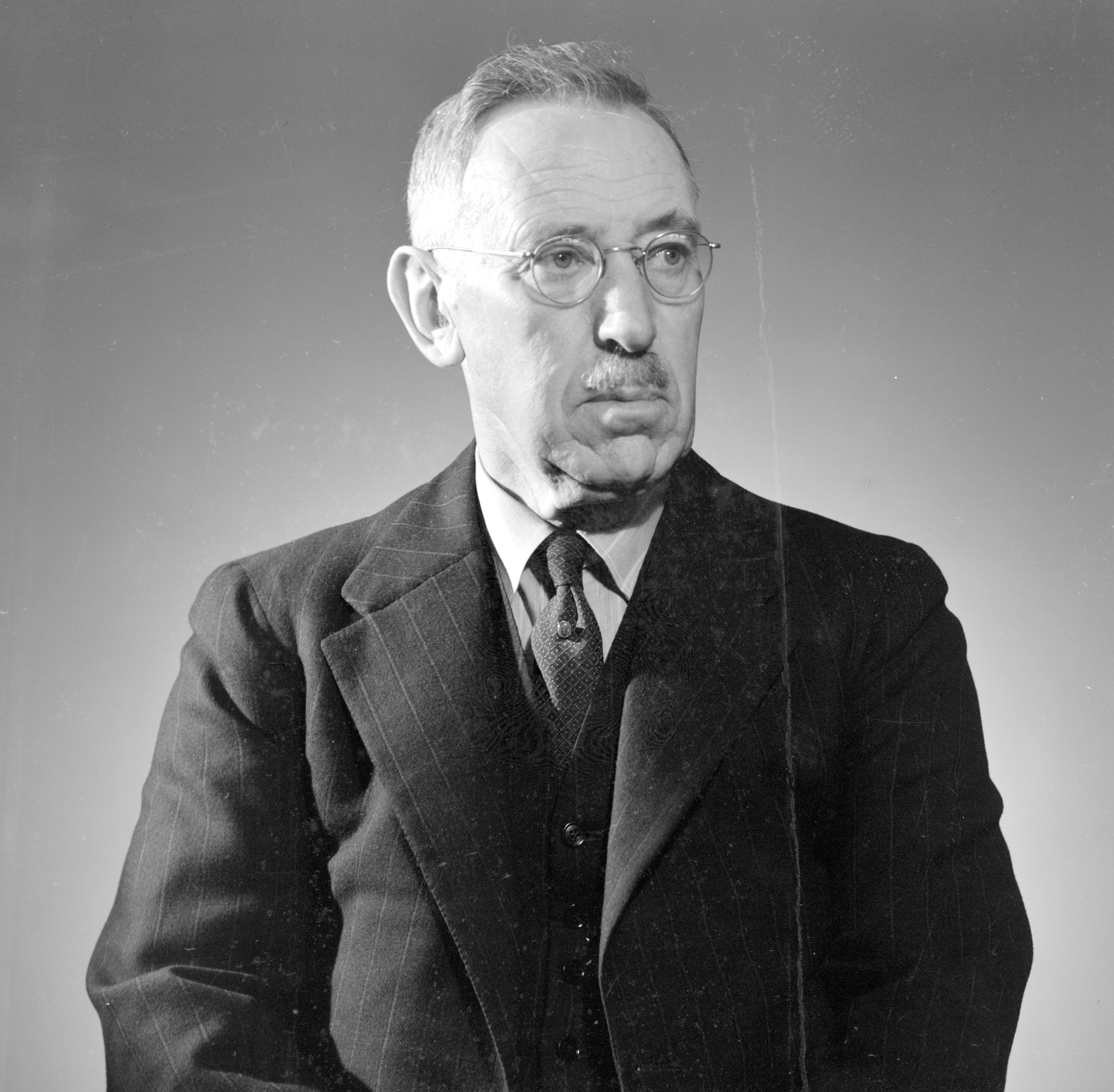
- Dr John Cumpston, Director, Sydney, c. 1950

Director-General of the Department of Health
- In office 1 March 1921 – 1 June 1945

Personal details
- Born: John Howard Lidgett Cumpston; 19 June 1880 South Yarra, Melbourne, Victoria, Australia
- Died: 9 October 1954 (aged 74) Forrest, Canberra, Australian Capital Territory, Australia
- Education: University of Melbourne
- Occupation: Public servant

John Howard Lidgett Cumpston CMG (19 June 1880 – 9 October 1954) was a senior Australian public servant, and first Director-General of the Department of Health.

== Life and career ==
John Cumpston was born in South Yarra, Melbourne on 19 June 1880, to parents Elizabeth Cumpston (née Newman) and George William Cumpston. He attended Wesley College and went on to study medicine at the University of Melbourne (1898–1902). His interests were in public health and preventative medicine.

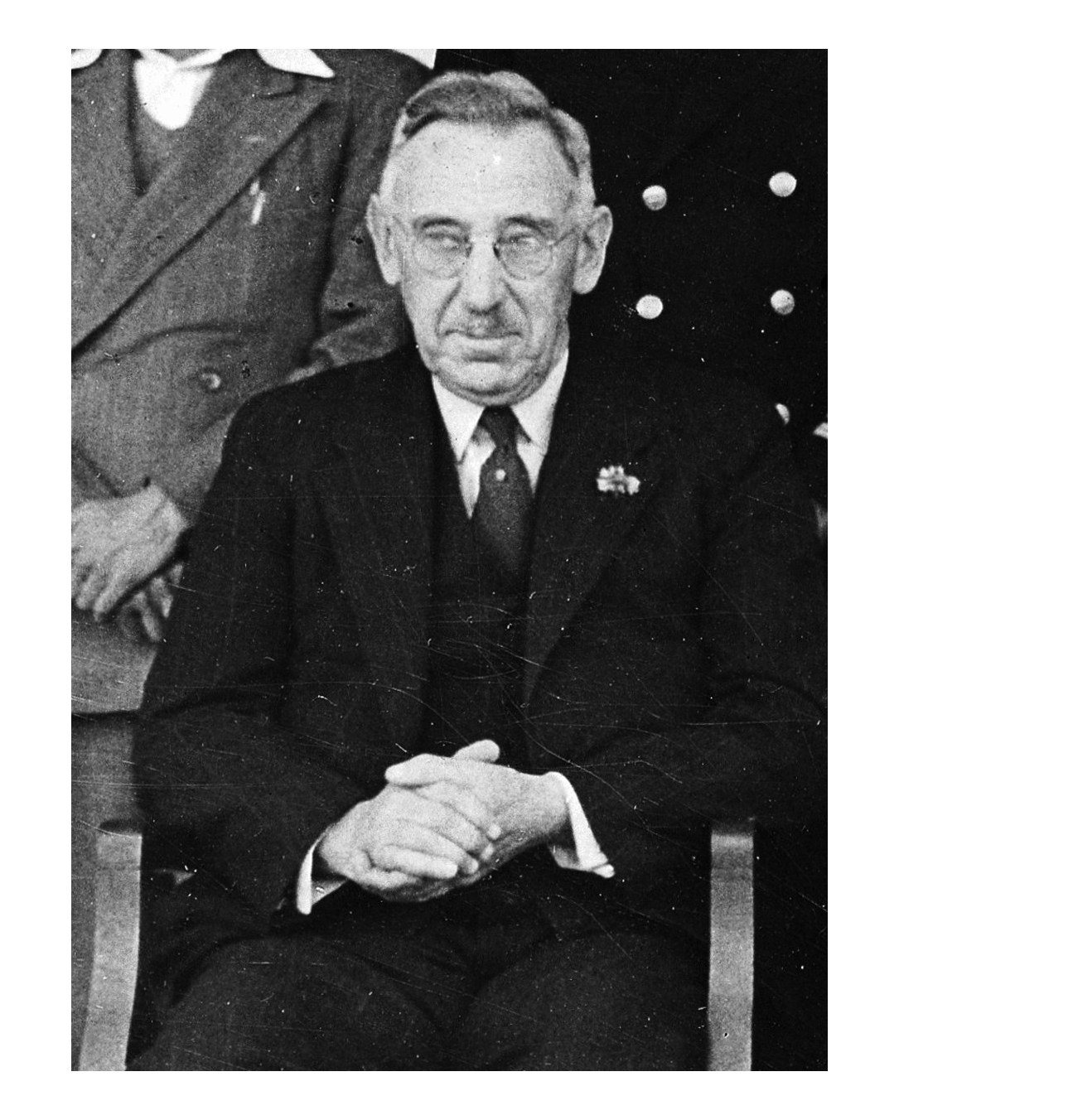
British medical mission in Lahore, India5

He was appointed medical officer to the central board of health in Western Australia in 1907.

In 1921, he was appointed the first Director-General of the Australian Government's Department of Health. Cumpston retired in May 1945, ahead of his term expiring on 18 June that year.

In 1949, he accepted a position in Sri Lanka (then known as Ceylon), advising on the introduction of a new health scheme for the country.

He married Gladys Maeva, the daughter of Dr G. A. Walpole of Gormanston, Tasmania, on 2 January 1908. Among their seven children was Ina Mary, an academic historian of British imperialism, and John Stanley, diplomat, author and publisher.

Cumpston died in Forrest, Canberra on 9 October 1954, and was cremated.

== Awards ==
In March 1929, Cumpston was appointed a Companion of the Order of St Michael and St George for services as Director-General of Health and Quarantine.

== See also ==
- History of public health in Australia

Government offices
New title Department established	Director-General of the Department of Health; 1921 – 1945	Succeeded by Frank McCallum
