= Frank McCallum (public servant) =

Dr Frank McCallum

Director-General of the Department of Health
- In office 1 June 1945 – 25 September 1946

Personal details
- Born: 26 May 1890 Ararat, Victoria, Australia
- Died: 25 September 1946 (aged 56) Royal Prince Alfred Hospital, Sydney, New South Wales, Australia
- Spouse(s): Kate Annie Hosking (m. 1926–1929; her death)
- Education: University of Melbourne
- Occupation: Public servant

Frank "Doc" McCallum (26 May 1890 – 25 September 1946) was a senior Australian public servant and medical practitioner, best known for his time as Director-General of the Department of Health.

== Life and career ==
McCallum was born in Ararat, Victoria on 26 May 1890. He attended Wesley College for schooling, and later the University of Melbourne. In his final year of Medicine at University, during World War I, McCallum enrolled to serve in the first First Australian Imperial Force. He was sent to Gallipoli, before being recalled to Australia by Government order to complete his studies.

McCallum joined the Commonwealth Public Service in the Department of Trade and Customs, in 1920.

In May 1945, McCallum was appointed Director-General of the Department of Health. For most of his term in office, McCallum was in ill health.

McCallum died in the Royal Prince Alfred Hospital, Sydney, on 25 September 1946.

== Awards ==
In 1922, McCallum was awarded a Rockefeller Foundation scholarship to study public health and epidemiology in the United States and the United Kingdom.

Government offices
Preceded by John Cumpston	Director-General of the Department of Health; 1945 – 1946	Succeeded by Arthur Metcalfe
