= Richard Refshauge =

Australian judge

Richard Christopher Refshauge AM (born 1947) is a former Australian judge.

== Early life ==
Refshauge was born in 1947, the son of Major General Sir William Refshauge and his wife Helen (née Allwright). One brother is Andrew, who went on to become Deputy Premier of New South Wales. He was educated at the Australian National University, graduating BA (Hons) in 1972 and LLB in 1975. He was president of the Australian National University Students' Association in 1972.

== Career ==
Refshauge worked for Canberra law firm Macphillamy Cummins & Gibson from 1976, becoming a partner in 1981 and the senior partner in 1992. The firm merged with Sly & Weigall in 1994 which then changed its name to Deacons Graham & James in 1995 (subsequently acquired by Norton Rose).

From 1980 Refshauge taught part-time in what was then called the Faculty of Law at the ANU. From 2001 he was an adjunct professor. He is the editor of the standard text on court practice in the ACT, Civil Procedure ACT.

In 1998 Refshauge was appointed Australian Capital Territory Director of Public Prosecutions. In 2008 he was appointed a judge of the Supreme Court of the Australian Capital Territory. He retired from the Supreme Court in 2017 on reaching the statutory retirement age of 70. He was appointed Acting Judge of the ACT Drug and Alcohol Court in 2020.

Refshauge was appointed a Member of the Order of Australia in the 2025 Australia Day Honours for "significant service to the community of the Australian Capital Territory, and to the arts".

== Personal life ==
Refshauge is married to Barbara.

Legal offices
| Preceded by Ken Crispin | Judge of the Supreme Court of the Australian Capital Territory; 2008–2017 | Succeeded by David Mossop |
