= Department of Health (Australia) =

The Department of Health refers to either of two former Australian government departments:

- Department of Health (Australia, 1921–1987); first iteration
- Department of Health (Australia, 2013–2022); second and final iteration
