= Lawrie Willett =

Lawrie Willett AO

Director-General of the Department of Health
- In office 1 January 1983 – 9 September 1984

Personal details
- Born: Lawrence John Willett; 1938 (age 87–88) Brisbane, Queensland, Australia
- Spouse: Helen
- Occupation: Public servant, university Chancellor

Lawrence John "Lawrie" Willett AO (born 1938) is a former senior Australian public servant and university Chancellor.

== Life and career ==
Willett was born in Brisbane in 1938.

He joined the Commonwealth Public Service, in the Department of Customs and Excise, in 1957, after completing his secondary schooling at Brisbane State High School. Willett's early public service positions were in Queensland, before he transferred to Canberra in 1963.

Willett worked as a senior Customs representative in Tokyo between 1971 and 1974.

Willett was Director-General of the Department of Health between 1983 and 1984. He was the first person with a non-medical background to be appointed to that role.

In October 1984, he was appointed Chairman of the Superannuation Fund Investment Trust, handling the compulsory superannuation contributions of Commonwealth public servants.

Willett was appointed Charles Sturt University Chancellor in 2002. He served in the role for 12 years, welcoming Michele Allan as his successor in 2014. While Chancellor, Willett was instrumental in the establishment of the veterinary science program at the university, and the institution grew to become the largest provider of higher education in regional Australia.

== Awards and honours ==
In June 1994, Willett was made an Officer of the Order of Australia for service to public administration, education and the community.

In 2014, Willett was honoured with an honorary doctorate at Charles Sturt University.

Government offices
| Preceded by Gwyn Howells | Director-General of the Department of Health; 1983 – 1984 | Succeeded by Bernard McKay |
Civic offices
| Preceded by | Mayor of Gunning Shire Council; 1999 – 2004 | Succeeded by |
Academic offices
| Preceded by David Asimus | Chancellor of Charles Sturt University; 2002 – 2014 | Succeeded by Michele Allan |
