= Joan Refshauge =

Australian physician (1906-1979)

Joan Janet Brown Refshauge OBE (3 December 1906 – 25 July 1979) was a New Guinea–based Australian medical practitioner, administrator, and schoolteacher. In 1964, she was honored with the OBE and the Cilento Medal.

== Early life and education ==
Refshauge was born in Armadale, Victoria, the eldest of five siblings. One of her brothers was Major General Sir William Dudley Refshauge (1913–2009). She attended University High School, Presbyterian Ladies' College, and the University of Melbourne (BSc, 1928; MSc, 1929; MB/B.S., 1939). She was a math teacher from 1930 to 1935, after which she became a physician.

== Career ==
Refshauge was a resident at the Alfred Hospital and later the Queen Victoria Hospital. She moved to the Chronic and Incurable Diseases Hospital while she was pregnant, but left before she gave birth to her son. She joined the Army Medical Corps during World War II, and was responsible for the health of women in the army in the Melbourne area. She was employed as a medical officer in the Public Health department of the Territory of Papua and New Guinea following the war.

=== New Guinea ===
Refshauge joined her husband in Port Moresby, Papua New Guinea, in 1947. As a female physician, she was allowed to deal only with maternal and children's issues. After her divorce in 1948, her son joined her there, and she ran the Maternal and Child Health Services. She recruited staff, organised the nurses' training, and oversaw school health-services.

During this time she established 21 central clinics, 528 village clinics, and 541 centres visited by mobile patrols in the ANGAU Territory, before her resignation in 1963, when she joined the Queensland Department of Health, and was named deputy-director of maternal and child welfare in 1968. She retired five years later in 1973.

== Personal life ==
On 19 May 1937, she married Max Bergin, a surveyor with the ANGAU. Their son (her only child), Rupert Bergin, was born in 1942. Max and Joan Bergin divorced in 1948.

Refshauge died on 25 July 1979, aged 72, from undisclosed causes at Auchenflower, Brisbane, Queensland. She was survived by her son, Rupert Bergin.

== Awards and honours ==
- 1964, OBE
- 1964, Cilento Medal "in honour of ... excellent work for maternal and child health in Papua-New Guinea"

== Selected works ==
- C. Bell (editor), The Diseases and Health Services of Papua New Guinea (Port Moresby, 1973)
- L. M. Hellstedt (editor), Women Physicians of the World (Washington, 1978)
- E. Kettle, That They Might Live (privately published, Sydney, 1979)
- J. Byford, Dealing with Death, Beginning with Birth: Women's Health and Childbirth on Misima Island, Papua New Guinea (Ph.D. thesis, Australian National University, 1999)
