= Richard McCoy (politician) =

Australian politician

Richard Watson Walker McCoy (7 November 1863 – 17 April 1942) was an Australian politician.

He was born at Redfern to boot manufacturer Richard McCoy and Anne King. He attended Fort Street Public School and Sydney Grammar School, leaving at fifteen to work for the Oriental Bank Corporation. He completed his education privately and in 1881 was articled a solicitor's clerk. Admitted as a solicitor in 1887, he and his brother established McCoy and McCoy (later McCoy, Grove & Atkinson), and he was also an alderman at Marrickville from 1894 to 1896, serving as mayor for the final year of his term. In 1901 he was elected to the New South Wales Legislative Assembly as the Liberal member for Marrickville. He served until his retirement in 1910. McCoy died in Wahroonga in 1942.

New South Wales Legislative Assembly
Preceded by Francis McLean	Member for Marrickville; 1901–1910	Succeeded by Thomas Crawford
