= Arthur Metcalfe (public servant) =

Australian public servant

Dr Arthur Metcalfe CBE

Director-General of the Department of Health
- In office 20 October 1947 – 1 September 1960

Personal details
- Born: Arthur John Metcalfe; 26 June 1895 Newcastle, New South Wales, Australia
- Died: 24 March 1971 (aged 75) Harbord, Sydney, New South Wales, Australia
- Education: University of Sydney
- Occupation: Public servant

Arthur John Metcalfe CBE (26 June 1895 – 24 March 1971) was a senior Australian public servant, best known for his time as Director-General of the Department of Health.

== Life and career ==
Metcalfe was born in Newcastle on 26 June 1895 to English-born parents.

In October 1947, Metcalfe was appointed Commonwealth Director-General of Health, having been Acting-Director-General for more than a year prior after the illness and death of former Director-General Frank McCallum. He led the Department implementing the National Health Act 1953, which consolidated the hospital, pharmaceutical and medical benefits schemes operated by the Australian Government.

He retired from the position in 1960. In 1961 he took on an appointment as consultant to Lederie Laboratories Products.

Metcalfe died on 24 March 1971 in Sydney, aged 76.

== Awards ==
In 1947, Metcalfe was awarded a Rockefeller Foundation scholarship and spent four months studying national health schemes in the United States, the United Kingdom, Canada and Europe.

Metcalfe was made a Commander of the Order of the British Empire in 1954 for services as Director-General of health and quarantine.

Government offices
Preceded by Frank McCallum	Director-General of the Department of Health; 1947 – 1960	Succeeded by William Refshauge
