= William Long (Australian politician) =

Australian politician

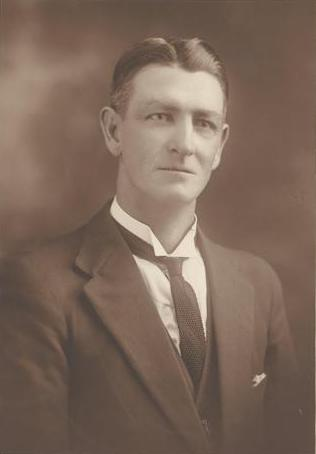

Member of the Australian Parliament for Lang
- In office 17 November 1928 – 19 December 1931
- Preceded by: Elliot Johnson
- Succeeded by: Dick Dein

Personal details
- Born: 18 June 1885 Newcastle, New South Wales
- Died: 3 March 1957 (aged 71)
- Party: Australian Labor Party
- Occupation: Boilermaker

William John Long (18 June 1885 – 3 March 1957) was an Australian politician.

Born in Newcastle, New South Wales, he received a primary education before becoming a boilermaker at the Eveleigh Railway Workshops for fifteen years and a member of the Federated Boilermakers Society. He was the unsuccessful Labor candidate for Botany at the 1925 state election and for Nepean at the 1927 state election.

He was elected to the Australian House of Representatives as the Labor member for Lang at the 1928 federal election, defeating long-serving Nationalist MP and Speaker of the Australian House of Representatives Elliot Johnson. Long held the seat until his own defeat in 1931.

He made a final bid for public office at the 1944 state election, when he unsuccessfully contested the Parramatta as an independent. He died in 1957.

Parliament of Australia
Preceded by Elliot Johnson	Member for Lang; 1928 – 1931	Succeeded by Dick Dein
