= Thomas Simpson Crawford =

Australian politician (1875–1976)

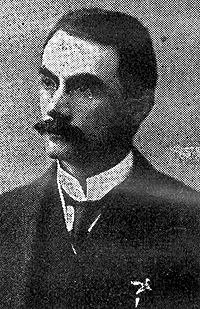
Thomas Simpson Crawford

Thomas Simpson Crawford QC, (21 December 1875 – 20 April 1976) was an Australian politician and New South Wales Senior Crown Prosecutor.

== Biography ==
Born and raised in Bulli, New South Wales, the son of a miner, Crawford left school at age 14 to work first as a clerk in the New South Wales railways department and later as a telegraph operator. In 1894, he decided to enter the Presbyterian ministry, and thus resumed his studies under the guidance of his former headmaster and tutor in classics, Joseph Bourke. Crawford later went to Sydney Boys' High School, and the Cooerwull Academy at Bowenfels, and eventually graduated from the University of Sydney with a BA and MA. Ordained a Minister in 1902, Crawford was based in Newcastle and Campsie before he had a calling of a different kind and resigned from the ministry to enter politics.

Crawford contested the federal Division of Lang for the Australian Labor Party (ALP) at the 1910 election, gaining a swing of 19.4% but failing to be elected. He had more luck at the New South Wales state election later that year, winning the Electoral district of Marrickville. Crawford served in the New South Wales Legislative Assembly from 1910 to 1917, firstly as an ALP representative before leaving Labor with other pro-conscriptionists to join the Nationalist Party of Australia. Crawford was defeated at the 1917 election by his Labor opponent.

During his time in parliament, Crawford studied law and was admitted to the bar in 1912 and was appointed a Crown Prosecutor in 1917. In 1922 he authored Crawford's Proof in Criminal Cases, a treatise on crime still widely referred to in the Australian legal community.

Promoted to Metropolitan Crown Prosecutor in 1930 and appointed King's Counsel in 1935, Crawford was made Senior Crown Prosecutor in 1940.

Following his retirement in 1947, Crawford continued to act in various prosecutions and advised on legal issues in Nauru and the Solomon Islands. He led the prosecution in "Nauru's first murder trial", which saw the acquittal of a Nauruan policeman, Agoko, on charges of murdering two Chinese labourers during the 1948 Nauru riots.

Crawford died in Newcastle, aged 100, outliving his wife by 38 years.

== Personal life ==
Crawford's brother James Crawford was a member of the Legislative Assembly of Queensland from 1909 to 1915. His nephews included economist John Crawford and historian Max Crawford.

New South Wales Legislative Assembly
Preceded by Richard McCoy	Member for Marrickville; 1910 – 1917	Succeeded by Carlo Lazzarini
