= Dick Dein =

Australian politician

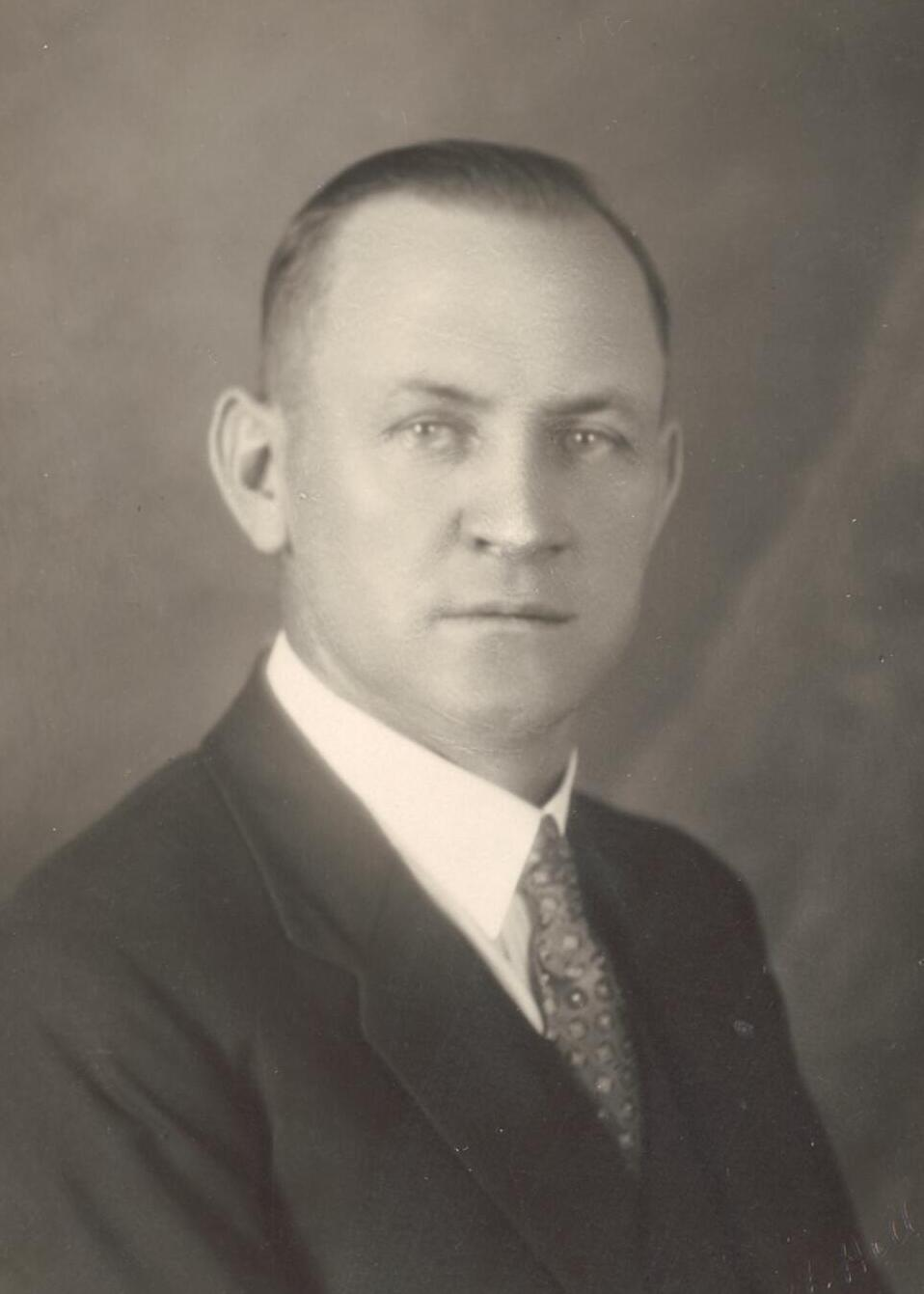

Member of the Australian Parliament for Lang
- In office 19 December 1931 – 7 August 1934
- Preceded by: William Long
- Succeeded by: Dan Mulcahy

Senator for New South Wales
- In office 1 July 1935 – 30 June 1941

Personal details
- Born: 1889 Orange, New South Wales
- Died: 9 May 1969 (aged 79–80)
- Party: United Australia Party
- Occupation: Teacher

Adam Kemball "Dick" Dein (1889 – 9 May 1969) was an Australian politician. He was a United Australia Party member of the Australian House of Representatives from 1931 to 1934, representing the electorate of Lang, and of the Australian Senate for New South Wales from 1934 to 1940.

Dein was born at Lucknow, New South Wales and was educated at Shadforth Public School. He left school at 14 and worked as a gold miner and on a dairy farm before training as a teacher in 1907. He taught at Hadsonville and Hanover, Neville, Dubbo and Narromine before moving to Dulwich Hill in Sydney in 1921. In 1926, he was promoted to deputy headmaster of Dulwich Hill Public School. He was heavily involved in local sporting circles, playing both first-grade cricket and tennis for Marrickville. He was president of the Dulwich Hill branch of the Nationalist Party from 1926 to 1931.

In 1929, he contested the Division of Lang in the Australian House of Representatives as a Nationalist, but was unsuccessful. He ran again in 1931 under the banner of the United Australia Party and won. A redistribution ahead of the 1934 election turned Lang into a very safe Labor seat. Rather than face certain defeat, Dein contested the Senate instead, and was successful. He was defeated in 1940.

He opened a timber business in 1939 and operated it thereafter. He served as a Marrickville Council councillor from 1944 to 1950 and on the Sydney County Council from 1949 to 1950. He subsequently moved to Manly, and was a Manly Council councillor from 1962 to 1968 and Mayor of Manly in 1966. He died in 1969 and was cremated at the Northern Suburbs Crematorium.

Parliament of Australia
Preceded by William Long	Member for Lang; 1931 – 1934	Succeeded by Dan Mulcahy
Civic offices
Preceded by William R. Nicholas	Mayor of Manly; 1966	Succeeded by David Hay
