= William Refshauge =

Australian general and public health administrator (1913 - 2009)

Major General Sir William Refshauge AC, CBE, ED, FRCOG

Director-General of the Department of Health
- In office 1960–1973

Personal details
- Born: 3 April 1913 Wangaratta, Victoria
- Died: 27 May 2009 (aged 96)
- Spouse(s): Helen Allwright (m. 1942–2002; her death)
- Children: Bill, Richard, Andrew, Michael and Kathryn
- Parent(s): Francis and Margaret Craig
- Occupation: Public servant
- Civilian awards: Companion of the Order of Australia; Knight Bachelor

Military service
- Allegiance: Australia
- Branch/service: Australian Army
- Rank: Major General
- Battles/wars: Second World War
- Military awards: Commander of the Order of the British Empire; Efficiency Decoration; Mentioned in Despatches (4)

Major General Sir William Dudley Duncan Refshauge, AC, CBE, ED, FRCOG (3 April 1913 – 27 May 2009) was an Australian soldier and public health administrator. He was Honorary Physician to Queen Elizabeth II (1955–64), director-general of the Australian Government Department of Health (1960–73), and secretary-general of the World Medical Association (1973–76).

== Early years and education ==
William Dudley Duncan Refshauge was born in Wangaratta, Victoria on 3 April 1913, where his father was headmaster of the Wangaratta High School. One of his four siblings was Joan Refshauge (1906–1979), a medical practitioner and administrator who did significant work in Papua New Guinea. The family was of Danish extraction and are descendants of Peder Pedersen Refshauge. The family moved to Hampton, Melbourne when his father became ill. He was involved in the Boy Scouts movement, and later with the sport of rowing.

Refshauge attended Scotch College, Melbourne and was selected in the First Eight for the Melbourne Head of the River while still aged only 15, and rowed in three subsequent years. He studied medicine at the University of Melbourne, was awarded a University Blue for Rowing, and graduated in 1938. He became resident medical officer at The Alfred Hospital the following year.

== Military career ==
=== Second World War ===
In 1939, when the Second World War started, Refshauge joined the Second Australian Imperial Force as a medical officer with the rank of captain in the 2nd Field Ambulance. He saw service in the Middle East, the Battle of Bardia, the capture of Tobruk, the Greek campaign, the Battle of Crete, New Guinea and Borneo. He was promoted to major in 1942 and later to lieutenant colonel. He was mentioned in despatches four times and was appointed an Officer of the Order of the British Empire in 1944. In Syria, he took charge of a hospital where he treated the local sex workers for sexually transmitted diseases, which caused the incidence of disease amongst the local soldiers to drop.

=== Post-war ===
After the war, Refshauge decided to specialise in obstetrics and gynaecology and became a member of the Royal College of Obstetricians and Gynaecologists. He was appointed the first permanent medical superintendent of the Women's Hospital (now Royal Women's Hospital), Melbourne, in 1948.

In 1951, during the Korean War, Refshauge rejoined the Australian Army and was appointed deputy director-general of Army Medical Services. In 1955, at the age of 42, he was appointed director-general with the rank of major general. He assisted in the establishment of the Army School of Health at Healesville, Victoria, and adopted a system of training and recruiting medical officers. He attended the nuclear testing sites of Bikini Atoll and Enewetak Atoll, but was not consulted during the British nuclear tests at Maralinga.

== Affiliations ==
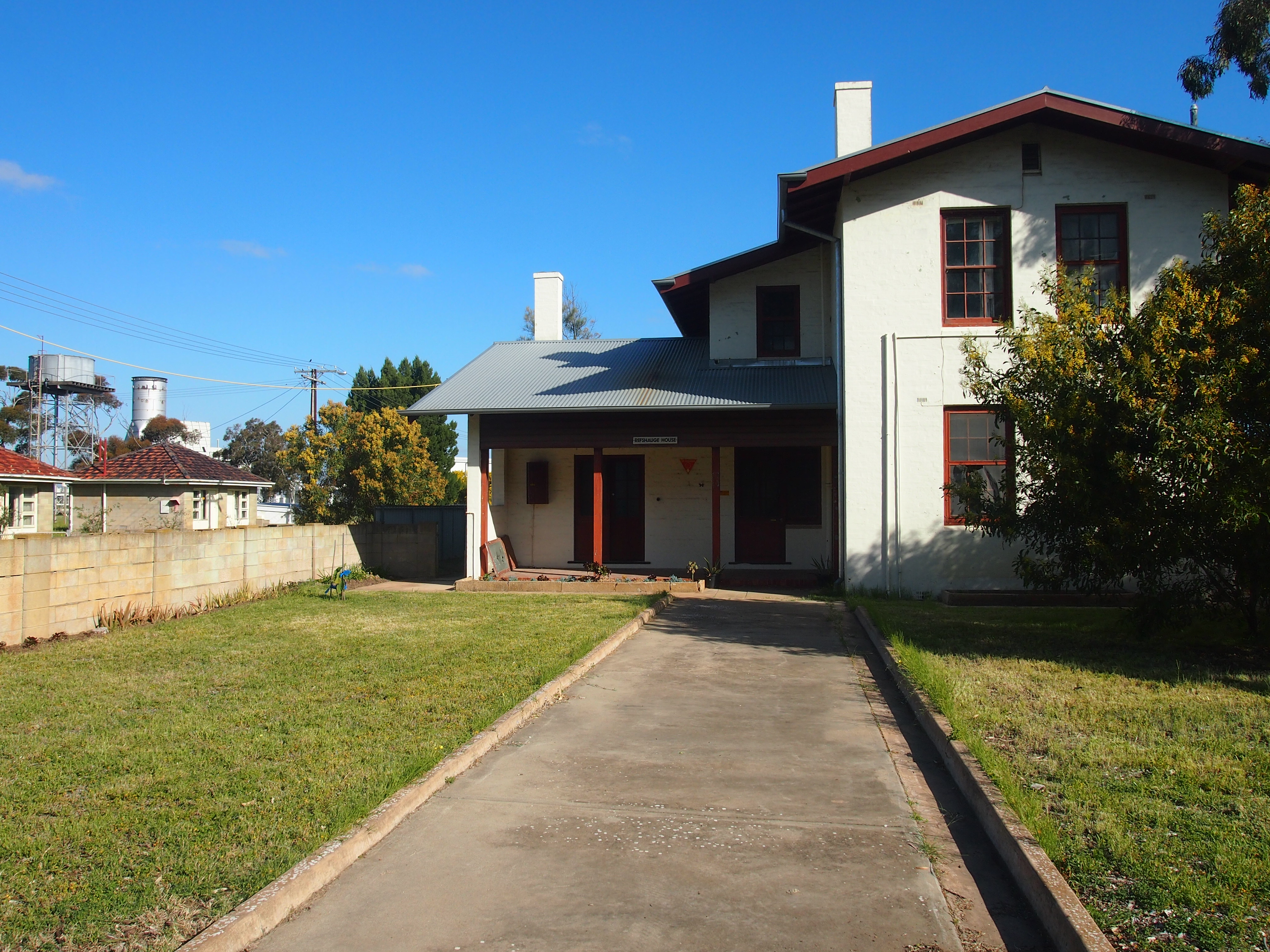
Refshauge House, at the former Torrens Island Quarantine Station, SA, was named for Sir William Refshauge.

From 1955 to 1964, Refshauge was Honorary Physician to Queen Elizabeth II. In 1960, he was appointed Director-General of the Australian Government Department of Health, serving until 1973. He was also Chairman of the National Health and Medical Research Council, the Commonwealth Council for National Fitness, the National Tuberculosis Council and various other advisory bodies. From 1961 to 1966, he was also Joint Services Medical Adviser in the Department of Defence and Chairman of the Defence Forces Medical Services Rationalization Committee. From 1962 to 1973 he was Deputy National Coordinator for The Duke of Edinburgh's Award. He maintained his interest in rowing, and was a member of the Organising Committee for the 1964 Australian Rowing Championships and Olympic Trials on Lake Burley Griffin, Canberra.

In the international field, Refshauge attended many meetings of the World Health Organization as chief Australian delegate. He was chairman of the two main committees of the World Health Assembly, chairman of the executive board of WHO, and president of the 24th World Health Assembly in 1971.

In 1973, Refshauge became secretary-general of the World Medical Association, near Geneva, a post he held until 1976. He instigated the move of the secretariat from New York City to Geneva to work more closely with the office of the WHO. He rewrote the Helsinki Declaration of Ethics for the WHO but eventually resigned because of a lack support from his board.

Refshauge was a national trustee of the Returned and Services League (RSL) 1962–1973 and again from 1977. He led the RSL Tour of the Battlefields of Europe to commemorate the 60th anniversary of Remembrance Day on 11 November 1978.

Refshauge was a member of the national committee of the Menzies Foundation 1979–1983, and was deputy chairman of its research advisory committee. From 1979 to 1988 he was honorary consultant to the Australian Foundation on Alcoholism and Drug Dependence. He was also a Fellow of the Royal College of Obstetricians and Gynaecologists, the Royal Australasian College of Physicians, the Royal Australasian College of Surgeons, the Royal Australian College of Medical Administrators (he was censor-in-chief 1968–1973) and a Foundation Fellow of the Royal Australian College of Obstetricians and Gynaecologists. He was an Honorary Fellow of the Royal Society of Health and a Life Member of the Australian Dental Association. He was a board member of the Walter and Eliza Hall Institute of Medical Research.

In 1983, Refshauge was chairman of the interim board to develop and establish the Menzies School of Health Research in Darwin, Northern Territory, and became chairman of the board of governors 1985–87. In 1987 he was appointed chairman of a planning committee to develop a Menzies Centre for Population Health Research within the University of Tasmania. From 1986 to 1988 he was chairman of the Research Into Drug Abuse Advisory Committee for the Commonwealth Government's Drug Offensive.

== Awards ==
In 1959, Refshauge was appointed a Commander of the Order of the British Empire (CBE) for his services to the army, and in 1965 was awarded the Efficiency Decoration (ED). In 1966 he was knighted for his services as director-general of health. In 1980 he was appointed a Companion of the Order of Australia (AC) "for public service and service to the medical profession, particularly in the field of Public Health", and in 1988 he was awarded the honorary degree of Doctor of Medicine by the University of Sydney. In 1990 he was awarded the RSL's ANZAC Peace Prize for his contribution to world health and world peace. This was presented by the then Governor-General, Bill Hayden. In 1991 he was awarded the RSL's highest award, the Meritorious Medal.

== Family ==
In 1942, Refshauge married Helen Elizabeth Allwright, a senior nursing sister at the Alfred Hospital, and they had four sons and a daughter. Two of their sons are Andrew Refshauge, a former Deputy Premier of New South Wales, and Richard Refshauge, a former judge of the Supreme Court of the Australian Capital Territory. Their daughter Kathryn Refshauge is Dean of the Faculty of Health Sciences at the University of Sydney.

Sir William Refshauge died on 27 May 2009, aged 96.

== Legacy ==
In 1999 the annual Sir William Refshauge Lecture was inaugurated. In 2001 he was one of 43 prominent Australians who were co-signatories of a letter to the Prime Minister, John Howard, calling for the lifting of economic sanctions against Iraq. He was a member of the Honour Roll in the 2007 National Drug and Alcohol Awards of the Australian Drug Foundation. Long aware of the obscenity of the effects of war, in 1989 Sir William became, and remained until his death, Patron of the Medical Association for Prevention of War (Australia).

Refshauge Crescent in MacGregor, Australian Capital Territory is named after Refshauge. A playground, name Refshauge Playground is also on the street.

Government offices
Preceded by Arthur Metcalfe	Secretary of the Department of Health; 1960–1973	Succeeded by Gwyn Howells
