= Elliot Johnson (politician) =

Australian politician (1862–1932)

The Honourable Sir Elliot Johnson KCMG
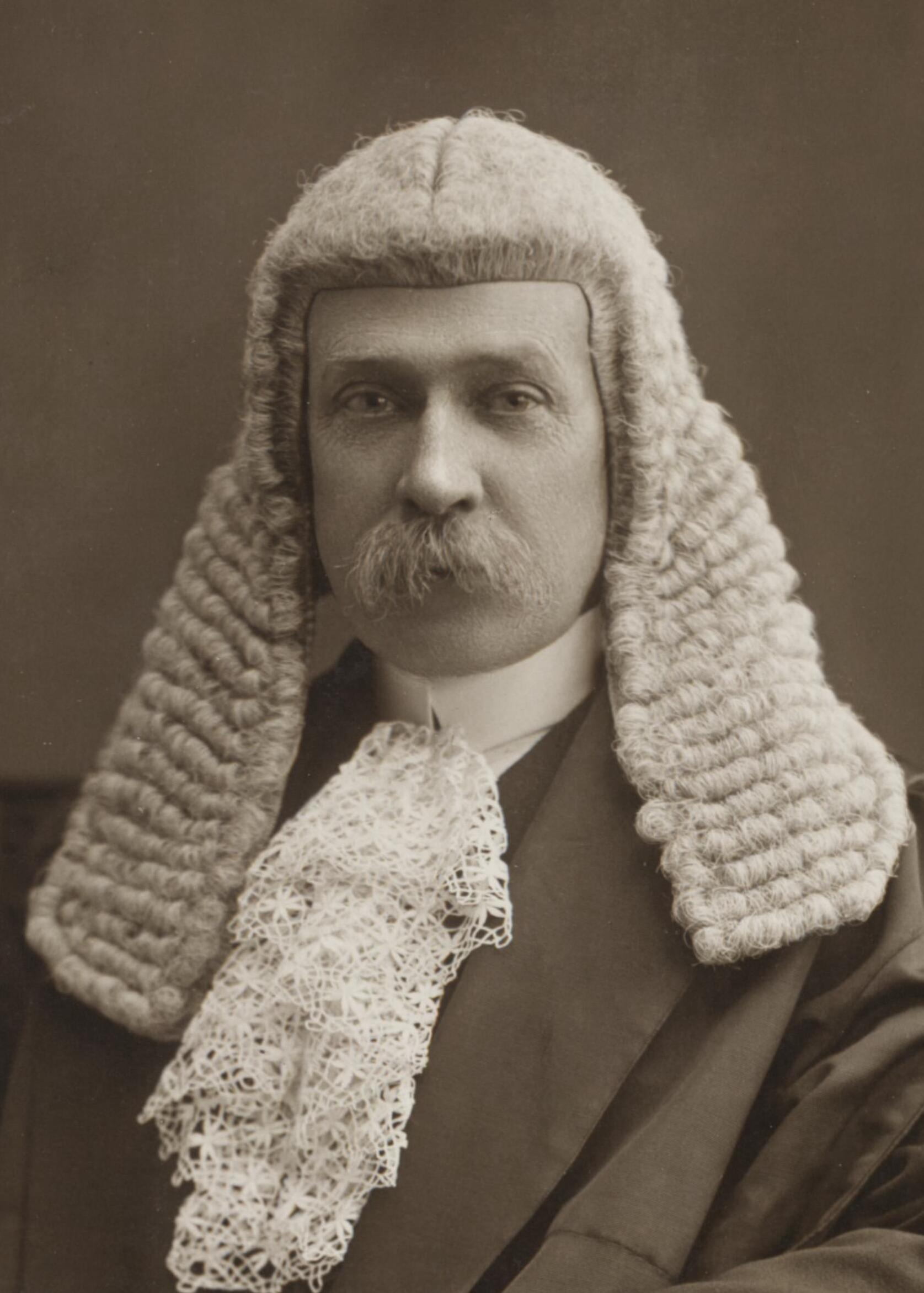

Speaker of the House of Representatives
- In office 14 June 1917 – 27 February 1923
- Preceded by: Charles McDonald
- Succeeded by: William Watt
- In office 9 July 1913 – 7 October 1914
- Preceded by: Charles McDonald
- Succeeded by: Charles McDonald

Member of the Australian Parliament for Lang
- In office 16 December 1903 – 17 November 1928
- Preceded by: Francis McLean
- Succeeded by: William Long

Personal details
- Born: 10 April 1862 Newcastle, England
- Died: 8 December 1932 (aged 70) Geelong, Victoria
- Party: Labor (early 1890s); Free Trade (1903–1906); Anti-Socialist (1906–09); Liberal (1909–17); Nationalist (from 1917)
- Spouse: Marie McLachlan (m. 1881)
- Occupation: Sailor

Sir William Elliot Johnson KCMG (10 April 1862 – 8 December 1932) was an Australian politician. He was a long-serving member of the House of Representatives (1903–1928) and served non-consecutive terms as Speaker of the House (1913–1914, 1917–1923). He began his career in the Australian Labor Party (ALP) during the early 1890s, but was a member of the anti-Labor parties throughout his tenure in parliament.

== Early life ==
Johnson was born at Newcastle upon Tyne, England, the son of a scene-painter.

Johnson was an early member of the Labor Electoral League of New South Wales and served as president of its Newtown branch. He was also a contributor to the Labour Defence Journal. At the 1894 general election he was an unsuccessful candidate for the seat of Marrickville. Johnson later left the party on the grounds that it had "turned wrongly towards socialism and state interference". He was subsequently honorary secretary of the Free Trade and Liberal Association of New South Wales.

== Politics ==
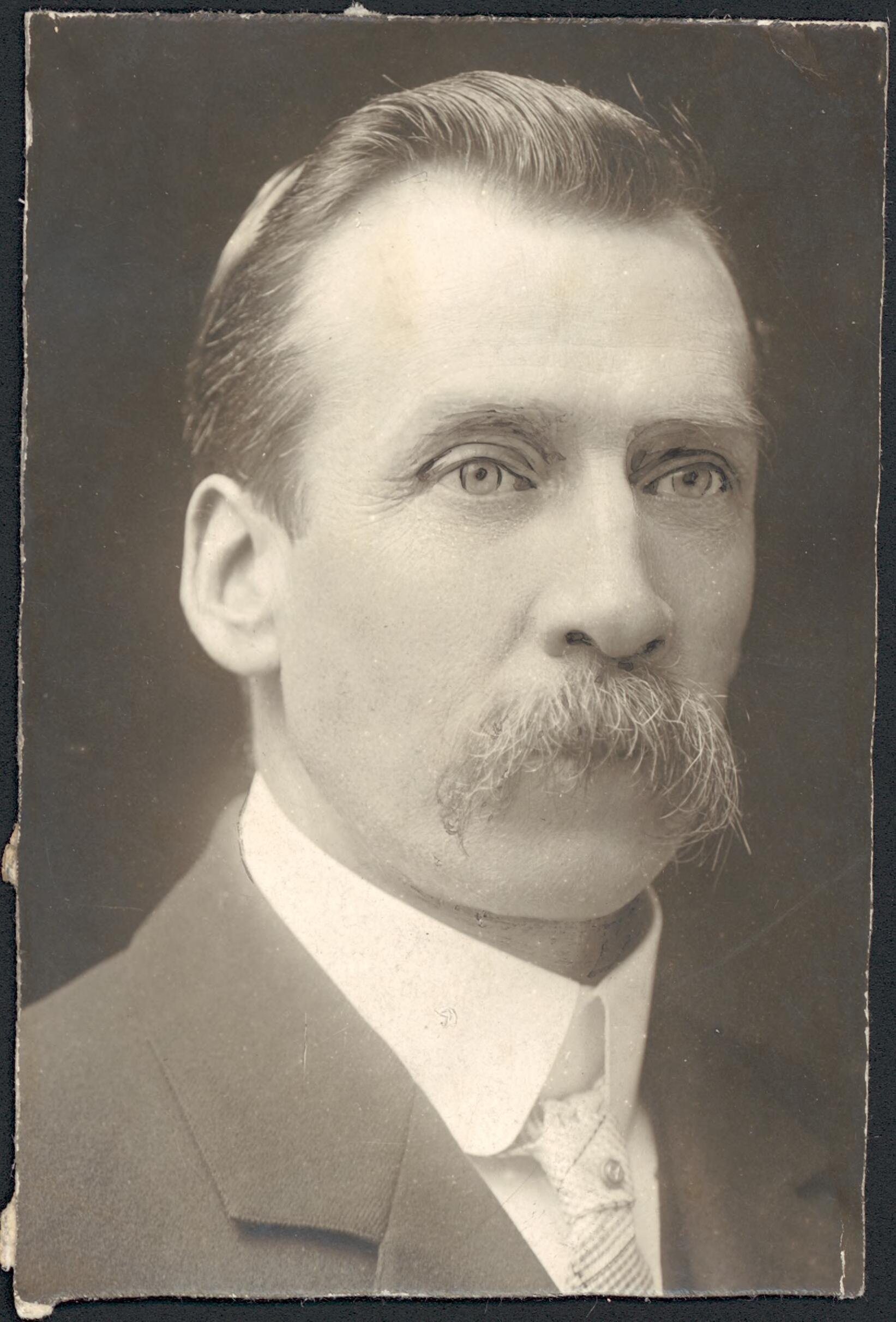
Undated photo

He was defeated at the 1928 general election.

== Personal life ==
Johnson died at Geelong, Victoria, in 1932. He was created a Knight Commander of the Order of St Michael and St George (KCMG) in 1920.

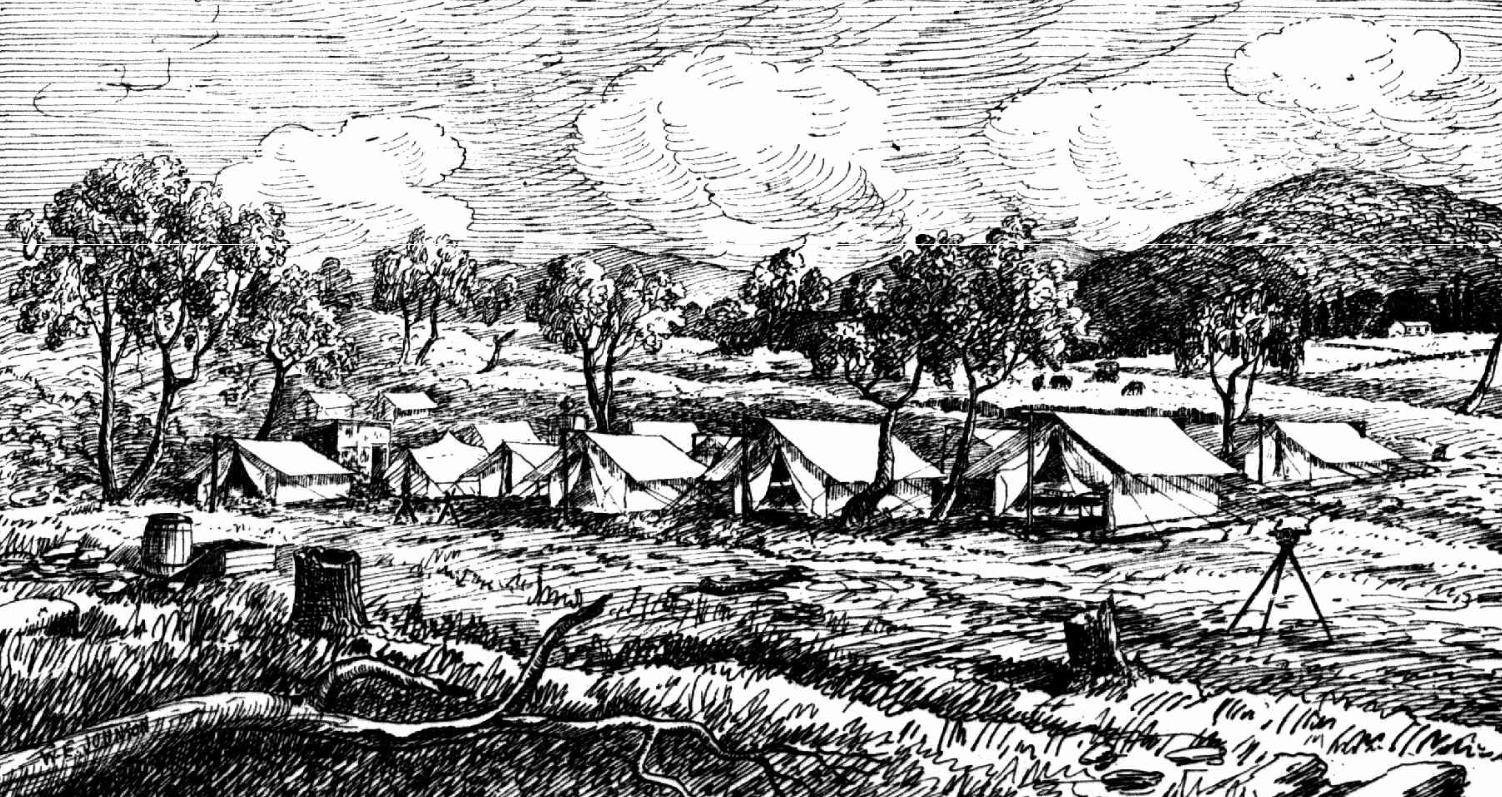
Surveyor's Camp at Canberra (1910), by W.E. Johnson.

== See also ==
- Speaker of the Australian House of Representatives
- Australian House of Representatives
- Australian Labor Party
- 1928 Australian federal election

Parliament of Australia
Preceded by Charles McDonald	Speaker of the Australian House of Representatives; 1913–1914	Succeeded by Charles McDonald
Preceded by Charles McDonald	Speaker of the Australian House of Representatives; 1917–1923	Succeeded by William Watt
Preceded by Francis McLean	Member for Lang; 1903–1928	Succeeded by William Long
