= Dan Mulcahy =

Australian politician

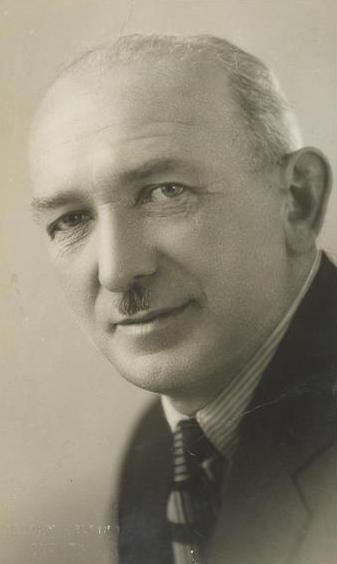

Member of the Australian Parliament for Lang
- In office 15 September 1934 – 13 July 1953
- Preceded by: Dick Dein
- Succeeded by: Frank Stewart

Personal details
- Born: 7 January 1882 Milltown, Ireland
- Died: 13 July 1953 (aged 71) Vaucluse, New South Wales, Australia
- Party: Lang Labor (1934–36); Labor (1936–40); Lang Labor (1940–41); Labor (1941–53)
- Occupation: Publican

Daniel Mulcahy (7 January 1882 – 13 July 1953) was an Australian politician. Born in Milltown, Ireland, he was educated at Irish Catholic schools and migrated to Australia as a youth. He became a publican in Sydney and served on both Waterloo Council, including several terms as mayor, and Sydney City Council. In 1934, he was elected to the Australian House of Representatives as the member for Lang, representing the Langite Australian Labor Party (NSW). Mulcahy joined the federal Labor Party when the two parties merged in 1936, but left the ALP for the Australian Labor Party (Non-Communist), another Lang party, in 1940. When this second split was resolved, Mulcahy again joined the federal ALP. He held his seat until his death in Vaucluse in 1953.

Civic offices
Preceded by William Wilcocks	Mayor of Waterloo; 1925–1928	Succeeded by Joseph Lynch
Preceded by Joseph Lynch	Mayor of Waterloo; 1929–1931	Succeeded by Sidney Patrick Rouhan
Parliament of Australia
Preceded by Dick Dein	Member for Lang; 1934–1953	Succeeded by Frank Stewart
