= Bernard McKay =

Australian public servant

Bernard McKay AO

Secretary of the Department of Health
- In office 10 September 1984 – 24 July 1987

Personal details
- Born: 1940 (age 85–86)
- Occupation: Public servant

Bernard Vincent "Bernie" McKay (born 1939 or 1940) is a former senior Australian public servant. He was Secretary of the Department of Health between 1984 and 1987.

== Life and career ==
McKay was born in 1939 or 1940.

From 1972 to 1974, McKay was Assistant Director of ACT Health Services.

McKay was Secretary of the New South Wales Department of Health between December 1982 and September 1984, before the Prime Minister Bob Hawke appointed him to head the Australian Government Department of Health. His Department of Health appointment lasted until July 1987, when the Department was merged with the Department of Community Services to become the Department of Community Services and Health. When the merger took place, McKay was offered an Associate Secretary position at the new Department, but McKay refused the offer. His refusal was based on a dispute over the way the new Department was to be structured.

In October 1987, McKay was appointed to review Worksafe Australia, an Australian government agency tasked with improving health and safety standards in workplaces. The review was completed in 1988. It was highly critical of the organisation, stating that lack of direction, communications problems and inadequate coordination had led to an overall lack of progress in the organisation's first years of operation.

In 1994, McKay was involved in an independent review of transport regulation in the ACT, commissioned by the ACT Government Department of Urban Services.

In 2005, McKay led a review into the operation of ambulance services in the Northern Territory.

McKay was appointed an Officer of the Order of Australia (AO) in the 2017 Australia Day Honours.

Government offices
Preceded by Lawrie Willett	Secretary of the Department of Health; 1984 – 1987	Succeeded by Tony Ayers as Secretary of the Department of Community Services and Health
