= Gwyn Howells =

Australian public servant

Gwyn Howells CB

Director-General of the Department of Health
- In office 1 September 1973 – 31 December 1982

Personal details
- Born: Birmingham, England; 13 May 1918
- Died: 26 July 1997 (aged 79)
- Spouse(s): Simone (née Maufe) (m. 1941–1997; his death)
- Education: University of London
- Occupation: Public servant

Gwyn Howells CB (13 May 1918 – 26 July 1997) was a senior Australian public servant, best known for his time as Director-General of the Department of Health.

== Life and career ==
Howells was born on 13 May 1918 in Birmingham, England. He studied at the University of London.

He joined the Department of Health in 1966, as first assistant director-general in charge of the tuberculosis division.

Howells was appointed Director-General of Health in 1973. He left the position on 31 December 1982, five months ahead of his official date of retirement.

Howells died on 26 July 1997.

== Awards ==
In the 1979 Queen's Birthday Honours Howells was appointed a Companion of the Order of the Bath for service as Director-General of the Department of Health.

Government offices
Preceded by William Refshauge	Director-General of the Department of Health; 1973–1982	Succeeded by Lawrie Willett
