= Francis McLean (politician) =

Australian politician

The Honourable Francis McLean
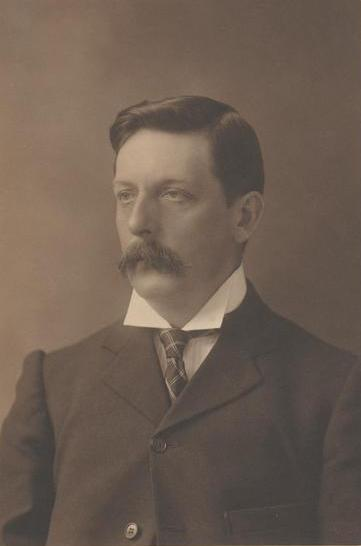

Member of the Australian Parliament for Lang
- In office 29 March 1901 – 23 November 1903
- Preceded by: New seat
- Succeeded by: Elliot Johnson

Personal details
- Born: 1863 Sydney
- Died: 4 April 1926 (aged 62–63) Springwood, New South Wales, Australia
- Party: Free Trade Party
- Occupation: Accountant

Francis Edward McLean (1863 – 4 April 1926) was an Australian politician. Born in Sydney, he received a primary education before becoming a clerk, and eventually an accountant and businessman. In 1894 he was elected to the New South Wales Legislative Assembly as the member for Marrickville, a member of the Free Trade Party. He held the seat until 1901, when he transferred to federal Parliament, winning the House of Representatives seat of Lang, again for the Free Trade Party. In 1903, he unsuccessfully attempted to defeat prominent Protectionist and former Premier of New South Wales William Lyne in his seat of Hume. He retired from politics and died in 1926.

New South Wales Legislative Assembly
New district	Member for Marrickville; 1894–1901	Succeeded by Richard McCoy
Parliament of Australia
New district	Member for Lang; 1901–1903	Succeeded by Elliot Johnson
