= Division of Lang =

Former Australian federal electoral division

Lang Australian House of Representatives Division
- Created: 1901
- Abolished: 1977
- Namesake: John Dunmore Lang

The Division of Lang was an Australian Electoral Division in the state of New South Wales. It was located in the southern suburbs of Sydney, and was named after Rev. John Dunmore Lang, a Member of the New South Wales Legislative Assembly and advocate of Australian independence. It originally included the suburbs of Kogarah and Marrickville, but by the time it was abolished in 1977, it covered the suburbs of Lakemba and Belmore. The Division was proclaimed in 1900, and was one of the original 75 divisions to be contested at the first Federal election. It was held by the Labor Party for all but one term after 1928, and in its final form was very safe for that party. It was abolished at the redistribution of 31 October 1977.

== Members ==
Image	Member	Party	Term	Notes
	Francis McLean (1863–1926)	Free Trade	29 March 1901 – 23 November 1903	Previously held the New South Wales Legislative Assembly seat of Marrickville. Did not contest in 1903. Failed to win the Division of Hume
	Sir Elliot Johnson (1862–1932)	Free Trade	16 December 1903 – 1906	Served as Speaker during the Cook, Hughes and Bruce Governments. Lost seat
	Sir Elliot Johnson (1862–1932)	Anti-Socialist	1906 – 26 May 1909	Served as Speaker during the Cook, Hughes and Bruce Governments. Lost seat
	Sir Elliot Johnson (1862–1932)	Liberal	26 May 1909 – 17 February 1917	Served as Speaker during the Cook, Hughes and Bruce Governments. Lost seat
	Sir Elliot Johnson (1862–1932)	Nationalist	17 February 1917 – 17 November 1928	Served as Speaker during the Cook, Hughes and Bruce Governments. Lost seat
	William Long (1885–1957)	Labor	17 November 1928 – 19 December 1931	Lost seat
	Dick Dein (1889–1969)	United Australia	19 December 1931 – 7 August 1934	Transferred to the Senate
	Dan Mulcahy (1882–1953)	Labor (NSW)	15 September 1934 – February 1936	Died in office
	Dan Mulcahy (1882–1953)	Labor	February 1936 – 2 May 1940	Died in office
	Dan Mulcahy (1882–1953)	Labor (Non-Communist)	2 May 1940 – February 1941	Died in office
	Dan Mulcahy (1882–1953)	Labor	February 1941 – 13 July 1953	Died in office
	Frank Stewart (1923–1979)	Labor	29 August 1953 – 10 December 1977	Served as minister under Whitlam. Transferred to the Division of Grayndler after Lang was abolished in 1977
