= Department of Health (Australia, 1921–1987) =

Former Australian government department, 1921–1987

Department overview
- Formed: 7 March 1921
- Dissolved: 24 July 1987
- Superseding Department: Department of Community Services and Health
- Jurisdiction: Commonwealth of Australia
- Department executives: John Cumpston, Director–General (1921–1945); Frank McCallum, Director–General (1945–1946); Arthur Metcalfe, Director–General (1946–1960); William Refshauge, Director–General (1960–1973); Gwyn Howells, Director–General (1973–1982); Lawrie Willett, Director–General (1983–1984); Bernard McKay, Secretary (1984–1987)

The Department of Health was an Australian government department that existed between March 1921 and July 1987.

In 1987, the Department of Health was merged with the Department of Community Services to form the Department of Community Services and Health.

== Scope ==
Information about the department's functions and government funding allocation could be found in the Administrative Arrangements Orders, the annual Portfolio Budget Statements and in the Department's annual reports.

According to the 1921 Order of Council, reproduced by the National Archives of Australia, the Department was responsible for:

- The Administration of the Quarantine Act
- The investigation of the causes of disease and death; the establishment and control of laboratories for this purpose
- The control of the Commonwealth Serum Laboratories and the commercial distribution of the products manufactured in these Laboratories
- The methods of prevention of disease
- The collection of sanitary data and the investigation of all factors affecting health in industries
- The education of the public in matters of public health
- The administration of any subsidy made by the Commonwealth with the object of assisting any effort made by any State Government or public authority directed towards the eradication, prevention or control of any disease
- The conducting of campaigns of prevention of disease in which more than one State is interested
- The administrative control of the Australian Institute of Tropical Medicine
- The administrative control of infectious disease amongst discharged members of the Australian Imperial Force
- Generally, to inspire and co-ordinate public health measures
- Any other functions which may be assigned to it

== Structure ==
The Department was an Australian Public Service department, staffed by officials who were responsible to the Minister for Health.
