= Andrew Refshauge =

Australian politician

The Honourable Andrew Refshauge

13th Deputy Premier of New South Wales
- In office 4 April 1995 – 3 August 2005
- Premier: Bob Carr
- Preceded by: Ian Armstrong
- Succeeded by: John Watkins

Treasurer of New South Wales
- In office 21 January 2005 – 3 August 2005
- Premier: Bob Carr
- Preceded by: Michael Egan
- Succeeded by: Morris Iemma

Minister for Health
- In office 4 April 1995 – 8 April 1999
- Premier: Bob Carr
- Preceded by: Ron Phillips
- Succeeded by: Craig Knowles

Minister for Aboriginal Affairs
- In office 4 April 1995 – 3 August 2005
- Premier: Bob Carr
- Preceded by: Jim Longley
- Succeeded by: Milton Orkopoulos

Minister for Education and Training
- In office 2 April 2003 – 21 January 2005
- Premier: Bob Carr
- Preceded by: John Watkins
- Succeeded by: Carmel Tebbutt

Member of the New South Wales Parliament for Marrickville
- In office 22 October 1983 – 10 August 2005
- Preceded by: Tom Cahill
- Succeeded by: Carmel Tebbutt

Personal details
- Born: 16 January 1949 (age 77) Melbourne, Victoria, Australia
- Party: Labor Party
- Relations: Sir William Refshauge (father)
- Parent(s): William Refshauge and Helen Allwright
- Education: University of Sydney
- Profession: Physician

Andrew John Refshauge (born 16 January 1949) is a former Australian politician who was Deputy Premier of New South Wales from 1995 to 2005, a member of the New South Wales Legislative Assembly between 1983 and 2005, and a senior minister in the Carr ministry.

== Background and early career ==
Refshauge was born in Melbourne, the son of Major General Sir William Refshauge AC CBE ED who later became Honorary Physician to Queen Elizabeth II and Director-General of the Commonwealth Department of Health. He has three brothers and one sister. One brother, Richard Refshauge, was a Judge of the ACT Supreme Court. His sister, Kathryn Refshauge, is the Dean of the Faculty of Health Sciences at the University of Sydney.

Educated at Scotch College, Melbourne, Refshauge studied medicine at the University of Sydney, and after graduating, worked in NSW hospitals and later at the Aboriginal Medical Service in Redfern.

He helped establish Aboriginal Medical Services in Wilcannia and Kempsey.

== Political career ==
Angered by the dismissal of the Whitlam Government, Refshauge joined the Australian Labor Party. In 1983 he was elected to the New South Wales Legislative Assembly as the member for Marrickville on the same day that Bob Carr was elected the member for Maroubra in by-elections. He served in a variety of portfolios, as well as rising to be the leader of the left faction of the party, Deputy Leader of the Opposition in 1988, and Deputy Premier in 1995 following the election of the Carr government.

Refshauge was the Legislative Assembly representative on the Senate of the University of Sydney between 1987 and 1988 and was the Deputy Leader of the Opposition between 11 April 1988 and 4 April 1995. Prior to entering politics he was a member of the Aboriginal Affairs Policy Committee (1981–1986). Refshauge was a delegate to Labor's State Conference (1984–2005); an executive committee member of the H.V. Evatt Memorial Foundation; a board member of the Mandela Foundation; and a Fellow of the Senate of the University of Sydney (1983–1986).

During his term in parliament, Refshauge served as minister between 1995 and 2005 in portfolios covering Health, Aboriginal Affairs, Urban Affairs and Planning, Housing, Education and Training, State Development and as Treasurer.

Refshauge announced his resignation from Parliament, as Deputy Premier and from the ministry in August 2005, a few days after Bob Carr announced his retirement as Premier and from Parliament. Refshauge originally had planned to retire at the 2007 election but was prompted to go earlier with Carr's retirement and a request by the replacement premier, Morris Iemma that Refshauge stand aside to allow for a new Deputy Premier so that there could be a new leadership team.

Bob and I got in [to Parliament] on the same day. Maybe our replacement should come in on the same day too. I've decided that the time is right to move on to other things. But the time is right, I have decided it's right to leave.

— Andrew Refshauge, announcing his retirement from politics, 2 August 2005.

== Career after politics ==
Refshauge presently holds a number of senior community leadership roles, including the Chairman of CareFlight (NSW), since December 2007; a director of Family Care Medical Services, since 2007; a director of the Aged Care Standards Accreditation Agency, since 2008 and chair since 1 July 2012; and the Chair of the Investment Committee of the Aboriginal Land Council of New South Wales, since 2008.

He has previously served in a range of other community roles, including the Chair of the Australian Institute of Health and Welfare; a director of the Prince of Wales Medical Research Institute, later to become Neuroscience Research Australia; a member of the Foundation for Research and Treatment of Alcoholism and Drug Dependence; and a director of the Family Care Medical Services.

New South Wales Legislative Assembly
| Preceded by Tom Cahill | Member for Marrickville; 1983–2005 | Succeeded by Carmel Tebbutt |
Political offices
| Preceded by Ian Armstrong | Deputy Premier of New South Wales; 1995–2005 | Succeeded by John Watkins |
| Preceded by Ron Phillips | Minister for Health; 1995–1999 | Succeeded by Craig Knowles |
| Preceded by Jim Longley | Minister for Aboriginal Affairs; 1995–2005 | Succeeded by Milton Orkopoulos |
| Preceded by Craig Knowles | Minister for Urban Affairs and Planning; 1999–2001 | Succeeded by Craig Knowles |
| Preceded by Craig Knowles | Minister for Planning; 2001–2003 | Succeeded by Craig Knowles |
| Preceded by Craig Knowles | Minister for Housing; 1999–2003 | Succeeded by Carl Scully |
| Preceded by John Watkins | Minister for Education and Training; 2003–2005 | Succeeded by Carmel Tebbutt |
| Preceded by Michael Egan | Minister for State Development; 2005 | Succeeded by John Watkins |
| Preceded by Michael Egan | Treasurer of New South Wales; 2005 | Succeeded by Morris Iemma |
