= Electoral district of Marrickville =

Former state electoral district of New South Wales, Australia

Marrickville New South Wales—Legislative Assembly
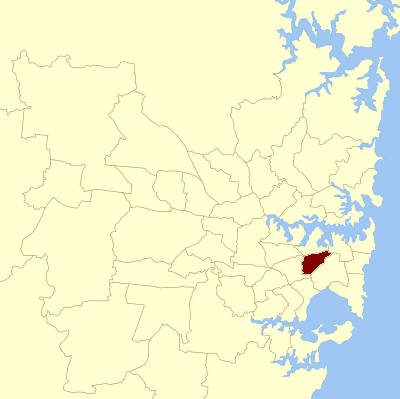
- Location within Sydney.
- State: New South Wales
- Dates current: 1894–1920; 1927–2015
- Namesake: Marrickville

Marrickville was an electoral district of the Legislative Assembly in the Australian state of New South Wales. It was an urban electorate in Sydney's inner west, centred on the suburb of Marrickville from which it took its name. At the time of its abolition it also included the suburbs of Camperdown, Darlington, Enmore, Lewisham, Newtown, Petersham, Stanmore and parts of Dulwich Hill and Erskineville as well as the University of Sydney.

The Marrickville electoral district was abolished prior to the 2015 state election, split between two new districts: Newtown and Summer Hill.

== History ==
Multi-member constituencies were abolished in 1894 and the district was created, along with Newtown-Camperdown, Newtown-Erskine and Newtown-St Peters to replace the then four member electorate of Newtown.

Marrickville was one of the more left-leaning electorates in the Sydney area. It had traditionally been an ALP stronghold, but had become more competitive from the early 2000s, with the Greens coming second and making the two-party preferred count. The Liberal Party did not feature in the final two-candidate count from 1991 to the seat’s final election in 2011, beaten in 1995 by the short lived single issue party No Aircraft Noise and after that by the Greens.

Labor first won the seat in 1910 in the person of Thomas Crawford. In 1916, he joined other pro-conscription Labor MPs in forming the Nationalist Party of Australia. Crawford was defeated in 1917 by Labor's Carlo Lazzarini, the first member of the NSW parliament with an Italian name. Lazzarini held it until the seat was abolished in 1920. He served for the next seven years in the multi-member electorate of Western Suburbs. Marrickville was recreated in 1927 with the reintroduction of single-member electorates. Lazzarini was reelected as the member for this seat, and held it until his death in 1952.

The seat was then held for twenty years by Norm Ryan, who for part of that time was Minister for Public Works and oversaw the building of the Sydney Opera House. After being elected 7 times, he stood aside for fellow ALP member Tom Cahill (the son of former premier Joseph Cahill), who held the seat until his death in 1983. The resulting by-election was won by Andrew Refshauge, who was the deputy premier from 4 April 1995 until his resignation on 10 August 2005. At the general election in 2003, Refshauge won with a 10.7% two party preferred majority over Greens candidate Colin Hesse.

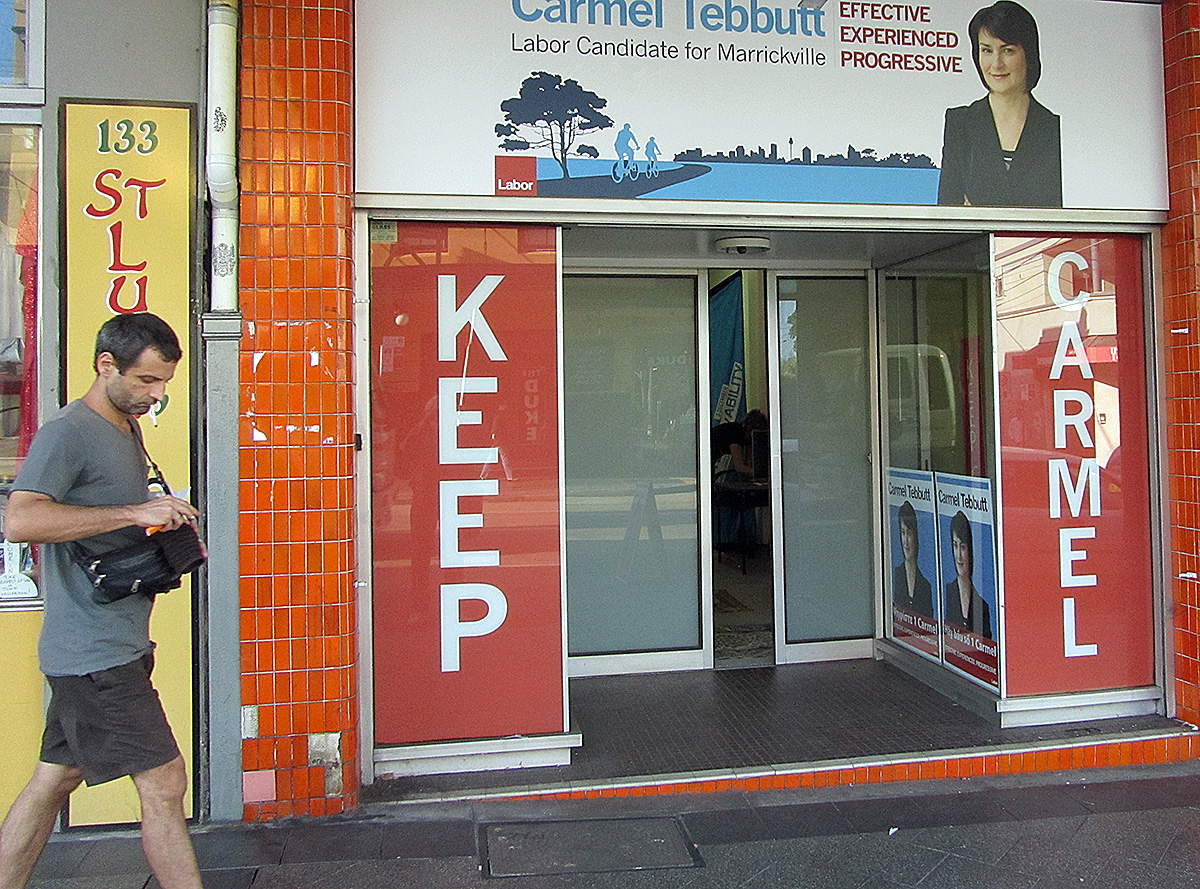
Labor office of Carmel Tebbutt.

Refshauge's retirement in 2005 sparked another by-election on 17 September, held simultaneously with by-elections in Macquarie Fields and Maroubra. While the Liberal Party did not field a candidate, the ALP faced a strong challenger in the Deputy Mayor of Marrickville, Sam Byrne, running as a Greens candidate. The ALP subsequently drafted Education Minister Carmel Tebbutt, who was then a member of the Legislative Council, as their candidate, as she was seen to be the best chance of holding the seat. Despite Tebbutt's profile, she faced significant challenges from Byrne, but ultimately won out – although the Green vote was the highest in Australian history at that time. Tebbutt retained the seat in the 2007 and 2011 state elections, though her majority was successively reduced. Tebbutt was married to future Prime Minister Anthony Albanese, the member for the federal electorate of Grayndler; most of Marrickville is located in Grayndler.

== Members ==
First incarnation (1894–1920)
Member	Party	Term
Francis McLean	Free Trade	1894–1901
Richard McCoy	Liberal Reform	1901–1910
Thomas Crawford	Labor	1910–1916
Thomas Crawford	Nationalist	1916–1917
Carlo Lazzarini	Labor	1917–1920
Second incarnation (1927–2015)
Member	Party	Term
Carlo Lazzarini	Labor	1927–1938
Carlo Lazzarini	Industrial Labor	1938–1941
Carlo Lazzarini	Labor	1941–1952
Norm Ryan	Labor	1953–1973
Tom Cahill	Labor	1973–1983
Andrew Refshauge	Labor	1983–2005
Carmel Tebbutt	Labor	2005–2015

== Election results ==
2011 New South Wales state election: Marrickville
Party	Candidate	Votes	%	±%
Labor	Carmel Tebbutt	17,413	38.1	−8.5
Greens	Fiona Byrne	16,395	35.9	+3.3
Liberal	Rosana Tyler	8,714	19.1	+6.5
Socialist Alliance	Pip Hinman	860	1.9	+0.3
Independent	Paul Quealy	817	1.8	+1.8
Socialist Equality	James Cogan	572	1.3	+1.3
Christian Democrats	Kylie Laurence	531	1.2	−0.3
Family First	Jimmy Liem	395	0.9	+0.9
Total formal votes		45,697	97.1	+0.2
Informal votes		1,377	2.9	−0.2
Turnout		47,074	90.2	+0.3
Notional two-party-preferred count
Labor	Carmel Tebbutt	24,777	70.4	−10.9
Liberal	Rosana Tyler	10,435	29.6	+10.9
Two-candidate-preferred result
Labor	Carmel Tebbutt	19,046	50.9	−6.6
Greens	Fiona Byrne	18,370	49.1	+6.6
Labor hold		Swing	−6.6	
