= Electoral results for the district of Castlereagh =

Election results for Castlereagh, New South Wales, Australia

Castlereagh, an electoral district of the Legislative Assembly in the Australian state of New South Wales had two incarnations, from 1904 until 1920 and from 1927 until 1991.

Election	Member	Party
1904	Hugh Macdonald	Labour
1906 by	John Treflé	Labour
1907	John Treflé	Labour
1910	John Treflé	Labour
1913	John Treflé	Labour
1915 by	Guy Arkins	Labor
1917	Guy Arkins	Nationalist
Election	Member	Party
1927	Harold Thorby	Country
1930	Joseph Clark	Labor
1932	Alfred Yeo	Country
1935	Alfred Yeo	Country
1938	Alfred Yeo	Country
1941	Jack Renshaw	Labor
1944	Jack Renshaw	Labor
1947	Jack Renshaw	Labor
1950	Jack Renshaw	Labor
1953	Jack Renshaw	Labor
1956	Jack Renshaw	Labor
1959	Jack Renshaw	Labor
1962	Jack Renshaw	Labor
1965	Jack Renshaw	Labor
1968	Jack Renshaw	Labor
1971	Jack Renshaw	Labor
1973	Jack Renshaw	Labor
1976	Jack Renshaw	Labor
1978	Jack Renshaw	Labor
1980 by	Jim Curran	Labor
1981	Roger Wotton	National
1984	Roger Wotton	National
1988	Roger Wotton	National

== Election results ==
=== Elections in the 1980s ===
==== 1988 ====
1988 New South Wales state election: Castlereagh
Party	Candidate	Votes	%	±%
National	Roger Wotton	19,482	67.0	+11.1
Labor	Michael Williams	7,425	25.6	−13.1
Democrats	Peter Lyons	2,151	7.4	+5.7
Total formal votes		29,058	97.8	−1.1
Informal votes		662	2.2	+1.1
Turnout		29,720	93.1	
Two-party-preferred result
National	Roger Wotton	20,515	71.9	+13.3
Labor	Michael Williams	8,008	28.1	−13.3
National hold		Swing	+13.3	

==== 1984 ====
1984 New South Wales state election: Castlereagh
Party	Candidate	Votes	%	±%
National	Roger Wotton	17,931	56.0	+2.6
Labor	Jim Curran	13,158	41.1	−5.5
Democrats	Anne Graham	900	2.8	+2.8
Total formal votes		31,989	99.0	+0.5
Informal votes		325	1.0	−0.5
Turnout		32,314	93.3	+1.1
Two-party-preferred result
National	Roger Wotton		57.3	+3.9
Labor	Jim Curran		42.7	−3.9
National hold		Swing	+3.9	

==== 1981 ====
1981 New South Wales state election: Castlereagh
Party	Candidate	Votes	%	±%
National Country	Roger Wotton	16,636	53.4	
Labor	Jim Curran	14,529	46.6	
Total formal votes		31,165	98.5	
Informal votes		461	1.5	
Turnout		31,626	92.2	
National Country notional hold		Swing	−0.9	

The sitting member was Jim Curran (Labor), however Castlereagh had become notionally held by National Country due to the redistribution.

==== 1980 by-election ====
1980 Castlereagh by-election Saturday 23 February
Party	Candidate	Votes	%	±%
Labor	Jim Curran	9,327	51.9	−5.0
Country	John Hickmott	8,651	48.1	+5.0
Total formal votes		17,978	99.3	+0.8
Informal votes		134	0.7	−0.8
Turnout		18,112	83.0	−9.3
Labor hold		Swing	−5.0	

Jack Renshaw (Labor) resigned.

=== Elections in the 1970s ===
==== 1978 ====
1978 New South Wales state election: Castlereagh
Party	Candidate	Votes	%	±%
Labor	Jack Renshaw	11,173	56.2	+5.0
National Country	John Hickmott	7,688	38.7	+1.7
Liberal	John Browne	1,020	5.1	−6.7
Total formal votes		19,881	98.5	−0.6
Informal votes		294	1.5	+0.6
Turnout		20,175	92.3	−1.4
Two-party-preferred result
Labor	Jack Renshaw	11,320	56.9	+4.6
National Country	John Hickmott	8,561	43.1	−4.6
Labor hold		Swing	+4.6	

==== 1976 ====
1976 New South Wales state election: Castlereagh
Party	Candidate	Votes	%	±%
Labor	Jack Renshaw	10,151	51.2	+0.9
Country	Albert Green	7,346	37.0	+1.1
Liberal	John Browne	2,349	11.8	−2.0
Total formal votes		19,846	99.1	+0.6
Informal votes		172	0.9	−0.6
Turnout		20,018	93.7	+1.6
Two-party-preferred result
Labor	Jack Renshaw	10,386	52.3	+1.0
Country	Albert Green	9,460	47.7	−1.0
Labor hold		Swing	+1.0	

==== 1973 ====
1973 New South Wales state election: Castlereagh
Party	Candidate	Votes	%	±%
Labor	Jack Renshaw	9,446	50.3	−6.1
Country	Albert Green	6,748	35.9	+14.4
Liberal	Lionel Gray	2,586	13.8	−2.8
Total formal votes		18,780	98.5	
Informal votes		280	1.5	
Turnout		19,060	92.1	
Two-party-preferred result
Labor	Jack Renshaw	9,640	51.3	−7.4
Country	Albert Green	9,140	48.7	+7.4
Labor hold		Swing	−7.4	

==== 1971 ====
1971 New South Wales state election: Castlereagh
Party	Candidate	Votes	%	±%
Labor	Jack Renshaw	9,359	56.4	+3.2
Country	Albert Green	3,575	21.5	−3.0
Liberal	Bruce Fry	2,756	16.6	−5.7
Democratic Labor	John Gough	904	5.5	+5.5
Total formal votes		16,594	98.5	
Informal votes		245	1.5	
Turnout		16,839	87.1	
Two-party-preferred result
Labor	Jack Renshaw	9,733	58.7	+3.9
Country	Albert Green	6,861	41.3	−3.9
Labor hold		Swing	+3.9	

=== Elections in the 1960s ===
==== 1968 ====
1968 New South Wales state election: Castlereagh
Party	Candidate	Votes	%	±%
Labor	Jack Renshaw	9,491	53.2	−0.8
Country	Doug Moppett	4,359	24.5	+3.3
Liberal	Allan Connell	3,979	22.3	+1.7
Total formal votes		17,829	98.4	
Informal votes		283	1.6	
Turnout		18,112	93.8	
Two-party-preferred result
Labor	Jack Renshaw	9,770	54.8	−2.4
Country	Doug Moppett	8,059	45.2	+2.4
Labor hold		Swing	−2.4	

==== 1965 ====
1965 New South Wales state election: Castlereagh
Party	Candidate	Votes	%	±%
Labor	Jack Renshaw	9,766	54.0	+1.0
Country	Doug Moppett	3,823	21.2	+4.0
Liberal	William Waterford	3,728	20.6	−7.3
Independent	Angus Campbell	756	4.2	+4.2
Total formal votes		18,073	98.9	0.0
Informal votes		204	1.1	0.0
Turnout		18,277	94.3	+0.6
Two-party-preferred result
Labor	Jack Renshaw	10,335	57.2	+2.6
Country	Doug Moppett	7,738	42.8	−2.6
Labor hold		Swing	+2.6	

==== 1962 ====
1962 New South Wales state election: Castlereagh
Party	Candidate	Votes	%	±%
Labor	Jack Renshaw	9,353	53.0	+0.2
Liberal	William Waterford	4,933	27.9	+27.9
Country	Calverley Brown	3,031	17.2	−30.0
Democratic Labor	Violet Amor	334	1.9	+1.9
Total formal votes		17,651	98.9	
Informal votes		202	1.1	
Turnout		17,853	93.7	
Two-party-preferred result
Labor	Jack Renshaw	9,632	54.6	+1.8
Liberal	William Waterford	8,019	45.4	+45.4
Labor hold		Swing	+1.8	

=== Elections in the 1950s ===
==== 1959 ====
1959 New South Wales state election: Castlereagh
Party	Candidate	Votes	%	±%
Labor	Jack Renshaw	9,344	52.8	
Country	Calverley Brown	8,346	47.2	
Total formal votes		17,690	99.0	
Informal votes		172	1.0	
Turnout		17,862	91.9	
Labor hold		Swing		

==== 1956 ====
1956 New South Wales state election: Castlereagh
Party	Candidate	Votes	%	±%
Labor	Jack Renshaw	9,388	58.7	−4.1
Country	Norman Brown	6,599	41.3	+4.1
Total formal votes		15,987	99.2	+0.5
Informal votes		134	0.8	−0.5
Turnout		16,121	84.8	−6.0
Labor hold		Swing	−4.1	

==== 1953 ====
1953 New South Wales state election: Castlereagh
Party	Candidate	Votes	%	±%
Labor	Jack Renshaw	10,147	62.8	
Country	Keith Sullivan	6,023	37.2	
Total formal votes		16,170	98.7	
Informal votes		220	1.3	
Turnout		16,390	90.8	
Labor hold		Swing		

==== 1950 ====
1950 New South Wales state election: Castlereagh
Party	Candidate	Votes	%	±%
Labor	Jack Renshaw	7,479	53.0	
Country	Noel Knight	4,589	32.5	
Liberal	John Campbell	1,904	13.5	
Country	Edward Langbien	133	0.9	
Total formal votes		14,105	99.3	
Informal votes		93	0.7	
Turnout		14,198	84.6	
Two-party-preferred result
Labor	Jack Renshaw		54.0 (Note: Two party preferred vote was estimated.)	
Country	Noel Knight		46.0	
Labor hold		Swing		

Castlereagh was expanded to include part of Cobar, including the towns of Bourke and Nyngan.

=== Elections in the 1940s ===
==== 1947 ====
1947 New South Wales state election: Castlereagh
Party	Candidate	Votes	%	±%
Labor	Jack Renshaw	6,961	54.9	−6.4
Country	Richard Powell	5,724	45.1	+6.4
Total formal votes		12,685	99.2	+1.3
Informal votes		102	0.8	−1.3
Turnout		12,787	93.8	+7.0
Labor hold		Swing	−6.4	

==== 1944 ====
1944 New South Wales state election: Castlereagh
Party	Candidate	Votes	%	±%
Labor	Jack Renshaw	7,254	61.3	+12.1
Country	Alfred Yeo	4,574	38.7	−0.9
Total formal votes		11,828	97.9	−0.7
Informal votes		253	2.1	+0.7
Turnout		12,081	86.8	−4.4
Labor hold		Swing	+2.2	

==== 1941 ====
1941 New South Wales state election: Castlereagh
Party	Candidate	Votes	%	±%
Labor	Jack Renshaw	6,563	49.2	
Country	Harold Campbell	5,278	39.6	
Independent Labor	John Smithers	1,497	11.2	
Total formal votes		13,338	98.6	
Informal votes		185	1.4	
Turnout		13,523	91.2	
Two-party-preferred result
Labor	Jack Renshaw	7,899	59.2	
Country	Harold Campbell	5,439	40.8	
Labor gain from Country		Swing		

The sitting member for Castlereagh, Alfred Yeo (Country), was concerned that the redistribution had made it a Labor seat and he unsuccessfully contested Liverpool Plains.

=== Elections in the 1930s ===
==== 1938 ====
1938 New South Wales state election: Castlereagh
Party	Candidate	Votes	%	±%
Country	Alfred Yeo	6,821	51.4	−0.2
Labor	Les Murphy	6,454	48.6	+0.2
Total formal votes		13,275	98.1	−0.3
Informal votes		260	1.9	+0.3
Turnout		13,535	94.1	−0.9
Country hold		Swing	−0.2	

==== 1935 ====
1935 New South Wales state election: Castlereagh
Party	Candidate	Votes	%	±%
Country	Alfred Yeo	6,944	51.6	+1.0
Labor (NSW)	Joseph Clark	6,517	48.4	+7.1
Total formal votes		13,461	98.4	−0.3
Informal votes		218	1.6	+0.3
Turnout		13,679	95.0	−1.2
Country hold		Swing	N/A	

==== 1932 ====
1932 New South Wales state election: Castlereagh
Party	Candidate	Votes	%	±%
Country	Alfred Yeo	6,635	50.6	+8.6
Labor (NSW)	Joseph Clark	5,420	41.3	−14.5
Federal Labor	Wilfred Turnbull	1,061	8.1	+8.1
Total formal votes		13,116	98.7	+0.9
Informal votes		172	1.3	−0.9
Turnout		13,288	96.2	+2.2
Country gain from Labor (NSW)		Swing	N/A	

- Preferences were not distributed.

==== 1930 ====
1930 New South Wales state election: Castlereagh
Party	Candidate	Votes	%	±%
Labor	Joseph Clark	6,901	55.8	
Country	Robert Stanley	5,194	42.0	
Independent Country	Frederick Sargant	264	2.1	
Total formal votes		12,359	97.8	
Informal votes		278	2.2	
Turnout		12,637	94.0	
Labor hold		Swing		

The sitting member was Harold Thorby (Country) who unsuccessfully contested Dubbo.

=== Elections in the 1920s ===
==== 1927 ====
1927 New South Wales state election: Castlereagh
Party	Candidate	Votes	%	±%
Country	Harold Thorby	6,984	52.4	
Labor	Joseph Clark (defeated)	6,353	47.6	
Total formal votes		13,337	99.1	
Informal votes		123	0.9	
Turnout		13,460	84.8	
Country win		(new seat)		

District recreated

==== 1920 - 1927 ====
District abolished

=== Elections in the 1910s ===
==== 1917 ====
1917 New South Wales state election: Castlereagh
Party	Candidate	Votes	%	±%
Nationalist	Guy Arkins	3,336	53.5	+53.5
Labor	Joseph Clark	2,902	46.5	−5.9
Total formal votes		6,238	98.8	+1.8
Informal votes		78	1.2	−1.8
Turnout		6,316	61.8	−9.2
Member changed to Nationalist from Labor				

The sitting member Guy Arkins was expelled from Labor in the November 1916 Labor split over conscription.

==== 1915 by-election ====
1915 Castlereagh by-election Saturday 20 February
Party	Candidate	Votes	%	±%
Labor	Guy Arkins	3,214	57.6	+5.2
Farmers and Settlers	Harold Blackett	2,369	42.4	−5.2
Total formal votes		5,583	100.0	+3.0
Informal votes		0	0.0	−3.0
Turnout		5,583	52.8 (Note: based on an electoral roll of 10,579 at the 1913 election)	−18.2
Labor hold		Swing	+5.2	

John Treflé (Labor) died.

==== 1913 ====
1913 New South Wales state election: Castlereagh
Party	Candidate	Votes	%	±%
Labor	John Treflé	3,815	52.4	
Farmers and Settlers	Harold Blackett (Note: Also endorsed by Liberal Reform.)	3,466	47.6	
Total formal votes		7,281	97.0	
Informal votes		228	3.0	
Turnout		7,509	71.0	
Labor hold				

==== 1910 ====
1910 New South Wales state election: The Castlereagh
Party	Candidate	Votes	%	±%
Labour	John Treflé	3,410	58.4	
Liberal Reform	William Donnelly	2,434	41.6	
Total formal votes		5,844	98.0	
Informal votes		121	2.0	
Turnout		5,565	61.7	
Labour hold				

=== Elections in the 1900s ===
==== 1907 ====
1907 New South Wales state election: The Castlereagh
Party	Candidate	Votes	%	±%
Labour	John Treflé	2,854	56.6	
Independent Liberal	Donald Fletcher	2,186	43.4	
Total formal votes		5,040	96.5	
Informal votes		181	3.5	
Turnout		5,221	65.4	
Labour hold				

==== 1906 by-election ====
1906 The Castlereagh by-election Saturday 24 November
Party	Candidate	Votes	%	±%
Labour	John Treflé	1,960	54.4	
Liberal Reform	Patrick Barry	1,632	45.3	
Independent	Donald Fletcher	12	0.3	
Total formal votes		3,604	98.5	−0.1
Informal votes		54	1.5	+0.1
Turnout		3,658	50.5 (Note: based on an electoral roll of 7,248 at the 1904 election.)	−1.6
Labour hold				

Hugh Macdonald (Labour) died.

==== 1904 ====
1904 New South Wales state election: The Castlereagh
Party	Candidate	Votes	%	±%
Labour	Hugh Macdonald	1,867	50.2	
Liberal Reform	William A'Beckett	1,853	49.8	
Total formal votes		3,720	98.6	
Informal votes		53	1.4	
Turnout		3,773	52.1	
Labour win		(new seat)		

The Castlereagh was a new seat consisting of the abolished seat of Coonamble and part of the abolished seat of Dubbo. The member for Coonamble was Hugh Macdonald (Labour). The member for Dubbo was Simeon Phillips (Liberal Reform) who stayed with the majority of the seat and unsuccessfully contested The Macquarie.
