= Electoral results for the district of Wammerawa =

Election results for Wammerawa, New South Wales, Australia

Wammerawa, an electoral district of the Legislative Assembly in the Australian state of New South Wales, was created in 1920 and abolished in 1927.

| Election | Member | Party | Member | Party | Member | Party |
|---|---|---|---|---|---|---|
| 1920 | Joseph Clark | Labor | Bill Dunn | Labor | William Ashford | Nationalist |
| 1922 | Harold Thorby | Progressive | Bill Dunn | Labor | William Ashford | Independent |
| 1922 re-count | Harold Thorby | Progressive | Bill Dunn | Labor | Joseph Clark | Labor |
| 1925 | Harold Thorby | Progressive | Bill Dunn | Labor | Joseph Clark | Labor |

== Election results ==
=== Elections in the 1920s ===
==== 1925 ====
1925 New South Wales state election: Wammerawa
| Party | Candidate | Votes | % | ±% |
|---|---|---|---|---|
| Quota | | 6,717 | | |
| Labor | Bill Dunn (elected 1) | 8,680 | 32.3 | +6.2 |
| Labor | Joseph Clark (elected 2) | 5,078 | 18.9 | +0.6 |
| Labor | John Ritchie | 1,352 | 5.0 | +5.0 |
| Progressive | Harold Thorby (elected 3) | 4,664 | 17.4 | +6.5 |
| Progressive | Alfred Yeo | 788 | 2.9 | +2.9 |
| Progressive | Samuel Armstrong | 721 | 2.7 | +2.7 |
| Nationalist | Harold Blackett | 3,367 | 12.5 | +12.5 |
| Nationalist | John Macdonald | 1,566 | 5.8 | +0.8 |
| Nationalist | Henry Buttsworth | 650 | 2.4 | +2.4 |
| Total formal votes | | 26,866 | 97.0 | +0.7 |
| Informal votes | | 823 | 3.0 | −0.7 |
| Turnout | | 27,689 | 72.9 | +1.6 |
Party total votes
| Labor | | 15,110 | 56.2 | +8.7 |
| Progressive | | 6,173 | 23.0 | −6.2 |
| Nationalist | | 5,583 | 20.8 | +8.6 |

==== 1922 re-count ====
The returning officer declared that William Ashford (Independent) had been elected 3rd at the 1922 election. Joseph Clark lodged a petition that alleged the returning officer had made an error in the way he distributed surplus votes after the election of Harold Thorby. The Elections and Qualifications Committee agreed and after re-counting the votes declared that Clark had been elected.

==== 1922 ====
1922 New South Wales state election: Wammerawa
| Party | Candidate | Votes | % | ±% |
|---|---|---|---|---|
| Quota | | 6,571 | | |
| Labor | Bill Dunn (elected 1) | 6,854 | 26.1 | −13.6 |
| Labor | Joseph Clark (defeated) | 4,810 | 18.3 | +8.8 |
| Labor | William Webster | 821 | 3.1 | −1.1 |
| Progressive | Harold Thorby (elected 2) | 2,855 | 10.9 | +0.4 |
| Progressive | Gordon Wilkins | 2,522 | 9.6 | +9.6 |
| Progressive | George Oram | 930 | 3.5 | +3.5 |
| Progressive | James Berryman | 726 | 2.8 | +2.8 |
| Progressive | Edward Scully | 366 | 1.4 | +1.4 |
| Progressive | Edward Kater | 266 | 1.0 | +1.0 |
| Nationalist | Percy Shortland | 1,386 | 5.3 | +5.3 |
| Nationalist | John Macdonald | 1,314 | 5.0 | +5.0 |
| Nationalist | John Wark | 516 | 2.0 | +2.0 |
| Independent | William Ashford (elected 3) | 2,891 | 11.0 | +11.0 |
| Independent | Arthur Heany | 23 | 0.1 | +0.1 |
| Total formal votes | | 26,280 | 96.3 | +4.2 |
| Informal votes | | 1,001 | 3.7 | −4.2 |
| Turnout | | 27,281 | 71.3 | +8.0 |
Party total votes
| Labor | | 12,485 | 47.5 | −5.9 |
| Progressive | | 7,665 | 29.2 | +8.3 |
| Nationalist | | 3,216 | 12.2 | −12.0 |
| Independent | William Ashford | 2,891 | 11.0 | +11.0 |
| Independent | Arthur Heany | 23 | 0.1 | +0.1 |

==== 1920 ====
1920 New South Wales state election: Wammerawa
| Party | Candidate | Votes | % | ±% |
|---|---|---|---|---|
| Quota | | 5,610 | | |
| Labor | Bill Dunn (elected 1) | 8,912 | 39.7 | |
| Labor | Joseph Clark (elected 3) | 2,138 | 9.5 | |
| Labor | William Webster | 931 | 4.2 | |
| Nationalist | William Ashford (elected 2) | 5,166 | 23.0 | |
| Nationalist | Sidney Skuthorpe | 269 | 1.2 | |
| Progressive | Harold Thorby | 2,355 | 10.5 | |
| Progressive | Neil McLennan | 1,206 | 5.4 | |
| Progressive | William Harris | 1,137 | 5.1 | |
| Independent | Sydney Webb | 178 | 0.8 | |
| Independent | William Kelk | 109 | 0.5 | |
| Independent | Edwin Utley | 37 | 0.2 | |
| Total formal votes | | 22,438 | 92.1 | |
| Informal votes | | 1,920 | 7.9 | |
| Turnout | | 24,358 | 63.3 | |
Party total votes
| Labor | | 11,981 | 53.4 | |
| Nationalist | | 5,435 | 24.2 | |
| Progressive | | 4,698 | 20.9 | |
| Independent | Sydney Webb | 178 | 0.8 | |
| Independent | William Kelk | 109 | 0.5 | |
| Independent | Edwin Utley | 37 | 0.2 | |
