= 1915 Castlereagh state by-election =

Election result for Castlereagh, New South Wales, Australia

- February 20, 1915
- Registered: 10,579
- Turnout: 5,583 (52.8%)
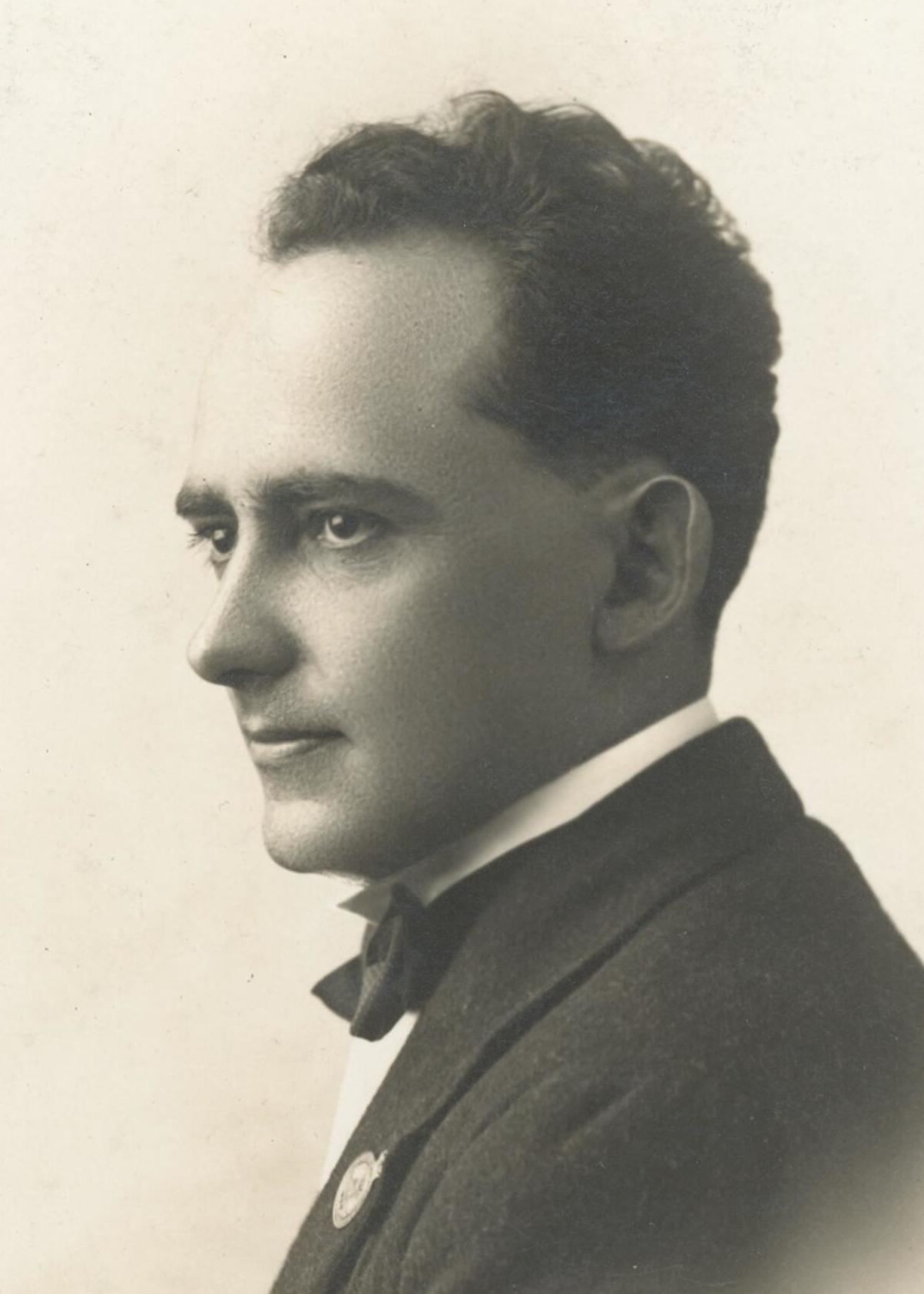
		F&S
Candidate	Guy Arkins	Harold Blackett
Party	Labor	Farmers and Settlers
Popular vote	3,214	2,369
Percentage	57.6%	42.4%
Swing	▲5.2%	▼5.2%
Member of Parliament before election
John Treflé
Labor
Member of Parliament after election
Guy Arkins
Labor

A by-election was held for the New South Wales Legislative Assembly electorate of Castlereagh on 20 February 1915 following the death of John Treflé (Labor).

== Dates ==
Date	Event
11 January 1915	John Treflé died.
28 January 1915	Writ of election issued by the Speaker of the Legislative Assembly.
6 February 1915	Nominations
20 February 1915	Polling day, between the hours of 8 am and 6 pm
9 March 1915	Return of writ

== Result ==
1915 Castlereagh by-election Saturday 20 February
Party	Candidate	Votes	%	±%
Labor	Guy Arkins	3,214	57.6	+5.2
Farmers and Settlers	Harold Blackett	2,369	42.4	−5.2
Total formal votes		5,583	100.0	+3.0
Informal votes		0	0.0	−3.0
Turnout		5,583	52.8 (Note: based on an electoral roll of 10,579 at the 1913 election)	−18.2
Labor hold		Swing	+5.2	

== See also ==
- Electoral results for the district of Castlereagh
- List of New South Wales state by-elections
