= Electoral results for the district of Coonamble =

Election results for Coonamble, New South Wales, Australia

Coonamble, an electoral district of the Legislative Assembly in the Australian state of New South Wales was created in 1894 and abolished in 1904.

Election	Member	Party
1894	Hugh Macdonald	Labour
1895	Hugh Macdonald	Labour
1898	Hugh Macdonald	Labour
1901	Hugh Macdonald	Labour

== Election results ==
=== Elections in the 1900s ===
==== 1901 ====
1901 New South Wales state election: Coonamble
Party	Candidate	Votes	%	±%
Labour	Hugh Macdonald	895	61.6	
Ind. Progressive	John Reddan	557	38.4	
Total formal votes		1,452	99.9	+0.6
Informal votes		2	0.1	−0.6
Turnout		1,454	48.2	−7.0
Labour hold				

=== Elections in the 1890s ===
==== 1898 ====
1898 New South Wales colonial election: Coonamble
Party	Candidate	Votes	%	±%
Labour	Hugh Macdonald	780	55.5	
National Federal	William Alison	625	44.5	
Total formal votes		1,405	99.3	
Informal votes		10	0.7	
Turnout		1,415	55.2	
Labour hold				

==== 1895 ====
1895 New South Wales colonial election: Coonamble
Party	Candidate	Votes	%	±%
Labour	Hugh Macdonald	598	51.4	
Protectionist	George Loughnan	566	48.6	
Total formal votes		1,164	99.3	
Informal votes		8	0.7	
Turnout		1,172	58.1	
Labour hold				

==== 1894 ====
1894 New South Wales colonial election: Coonamble
Party	Candidate	Votes	%	±%
Labour	Hugh Macdonald	780	52.1	
Protectionist	John Hellman	510	34.1	
Ind. Protectionist	John Fisher	206	13.8	
Total formal votes		1,496	98.6	
Informal votes		22	1.5	
Turnout		1,518	74.8	
Labour win		(new seat)		
