= 1906 The Castlereagh state by-election =

Election result for Castlereagh, New South Wales, Australia

A by-election was held for the New South Wales Legislative Assembly electorate of The Castlereagh on 24 November 1906 because of the death of Hugh Macdonald (Labour).

== Dates ==
Date	Event
18 October 1906	Hugh Macdonald died.
24 October 1906	Writ of election issued by the Speaker of the Legislative Assembly.
14 November 1906	Nominations
24 November 1906	Polling day, between the hours of 8 am and 6 pm
11 December 1906	Return of writ

== Result ==
1906 The Castlereagh by-election Saturday 24 November
Party	Candidate	Votes	%	±%
Labour	John Treflé	1,960	54.4	
Liberal Reform	Patrick Barry	1,632	45.3	
Independent	Donald Fletcher	12	0.3	
Total formal votes		3,604	98.5	−0.1
Informal votes		54	1.5	+0.1
Turnout		3,658	50.5 (Note: based on an electoral roll of 7,248 at the 1904 election.)	−1.6
Labour hold				

== See also ==
- Electoral results for the district of Castlereagh
- List of New South Wales state by-elections
