= Electoral results for the district of Burrendong =

Election result for Burrendong, New South Wales, Australia

Burrendong, an electoral district of the Legislative Assembly in the Australian state of New South Wales was created in 1968 and abolished in 1981.

Election	Member	Party
1968	Roger Wotton	Country
1971	Leo Nott	Labor
1973	Roger Wotton	Country
1976	Roger Wotton	Country
1978	Roger Wotton	Country

== Election results ==
=== Elections in the 1970s ===
==== 1978 ====
1978 New South Wales state election: Burrendong
Party	Candidate	Votes	%	±%
National Country	Roger Wotton	13,614	58.3	+0.4
Labor	Reynold Toyer	9,746	41.7	−0.4
Total formal votes		23,360	98.6	−0.4
Informal votes		338	1.4	+0.4
Turnout		23,698	94.4	0.0
National Country hold		Swing	+0.4	

==== 1976 ====
1976 New South Wales state election: Burrendong
Party	Candidate	Votes	%	±%
Country	Roger Wotton	12,923	57.9	+13.6
Labor	Reynold Toyer	9,399	42.1	−0.7
Total formal votes		22,322	99.0	0.0
Informal votes		232	1.0	0.0
Turnout		22,554	94.4	0.0
Country hold		Swing	+4.1	

==== 1973 ====
1973 New South Wales state election: Burrendong
Party	Candidate	Votes	%	±%
Country	Roger Wotton	9,373	44.3	−3.9
Labor	Leo Nott	9,051	42.8	−9.0
Liberal	Beryl Bowman	2,721	12.9	+12.9
Total formal votes		21,145	99.0	
Informal votes		214	1.0	
Turnout		21,359	94.4	
Two-party-preferred result
Country	Roger Wotton	11,384	53.8	+5.6
Labor	Leo Nott	9,761	46.2	−5.6
Country gain from Labor		Swing	+5.6	

==== 1971 ====
1971 New South Wales state election: Burrendong
Party	Candidate	Votes	%	±%
Labor	Leo Nott	9,576	51.8	+13.4
Country	Roger Wotton	8,925	48.2	+14.5
Total formal votes		18,501	99.0	
Informal votes		194	1.0	
Turnout		18,695	94.3	
Labor gain from Country		Swing	+7.7	

=== Elections in the 1960s ===
==== 1968 ====
1968 New South Wales state election: Burrendong
Party	Candidate	Votes	%	±%
Country	Roger Wotton	7,727	36.7	+10.4
Labor	Paul Khoury	7,448	35.4	−10.2
Liberal	Richard Evans	5,867	27.9	−0.2
Total formal votes		21,042	98.4	
Informal votes		343	1.6	
Turnout		21,385	95.5	
Two-party-preferred result
Country	Roger Wotton	12,389	58.9	+6.1
Labor	Paul Khoury	8,653	41.1	−6.1
Country win		(new seat)		
