= 1980 Castlereagh state by-election =

Election result for Castlereagh, New South Wales, Australia

A by-election was held for the New South Wales Legislative Assembly seat of Castlereagh on 23 February 1980 due to the resignation of Jack Renshaw (Labor).

== Dates ==
Date	Event
29 January 1980	Jack Renshaw resigned.
29 January 1980	Writ of election issued by the Speaker of the Legislative Assembly.
4 February 1980	Day of nomination
23 February 1980	Polling day
10 March 1980	Return of writ

== Result ==
1980 Castlereagh by-election Saturday 23 February
Party	Candidate	Votes	%	±%
Labor	Jim Curran	9,327	51.9	−5.0
Country	John Hickmott	8,651	48.1	+5.0
Total formal votes		17,978	99.3	+0.8
Informal votes		134	0.7	−0.8
Turnout		18,112	83.0	−9.3
Labor hold		Swing	−5.0	

== See also ==
- Electoral results for the district of Castlereagh
- List of New South Wales state by-elections
