= N.S.W. Country Press Co-operative Company, Ltd =

N.S.W. Country Press Co-operative was an organisation founded in 1903 to support the many newspapers in country New South Wales.

== History ==
The first such organisation in Australia was founded in Victoria, and acted largely as an intermediary between advertisers and publishers, canvassing for advertisements, and by the end of 1891 claimed to represent over 60 country newspapers. In those days every town in Australia, no matter how small, had its own newspaper, and most were independent concerns: in some towns the newspaper might be a one-man operation or a family business, and the ability to garner advertising revenue from outside the paper's catchment area would have been an attraction. The Association also represented the newspapers interests in dealing with governments in such matters as public notices, regulations, postage, and supplements or advertising inserts; also lobbying on behalf of the publishers for more liberal libel laws and other legal issues.

It was not until 1903 that a similar organisation was formed in New South Wales, by the NSW Country Press Association, a year later, 1250 shares had been applied for, so the promoters felt confident of registering a Company. Provisional office-holders in a N.S.W. Country Press Association were elected: Thomas Temperley as president; Adams, Gale, and T. M. Shakespeare vice-presidents; Varley, Puddicombe, Leslie, Robinson, Johnston, Codrington, Wickerson, Pinkstone, John Treflé, and Veness as councillors, Shakespeare to act as secretary.

At the first AGM, Thomas Temperley (R. R. Times– for "Richmond River", Ballina), G. H. Varley (Clarence River Examiner), J. C. Leslie (Corowa Free Press), A. Colless (Nepean Times), J. L. Treflé (Temora Independent), J. A. Puddicombe (Grafton Argus) and G. Adams (Albury Banner) were elected directors, and from their number Temperley was elected chairman. T. M. Shakespeare (Grafton Argus and founder of The Lachlander) continued as secretary.

In 1909 Temperley represented country NSW newspapers at the Imperial Press Conference in London. It appears that he then realised the growing importance to newspapers of the cable news services as, on his return, he divested himself of his newspapers and founded the Independent Cable Association in competition with the Australian Cable Association. The Independent Cable Association, which had a head office at 176 Castlereagh Street and offices in London, New York, and Vancouver, using the Pacific cable, owned by the Australian government, broke the monopoly and gave country newspapers access to world news at the same time as, or earlier than, the city newspapers, who had an effective monopoly.

The NSW Country Press Association building, 176 Castlereagh Street, near Park Street, opened in October 1911. In 1912 the Posts and Telegraph office was relocated to the Country Press Association building. Enlarged, the building became headquarters of the (Australian) Country Press Association.
