= The Corowa Free Press =

Australian newspaper

Front page of The Corrowa Free Press, Friday, 7 January 1876.

The Corowa Free Press was a weekly English language newspaper published in Corowa, New South Wales, Australia, between 1875 and 1928.

== History ==
The Corowa Free Press was first launched by James Crauford Leslie (1848–1907) and John William Hutchinson Wyse on 8 October 1875. Leslie was born in Scotland and emigrated to Melbourne, Australia with his family in 1854. In 1874, after being decorated for his involvement in the Maori Wars, he moved to Wahgunyah, Victoria to manage The Chronicle which served the cross-border towns of Wahgunyah and Corowa in New South Wales. After The Chronicle folded in September 1875, Leslie crossed the border to set up The Corowa Free Press. Wyse left the paper in 1880, becoming editor of the Deniliquin "Pastoral Times and Leslie was the sole proprietor until his death on 20 February 1907.

In 1887, Leslie was fined fifty pounds in default of 6 months imprisonment on a charge of criminal libel. In 1900, the NSW Country Press Association (NSWCPA) was formed by country press proprietors in reaction to the failure of politicians to amend the libel laws of NSW and Leslie became its first president. Leslie was also instrumental in the formation of the Australian Provincial Press Association.

After Leslie died, his wife Mary Isabella Leslie took over the reins with the couples' sons Arnot Crauford Leslie and Guy Crauford Leslie as editors. Guy Crauford Leslie died on 1 April 1926 and Arnot took on Guy's son Conrad Crauford Leslie. Arnot died in 1954 and Conrad continued until his death in 1962. The Crauford [Leslie?] dynasty continued when Conrad's wife of twenty-five years Annie Helen (Dixie) Crauford [Leslie?] became proprietor and editor. Annie eventually sold the paper to Noel and Pat Loughnan, owners of the Yarrawonga Chronicle, on 31 January 1980.

The Corowa Free Press absorbed The Corowa Chronicle on 1 February 1928. The paper continues both in hardcopy format and as an online resource.

== Digitisation ==
The Corowa Free Press has been digitised as part of the Australian Newspapers Digitisation Program of the National Library of Australia.

== See also ==
- List of newspapers in New South Wales
