= Guy Arkins =

Australian politician (1888–1980)

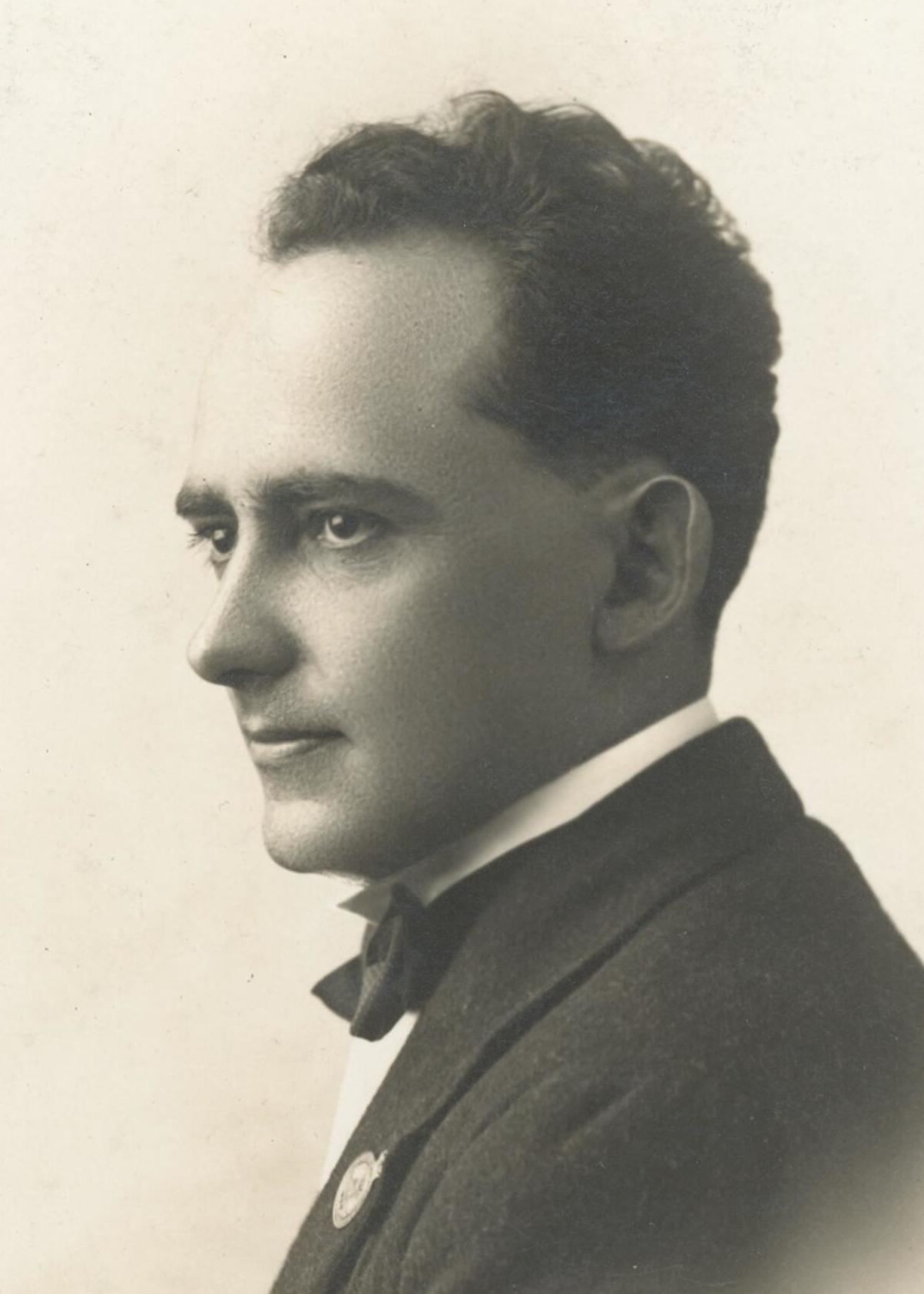

Senator for New South Wales
- In office 26 September 1935 – 22 October 1937
- Preceded by: Lionel Courtenay
- Succeeded by: Bill Ashley

Member of the New South Wales Legislative Assembly
- In office 20 February 1915 – 25 October 1930
- Preceded by: John Treflé (Castlereagh); William Bagnall (St George) district established (Rockdale)
- Succeeded by: district abolished (Castlereagh); Joseph Cahill (St George) district abolished (Rockdale)
- Constituency: Castlereagh (1915–1920); St George (1920–1927); Rockdale (1927–1930)
- In office 26 March 1938 – 10 May 1941
- Preceded by: John Ness
- Succeeded by: John Ness
- Constituency: Dulwich Hill

Personal details
- Born: 14 October 1888 Millthorpe, New South Wales
- Died: 2 August 1980 (aged 91) Port Hacking, New South Wales, Australia
- Party: Labor (to 1916); Nationalist (1916–31); UAP (from 1931)
- Spouse: Marguerite Edwards (m. 1921)
- Occupation: Clerk

James Guy Dalley Arkins (14 October 1888 – 2 August 1980) was an Australian politician. He was a Senator for New South Wales from 1935 to 1937, representing the United Australia Party (UAP). He began his career in the Australian Labor Party (ALP) and was elected to the New South Wales Legislative Assembly in 1915, but was expelled during the 1916 party split and joined the Nationalist Party. He lost his seat in 1930, but after his Senate tenure returned to state parliament from 1938 to 1941.

== Early life ==
Arkins was born on 14 October 1888 in Millthorpe, New South Wales. He was the son of Isabella (née Webb) and William James Arkin, his father being a storekeeper.

Arkins was educated at the local public school in Millthorpe. After leaving school he was employed as a flour miller for the Great Western Milling Company. He later worked as a journalist and building contractor.

== Early political career and military service ==
Arkins first stood for parliament at the 1913 New South Wales state election, running for the Labor Electoral League in the seat of Lyndhurst. He was elected to the New South Wales Legislative Assembly at the 1915 Castlereagh state by-election, following the death of the incumbent Labor MP John Treflé. He was 26 years old at the time of his election, becoming the youngest sitting member of parliament.

Due to his age, Arkins was accused by political opponents of disloyalty for his failure to immediately enlist in the Australian Imperial Force after the outbreak of World War I. He eventually enlisted in the AIF in March 1916. Later that year, Arkins sued The Castlereagh, a newspaper in his electorate, after it published an article alleging he had enlisted "from base and unworthy motives, and not from a wholehearted desire to serve his Majesty the King against his enemies". A jury found that the article had defamed him and awarded £50 in damages. He also issued legal threats against the Sydney Morning Herald and Daily Telegraph for articles in which they alleged he had made "unpatriotic" statements at political meetings, leading to public apologies from both newspapers.

Arkins supported the "Yes" vote during the 1916 conscription referendum. He was unsuccessfully opposed by an anti-conscription candidate, Joseph Clark, in a preselection ballot for Castlereagh in June 1916, despite an earlier agreement that serving AIF personnel would not be challenged. Following the ALP split over conscription, Arkins and 17 other state Labor MPs in New South Wales were expelled by the Political Labor League on 4 November 1916. They subsequently joined the new Nationalist Party under former ALP leader William Holman.

Arkins arrived in England in January 1917 and saw active service with the Australian Army Service Corps and the 1st Australian Mechanical Transport Company. During his military service he was re-elected against Clark at the 1917 state election. He returned to Australia in September 1919 and was formally discharged from the AIF the following month. At the 1920 state election, Arkins transferred to the newly created multi-member seat of St George. He transferred again to Rockdale at the 1927 election and was made Nationalist whip, but was defeated in 1930.

== Senator, 1935–1937 ==
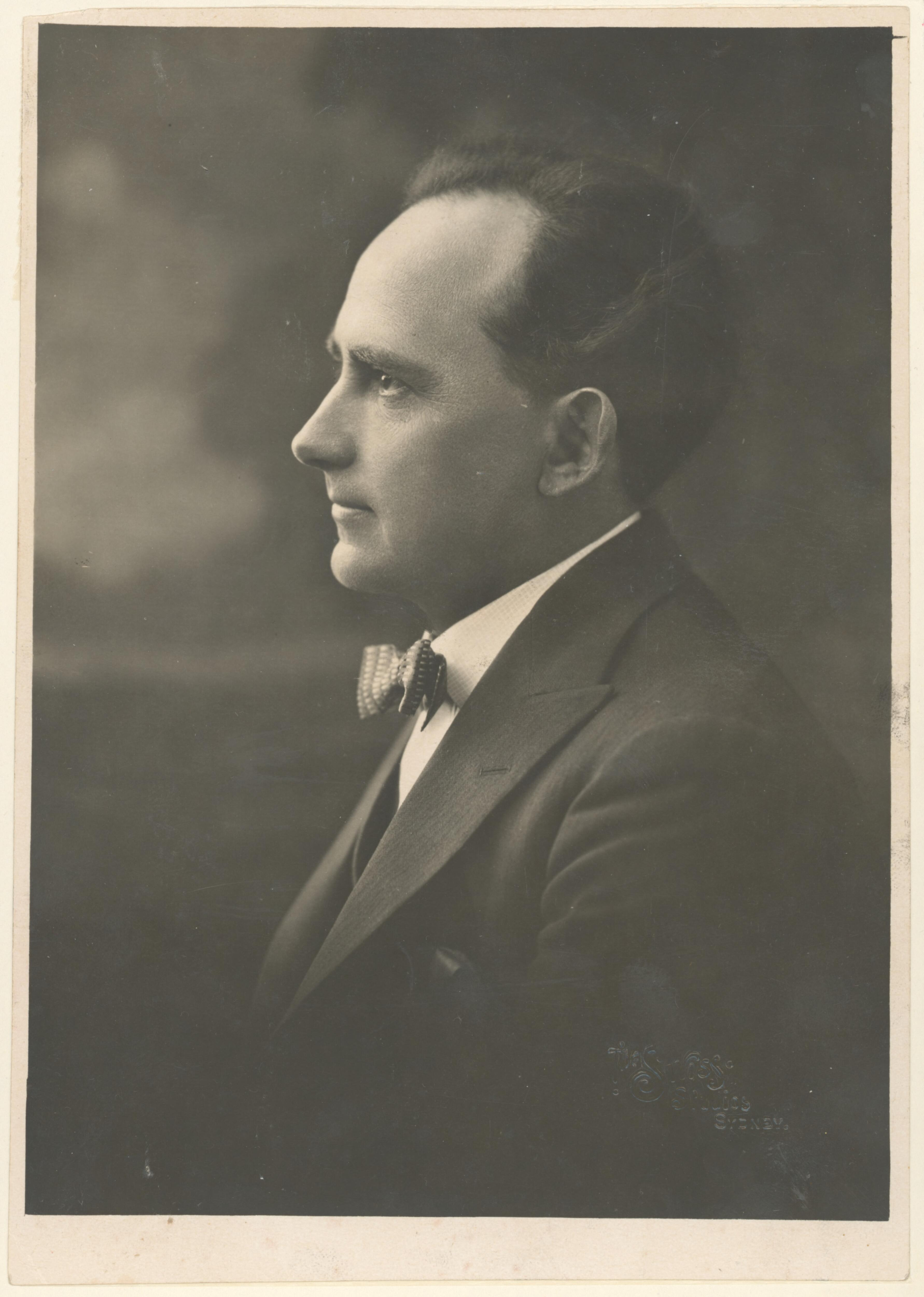
Arkins in 1931

Arkins was involved in the formation of the New South Wales branch of the United Australia Party (UAP) in 1931, serving on the joint committee of the Nationalist Party and the All for Australia League. He served on the party's state council from 1931 to 1940 and was a vice-president from 1940 to 1942.

At the 1934 federal election, Arkins was chosen in third position on the UAP's Senate ticket in New South Wales, behind Dick Dein and Lionel Courtenay. He ultimately withdrew from the ticket after the UAP reached an agreement to form a joint ticket with the Country Party, with Macartney Abbott taking his place.

On 29 September 1935, Arkins was elected by the parliament of New South Wales to fill the casual vacancy caused by the death of Courtenay, who had died several weeks after taking his seat. He faced five other candidates in the ballot, an unusually large number for a casual vacancy. Under the constitutional provisions at the time, Arkins' term expired at the 1937 federal election and an additional vacancy was contested to fill the remainder of Courtenay's original term. He stood for re-election but was defeated along with the other members of the UAP–Country joint ticket.

In the Senate, Arkins spoke on a range of topics including defence, immigration, primary industry and broadcasting. In 1936 he publicly criticised the management of the Australian Broadcasting Commission (ABC) and called for a royal commission into wireless broadcasting. He was also an early proponent of Australian television. Arkins favoured the expansion of the parliamentary committee system and called on the Lyons government to re-establish the joint committees on public accounts and public works, which had lapsed for cost reasons during the Great Depression.

== Final years in politics ==
Arkins was re-elected to the New South Wales Legislative Assembly at the 1938 state election, running for the UAP in the seat of Dulwich Hill. He was defeated at the 1941 state election after a single term. Arkins was subsequently a partner in several ventures with Sydney businessman Richard Thompson and was involved in the raising of war loans. His final candidacy for parliament came at the 1943 federal election, where he stood unsuccessfully on the UAP Senate ticket in New South Wales.

== Personal life ==
In 1921, Arkins married Marguerite Edwards, a concert pianist, with whom he had one son. He died on 2 August 1980 in Port Hacking, New South Wales, aged 91.

New South Wales Legislative Assembly
Preceded by John Treflé	Member for Castlereagh; 1915–1920	Succeeded by Abolished
Preceded by William Bagnall	Member for St George; 1920–1927; Served alongside: Bagnall/Cahill, Cann, Gosling, Ley/Bagnall	Succeeded by Joseph Cahill
New district	Member for Rockdale; 1927–1930	District abolished
Preceded by John Ness	Member for Dulwich Hill; 1938–1941	Succeeded by George Weir
Honorary titles
Preceded by Harry Foll	Earliest serving living Senator; 1977–1980	Succeeded by Philip McBride, Keith Wilson
