= The Corowa Chronicle =

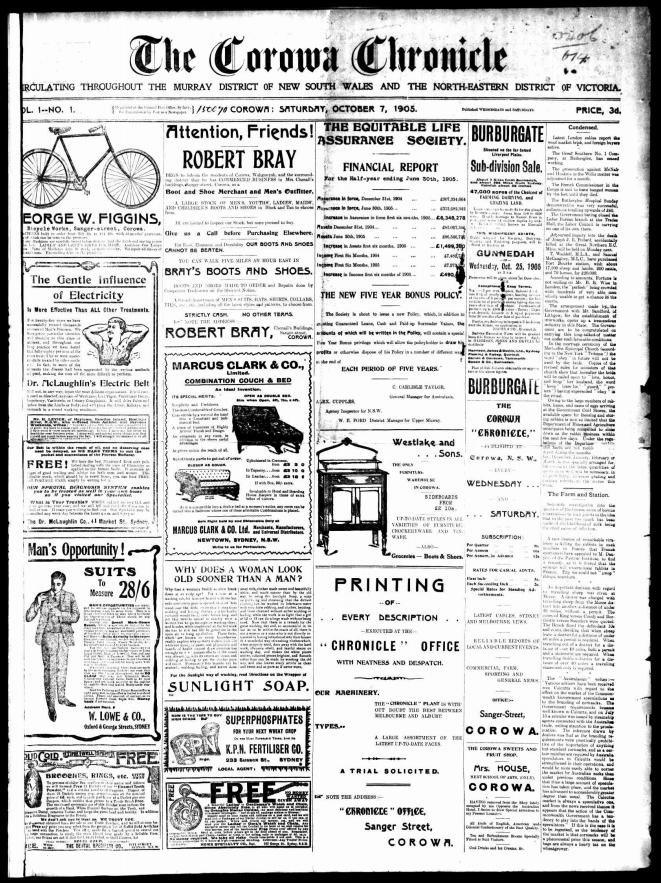
The front page of The Corowa Chronicle, 7 October 1905

The Corowa Chronicle was an English language newspaper published in Corowa, New South Wales, Australia from 1905 to 1928.

== History ==
The paper began on 7 October 1905 and was published by Albert John Esau until it ceased as a paper in its own right in 1928, when it was absorbed by The Corowa Free Press. The paper circulated throughout the Murray district of New South Wales and the north-eastern district of Victoria.

== Digitisation ==
The various versions of the paper have been digitised as part of the Australian Newspapers Digitisation Program project hosted by the National Library of Australia.

== See also ==
- List of newspapers in New South Wales
- List of newspapers in Australia

== Bibliography ==
- Country conscience : a history of the New South Wales provincial press, 1841-1995 / by Rod Kirkpatrick, Canberra City, A.C.T. : Infinite Harvest Publishing, 2000
- Looking good : the changing appearance of Australian newspapers / by Victor Isaacs, for the Australian Newspapers History Group, Middle Park, Qld. : Australian Newspaper History Group, 2007.
- Press timeline : Select chronology of significant Australian press events to 2011 / Compiled by Rod Kirkpatrick for the Australian Newspaper History Group
- Australian Newspaper History : A Bibliography / Compiled by Victor Isaacs, Rod Kirkpatrick and John Russell, Middle Park, Qld. : Australian Newspaper History Group, 2004.
- Newspapers in Australian libraries : a union list. 4th ed.
