= Electoral district of Burrendong =

Former state electoral district of New South Wales, Australia

Burrendong was an electoral district of Legislative Assembly of the Australian state of New South Wales, created in 1968, partly replacing Mudgee and named after the Burrendong Dam. It was abolished in 1981.

== Members for Burrendong ==
Member	Party	Period
Roger Wotton	Country	1968–1971
Leo Nott	Labor	1971–1973
Roger Wotton	Country	1973–1981

== Election results ==
1978 New South Wales state election: Burrendong
Party	Candidate	Votes	%	±%
National Country	Roger Wotton	13,614	58.3	+0.4
Labor	Reynold Toyer	9,746	41.7	−0.4
Total formal votes		23,360	98.6	−0.4
Informal votes		338	1.4	+0.4
Turnout		23,698	94.4	0.0
National Country hold		Swing	+0.4	
