= Thomas Temperley =

Thomas Temperley (c. 1845 – 5 June 1918) was a teacher and newspaperman in New South Wales.

== History ==
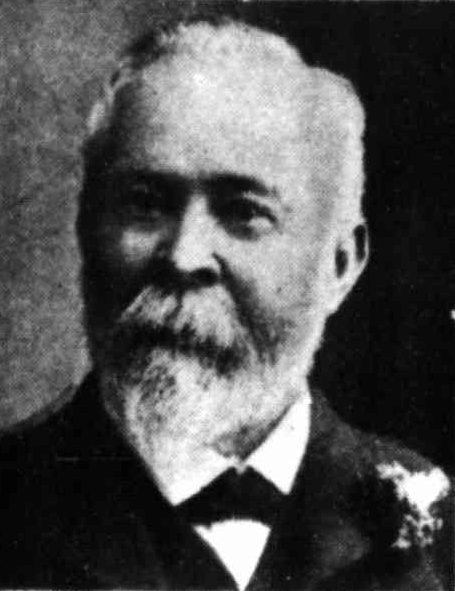
Thomas Temperley

Temperley was a son of Thomas Temperley, about whom nothing has been found, and Mary Temperley, who died in 1869.

Temperley was born in Parramatta and began his working life in Sydney as an apprentice engineer, but changed vocations. He was a teacher at Richmond in June 1867 when the Hawkesbury flooded, and was one of those who did valuable rescue work. He was teaching at the Church of England school, Richmond, in 1869, but three years later was in the public system at Picton and was one of those reprimanded for their association with the Journal of Primary Education. Others did not get off so lightly. At some stage he gained high professional credentials. His contributions to the Australian Journal of Education marked his introduction to journalism. He was the author of "Autobiography of Echidna" (apparently the marsupial anteater, not the goddess).

In 1875 he was proprietor of the Lansdowne Sawmill, and in 1879 contracted for a punt to carry timber across the river. In 1881 he was appointed Inspector of the northern fisheries.

He established the Ballina Pilot then became editor and proprietor of the weekly Richmond River Times (or R. R. Times) of Ballina, New South Wales. He was best remembered as a founding director of the NSW Country Newspaper Co-operative Company and served as president or chairman of that organisation on several occasions.

In the lead-up to the Federation referendum he was active in Queensland, arguing for the proposition, and in some quarters was given credit for its success. He argued for an excise on sugar harvested in Queensland by Kanaka labour, a benefit to NSW cane farmers, who relied on more expensive White labour. He promoted the formation of dairy co-ops, notably the North-Coast Co-operative Dairy Co-op at Byron Bay.

He was chosen by the Australasian Provincial Press Association to represent NSW country press at the 1909 Imperial Press Conference in London. Following this, he divested himself of the RR newspaper and founded the Independent Cable Association, which by 1910 had a reciprocal arrangement with the United Press Association of America.

For some years he conducted the cable news service of the Pacific Cable Association, owners of the Independent Cable Company of Australasia. They successfully tendered for the £6000 subsidy offered in 1910 by the Commonwealth government, of which the value to Australia was queried by Sir John Forrest. It was in the offices of this instrumentality, located within the Country Press Association chambers, that he died. His wife (Note: Martha Louisa Temperley, née Cross (died 13 June 1918), was a daughter of William Cross, pioneer of Manning River, and a grand-daughter of Rev. John Cross of Trial Bay. She has also been referred to as Margaret Louisa Temperley. She was a sister of George J. Cross, owner of the Lansdowne flour mill.) died a week later.

With Mr Temperley passes a man who, more than any other I have known in this vale of tears, gave the major portion of his time, talents and energy, without hope of fee or reward, for the benefit and betterment of the press as a whole. — T. M. Shakespeare

== Other interests ==
- Temperley was an active member of St Clement's (Anglican) Church, Marrickville.
- He contested the Legislative Assembly seat of Ballina on three occasions, unsuccessfully on each occasion.
- He was associated with the Ballina Hospital Committee and its president in 1901.
- He has written poetry. One piece, "Australbion", of the nature of a national anthem, has been published.

== Family ==
Thomas Temperley married Margaret (or Martha) Louisa Cross (1858–1918) on 18 January 1883. Six children survived childhood:

- William Cross Temperley (1884–1963) born at Palmer's Island, Clarence River; was resident in Vancouver

- Thomas Temperley (born 25 December 1916) married June Dorothee Leyland; was Flying Officer in WWII, presumed death July 1944

- John Erasmus Temperley (1886–1962) was resident in Sydney; in 1925 he was partner with C. J. Shakespeare in Federal Capital Press Ltd
- Mary Louisa "Madge" Temperley BSc (1887–1971), his eldest daughter, was a student at Sydney University. She married Stanley H. Knight in 1928
- Grace Sarah Temperley (1890–1982) was a nurse at Lismore. She married Joseph Olley in 1921
- Dora Isabella Temperley (1893–1985) was a teacher at the Public School at West Marrickville. She married Phillip Arundell Wright
- Thomas Edgar Nicholas Temperley (1896–1984) was with the First AIF on active service overseas.
