= John Treflé =

Farmer newspaper proprietor and politician in New South Wales, Australia

John Louis Treflé (4 December 1865 – 11 January 1915) was a farmer, newspaper proprietor and politician in New South Wales, Australia.

== Early life ==
He was born at Penshurst near Hamilton in Victoria to French Canadian farmer John Trefflée Hétu, known as John Treflé in Australia and Mary née McKenzie. He attended a convent school at Hamilton. The family moved to Temora, New South Wales around 1876, and Treflé was a boarder at St Patrick's College, Goulburn. On leaving school he worked on his father's farm at Temora, before branching out into newspapers, becoming owner and managing editor of the Temora Independent.

== Political career ==
Treflé was active in the Cootamundra land boards and the Farmers' and Settlers' Association of New South Wales, serving as secretary of the association from 1893 until 1898 and as vice-president from 1902 to 1940 and 1905 to 1906. He was a friend of Labour member William Holman whose seat of Grenfell included Temora and his mother and brother joined Labour in the 1890s. Treflé attempted unsuccessfully to forge links between the Farmers and Settlers Association and Labour, particularly in relation to agricultural policy and plans for a national bank. When the N.S.W. Country Press Association formed the N.S.W. Country Press Co-operative Company, Ltd, Treflé was elected a councillor. In 1904 he was a candidate at the election for The Upper Hunter, with the support of the Farmers' and Settlers' Association, but was unsuccessful with a margin of 955 votes (21.0%).

In 1906 he joined Labour and was their candidate for Castlereagh at the by-election for The Castlereagh in 1906, winning with a margin of 328 votes (1.1%) and holding the seat at the elections in 1907, 1910 and 1913. When Labour won the 1910 election, he was appointed an honorary minister without a portfolio in the McGowen ministry until 1911, when he was appointed Minister of Agriculture following the death of Donald Macdonell. George Beeby, the Secretary for Lands, resigned from the ministry, parliament and party in protest at the power of the extra-parliamentary Labor Party executive in December 1912 and Treflé took on the additional portfolio of Lands. He retained both portfolios in the first Holman ministry, before dropping the agriculture portfolio in 1914.

== Personal life ==
Treflé married Kathleen Shelly on 23 April 1902 in Manly. He died in Sydney on 11 January 1915 (aged 49), from complications of appendicitis. He was survived by his wife Kathleen, their daughter, also named Kathleen (aged 12) and son Liola (aged 9).

Parliament of New South Wales
Political offices
Preceded by Donald Macdonell	Minister of Agriculture; 1911–1914	Succeeded by William Ashford
Preceded by George Beeby	Secretary for Lands; 1912–1915	Succeeded by William Ashford
New South Wales Legislative Assembly
Preceded by Hugh Macdonald	Member for Castlereagh; 1906–1915	Succeeded by Guy Arkins
