= Electoral district of Coonamble =

State electoral district of New South Wales, Australia

Coonamble was an electoral district of the Legislative Assembly in the Australian state of New South Wales from 1894 to 1904, named after Coonamble. It was partly replaced by Castlereagh.

== Members for Coonamble ==
Member	Party	Term
Hugh Macdonald	Labor	1894–1904
