= Alfred Yeo (Australian politician) =

Australian politician (1890–1976)

Alfred William Yeo (17 August 1890 – 29 March 1976) was an Australian politician. He was a Country Party member of the New South Wales Legislative Assembly from 1932 to 1941, representing the electorate of Castlereagh.

Yeo was born at Cobboro, near Dunedoo, and was educated at the Tooraweenah and Dunedoo public schools. He became a farmer of sheep, wheat, and rice, and owned 'Wattle View', a property at Tooraweenah. He was the secretary of the Tooraweenah Agricultural Society, and was involved with the Railway League, Farmers and Settlers' Association and Grazier's Association. He was elected to the Gilgandra Shire council in 1928, serving until 1931; he was also elected to the state council of the Country Party in 1933.

Yeo entered state politics at the 1932 election, when he was preselected as the Country Party candidate for the Labor-held seat of Castlereagh, held by Joseph Clark. The 1932 election followed the Governor's dismissal of the Lang Labor government, and the conservative parties won in a landslide; Yeo easily won Castlereagh. He held the seat in 1932 and 1938, and became Country Party Whip before being appointed Secretary for Lands on 6 November 1940, only seven months before the 1941 state election.

The electoral redistribution before the 1941 election weakened Yeo's margin in Castlereagh, and he chose to contest the open seat of Liverpool Plains that year. However, the conservative government lost office, and he was defeated in the attempt to move seats; his party also lost Castlereagh. He contested a 1942 by-election for the seat of Dubbo, and his old seat of Castlereagh at the 1944 election, but was defeated both times. He subsequently retired from elective politics, but continued to serve on the state council of the Country Party until 1946.

Yeo subsequently moved to Leeton in the early 1950s, and died there in 1976.

New South Wales Legislative Assembly
Preceded by Joseph Clark	Member for Castlereagh; 1932 – 1941	Succeeded by Jack Renshaw
