= Jim Curran =

Australian politician

James Lawrence Curran (15 April 1927 – 18 May 2005) was a NSW politician (Australia) from Gilgandra, NSW. He was a Labor Party member of the New South Wales Legislative Assembly from 1980 to 1981, representing the electorate of Castlereagh.

== Early life ==
Curran was born in 1927 at Gilgandra where his father, Gilbert Curran, had arrived in 1908 as a young man from Horsham, Vic, with his own parents, brothers and sisters. Gilbert Curran's father, Con Curran snr, had purchased Gilgandra's Royal Hotel in May 1908, and in early 1909 Gilbert purchased a block of land of 3,650 acres adjacent to the Marthaguy Creek, which had been subdivided from "Berida" station. Jim Curran and his brothers were raised on this farming property, named "Bundah", located sixteen kilometres (ten miles) west from Gilgandra township. He later attended boarding school at St Stanislaus College in Bathurst, and won a scholarship to attend Armidale Teachers College.

He was appointed as a teacher in mid 1947. He taught variously in Moree, Bourke and Sydney. He met fellow teacher June Duffy and they were married in Sydney in 1949. They had no children. After his father's death in February 1957, Curran resigned from the Department of Education effective 9 Sept 1957 and moved to Malaya with his wife where they both took up school teaching posts at a company-owned tin-mining town on the east coast. They enjoyed a stimulating three-year period among the expatriate community engaged by the mine owners and made many lifelong international friends.

In 1960, after three years in Malaya, Mr and Mrs Curran returned to Australia. Curran gave up teaching to live at Gilgandra. He bought out his brothers' share in the family property "Bundah" and farmed there from 1960/61. He ran "Bundah" successfully as a mixed farm, growing wheat and raising sheep and beef cattle while his wife taught at Gilgandra primary school. He became heavily involved in the local farming community, serving as secretary and president of the United Farmers and Woolgrowers Association in Gilgandra, and being an active member of several farming and breeding groups. He was also a farming commentator for the local ABC station for a period. In 1971, he returned to teaching, running the library at Gilgandra High School and later taking up a position as library adviser to the Western Area for the Department of Education. In this role he had a stint in England on a library research grant. His wife June also taught in the library at Gilgandra High School.

== Political career ==
In 1977, Curran became the private secretary to the local MLA, Jack Renshaw, then the NSW Treasurer and who had formerly been the NSW Premier [April 1964 - May 1965). Curran and his wife were both involved in the Gilgandra branch of the NSW Labor Party during the 1960s and 70s, being its president and Secretary, respectively, for different periods. Curran's wider family had strong ties with the NSW ALP. His uncle, J.G. "Jack" Curran of the Royal Hotel Gilgandra, had been President of the Gilgandra branch of the ALP for several years in the 1940s and 50s, and members of the Curran family were strong supporters of Jack Renshaw, ALP member in the Castlereagh State electorate since 1941. Renshaw, with farming and agricultural origins, had a strong personal following in the nominally conservative-leaning country seat, appealing to a diverse range of voters from well-to-do graziers, to small farmers, to blue-collar workers, and he ultimately held the seat for Labor against Country Party opponents for four decades.

In January 1980, Renshaw resigned from the NSW Parliament and endorsed his private secretary, Curran, as ALP candidate at the resulting by-election to be held a few weeks later in February. Like Renshaw, Curran held the appeal of being from the land and understanding farming concerns while nevertheless standing for Labor values. Curran retained the seat for Labor after a fiercely contested campaign. However, following the by-election but before the next general 1981 state election a redistribution severely hampered his chances of winning the up-coming full-term general election. The redistribution changed the face of the Castlereagh electorate. Areas of more traditionally ALP-voting towns such as Nyngan had been moved out of the Castlereagh electorate and a large area of traditionally National Country Party-voting territory had been moved inside the electorate boundaries, including a large section of the adjacent seat of Burrendong which had been abolished. The boundary changes meant that Castlereagh notionally became a National Country seat. Burrendong had been held for some years by National Country MLA Roger Wotton. With the benefit of both his own strong personal following and large areas of his former Burrendong electorate now within Castlereagh, Wotton contested Castlereagh against Curran. As predicted on the basis of the new boundaries, Wotton succeeded in winning the seat from Curran.

== Life after politics ==
Curran remained involved in public life after his parliamentary defeat, while still living on and working his farm. In the 1980s he worked with NSW Trade in New York for two years as Manager of Industrial Promotion for New South Wales, and after his return to Australia he was later appointed as an Assistant Commissioner for Western Lands. Retired from full-time work for some years, and from his farming property, he died at Gilgandra in May 2005, survived by his wife, June.

New South Wales Legislative Assembly
Preceded by Jack Renshaw	Member for Castlereagh; 1980–1981	Succeeded by Roger Wotton
