= Roger Wotton =

Australian politician (1919–2012)

Roger Corfield Anson Wotton AM (14 June 1919 – 6 September 2012) was an Australian politician. He was the Country Party (later National Party) member for Burrendong from 1968 to 1971 and from 1973 to 1981, and then for Castlereagh from 1981 to 1991 in the New South Wales Legislative Assembly.

Wotton was born in Ardlethan, New South Wales, and attended the local public school and then Yanco Agricultural High School. He served in the 2nd Australian Imperial Force 1940–45, rising to the rank of lieutenant and serving in Darwin, Morotai and Borneo. He married Shirley Crick on 3 February 1945, with whom he had five children. He became a farmer and grazier after the war, and joined the Country Party in 1950. He served on Coonabarabran Shire Council from 1963 to 1968, and as Deputy Shire President from 1965.

== Political career ==
In 1968, Wotton was selected as the Country Party's candidate for the new state seat of Burrendong, which largely replaced the old seat of Mudgee. He was elected without difficulty on Liberal preferences. In 1971, however, he was challenged by Leo Nott, the former Labor member for Mudgee who had retired at the previous election. Nott was narrowly successful, but Wotton defeated him in 1973. In 1981, Burrendong was abolished, and Wotton contested the seat of Castlereagh, which, despite being held by Labor MP Jim Curran, now had a notional NCP majority. Wotton was successful, and held the seat until its abolition in 1991, when he retired.

== Cricket career ==
Wotton was a talented cricketer who represented the New South Wales Country side and played Sydney grade cricket. Later, he managed the Australian cricket team's 1977 tour of New Zealand.

== Honours and recognition ==
In the 1994 Queen's Birthday Honours Wotton was made a Member of the Order of Australia for "service to the community and to the New South Wales Parliament" and was awarded the Australian Sports Medal in 2000 in recognition of "27 years voluntary service to cricket administration at state level".

== Death ==
Wotton died in September 2012, shortly before his 93rd birthday.

== Sources ==
Baddeley, Q, ed. (1977). Rothman's Tour: Australia v New Zealand, Second Test. Auckland: Auckland Cricket Association.

New South Wales Legislative Assembly
Preceded by New seat	Member for Burrendong; 1968–1971	Succeeded by Leo Nott
Preceded by Leo Nott	Member for Burrendong; 1973–1981	Succeeded by Abolished
Preceded by Jim Curran	Member for Castlereagh; 1981–1991	Succeeded by Abolished
