= Hugh Macdonald (Australian politician) =

Scottish-born Australian politician

Hugh Macdonald (c. 1850 – 18 October 1906) was a Scottish-born Australian politician.

He was born at Duntulm in Scotland to Alexander Macdonald and Eliza Cartwright. He arrived in Australia in 1876 and worked on his uncle's station at Myall Creek. An early organiser of the Shearers Union, he was also elected an alderman at Coonamble several times. On 19 December 1898 he married Mary Davidson Hewitt, with whom he had a son. He was elected to the New South Wales Legislative Assembly in 1894 as the Labour member for Coonamble. He transferred to Castlereagh in 1904, but died in Sydney in 1906.

New South Wales Legislative Assembly
New seat	Member for Coonamble; 1894–1904	Abolished
New seat	Member for Castlereagh; 1904–1906	Succeeded by John Treflé
