= Joseph Alfred Clark =

Australian politician

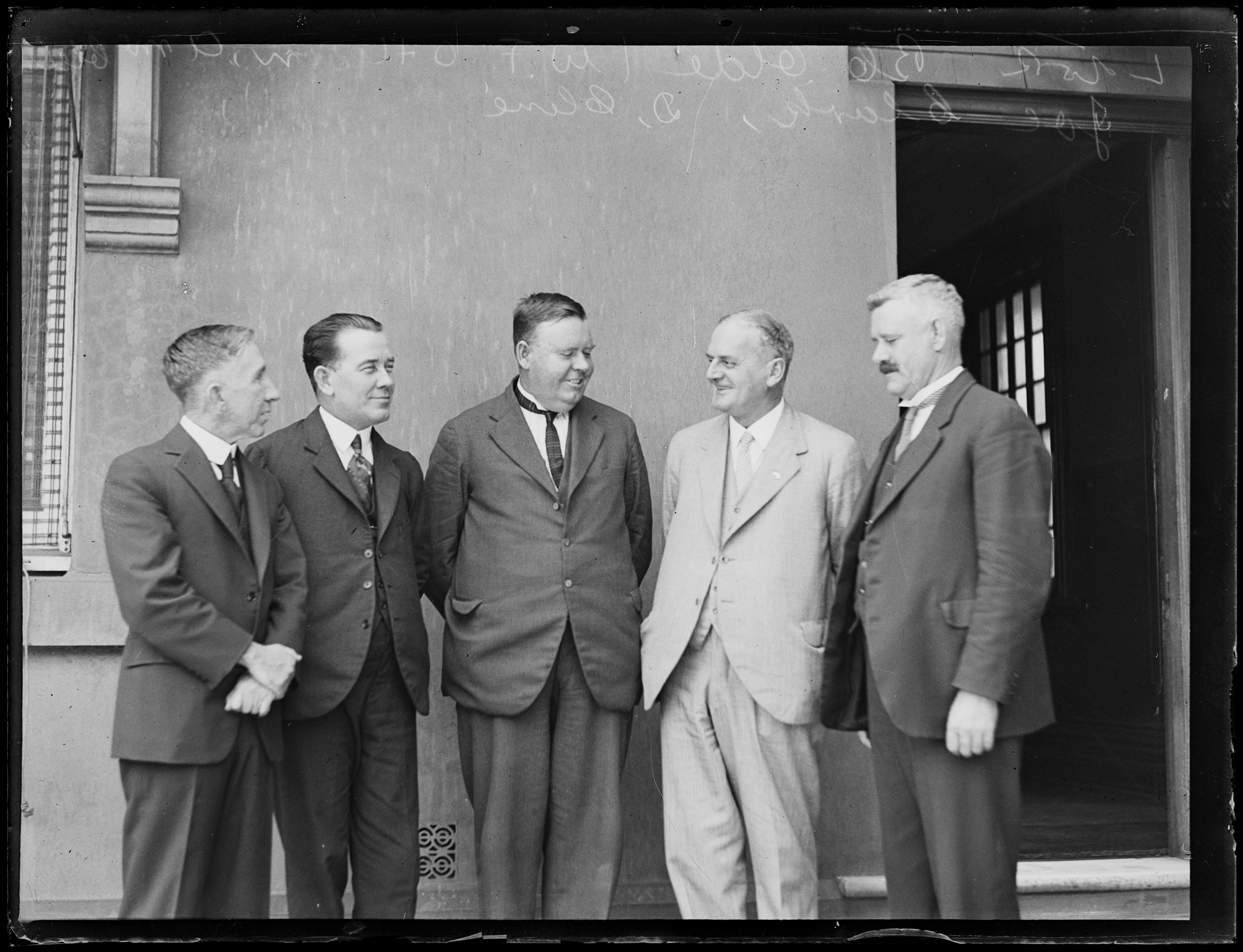
Clark (second from right) with fellow Labor MPs Barney Olde, Walter O'Hearn, Alf McClelland and Daniel Clyne

Joseph Alfred Clark (21 November 1872 – 25 April 1951) was an Australian politician.

He was born at Marrickville to master mariner James Clark and Mary, née Evans. He attended Marrickville Superior Public School before becoming a bushworker in the central west of New South Wales, living for periods in Dubbo and Coonamble. Around 1896 he married Elizabeth Ellen Finlay, with whom he had six children. He was an alderman at Coonamble from 1902 to 1920, serving as mayor from 1907 to 1908 and from 1911 to 1913. A member of the Labor Party, he served in the New South Wales Legislative Assembly as one of the members for Wammerawa from 1920 to 1922 and from 1922 to 1927, and as the member for Castlereagh from 1930 to 1932. Clark died at Darlinghurst in 1951. His son Joe would serve in the Australian House of Representatives from 1934 to 1969.

New South Wales Legislative Assembly
Preceded by New district	Member for Wammerawa; 1920–1922; With: Bill Dunn; William Ashford	Succeeded by Harold Thorby; Bill Dunn; William Ashford
Preceded by William Ashford	Member for Wammerawa; 1922–1927; With: Bill Dunn; Harold Thorby	Succeeded by District abolished
Preceded by Harold Thorby	Member for Castlereagh; 1930–1932	Succeeded by Alfred Yeo
