= Electoral district of Castlereagh =

Former state electoral district of New South Wales, Australia

Castlereagh, or The Castlereagh until 1910, was an electoral district of the Legislative Assembly in the Australian state of New South Wales originally created in the 1904 re-distribution of electorates following the 1903 New South Wales referendum, which required the number of members of the Legislative Assembly to be reduced from 125 to 90. It consisted of the abolished seat of Coonamble and part of the abolished seat of Dubbo and was named after the Castlereagh River. In 1920, with the introduction of proportional representation, it was absorbed into Wammerawa, along with Mudgee and Liverpool Plains. It was recreated in 1927 and abolished in 1991, replaced by Barwon in the north-west, including the towns of Narrabri and Gilgandra, and by Upper Hunter in the south-east, including the town of Mudgee.

== Members for Castlereagh ==
First incarnation (1904–1920)
Member	Party	Term
Hugh Macdonald	Labour	1904–1906
John Treflé	Labour	1906–1915
Guy Arkins	Labor	1915–1917
Guy Arkins	Nationalist	1917–1920
Second incarnation (1927–1991)
Member	Party	Term
Harold Thorby	Country	1927–1930
Joseph Clark	Labor	1930–1932
Alfred Yeo	Country	1932–1941
Jack Renshaw	Labor	1941–1980
Jim Curran	Labor	1980–1981
Roger Wotton	National	1981–1991

== Election results ==
1988 New South Wales state election: Castlereagh
Party	Candidate	Votes	%	±%
National	Roger Wotton	19,482	67.0	+11.1
Labor	Michael Williams	7,425	25.6	−13.1
Democrats	Peter Lyons	2,151	7.4	+5.7
Total formal votes		29,058	97.8	−1.1
Informal votes		662	2.2	+1.1
Turnout		29,720	93.1	
Two-party-preferred result
National	Roger Wotton	20,515	71.9	+13.3
Labor	Michael Williams	8,008	28.1	−13.3
National hold		Swing	+13.3	
