= Electoral results for the district of Redfern =

Election results for Redfern, New South Wales, Australia

Redfern, an electoral district of the Legislative Assembly in the Australian state of New South Wales, has had two incarnations, the first from 1880 to 1920, the second from 1927 to 1968.

Election	Member	Party	Member	Party				
1880	Alfred Fremlin	None	John Sutherland	None				
1882 by	Alfred Fremlin	None	Francis Wright	None	Member	Party		
1882	Alfred Fremlin	None	Francis Wright	None	John Sutherland	None		
1885	Arthur Renwick	None	Thomas Williamson	None	John Sutherland	None		
1886 by	Arthur Renwick	None	Thomas Williamson	None	John Sutherland	None	Member	Party
1887	William Stephen	Free Trade	William Schey	Free Trade	John Sutherland	Free Trade	James Farnell	Free Trade
1888 by	William Stephen	Free Trade	William Schey	Free Trade	John Sutherland	Free Trade	Peter Howe	Protectionist
1889	William Stephen	Free Trade	Charles Goodchap	Protectionist	John Sutherland	Free Trade	Peter Howe	Protectionist
1889 by	William Stephen	Free Trade	Charles Goodchap	Protectionist	William Schey	Protectionist	Peter Howe	Protectionist
1891	James McGowen	Labour	Henry Hoyle	Protectionist	William Schey	Protectionist	William Sharp	Labour
1894	James McGowen	Labour						
1895	James McGowen	Labour						
1898	James McGowen	Labour						
1901	James McGowen	Labour						
1904	James McGowen	Labour						
1907	James McGowen	Labour						
1910	James McGowen	Labour						
1913	James McGowen	Labour						
1917	William McKell	Labor						
Election	Member	Party						
1927	William McKell	Labor						
1930	William McKell	Labor						
1932	William McKell	Labor (NSW)						
1935	William McKell	Labor (NSW)						
1938	William McKell	Labor						
1941	William McKell	Labor						
1944	William McKell	Labor						
1947	George Noble	Labor						
1949 by	Kevin Dwyer	Labor						
1950	Fred Green	Labor						
1953	Fred Green	Labor						
1956	Fred Green	Labor						
1959	Fred Green	Labor						
1962	Fred Green	Labor						
1965	Fred Green	Labor						

== Election results ==
=== Elections in the 1960s ===
==== 1965 ====
1965 New South Wales state election: Redfern
Party	Candidate	Votes	%	±%
Labor	Fred Green	14,453	72.4	−9.4
Liberal	Gerald Bayliss	4,811	24.1	+10.7
Communist	Cecil Sharrock	703	3.5	−1.4
Total formal votes		19,967	96.6	−1.2
Informal votes		692	3.4	+1.2
Turnout		20,659	91.1	+0.1
Two-party-preferred result
Labor	Fred Green	15,015	75.2	−10.5
Liberal	Gerald Bayliss	4,952	24.8	+10.5
Labor hold		Swing	−10.5	

==== 1962 ====
1962 New South Wales state election: Redfern
Party	Candidate	Votes	%	±%
Labor	Fred Green	18,284	81.8	+2.3
Liberal	Peter Kamperogianis	2,987	13.4	−3.5
Communist	Henry Hatfield	1,090	4.9	+1.2
Total formal votes		22,361	97.8	
Informal votes		503	2.2	
Turnout		22,864	91.0	
Two-party-preferred result
Labor	Fred Green	19,156	85.7	+3.5
Liberal	Peter Kamperogianis	3,205	14.3	−3.5
Labor hold		Swing	+3.5	

=== Elections in the 1950s ===
==== 1959 ====
1959 New South Wales state election: Redfern
Party	Candidate	Votes	%	±%
Labor	Fred Green	15,520	76.5	
Liberal	Mary Beckett	4,032	19.9	
Communist	Arthur Shipton	744	3.7	
Total formal votes		20,296	97.4	
Informal votes		540	2.6	
Turnout		20,836	92.6	
Two-party-preferred result
Labor	Fred Green	16,115	79.4	
Liberal	Mary Beckett	4,181	20.6	
Labor hold		Swing		

==== 1956 ====
1956 New South Wales state election: Redfern
Party	Candidate	Votes	%	±%
Labor	Fred Green	16,584	90.4	−2.3
Communist	Arthur Shipton	1,754	9.6	+2.3
Total formal votes		18,338	93.5	−0.4
Informal votes		1,265	6.5	+0.4
Turnout		19,603	93.6	+1.4
Labor hold		Swing	−2.3	

==== 1953 ====
1953 New South Wales state election: Redfern
Party	Candidate	Votes	%	±%
Labor	Fred Green	18,484	92.7	
Communist	Henry Hatfield	1,464	7.3	
Total formal votes		19,948	93.9	
Informal votes		1,295	6.1	
Turnout		21,243	92.2	
Labor hold		Swing		

==== 1950 ====
1950 New South Wales state election: Redfern
Party	Candidate	Votes	%	±%
Labor	Fred Green	14,981	74.0	
Liberal	Phillip Pethers	3,401	16.8	
Independent Labor	Frederick Fairbrother	1,129	5.6	
Communist	Mervyn Pidcock	738	3.6	
Total formal votes		20,249	96.7	
Informal votes		684	3.3	
Turnout		20,933	92.7	
Two-party-preferred result
Labor	Fred Green		81.0 (Note: Two party preferred vote was estimated.)	
Liberal	Phillip Pethers		19.0	
Labor hold		Swing		

=== Elections in the 1940s ===
==== 1949 by-election ====
1949 Redfern by-election Saturday 12 March
Party	Candidate	Votes	%	±%
Labor	Kevin Dwyer	10,495	91.2	
Communist	Mervyn Pidcock	1,366	8.8	
Total formal votes		15,440	94.8	
Informal votes		854	5.2	
Turnout		16,294	77.9	
Labor hold		Swing		

The by-election was caused by the death of George Noble (Labor).

==== 1947 ====
1947 New South Wales state election: Redfern
Party	Candidate	Votes	%	±%
Labor	George Noble	13,015	65.7	+4.8
Lang Labor	Edward Waters	3,785	19.1	−20.0
Protestant Labour	Frederick Fairbrother	1,727	8.7	+8.7
Communist	Jack Miles	1,281	6.5	+6.5
Total formal votes		19,808	95.9	−0.5
Informal votes		856	4.1	+0.5
Turnout		20,664	94.2	+2.3
Labor hold		Swing	N/A	

- Preferences were not distributed.

==== 1944 ====
1944 New South Wales state election: Redfern
Party	Candidate	Votes	%	±%
Labor	William McKell	11,299	60.9	−16.4
Lang Labor	Patrick Tyrrell	7,246	39.1	+39.1
Total formal votes		18,545	96.4	+0.3
Informal votes		688	3.6	−0.3
Turnout		19,233	91.9	−0.8
Labor hold		Swing	N/A	

==== 1941 ====
1941 New South Wales state election: Redfern
Party	Candidate	Votes	%	±%
Labor	William McKell	14,299	77.3	
State Labor	Sid Conway	4,201	22.7	
Total formal votes		18,500	96.1	
Informal votes		747	3.9	
Turnout		19,247	92.7	
Labor hold		Swing		

=== Elections in the 1930s ===
==== 1938 ====
1938 New South Wales state election: Redfern
Party	Candidate	Votes	%	±%
Labor	William McKell	unopposed		
Labor hold				

==== 1935 ====
1935 New South Wales state election: Redfern
Party	Candidate	Votes	%	±%
Labor (NSW)	William McKell	13,981	91.1	+17.7
Communist	Robert McWilliams	1,373	8.9	+7.9
Total formal votes		15,354	92.2	−5.9
Informal votes		1,295	7.8	+5.9
Turnout		16,649	96.0	−0.2
Labor (NSW) hold		Swing	N/A	

==== 1932 ====
1932 New South Wales state election: Redfern
Party	Candidate	Votes	%	±%
Labor (NSW)	William McKell	12,190	73.4	−13.7
United Australia	John Wright	3,557	21.4	+9.8
Federal Labor	Harold Sutton	696	4.2	+4.2
Communist	Jean Thomson-Marsh	170	1.0	−0.3
Total formal votes		16,613	98.1	+0.2
Informal votes		326	1.9	−0.2
Turnout		16,939	96.2	+1.7
Labor (NSW) hold		Swing	N/A	

- Preferences were not distributed.

==== 1930 ====
1930 New South Wales state election: Redfern
Party	Candidate	Votes	%	±%
Labor	William McKell	14,676	87.1	
Nationalist	James Correy	1,953	11.6	
Communist	Jean Thomson-Marsh	224	1.3	
Total formal votes		16,853	97.9	
Informal votes		353	2.1	
Turnout		17,206	94.5	
Labor hold		Swing		

=== Elections in the 1920s ===
==== 1927 ====
1927 New South Wales state election: Redfern
Party	Candidate	Votes	%	±%
Labor	William McKell	9,871	75.5	
Nationalist	Frederick Meiklejohn	3,197	24.5	
Total formal votes		13,068	97.8	
Informal votes		294	2.2	
Turnout		13,362	81.2	
Labor win		(new seat)		

District re-created

==== 1920 - 1927 ====
District abolished District abolished

=== Elections in the 1910s ===
==== 1917 ====
1917 New South Wales state election: Redfern
Party	Candidate	Votes	%	±%
Labor	William McKell	4,757	66.2	−2.2
Nationalist	James McGowen	2,388	33.2	+3.5
Ind. Socialist Labor	Henry Ostler	42	0.6	−1.4
Total formal votes		7,187	99.1	+1.5
Informal votes		64	0.9	−1.5
Turnout		7,251	60.6	−1.4
Labor hold		Swing	−2.2	

The sitting member James McGowen was expelled from Labor in the November 1916 Labor split over conscription.

==== 1913 ====
1913 New South Wales state election: Redfern
Party	Candidate	Votes	%	±%
Labor	James McGowen	4,840	68.4	
Liberal Reform	George Howe	2,100	29.7	
Socialist Labor	Henry Ostler	140	2.0	
Total formal votes		7,080	97.6	
Informal votes		177	2.4	
Turnout		7,257	62.0	
Labor hold				

==== 1910 ====
1910 New South Wales state election: Redfern
Party	Candidate	Votes	%	±%
Labour	James McGowen	4,411	70.3	
Liberal Reform	John Fegan	1,866	29.7	
Total formal votes		6,277	97.3	
Informal votes		175	2.7	
Turnout		6,452	68.3	
Labour hold				

=== Elections in the 1900s ===
==== 1907 ====
1907 New South Wales state election: Redfern
Party	Candidate	Votes	%	±%
Labour	James McGowen	3,222	53.4	
Liberal Reform	George Howe	2,811	46.6	
Total formal votes		6,033	97.6	
Informal votes		149	2.4	
Turnout		6,182	71.5	
Labour hold				

==== 1904 ====
1904 New South Wales state election: Redfern
Party	Candidate	Votes	%	±%
Labour	James McGowen	2,984	55.0	
Liberal Reform	George Howe	2,401	44.3	
Socialist Labor	Henry Ostler	40	0.7	
Total formal votes		5,425	98.7	
Informal votes		72	1.3	
Turnout		5,497	60.7	
Labour hold				

Redfern was expanded to include part of the abolished seat of Darlington. The member for Redfern was James McGowen (Labour). The member for Darlington was Phillip Sullivan (Labour) who successfully contested Phillip.

==== 1901 ====
1901 New South Wales state election: Redfern
Party	Candidate	Votes	%	±%
Labour	James McGowen	1,560	68.9	+13.8
Liberal Reform	Peter McNaught	608	26.9	+26.9
Independent	Joseph Butterfield	96	4.2	+3.5
Total formal votes		2,264	99.5	+0.3
Informal votes		11	0.5	−0.3
Turnout		2,275	61.1	+4.4
Labour hold				

=== Elections in the 1890s ===
==== 1898 ====
1898 New South Wales colonial election: Redfern
Party	Candidate	Votes	%	±%
Labour	James McGowen	916	55.2	
National Federal	William Cameron	726	43.7	
Independent Federalist	Joseph Butterfield	13	0.8	
Independent	William Hunter	6	0.4	
Total formal votes		1,661	99.2	
Informal votes		13	0.8	
Turnout		1,674	56.7	
Labour hold				

==== 1895 ====
1895 New South Wales colonial election: Redfern
Party	Candidate	Votes	%	±%
Labour	James McGowen	948	59.1	
Protectionist	Henry Hoyle	614	38.3	
Ind. Free Trade	Samuel Bradley	43	2.7	
Total formal votes		1,605	99.6	
Informal votes		6	0.4	
Turnout		1,611	62.8	
Labour hold				

==== 1894 ====
1894 New South Wales colonial election: Redfern
Party	Candidate	Votes	%	±%
Labour	James McGowen	800	37.1	
Protectionist	Henry Hoyle	590	27.4	
Free Trade	Samuel Bradley	497	23.1	
Ind. Free Trade	William Coombes	144	6.7	
Ind. Free Trade	William Poole	124	5.8	
Total formal votes		2,155	99.0	
Informal votes		22	1.0	
Turnout		2,177	84.6	
Labour win		(previously 4 members)		

==== 1891 ====
1891 New South Wales colonial election: Redfern Wednesday 17 June
Party	Candidate	Votes	%	±%
Protectionist	Henry Hoyle (elected 1)	2,982	11.8	
Protectionist	William Schey (re-elected 2)	2,768	10.9	
Labour	James McGowen (elected 3)	2,712	10.7	
Labour	William Sharp (elected 4)	2,686	10.6	
Protectionist	Peter Howe (defeated)	2,632	10.4	
Free Trade	George Anderson	2,629	10.4	
Free Trade	William Stephen (defeated)	2,535	10.0	
Free Trade	William Manuell	2,279	9.0	
Free Trade	John Beveridge	2,184	8.6	
Protectionist	George Garton	1,240	4.9	
Ind. Free Trade	William Coombes	724	2.9	
Total formal votes		25,371	99.1	
Informal votes		219	0.9	
Turnout		7,479	75.1	
Protectionist hold 2				
Labour gain 2 from Free Trade				

William Schey (Protectionist) won a seat at a by-election in 1889 and retained it at this election.

=== Elections in the 1880s ===
==== 1889 by-election ====
1889 Redfern by-election Monday 8 July
Party	Candidate	Votes	%	±%
Protectionist	William Schey (elected)	2,915	50.2	
Free Trade	George Anderson	2,890	49.8	
Total formal votes		5,805	98.8	
Informal votes		69	1.2	
Turnout		5,874	61.2	
Protectionist hold				

John Sutherland (Protectionist) died.

==== 1889 ====
1889 New South Wales colonial election: Redfern Saturday 2 February
Party	Candidate	Votes	%	±%
Free Trade	John Sutherland (elected 1)	2,988	13.8	
Protectionist	Peter Howe (elected 2)	2,896	13.3	
Free Trade	William Stephen (elected 3)	2,574	11.9	
Protectionist	Charles Goodchap (elected 4)	2,528	11.6	
Protectionist	David Davis	2,480	11.4	
Protectionist	Thomas Williamson	2,429	11.2	
Free Trade	George Anderson	2,414	11.1	
Free Trade	John Beveridge	2,397	11.0	
Protectionist	William Schey	1,023	4.7	
Total formal votes		21,729	98.5	
Informal votes		323	1.5	
Turnout		6,035	64.7	
Protectionist gain 2 from Free Trade				
Free Trade hold 2				

Peter Howe (Protectionist) won a seat at a by-election in 1888 and retained it at this election. William Schey had been elected as a Free Trade member in Redfern however changed to the Protectionist party for this election.

==== 1888 by-election ====
1888 Redfern by-election Saturday 8 September
Party	Candidate	Votes	%	±%
Protectionist	Peter Howe (elected)	2,957	58.4	
Free Trade	John Martin	2,105	41.6	
Total formal votes		5,062	98.5	
Informal votes		77	1.5	
Turnout		5,139	56.1	
Protectionist gain from Free Trade				

James Farnell (Free Trade) died.

==== 1887 ====
1887 New South Wales colonial election: Redfern Saturday 5 February
Party	Candidate	Votes	%	±%
Free Trade	John Sutherland (re-elected 1)	3,582	23.2	
Free Trade	James Farnell (elected 2)	2,644	17.1	
Free Trade	William Stephen (elected 3)	2,599	16.8	
Free Trade	William Schey (elected 4)	2,407	15.6	
Protectionist	Arthur Renwick (defeated)	1,938	12.6	
Protectionist	Peter Howe	1,803	11.7	
Protectionist	Alfred Fremlin	467	3.0	
Total formal votes		15,440	99.3	
Informal votes		103	0.7	
Turnout		5,053	58.8	
		(1 new seat)		

==== 1886 by-election ====
1886 Redfern by-election Tuesday, 9 March
Candidate	Votes	%
Arthur Renwick (re-elected)	1,769	53.8
William Stephen	1,522	46.2
Total formal votes	3,291	98.7
Informal votes	42	1.3
Turnout	3,333	43.4

Arthur Renwick was appointed Minister of Public Instruction in the Jennings ministry.

==== 1885 ====
1885 New South Wales colonial election: Redfern Friday 16 October
Candidate	Votes	%
John Sutherland (re-elected 1)	2,806	25.3
Arthur Renwick (elected 2)	2,137	19.3
Thomas Williamson (elected 3)	2,009	18.1
William Stephens	1,861	16.8
Francis Wright (defeated)	1,232	11.1
John Martin	1,042	9.4
Total formal votes	11,087	98.9
Informal votes	125	1.1
Turnout	5,325	69.4

==== 1882 ====
1882 New South Wales colonial election: Redfern Monday 4 December
Candidate	Votes	%
Francis Wright (re-elected 1)	2,209	28.2
Alfred Fremlin (re-elected 2)	2,075	26.5
John Sutherland (elected 3)	1,992	25.4
Thomas Williamson	1,555	19.9
Total formal votes	7,831	99.6
Informal votes	34	0.4
Turnout	3,533	59.4
	(1 new seat)	

==== 1882 by-election ====
1882 Redfern by-election Monday 23 January
Candidate	Votes	%
Francis Wright (elected)	1,704	67.5
John Williamson	819	32.5
Total formal votes	2,523	98.5
Informal votes	37	1.5
Turnout	2,560	47.8

John Sutherland resigned.

==== 1880 ====
1880 New South Wales colonial election: Redfern Friday 19 November
Candidate	Votes	%
John Sutherland (elected 1)	2,386	40.3
Alfred Fremlin (elected 2)	2,209	37.3
Patrick Stanley	757	12.8
Patrick Hogan	567	9.6
Total formal votes	5,919	99.1
Informal votes	55	0.9
Turnout	3,567	66.0
	(new seat)	
