= 1889 Redfern colonial by-election =

By-election in New South Wales, Australia

A by-election was held for the New South Wales Legislative Assembly electorate of Redfern on 8 July 1889 because of the death of John Sutherland (Protectionist).

== Dates ==
Date	Event
23 June 1889	John Sutherland died.
28 June 1889	Writ of election issued by the Speaker of the Legislative Assembly.
4 July 1889	Day of nomination
8 July 1889	Polling day
16 July 1889	Return of writ

== Candidates ==
- George Anderson (Free Trade) was a wool merchant and a past Mayor of Waterloo who had been unsuccessful at the election in January 1889 by a margin of 114 votes (0.5%).
- William Schey (Protectionist) was the secretary of the Railways and Tramways Association and the district included the Eveleigh Railway Yards. He had been elected as a Free Trade member for Redfern in 1887, however he switched to the Protectionist party for the 1889 election where he finished last with a margin of 1,505 votes (6.9%).

== Result ==
1889 Redfern by-election Monday 8 July
Party	Candidate	Votes	%	±%
Protectionist	William Schey (elected)	2,915	50.2	
Free Trade	George Anderson	2,890	49.8	
Total formal votes		5,805	98.8	
Informal votes		69	1.2	
Turnout		5,874	61.2	
Protectionist hold				

== See also ==
- Electoral results for the district of Redfern
- List of New South Wales state by-elections
