= Electoral results for the district of Waterloo =

Election results for Waterloo, New South Wales, Australia

Waterloo, an electoral district of the Legislative Assembly in the Australian state of New South Wales was created in 1894 and abolished in 1904.

Election	Member	Party
1894	George Anderson	Ind. Free Trade
1895	George Anderson	Free Trade
1898	George Anderson	Free Trade
1901	George Anderson	Liberal Reform

== Election results ==
=== Elections in the 1900s ===
==== 1901 ====
1901 New South Wales state election: Waterloo
Party	Candidate	Votes	%	±%
Liberal Reform	George Anderson	1,125	50.9	+0.8
Labour	Ernest Banner	1,026	46.5	+25.9
Socialist Labor	James Morrish	52	2.4	
Independent	Henry Maynard	6	0.3	−0.3
Total formal votes		2,209	99.5	+0.3
Informal votes		11	0.5	−0.3
Turnout		2,220	65.2	+2.4
Liberal Reform hold				

=== Elections in the 1890s ===
==== 1898 ====
1898 New South Wales colonial election: Waterloo
Party	Candidate	Votes	%	±%
Free Trade	George Anderson	872	50.2	
National Federal	William Martin	499	28.7	
Labour	Frederick Flowers	357	20.5	
Independent	Henry Maynard	9	0.5	
Independent	Edward Sweeney	1	0.1	
Total formal votes		1,738	99.2	
Informal votes		14	0.8	
Turnout		1,752	62.8	
Free Trade hold				

==== 1895 ====
1895 New South Wales colonial election: Waterloo
Party	Candidate	Votes	%	±%
Free Trade	George Anderson	799	46.8	
Labour	Ernest Banner	471	27.6	
Protectionist	John Norton	437	25.6	
Total formal votes		1,707	99.7	
Informal votes		5	0.3	
Turnout		1,712	72.5	
Free Trade hold				

==== 1894 ====
1894 New South Wales colonial election: Waterloo
Party	Candidate	Votes	%	±%
Ind. Free Trade	George Anderson	777	37.6	
Labour	Ernest Banner	724	35.0	
Protectionist	William Sharp	258	12.5	
Free Trade	George Taylor	185	8.9	
Ind. Protectionist	John Navin	125	6.0	
Total formal votes		2,069	99.2	
Informal votes		17	0.8	
Turnout		2,086	86.8	
Ind. Free Trade win		(new seat)		
