= 1949 Redfern state by-election =

Election result for Redfern, New South Wales, Australia

A by-election was held for the New South Wales Legislative Assembly electorate of Redfern on 8 October 1949 because of the death of George Noble (Labor).

The Cessnock by-election was held on the same day.

== Dates ==
Date	Event
9 July 1949	George Noble died.
12 September 1949	Writ of election issued by the Speaker of the Legislative Assembly.
19 September 1949	Close of nominations
8 October 1949	Polling day
1 November 1949	Return of writ

== Result ==
1949 Redfern by-election Saturday 12 March
Party	Candidate	Votes	%	±%
Labor	Kevin Dwyer	10,495	91.2	
Communist	Mervyn Pidcock	1,366	8.8	
Total formal votes		15,440	94.8	
Informal votes		854	5.2	
Turnout		16,294	77.9	
Labor hold		Swing		

== Aftermath ==
Kevin Dwyer did not serve for long, losing pre-selection for the 1950 state election and retiring from politics.

== See also ==
- Electoral results for the district of Redfern
- List of New South Wales state by-elections
