= 1882 Redfern colonial by-election =

By-election in New South Wales, Australia

A by-election was held for the New South Wales Legislative Assembly electorate of Redfern on 23 January 1882 because of the resignation of John Sutherland, ostensibly to accept an appointment to the Legislative Council, however he never took his seat in the council.

== Dates ==
Date	Event
29 December 1881	John Sutherland resigned, and summoned to the Legislative Council.
29 December 1881	Writ of election issued by the Speaker of the Legislative Assembly.
9 January 1882	Nominations
11 January 1882	Polling day
18 January 1882	Return of writ

== Result ==
1882 Redfern by-election Monday 23 January
Candidate	Votes	%
Francis Wright (elected)	1,704	67.5
John Williamson	819	32.5
Total formal votes	2,523	98.5
Informal votes	37	1.5
Turnout	2,560	47.8

== See also ==
- Electoral results for the district of Redfern
- List of New South Wales state by-elections
