= 1888 Redfern colonial by-election =

By-election in New South Wales, Australia

| ← 1887 | 8 September 1888 | 1889 → |

Electoral district of Redfern in the Legislative Assembly of New South Wales
- Turnout: 56.1%
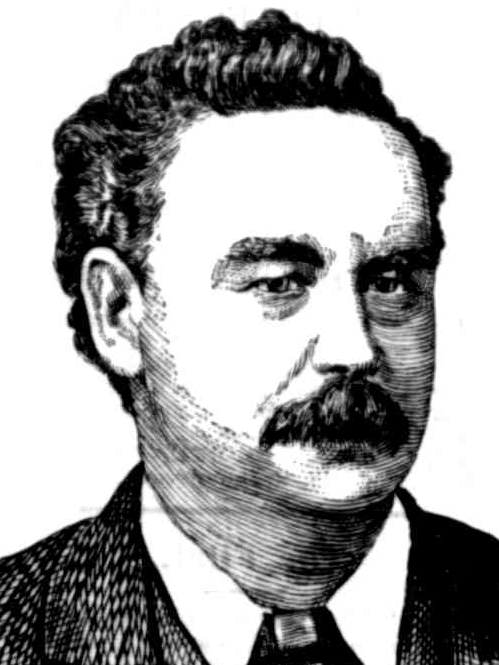
| | First party | Second party |
|---|---|---|
| | | FTP |
| Candidate | Peter Howe | John Martin |
| Party | Protectionist | Free Trade |
| Popular vote | 2,957 | 2,105 |
| Percentage | 58.4% | 41.6% |
MLA before election
James Farnell
Free Trade
Elected MLA
Peter Howe
Protectionist

A by-election was held for the New South Wales Legislative Assembly electorate of Redfern on 8 September 1888 because of the death of James Farnell (Free Trade).

== Dates ==
| Date | Event |
|---|---|
| 21 August 1888 | Death of James Farnell. |
| 30 August 1888 | Writ of election issued by the Speaker of the Legislative Assembly. |
| 5 September 1888 | Nominations |
| 8 September 1888 | Polling day |
| 24 September 1888 | Return of writ |

== Candidates ==
- Peter Howe (Protectionist) was a leather dresser and Mayor of Waterloo.
- John Martin (Free Trade) was a house and land agent and the son-in-law of the former member James Farnell. This was his second and final time as a candidate, having previously been unsuccessful in 1885 (Redfern).

== Result ==
1888 Redfern by-election Saturday 8 September
| Party | Candidate | Votes | % | ±% |
|---|---|---|---|---|
| Protectionist | Peter Howe (elected) | 2,957 | 58.4 | |
| Free Trade | John Martin | 2,105 | 41.6 | |
| Total formal votes | | 5,062 | 98.5 | |
| Informal votes | | 77 | 1.5 | |
| Turnout | | 5,139 | 56.1 | |
| Protectionist gain from Free Trade | | | | |

== See also ==
- Electoral results for the district of Redfern
- List of New South Wales state by-elections
