= Peter Howe (New South Wales politician) =

Politician from New South Wales, Australia

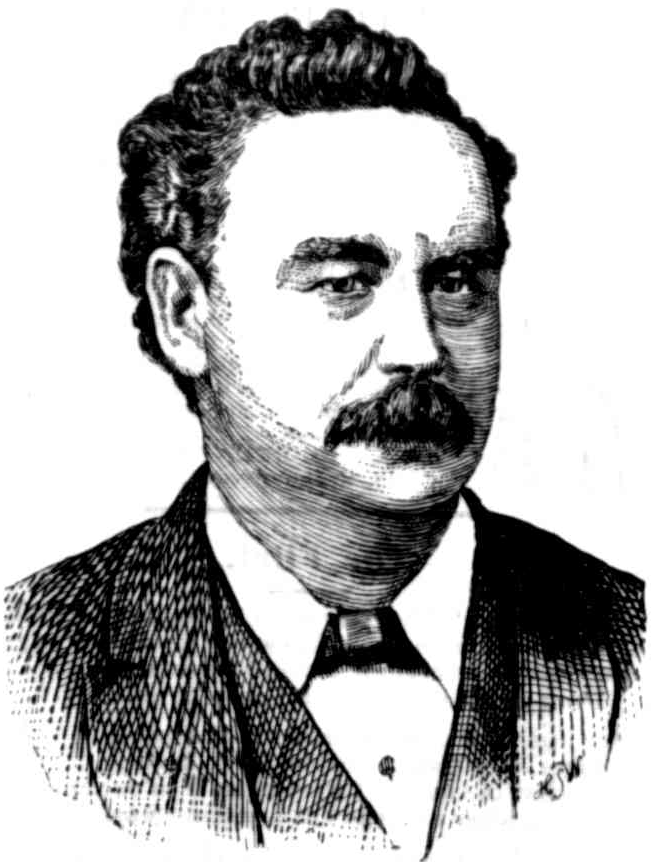

Member of the New South Wales Parliament for Redfern
- In office 8 September 1888 – 6 June 1891

Member of the New South Wales Parliament for Bourke
- In office 3 July 1891 – 1 July 1917

Personal details
- Born: 3 November 1854 Redfern
- Died: 1 July 1917 (aged 62) East Melbourne
- Spouse: Annie Emma Burchmore (married 1878)
- Children: 9
- Parent(s): William Bryant; Mary Lambert
- Criminal charge: Conspiracy to defraud
- Criminal penalty: Imprisonment for 7 years
- Criminal status: Released after 3 years and 7 months

(James) Peter Howe (3 November 1854 – 1 July 1917 ) was an Australian politician and convict.

== Early life ==
He was born in Redfern to mechanical engineer William Bryant and Mary Lambert. He was educated at Chippendale and worked as a leather dresser with Anderson & sons from the age of fifteen, becoming the branch manager by 1890. On 27 November 1878 he married Annie Emma Burchmore, with whom he had nine children, 5 daughters and 4 sons.

== Political career ==
He was an alderman for the Borough of Waterloo from 1886, and mayor from 1888 to 1889.

He was elected to the New South Wales Legislative Assembly as one of the members for Redfern at a by-election in 1888 as a Protectionist. He was defeated at the election for Redfern on 17 June 1891, but was returned to the assembly as one of the members for Bourke at the election on 3 July 1891. He did not hold ministerial or other office.

== Criminal conviction ==
Howe was a director of the Australian Mercantile Loan and Guarantee Company, which was placed into liquidation on 11 September 1891. On 8 October 1891 he was charged, along with James Miller, with conspiracy to defraud the Australian Mercantile Loan and Guarantee Company. On 21 October 1891 Howe gave his resignation to William Willis to be given to the Speaker of the Legislative Assembly. He was convicted of one of the three charges of conspiracy to defraud on 31 October and sentenced to imprisonment for 7 years. His resignation was not given to the Speaker until after his conviction, however accounts differ as to why. The Sydney Morning Herald stated that the resignation was to be given to the Speaker only if convicted which pointed "to a hope that the prosecution might fail, and that the resignation of the seat might be avoided", while the Australian Town and Country Journal stated that it was Willis' decision not to immediately give the resignation to the Speaker, for fear that it might prejudice Howe's trial. Frank Smith, another former member of the Legislative Assembly, was the managing director of the Australian Mercantile Loan and Guarantee Company from September 1889 until September 1890, and was convicted in February 1892 with conspiracy to fraudulently misrepresent the financial affairs of the company, and was also sentenced to imprisonment for 7 years.

Howe was released from prison in June 1895 after serving 3 years and 7 months.

== Later life ==
He later moved to Melbourne, where he established a leather business and also served on Preston Council. Howe died at East Melbourne in 1917 (aged 62).

New South Wales Legislative Assembly
Preceded by James Farnell	Member for Redfern; 1888 – 1891; With: William Schey / Charles Goodchap; William Stephen; John Sutherland / William Schey	Succeeded by Henry Hoyle; James McGowen; William Sharp
Preceded by William Davis; Thomas Waddell	Member for Bourke; 1891; With: Hugh Langwell; William Willis	Succeeded by Thomas Waddell
Civic offices
Preceded by Weeks White	Mayor of Waterloo; 1888 – 1889	Succeeded by Llewellyn Williams
