= Municipality of Alexandria =

Former local government area in New South Wales, Australia

Municipality of Alexandria Sydney, New South Wales
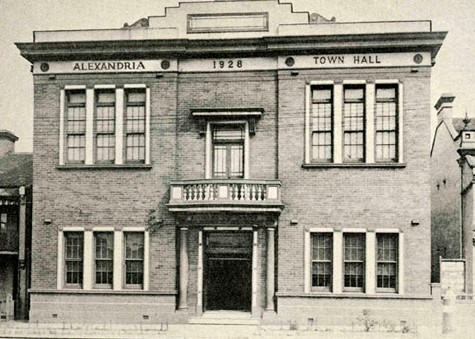
- Alexandria Town Hall, pictured in 1943.
- Coordinates: 33.910°S 151.193°E
- Population: 8,060 (1947 census)
  - Density: 1,919/km^{2} (4,970/sq mi)
- Established: 27 August 1868
- Abolished: 31 December 1948
- Area: 4.2 km^{2} (1.6 sq mi)
- Council seat: Alexandria Town Hall
- Parish: Alexandria
LGAs around Municipality of Alexandria:
Newtown	Redfern	Waterloo
Macdonaldtown/ Erskineville	Municipality of Alexandria	Waterloo
St Peters	North Botany/Mascot	Waterloo

The Municipality of Alexandria was a local government area of Sydney, New South Wales, Australia. Originally part of the municipalities of Redfern from 1859 and Waterloo from 1860, the Borough of Alexandria was proclaimed on 27 August 1868. With an area of 4.2 square kilometres, it included the modern suburbs of Alexandria, Beaconsfield and parts of Eveleigh, St Peters and Erskineville. After a minor boundary change with the Municipality of Erskineville in 1908, the council was amalgamated with the City of Sydney, along with most of its neighbours, with the passing of the Local Government (Areas) Act 1948, although the former council area was later transferred in 1968–1982 and 1989–2004 to the South Sydney councils.

== Council history and location ==
=== Early history of incorporation ===
The area that would constitute the municipality of Alexandria was first incorporated as the Waterloo Ward of the Municipality of Redfern in August 1859. Under the provisions of the Municipalities Act, 1858, 250 residents of the area including Alexandria signed a petition which was published in the Government Gazette on 17 January 1860, noting that "they have every reason for believing that their interests, as part of the said Municipality of Redfern, will be seriously injured by their incorporation with such Municipality, and are, therefore, desirous to be separated therefrom, and be and become a separate and distinct Municipality". The area was subsequently proclaimed as the Municipality of Waterloo on 16 May 1860 by Governor Sir William Denison.

=== Secession of Alexandria ===
In March 1868, a petition of 257 electors (including the first chairman of the Waterloo municipality, Edward Hawkesley) in the Western Ward of Waterloo was published in the Government Gazette arguing for the establishment of a "Borough of Alexandria", noting that "the rates received from the Western Ward have never been wholly expended in that Ward, and that no improvements of a permanent nature are in progress in the said Ward; nor has any sum been voted for that purpose during the past half-year [...] they believe that justice has not been done to them; nor can they hope that their interests will be consulted by the Council as at present constituted." The petition was subsequently accepted by the Government and the Governor Lord Belmore proclaimed the separation of the Borough of Alexandria and the reconstitution of Waterloo on 27 August 1868.

It was bounded by the Eveleigh railway yards and Boundary Street to the north, Botany Road in the east, Canal and Gardeners roads to the south and crossing through the suburbs of St Peters and Erskineville in the west. The first nine-member council was elected on 3 October 1868.

The first chairman of the Waterloo Municipality, Edward John Hawksley, was elected as the first mayor on 7 October 1868 and laid the foundation stone for the first Town Hall, built by local builder Thomas Shirley, on 8 December. However, Hawksley's term proved short-lived when the mayor of Waterloo, William Moon, disputed his election as an alderman for Alexandria in the Supreme Court. The case, based on electoral roll irregularities, was successful and Hawksley was disqualified from public office, leaving the council without a mayor until the election of Alderman Samuel Sparks on 7 January 1869. In a snap election called in February 1869 because of the vacancy, Hawksley was re-elected and was subsequently elected mayor once more.

=== Expansion and development ===
Over the next sixty years there were few alterations to municipal boundaries centred on the suburb of Alexandria. Rapid industrial and residential development occurred from the 1880s, with the population of the municipality recorded as 7499 in 1705 dwellings by April 1891. It was this development that was noted in an 1887 profile of the municipality in The Sydney Morning Herald:

"Like its immediate neighbours, Alexandria is a working man's borough, nearly all the dwellings being of a humble description. A large humber of industrial occupations are carried on, some being of a slightly unpleasant nature, so far as the olfactory nerves are concerned. Among others, may be mentioned-boiling-down establishments, tanneries, soap and candle works, and a varnish factory, the whole employing a considerable number of hands."

The Alexandria Town Hall in Garden Street was designed and completed by Ferdinand Reuss Snr in 1881, with major alterations completed by architects D. T. Morrow and Gordon in 1928. In February 1883 a petition was submitted to the Government for the division of the borough into three wards. The division of the borough into East Ward, West Ward and South Ward was subsequently proclaimed on 22 June 1883. In January 1886, owing to the growth in population in the South Ward, a further petition was submitted for the division of the ward into two, adding "Beaconsfield Ward". This was accepted and proclaimed on 16 June 1886.

By 1891, the tramline along Botany road was constructed, the road itself the major thoroughfare in the municipality being laid out in 1821. From 28 December 1906, following the passing of the Local Government Act, 1906, the council was renamed as the "Municipality of Alexandria". By 1943, when the municipality celebrated 75 years of existence, Alexandria was the largest industrial district in Australia, and known as the "Birmingham of Australia", a term coined by the long-serving alderman and mayor of Alexandria, Michael O'Riordan.

=== Later history ===
By the end of the Second World War, the NSW Government had come to the conclusion that its ideas of infrastructure expansion could not be realised by the present system of the mostly-poor inner-city municipal councils and the Minister for Local Government, Joseph Cahill, passed a bill in 1948 that abolished a significant number of those councils. Under the Local Government (Areas) Act 1948, Alexandria Municipal Council was merged, along with most of its neighbours, with the larger neighbouring City of Sydney which was located to the North.

== Mayors ==
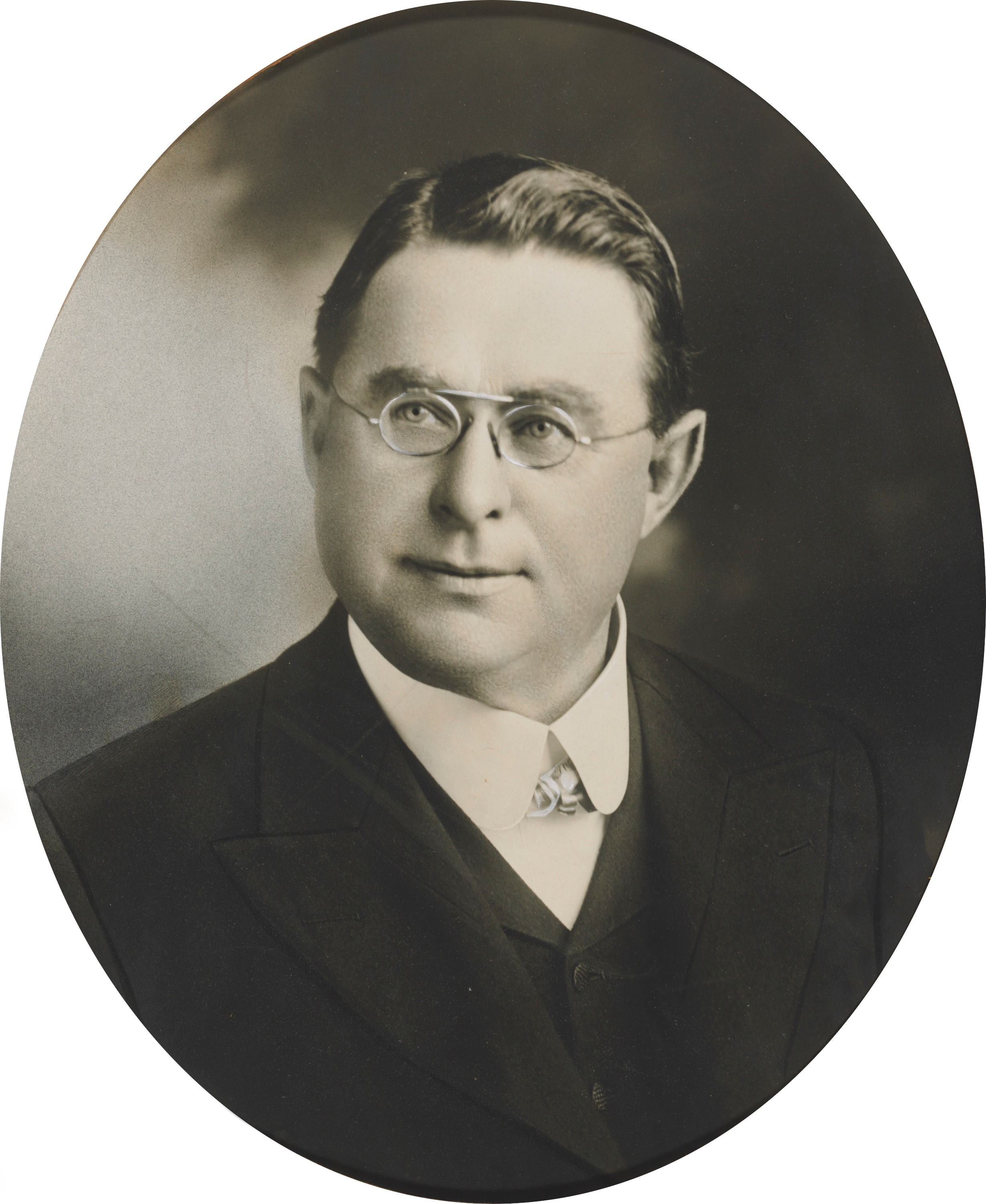
John Dacey, Mayor 1888–1890

Mayors	Party	Term start	Term end	Notes
Edward John Hawksley	None	7 October 1868	11 December 1868	
Samuel Sparks	None	7 January 1869	10 February 1869	
Edward John Hawksley	None	10 February 1869	10 February 1870	
William Bryant	None	10 February 1870	17 February 1872	
George Bretnall	None	17 February 1872	13 February 1874	
George E. Wood	None	13 February 1874	February 1875	
Stephen John Foskett	None	February 1875	12 February 1878	
Charles Brandling Henderson	None	12 February 1878	12 February 1884	
Charles Jesson	None	12 February 1884	8 February 1887	
Stephen John Foskett	None	8 February 1887	15 February 1888	
John Dacey	None	15 February 1888	14 February 1890	
John Turner	None	14 February 1890	11 February 1891	
James Ralph	None	11 February 1891	10 February 1892	
William Marr	None	10 February 1892	23 February 1893	
John Harden	None	23 February 1893	14 February 1895	
James Christie Horne	None	14 February 1895	13 February 1896	
Ernest Banner	None	13 February 1896	11 February 1897	
John Harden	None	11 February 1897	9 February 1898	
Michael O'Riordan	None	9 February 1898	15 February 1899	
Alfred Moles	None	15 February 1899	13 February 1900	
Ernest Banner	None	13 February 1900	February 1901	
Michael O'Riordan	None	February 1901	February 1902	
David Turnbull Brown	None	13 February 1902	12 February 1903	
James Ralph	None	12 February 1903	February 1904	
Frederick Charles Loveridge	None	February 1904	16 February 1905	
Michael O'Riordan	None	16 February 1905	15 February 1906	
Samuel Alexander McCauley	None	15 February 1906	February 1912	
Michael O'Riordan	None	February 1912	February 1914	
James Ralph	None	February 1914	3 February 1915	
Edward F. Lawson	None	3 February 1915	February 1917	
William Henry Wassall	None	February 1917	February 1918	
John Joseph Collins	None	February 1918	February 1920	
William Henry Wassall	None	February 1920	7 December 1922	
George James Stokes	None	7 December 1922	December 1923	
Joseph Rogers	None	December 1923	December 1924	
William Henry Smith	Labor	December 1924	December 1925	
William Charles Ellis	Progressive	December 1925	December 1926	
John Joseph Collins	Progressive	December 1926	December 1928	
Joseph Bowden	Labor / Labor (NSW)	December 1928	December 1931	
Richard Power	Labor (NSW)	December 1931	December 1932	
Charles Humphries	Labor (NSW)	December 1932	December 1933	
Samuel Chenhall	Labor (NSW)	December 1933	December 1934	
Arthur Reginald Horatio Perry	Labor (NSW)	December 1934	December 1935	
Richard Power	Labor (NSW) / Labor	December 1935	December 1936	
Samuel Chenhall	Labor	December 1936	December 1937	
Fred Green	Labor	December 1937	December 1938	
Arthur Reginald Horatio Perry	Labor	December 1938	December 1939	
Sydney Henry Gordon Alexander	Labor	December 1939	December 1940	
William Henry Smith	Labor	December 1940	December 1942	
Samuel Chenhall	Labor	December 1942	December 1943	
Hugh Vincent McConville	Labor	December 1943	December 1944	
Fred Green	Labor	December 1944	December 1945	
Arthur Reginald Horatio Perry	Labor	December 1945	December 1946	
John Joseph Collins	Labor	December 1946	December 1947	
Kevin Dwyer	Labor	December 1947	31 December 1948	
