= Alexandria Town Hall =

Coordinates: 33°53′53″S 151°11′51″E

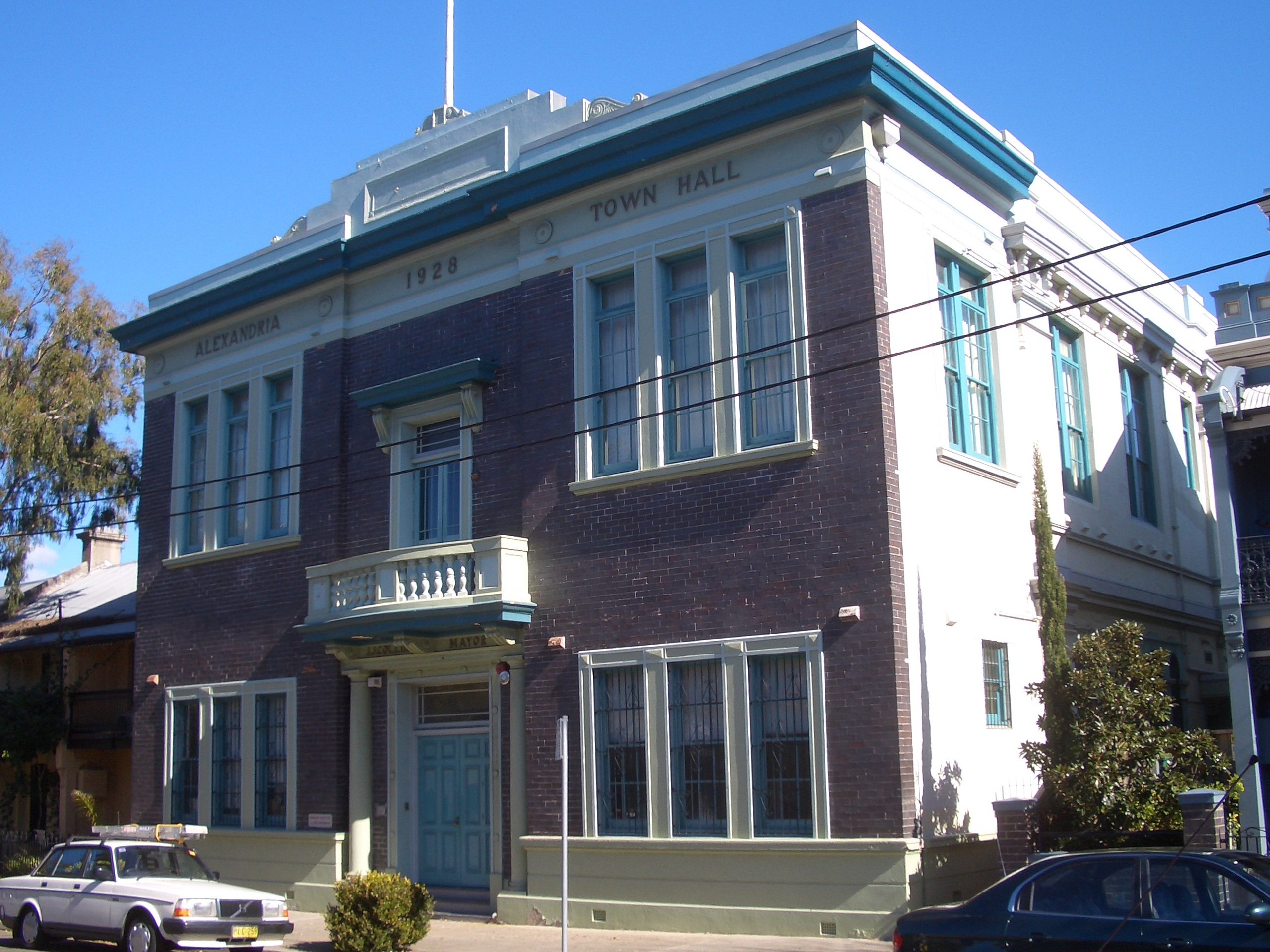

General information
- Type: Government town hall
- Architectural style: Inter-War Free Classical
- Location: 73 Garden Street, Alexandria, New South Wales, Australia
- Construction started: 1880
- Completed: 1881
- Renovated: 1927–1928
- Client: Alexandria Borough Council
- Owner: Sydney City Council (current)

Design and construction
- Architect: Ferdinand Reuss Snr (1881)
- Main contractor: Lander

Renovating team
- Architects: D. T. Morrow and Gordon (1928)
- Main contractor: E. V. Campbell (1928)

The Alexandria Town Hall is a heritage-listed town hall located in Alexandria, New South Wales, Australia. It stands at 73 Garden Street. It was built in 1880–81 in the Victorian architectural style by Ferdinand Reuss Snr. Significant alterations which changed the facade to an Inter-War Free Classical style were completed in 1928 by architects D. T. Morrow and Gordon. The Town Hall was the seat of Alexandria Municipal Council from 1881 to 1948 and since 1948 has been a branch library, community centre and council depot for the City of Sydney and the South Sydney councils.

== History and description ==
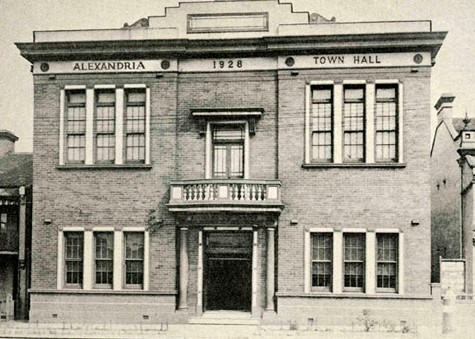
Alexandria Town Hall, pictured in "Alexandria, 'the Birmingham of Australia'", 1943.

The site of the Town Hall was acquired by the council in Garden Street in 1879 and Ferdinand Reuss Snr was commissioned as the architect. The Town Hall was completed and opened in June 1881 by the Mayor, Charles Brandling Henderson. By 1893 a two storey terrace, serving as a residence for the mayor, was constructed to the north of the Town Hall.

=== Later history ===
Following the amalgamation of the Alexandria municipality into the City of Sydney in 1948, the town hall ceased being a council seat and discussion occurred over its future use.

The hall was considered for use as a branch of the City of Sydney Library (nearby Waterloo Town Hall was also later chosen) and on 16 February 1951, Sydney Lord Mayor Ernest Charles O'Dea opened the Alexandria Branch Library, with the hall venue, a limited number of council offices and the rear depot retained. From 1968–1982 and 1989–2004, the hall came under the control of the Northcott/South Sydney Municipal Council and the City of South Sydney, and housed the offices of the Municipal Engineer's Department. The hall continued its use as a branch library until 1990 and in 1994–1997 the hall was also home to The Women's Library.

=== Heritage listing and conservation ===
The Town Hall, along with the "mayor's house" next door, is listed under the 2012 Sydney Local Environment Plan as "a representative example of a Victorian Town Hall modified with an Inter-War Free Classical style façade. It is representative of the work of two relatively prominent architectural practices of the nineteenth and twentieth centuries although that of the DT Morrow and Gordon practice predominate. It has important historical associations with the local community and local government in the area and serves as a representative indicator of the small inner-city Council areas which were subsumed into larger municipalities after World War II."

In March 2017, the Sydney City Council commissioned extensive restoration and conservation works to the hall, with Lord Mayor Clover Moore noting that "Alexandria Town Hall is an important civic building, we have a responsibility to make sure it meets the future needs of the community". The works, which included restoring the building's exterior and interior, were completed by the council in November 2017.

== See also ==
- List of town halls in Sydney
- Architecture of Sydney
