= The McKell Institute =

Australian think tank

The McKell Institute is an Australian public policy institute dedicated to developing practical policy ideas and contributing to public debate.

== History ==
The McKell Institute was launched in April 2012. It is named after William McKell, the 27th Premier of New South Wales and 12th Governor-General of Australia.

== Research ==
The McKell Institute released its first report in 2012, titled Homes for All: The 40 things we can do to improve supply and affordability.

The Institute conducts an annual survey, The State of New South Wales, which charts the views of NSW residents on a range of social and economic issues.

The Institute released a major report on productivity in November 2012, Understanding Productivity - Australia's Choice.

In July 2013, the Institute released a report around work/life balance titled The Case for a National Portable Long Service Leave Scheme.

In 2014, the McKell Institute was commissioned by Vodafone Hutchison Australia to compile Superfast Broadband - The future is in your hands, a report on telecommunications infrastructure and the National Broadband Network.

== Events ==
The McKell Institute hosts a range of special guest speakers from business, government and civil society who address the Institute on policy matters.

Guest speakers who addressed the Institute in 2012 include the Australian Prime Minister, Julia Gillard, who delivered a speech entitled 'Great Reforms Endure' and the Chair of Infrastructure New South Wales, former NSW Premier, Nick Greiner, who discussed the recently released NSW 20-year State Infrastructure Strategy, First things first.

In 2013, special guests included the then NSW Education Minister, Adrian Piccoli, the NSW Treasurer, Mike Baird, the then federal Finance Minister, Senator Penny Wong, and then federal Health Minister, Tanya Plibersek.

Subsequently, the McKell Institute hosted numerous public figures, both international and domestic, including former US Congressman Barney Frank, Former Italian Prime Minister Enrico Letta, former Barack Obama campaign advisor David Plouffe, Australian federal opposition Leader Bill Shorten, as well as other senior Australian political leaders.
