= Charles Goodchap =

Australian politician

Charles Augustus Goodchap (2 April 1837 – 20 October 1896) was a New South Wales politician.

Goodchap was born in Kent, England, and educated at Huntingdon Grammar School. He emigrated to New South Wales in 1853, and obtained a clerkship in the Colonial Secretary's office. He was transferred to the Lands and Works Department in 1856, and, in 1859, to the Department of Public Works. He became Chief Clerk for Railways in 1870, Secretary for Railways in 1875, and Commissioner for Railways in 1878. Goodchap retired from the Civil Service of New South Wales in 1888. He was replaced as Railway Commissioner by Edward Miller Gard Eddy (1851–1897).

He stood as a Protectionist candidate in the 1889 election for the Legislative Assembly seat of Redfern and was the fourth candidate elected. He did not contest the following election in 1891 due to business commitments.

Goodchap was appointed to the Legislative Council in May 1892, where he remained until his death.

Goodchap died unmarried in Potts Point, Sydney, on 20 October 1896.

New South Wales Legislative Assembly
Preceded by William Schey; James Howe; William Stephen; John Sutherland/	Member for Redfern; 1889–1891; With: Howe; Stephen; Sutherland/Schey	Succeeded by Henry Hoyle; James McGowen; William Sharp; William Schey
