= William Schey =

Australian politician

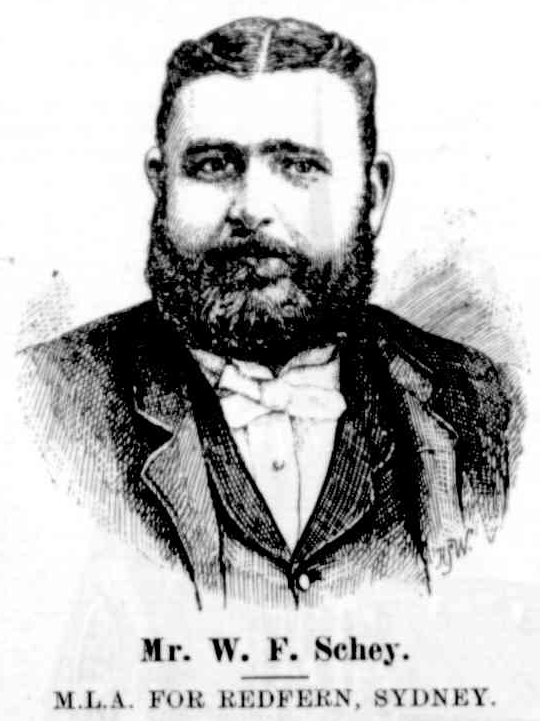

New South Wales Legislative Assembly
- In office 1887–1894
- Constituency: Redfern
- In office 1894–1898
- Constituency: Darlington

Personal details
- Born: 5 January 1857 London
- Died: 18 July 1913 (aged 56) Woolwich
- Party: Free Trade; Protectionist; Independent Labour
- Spouse(s): Louisa Charlotte Dorothea Weygang (married 1880)
- Children: 1 daughter and 2 sons

William Francis Schey (1857–1913) was an Australian politician.

== Early life ==
Schey was born in England and educated in London. After a short time in New Zealand, Schey arrived in Sydney as first mate of a ship in 1875. After tiring of work on the seas, Schey worked as a chainman for the Harbours Department then joined the railways, after becoming the first paid secretary of the Railways and Tramways Association.

== Political career ==
Schey entered the New South Wales Parliament in 1887, serving until his electoral defeat in 1898. Schey initially served as one of four Free Trade members for the Electoral district of Redfern in the New South Wales Legislative Assembly. He was not a strong supporter of free trade and had disagreements with the leader Sir Henry Parkes. For the February 1889 election he switched to be a Protectionist, however he was defeated, finishing last on the poll. He was returned to the Legislative Assembly 5 months later, narrowly winning the Redfern by election in July. He had such strong connections with railway employees and the Eveleigh Railway Yards he was dubbed the member for Eveleigh. He was re-elected to Redfern in 1891. Multi-member districts were abolished in 1894, and Schey stood as an Independent Labour candidate for the new district of Darlington, which included the Eveleigh Railway Yards. He returned to the Protectionist party, winning the election in 1895, however he was defeated in 1898. He did not hold ministerial or other office. Schey twice carried the "eight hour" bill through the Legislative Assembly only to see it defeated in the Legislative Council.

== Later life ==
In 1900 Schey was elected Chairman of the Royal Commission to Labor Matters. In 1905 Schey was appointed Director of Labor, a position he held until his death in 1913.

In 1895 Schey was concerned at the social toll of the 1890s depression. Schey was an engine behind the 1896 creation of a Government funded co-operative farm, established to assist men and their families who were victims of sickness and unemployment. Schey took so much interest in the co-operative training farm that the area became favourably known as Scheyville from 1907 onwards.

He died at Woolwich on 18 July 1913 (aged 56).

New South Wales Legislative Assembly
Preceded by Arthur Renwick; Thomas Williamson; John Sutherland	Member for Redfern; 1887–1889; With: James Farnell / Peter Howe; William Stephen; John Sutherland	Succeeded by Charles Goodchap; Peter Howe; William Stephen; John Sutherland
Preceded by John Sutherland	Member for Redfern; 1889–1894; With: Charles Goodchap / Henry Hoyle; Peter Howe / William Sharp; William Stephen / James McGowen	Succeeded by James McGowen
New district	Member for Darlington; 1894–1898	Succeeded by Thomas Clarke
