= Electoral district of Waterloo =

Former state electoral district of New South Wales, Australia

Waterloo was an electoral district of the Legislative Assembly in the Australian state of New South Wales, named after and including the Sydney suburb of Waterloo. It was created in 1894, when multi-member districts were abolished, and partly replaced the former 4 member electoral district of Redfern, In 1904 it was abolished and partly replaced by Alexandria.

== Members for Waterloo ==
Member	Party	Term
George Anderson	Ind. Free Trade	1894–1895
George Anderson	Free Trade	1895–1901
George Anderson	Liberal Reform	1901–1904

== Election results ==
1901 New South Wales state election: Waterloo
Party	Candidate	Votes	%	±%
Liberal Reform	George Anderson	1,125	50.9	+0.8
Labour	Ernest Banner	1,026	46.5	+25.9
Socialist Labor	James Morrish	52	2.4	
Independent	Henry Maynard	6	0.3	−0.3
Total formal votes		2,209	99.5	+0.3
Informal votes		11	0.5	−0.3
Turnout		2,220	65.2	+2.4
Liberal Reform hold				
