= Fred Green (Australian politician) =

Australian politician

Personal details
- Born: 12 November 1900 Sydney
- Died: 15 September 1983 (aged 82) Alexandria, Sydney
- Party: Labor Party

Frederick Green (12 November 1900 – 15 September 1983) was an Australian politician and a member of the New South Wales Legislative Assembly from 1950 until 1968. He was a member of the Labor Party (ALP).

Green was born in Sydney and educated to elementary level at state schools. He was the son of a metal dealer and worked variously as a brick carter, concrete labourer and law clerk. He joined the Labor party in 1927 and was an alderman on the Alexandria Municipal Council between 1934 and 1948. He was the mayor in 1937, 1938 and 1945. Green was elected to the New South Wales Parliament as the Labor member for the seat of Redfern at the 1950 state election after the sitting Labor member Kevin Dwyer lost party pre-selection and retired. He retained the seat for the Labor Party at the next 5 elections and retired at the 1968 election when the seat was abolished. Green was the Labor Party whip between 1953 and 1959.

The Green Square area of the former municipality of Alexandria was named after him, after a former park in the area was dedicated in 1938.

Civic offices
| Preceded by Samuel Chenhall | Mayor of Alexandria; 1937–1938 | Succeeded by Arthur Perry |
| Preceded by Hugh McConville | Mayor of Alexandria; 1944–1945 | Succeeded by Arthur Perry |
New South Wales Legislative Assembly
| Preceded by Kevin Dwyer | Member for Redfern; 1950–1968 | Succeeded by Seat abolished |
