= List of mayors of Waterloo (New South Wales) =

People who served as the mayor of the Municipality of Waterloo are:

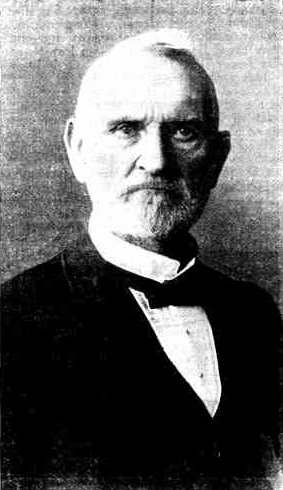
Patrick Hogan, Mayor 1877–1879, 1881–1883.

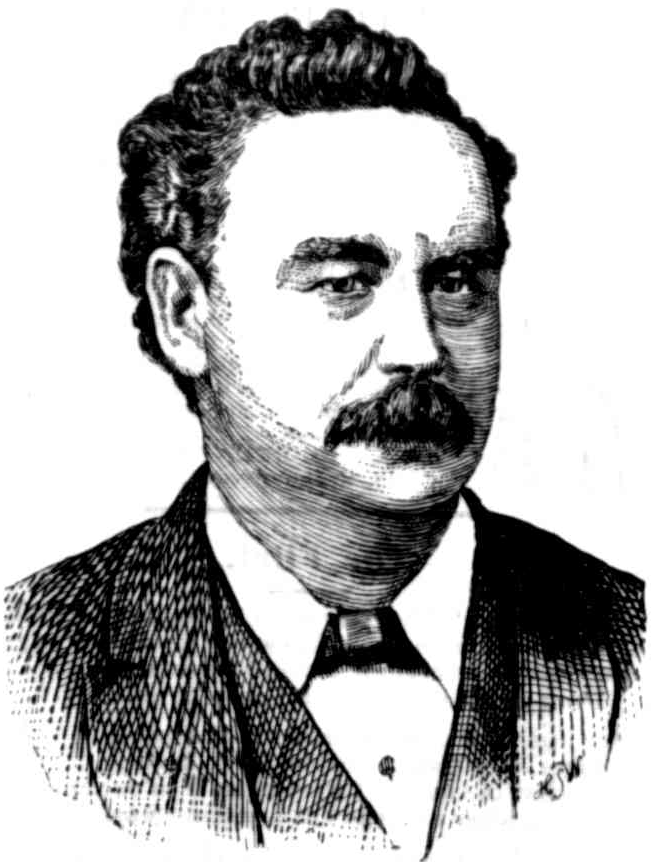
Peter Howe, Mayor 1888–1890.

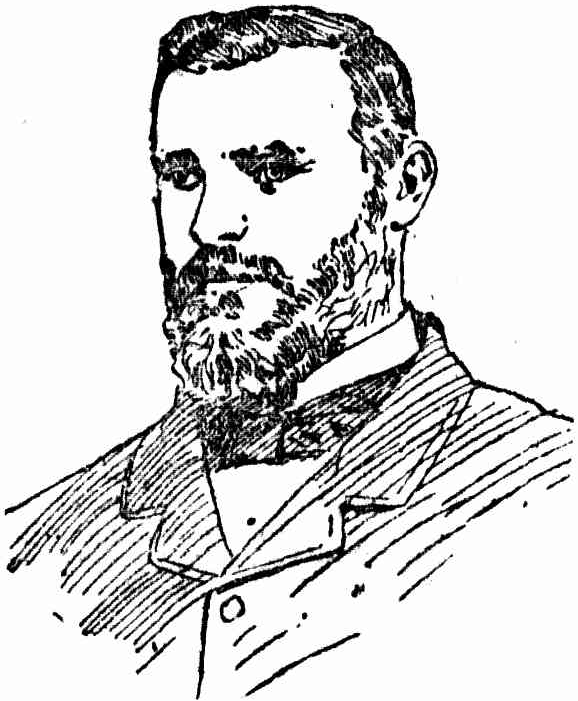
George Anderson, Mayor 1888–1890.

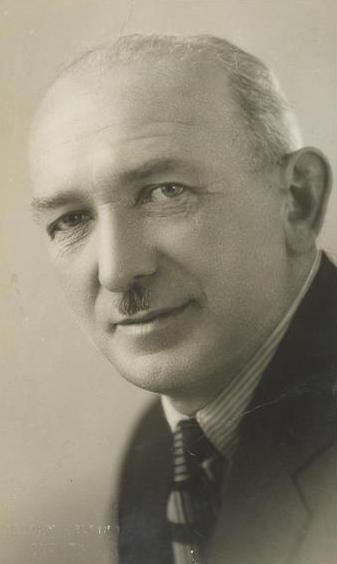
Dan Mulcahy, Mayor 1925–1928, 1929–1931, MHR for Lang 1934–1953.

| Years | Chairman | Notes |
|---|---|---|
| 1 July 1860 – 14 February 1861 | Edward John Hawksley | |
| 14 February 1861 – 16 February 1862 | Edward Byrne | |
| 16 February 1862 – February 1863 | John Geddes | |
| February 1863 – February 1864 | William Bryant | |
| February 1864 – 17 February 1865 | William Wilson | |
| 17 February 1865 – 23 February 1866 | John Oates | |
| 23 February 1866 – 22 February 1867 | Ebenezer Ollive | |
| 22 February 1867 – 23 December 1867 | William Bryant | |
| Years | Mayors | Notes |
| 23 December 1867 – 13 February 1868 | William Bryant | |
| 13 February 1868 – 9 February 1869 | William Moon | |
| 9 February 1869 – 15 February 1870 | James Wilcox | |
| 15 February 1870 – 11 March 1870 | Ebenezer Ollive | |
| 11 March 1870 – 23 January 1871 | William Moon | |
| 23 January 1871 – 19 February 1872 | Ebenezer Ollive | |
| 19 February 1872 – 15 October 1872 | John Faulkes | |
| 15 October 1872 – 13 February 1873 | James Henderson | |
| 13 February 1873 – 12 February 1874 | Cornelius Molony | |
| 12 February 1874 – 10 February 1875 | Ebenezer Ollive | |
| 10 February 1875 – 6 February 1876 | Thomas Moon | |
| 6 February 1876 – 17 February 1877 | Thomas Lloyd Fusedale | |
| 17 February 1877 – 12 February 1879 | Patrick Hogan | |
| 12 February 1879 – 13 February 1880 | Andrew Torning | |
| 13 February 1880 – September 1880 | Robert Vescys | |
| 21 September 1880 – 10 February 1881 | William Evans | |
| 10 February 1881 – 13 February 1883 | Patrick Hogan | |
| 13 February 1883 – 8 February 1884 | Matthew Smith | |
| 8 February 1884 – 5 February 1885 | William Evans | |
| 5 February 1885 – 9 February 1886 | William Briggs Cole | |
| 9 February 1886 – 7 February 1887 | George Anderson | |
| 7 February 1887 – 13 February 1888 | Weeks White | |
| 13 February 1888 – 11 February 1890 | Peter Howe | |
| 11 February 1890 – 12 February 1891 | Llewellyn Preston Williams | |
| 12 February 1891 – 11 February 1892 | George Anderson | |
| 11 February 1892 – 15 February 1893 | Thomas Lamond | |
| 15 February 1893 – 13 February 1894 | Thomas Collier | |
| 13 February 1894 – 13 February 1895 | Edward Thomas Walsh | |
| 13 February 1895 – 13 February 1896 | John Navin | |
| 13 February 1896 – 12 February 1897 | Llewellyn Preston Williams | |
| 12 February 1897 – 9 February 1898 | Thomas Lamond | |
| 9 February 1898 – 24 January 1899 | George Henry Greenwood | |
| 24 January 1899 – 15 February 1900 | John Dunning | |
| 15 February 1900 – 15 February 1901 | Joseph Parry | |
| 15 February 1901 – 12 February 1902 | Llewellyn Preston Williams | |
| 12 February 1902 – 12 February 1903 | John Navin | |
| 12 February 1903 – 11 February 1904 | Thomas Lamond | |
| 11 February 1904 – 17 February 1905 | Thomas Danks | |
| 17 February 1905 – 16 February 1906 | Charles Joseph Pittman | |
| 16 February 1906 – 11 February 1908 | Thomas Danks | |
| 11 February 1908 – 14 February 1909 | Thomas Ross | |
| 14 February 1909 – 7 February 1910 | John Dunning | |
| 7 February 1910 – 13 February 1911 | William Powell (ALP) | |
| 13 February 1911 – 8 February 1912 | Joseph Paxton | |
| 8 February 1912 – February 1913 | Albert Freckelton | |
| February 1913 – 9 February 1914 | William Powell (ALP) | |
| 9 February 1914 – February 1915 | Albert Dunning | |
| February 1915 – 16 February 1916 | Thomas Danks | |
| 16 February 1916 – February 1917 | Stephen Whitehurst | |
| February 1917 – February 1920 | Charles Joseph Lenton (ALP) | |
| February 1920 – December 1921 | John Joseph Connolly (ALP/Ind) | |
| December 1921 – 11 December 1923 | Albert Edward Harris (Progressive) | |
| 11 December 1923 – 30 December 1924 | John Joseph Connolly (ALP) | |
| 30 December 1924 – 29 December 1925 | William Wilcocks (ALP) | |
| 29 December 1925 – 10 December 1928 | Dan Mulcahy (ALP) | |
| 10 December 1928 – December 1929 | Joseph Bede Lynch (ALP) | |
| December 1929 – December 1931 | Dan Mulcahy (ALP) | |
| December 1931 – 28 December 1932 | Sidney Patrick Rouhan (ALP) | |
| 28 December 1932 – 22 December 1933 | Albert Edward Harris (Progressive) | |
| 22 December 1933 – 10 January 1936 | Joseph Bede Lynch (ALP) | |
| 10 January 1936 – December 1937 | Frederick Edward Finn | |
| December 1937 – December 1938 | Albert Edward Harris | |
| December 1938 – 18 December 1939 | John William Neilson (ALP) | |
| 18 December 1939 – 27 December 1940 | Ambrose James Cahill (ALP) | |
| 27 December 1940 – December 1942 | William Henry Grogan | |
| December 1942 – 17 December 1943 | Sidney Patrick Rouhan | |
| 17 December 1943 – 12 December 1944 | Richard Browning Chew | |
| 12 December 1944 – 7 December 1945 | Alfred Norman Pountney (ALP) | |
| 7 December 1945 – 17 December 1947 | Mary Veronica Neilson (ALP) | |
| 17 December 1947 – 31 December 1948 | Thomas Richard Pracey (ALP) | |
