= William McKell =

Australian politician (1891–1985)

The Right Honourable Sir William McKell GCMG QC
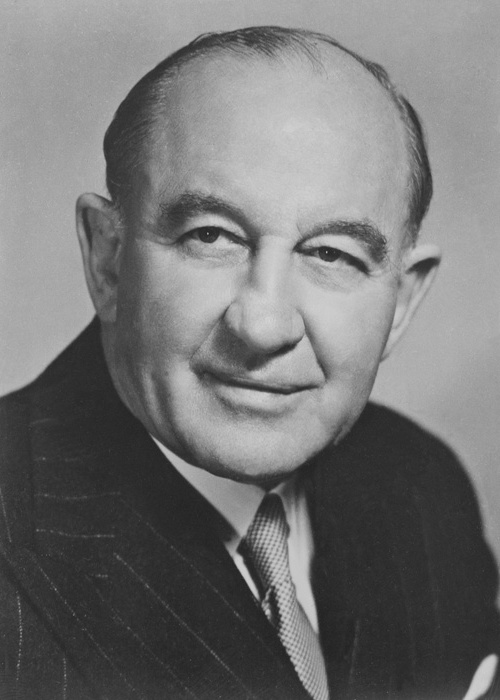
- McKell c. 1953

12th Governor-General of Australia
- In office 11 March 1947 – 8 May 1953
- Monarchs: George VI; Elizabeth II
- Prime Minister: Ben Chifley; Robert Menzies
- Preceded by: The Duke of Gloucester
- Succeeded by: Sir William Slim

27th Premier of New South Wales
- In office 16 May 1941 – 6 February 1947
- Monarch: George VI
- Governor: John de Vere Loder; John Northcott
- Deputy Premier: Jack Baddeley
- Preceded by: Alexander Mair
- Succeeded by: Jim McGirr

Treasurer of New South Wales
- In office 16 May 1941 – 6 February 1947
- Preceded by: Athol Richardson
- Succeeded by: Jim McGirr

14th Leader of the Opposition in New South Wales Elections: 1941
- In office 5 September 1939 – 16 May 1941
- Premier: Alexander Mair
- Deputy: Jack Baddeley
- Preceded by: Jack Lang
- Succeeded by: Alexander Mair

9th Leader of the Labor Party in New South Wales
- In office 5 September 1939 – 6 February 1947
- Deputy: Jack Baddeley
- Preceded by: Jack Lang
- Succeeded by: Jim McGirr
Cabinet positions
Minister for Local Government
In office 4 November 1930 – 17 June 1931
Premier	Jack Lang
Preceded by	Michael Bruxner
Succeeded by	Jim McGirr
Minister of Justice
In office 17 June 1931 – 13 May 1932
Premier	Jack Lang
Preceded by	Joe Lamaro
Succeeded by	Daniel Levy
In office 17 June 1925 – 7 June 1927
Premier	Jack Lang
Preceded by	Thomas Ley
Succeeded by	Andrew Lysaght Jr.
In office 20 December 1921 – 13 April 1922
Premier	James Dooley
Preceded by	Thomas Bavin
Succeeded by	Thomas Ley
In office 22 December 1920 – 10 October 1921
Premier	John Storey
Preceded by	Edward McTiernan
Succeeded by	Thomas Bavin
Electorate
Member of the New South Wales Legislative Assembly for Botany
In office 20 March 1920 – 7 September 1927 Serving with: Thomas Mutch; Simon Hickey; Frank Burke; John Lee; Bill Ratcliffe
Preceded by	Electorate expanded
Succeeded by	Electorate reduced
Member of the New South Wales Legislative Assembly for Redfern
In office 8 October 1927 – 6 February 1947
Preceded by	Electorate re-established
Succeeded by	George Noble
In office 24 March 1917 – 18 February 1920
Preceded by	James McGowen
Succeeded by	Electorate abolished

Personal details
- Born: William John McKell; 26 September 1891 Pambula, Colony of New South Wales
- Died: 11 January 1985 (aged 93) Waverley, New South Wales, Australia
- Resting place: Northern Suburbs Crematorium
- Party: Labor
- Spouse: Mary Pye (m. 1920)
- Children: 3
- Parent(s): Robert Pollock McKell; Martha Shepherd
- Education: Bourke Street Public School
- Occupation: Boilermaker; Unionist; Politician
- Cabinet: First; Second

Sir William John McKell (26 September 1891 – 11 January 1985) was an Australian politician who served as the 12th governor-general of Australia, in office from 1947 to 1953. He had previously been the 27th premier of New South Wales from 1941 to 1947, as leader of the Labor Party.

McKell was born in the small town of Pambula, New South Wales, but grew up in Sydney. He left school at thirteen, training as a boilermaker at Mort's Dock. McKell soon became involved with the union movement, and after a brief period on the railways began working full-time as a union secretary. He sided with the anti-conscriptionists during the Labor Party split of 1916, and at the 1917 state election defeated James McGowen, a former Labor premier who had been expelled from the party. In 1920, aged 29, McKell was Minister of Justice under John Storey. He also served as a minister under John Dooley and Jack Lang.

During the Labor Party's internal tensions in the 1930s, McKell came to be seen as a compromise candidate for the leadership of the party. He replaced Jack Lang as leader of the opposition in 1939, and became premier following Labor's victory at the 1941 state election. As premier, McKell oversaw both the war effort and the initial stages of post-war reconstruction, carrying out an ambitious programme of public works as well as various social reforms. He was re-elected with an increased majority at the 1944 election, making him the first Labor premier to win successive elections in New South Wales.

McKell had planned to retire from public life in 1946, but was instead convinced by Ben Chifley to become governor-general. His appointment was initially controversial due to its openly political nature; Sir Robert Menzies called it "shocking and humiliating". However, when Menzies returned as prime minister in 1949, they formed an amicable working relationship. Some of McKell's actions as governor-general were unpopular amongst his old Labor Party colleagues, notably his acceptance of a knighthood and his decision to grant Menzies a double dissolution in 1951. In later life, he served as a trustee of the Sydney Cricket Ground, and as a member of the Reid Commission, which drafted the Constitution of Malaysia.

== Early life ==
Bill McKell was born in Pambula, New South Wales, the eldest of four children. His father, Robert Pollock McKell, was a butcher who moved the family to Surry Hills in Sydney in 1898. Three years later he abandoned them. For the rest of his life, McKell concealed the matter by saying his father had died young. The family moved to Redfern, with McKell's mother working to support the family. He was educated at Bourke Street Public School in Surry Hills. McKell supplemented the family income by working part-time. As well as being a good student, McKell was a talented sportsman.

In 1906, McKell became an apprentice boilermaker at Mort's Dock at Balmain in Sydney. He joined the Federated Society of Boilermakers and Iron and Steel Ship-Builders and organised fellow apprentices to fight for improved conditions. Completing his articles, McKell worked for the New South Wales Government Railways from 1913 to 1914. He became full-time Assistant Secretary of the Boilermakers' Society in 1914.

McKell was also active in the Labor Party (ALP), which he joined in 1908. He was prominent in the Industrial Section, which took control of the Party in 1916. McKell became a member of the State Executive. When Labor split over conscription in that year, McKell was an anti-conscriptionist. James McGowen, MLA for Redfern and first ALP Premier of New South Wales, had been expelled from the party for supporting conscription. McKell defeated McGowen at the 1917 election.

In 1919, McKell bought a house in Redfern that was to be his long-term home. The following year, he married Mary 'Minnie' Pye (later Lady McKell). The first of three children soon followed. In 1933, McKell bought a property near Goulburn.

== Parliamentary career ==
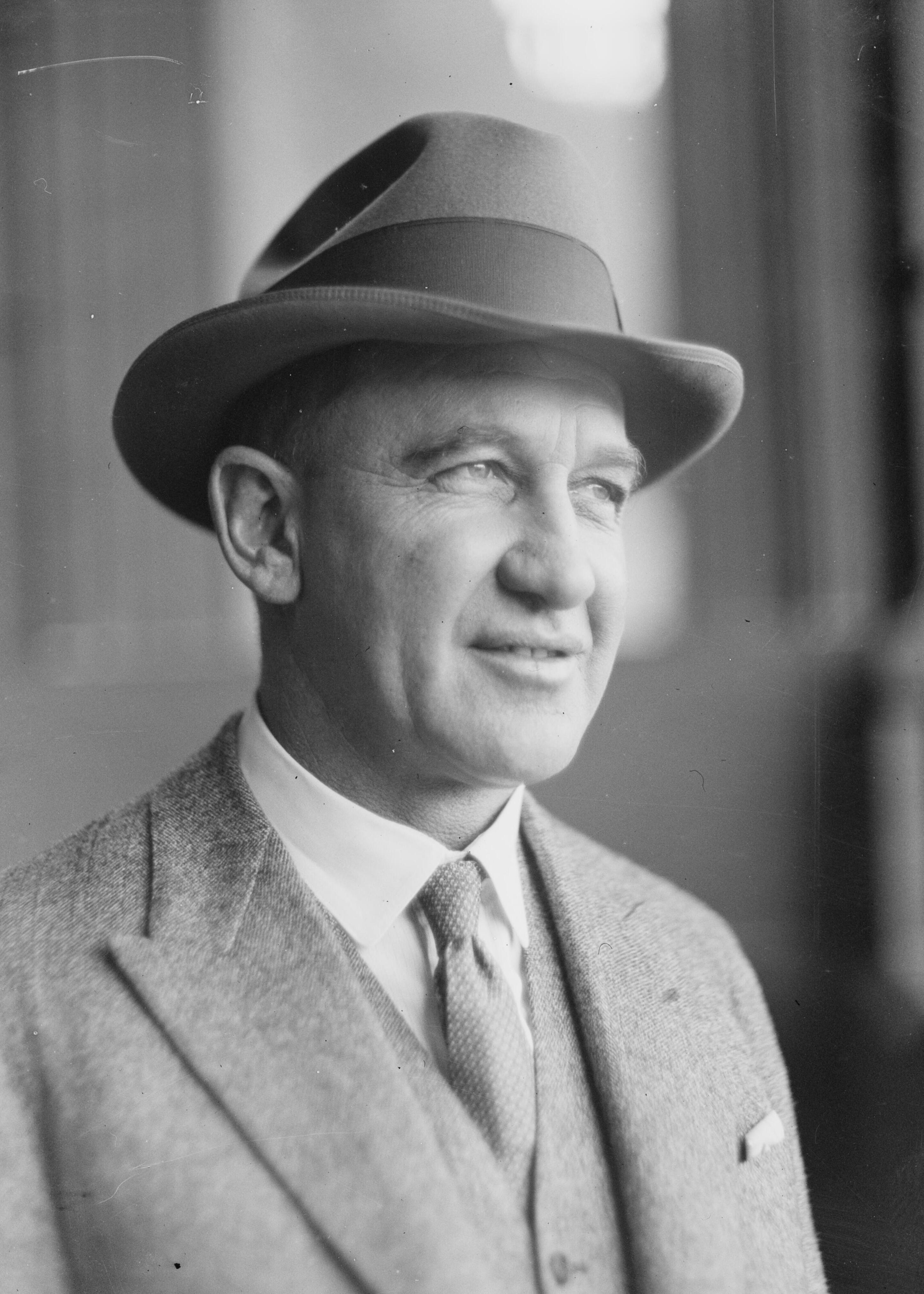
McKell in 1926

Except for the period of proportional representation (1920–1927), when he was a member for Botany, McKell represented the seat of Redfern until he resigned to become governor-general in 1947. As an MP, McKell studied for the Bar and was admitted in 1925.

McKell became Minister of Justice after Labor won the 1920 election and retained the position until the Government was defeated in 1922. When Labor regained office under John Thomas (Jack) Lang's Leadership in 1925, McKell returned to the Justice portfolio. He also became Lang's assistant at Treasury. In May 1927, Lang reconstructed his Cabinet with loyalists. McKell at first retained his post but was dropped on 8 June. When Lang won the 1930 election, McKell became a Minister but was relegated to the minor portfolio of Local Government. In June 1931, McKell again became Justice Minister, where he remained until Lang's dismissal by Governor Game in May 1932.

Growing resentment in the labour movement at Lang led to the formation of a breakaway Industrial Labor Party in February 1938 led by MLA for Botany, Robert Heffron. In 1939, the ALP Federal Executive intervened and a unity conference was held in August. Lang's opponents had a comfortable majority and took control of the Executive. In the Parliamentary Party ballot on 5 September 1939, McKell had 13 votes, Lang 12 and Heffron seven. In the next ballot, all of Heffron's votes went to McKell who became Leader of the Opposition.

== Premier of New South Wales ==
In the May 1941 election campaign, McKell outlined a programme of reforms for both city and country NSW. McKell contrasted this with United Australia Party Premier Alexander Mair's attitude that all social and other reform had to be postponed because of the war. The result was a victory for McKell, with Labor winning 54 of the 90 seats.

McKell set up a War Effort Co-ordination Committee chaired by himself. The Government built ships, roads, air strips and other defence works. NSW produced munitions and grew food. A vigorous civil defence and air raid precaution programme was instituted.

At the 1944 election, the Government won 56 seats, two more than in 1941. McKell was the first NSW Labor Premier to win a second consecutive term. On 26 March 1945, he broke Lang's record as the longest serving ALP Premier. The McKell Government achieved an impressive record in the social, industrial, planning, and environmental areas, including Kosciusko National Park and the Snowy Mountains Scheme.

On 13 February 1946, McKell announced that he was retiring from politics before the next election. Prime Minister Chifley appointed McKell governor-general. The official announcement was made on 31 January 1947. McKell resigned from Parliament and the Premiership on 6 February.

== Governor-general ==
In 1947 Chifley gained formal agreement from George VI for McKell's appointment as governor-general. This occurred only after very considerable opposition from the King and a detailed correspondence between them, also involving the incumbent governor-general (George's brother, the Duke of Gloucester) and the British Foreign Office, the details of which did not come to light for over 50 years. The objection was not personal (George VI had never met McKell) but centred on his being closely associated with a particular political party, and with a particular state. There was no precedent for a serving Australian politician, let alone a party leader and head of government, to be named governor-general, although there was a South African one and several former governors-general had strong ties with British political parties. In the end, the King had no option but accept Chifley's assurances of McKell's personal integrity and that the Crown would not be exposed to any political controversy.

Chifley was determined that the Duke of Gloucester's successor should be a native-born Australian, and he seems to have deliberately chosen a Labor man with a working-class background to make a political point. There was an outcry from the Liberal opposition and the conservative press: Robert Menzies called the appointment "shocking and humiliating". In a debate on a censure motion on 20 February, Menzies said the fact that McKell was actively engaged in politics when the appointment was announced (even though he had since vacated the political stage) was "a grave disqualification" which "strikes at the very foundation of the office of the governor-generalship, because that office in Australia should be as far removed from party politics as is the Crown itself in Great Britain". Chifley, in response, accepted full responsibility for the appointment, said that he offered no apologies, and "I am completely confident that as time goes on I shall have no reason to regret my action".

McKell kept a dignified silence on the matter of his appointment, rather than conducting a public defence of it. Nevertheless, Chifley publicly argued that any suitable Australian should be capable of being chosen as governor-general. Once McKell took office on 11 March, however, the continuing respect for the Crown and its representative meant that there was no further criticism. McKell carried out the usual round of his formal duties with dignity, behaved with unfailing respect towards the King himself, and succeeded in winning over all but the most inflexible. When Menzies succeeded Chifley as prime minister in December 1949, his relations with McKell were initially civil rather than friendly, but later on, the two men formed a cordial working relationship. Menzies even extended McKell's term by 14 months from its initial five years.

The most controversial moment in McKell's vice-regal career came in March 1951, when Menzies asked him for a double dissolution election. Labor had retained control of the Senate after the 1949 election, and the Senate had referred the Government's banking bill to a committee. Menzies argued that this constituted "failure to pass" in terms of Section 57 of the Australian Constitution. Many in the ALP, though not Chifley, thought that McKell should and would refuse Menzies a double dissolution, but the Governor-General agreed (with little hesitation) to grant one. McKell took the view that an election was necessary (since the Government's lower-house majority was still so big that there was no prospect of it losing a House of Representatives vote of confidence, such as in 1941 had ended Sir Arthur Fadden's far more vulnerable administration), and that it was for the electorate, not for himself, to determine whether the Senate or Menzies was right. He saw it as his duty to act on the advice of his prime minister. Sections of the Labor Party condemned McKell for granting the double dissolution, claiming he had 'ambushed' his old Party.

On 13 November 1951, McKell accepted a knighthood (Knight Grand Cross of the Order of St Michael and St George) from George VI, who personally invested him at Buckingham Palace while McKell was on an official visit to the United Kingdom. This caused considerable controversy in the Labor Party, as it was Labor policy to have nothing to do with knighthoods (a policy confirmed by the case of Queensland union leader Sir Jack Egerton a generation afterwards); but there was nothing Labor could do about it, since McKell had severed all connections with the party on assuming office. Also it was unprecedented and was still considered somewhat inappropriate, for a governor-general not to be at least a knight (many had been peers). McKell was the only Australian governor-general to be knighted during his term, until Quentin Bryce was appointed a Dame of the Order of Australia in March 2014.

McKell's official secretary for the first few weeks was Sir Leighton Bracegirdle, whose retirement was overdue after serving McKell's three predecessors over 16 years. He was succeeded by Sir Murray Tyrrell.

== Later life ==
McKell retired in May 1953. From June 1956 to 1957, he served as a member of the Reid Commission, which was responsible for drafting the Constitution of the Federation of Malaya (now Malaysia).

A longtime trustee and former chairman, McKell was a regular at the Sydney Cricket Ground. From the 1970s onwards there was a revival of academic and Labor Party interest in McKell and his legacy. Neville Wran (ALP Premier from 1976 to 1986) named a new state office building after McKell (the McKell Building, in Haymarket), and the party called one of its research bodies the McKell Institute.

McKell died in the Sydney suburb of Waverley in January 1985 aged 93. A memorial service was held at St Andrew's Cathedral. His widow, Lady (Mary) McKell, survived him by only six months. Both Sir William's and Lady McKell's ashes are interred at Northern Suburbs Crematorium, North Ryde.

== Biographies ==
- Clune, David (2021). Sir William McKell. Australian Biographical Monographs No 12. Redland Bay, Qld: Connor Court Publishing. ISBN 9781922449726.
- Cunneen, Christopher (2000). William John McKell: boilermaker, Premier, Governor- General. Sydney: UNSW Press. ISBN 0868405876.
- Easson, Michael, ed. (1988). McKell: the achievements of Sir William McKell. Sydney: Allen and Unwin. ISBN 0043303897.
- Kelly, Vince (1971). A Man of the People: from boilermaker to Governor-General. Sydney: Alpha Books. ISBN 9780855530167.

== See also ==
- First McKell ministry
- Second McKell ministry

Government offices
Preceded by The Duke of Gloucester	Governor-General of Australia; 1947–1953	Succeeded by Sir William Slim
Parliament of New South Wales
Political offices
Preceded by Edward McTiernan	Minister of Justice; 1920–1921	Succeeded by Thomas Bavin
Preceded by Thomas Bavin	Minister of Justice; 1921–1922	Succeeded by Thomas Ley
Preceded by Thomas Ley	Minister of Justice; 1925–1927	Succeeded by Andrew Lysaght
Vacant Title last held by Henry Hoyle	Assistant Treasurer; 1925–1927	Succeeded by Robert Cruickshank
Preceded by Michael Bruxner	Minister for Local Government; 1930–1931	Succeeded by James McGirr
Preceded by Joseph Lamaro	Minister of Justice; 1931–1932	Succeeded by Daniel Levy
Preceded by Jack Lang	Leader of the Opposition; 1939–1941	Succeeded by Alexander Mair
Preceded by Alexander Mair	Premier; 1941–1947	Succeeded by James McGirr
Preceded by Athol Richardson	Treasurer; 1941–1947	Succeeded by James McGirr
New South Wales Legislative Assembly
Preceded by James McGowen	Member for Redfern; 1917–1920	District abolished
Preceded by Thomas Mutch	Member for Botany; 1920–1927; With: Burke, Hickey/Ratcliffe, Lee, Mutch	Succeeded by Thomas Mutch
New district	Member for Redfern; 1927–1947	Succeeded by George Noble
Party political offices
Preceded by Jack Lang	Leader of the Labor Party in New South Wales; 1939–1947	Succeeded by James McGirr
