= Alfred Fremlin =

Australian politician

Alfred Reginald Fremlin (1832 – 14 July 1915) was an English-born Australian politician.

He was born in Wateringbury in Kent to William Fremlin and Elizabeth Morton. A fellmonger, he married Elizabeth Mennons around 1852; they had twelve children. He migrated to New South Wales around 1855 and settled in Sydney, working as a fellmonger; he would later become a Baptist minister. In 1880 he was elected to the New South Wales Legislative Assembly for Redfern. Re-elected in 1882, he did not contest in 1885, although he ran again unsuccessfully in 1887, 1889 and 1891. Fremlin died at Enfield in 1915.

New South Wales Legislative Assembly
New seat	Member for Redfern; 1880–1885; Served alongside: John Sutherland, none/Francis Wright	Succeeded by Arthur Renwick; Thomas Williamson
