= Henry Hoyle =

Politician and rugby league administrator in New South Wales, Australia

Henry Hoyle JP
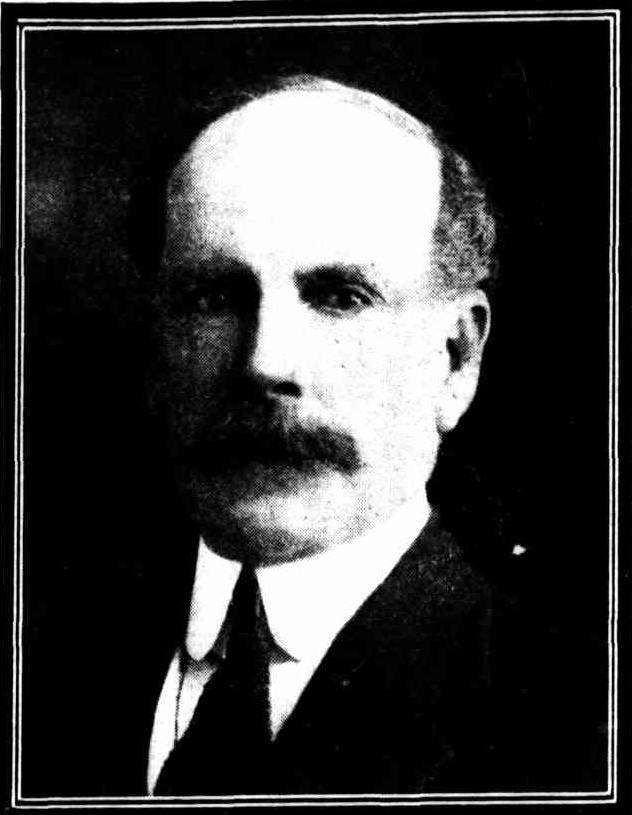
- Henry Clement Hoyle

Secretary for Mines
- In office 31 October 1916 – 15 November 1916
- Premier: William Holman
- Preceded by: John Estell
- Succeeded by: John Fitzpatrick

Minister for Labour and Industry
- In office 31 October 1916 – 15 November 1916
- Premier: William Holman
- Preceded by: John Estell
- Succeeded by: George Beeby

Member of the New South Wales Legislative Assembly for Surry Hills
- In office 14 October 1910 – 21 February 1917
- Preceded by: Sir James Graham
- Succeeded by: Arthur Buckley

Personal details
- Born: 20 November 1852 Millers Point, Colony of New South Wales
- Died: 20 July 1926 (aged 73) Vaucluse, New South Wales, Australia
- Party: Protectionist (1891–1895); National Federal (1898–1901); Labor (1910–1916); Nationalist (1917–)

Henry Clement Hoyle JP (20 November 1852 – 20 July 1926) was an Australian politician and rugby league football administrator of the 1890s, 1900s and 1910s. A life member of the New South Wales Rugby League, Hoyle is credited with helping to craft the rhetoric justifying its successful 1908 split from the New South Wales Rugby Football Union.

== Early life ==
The son of a sea captain, Hoyle was born in Millers Point, New South Wales on 20 November 1852. He was educated at a Balmain convent school and Fort Street Public School. At age 10 he began his working life in Balmain with Booth's sawmills. He was apprenticed as a Blacksmith with P N Russell & Co,. then worked at Mort's Dock in 1868.

Hoyle gained employment for the New South Wales Government Railways in 1876. While there he became a foreman and got married, setting up his house within the St Peter's, Surry Hills parish, of which he became a leading member. Hoyle was active in an 1882 iron trade strike. He was a founding member of the Railway and Tramway Service Association of New South Wales, becoming its first president in 1885.

In 1890 he was dismissed by the railways for his union activities. In 1891, as a member of the Protectionist Party, Hoyle was elected to the New South Wales Legislative Assembly for the four-member seat of Redfern. With the reduction of the size of the Legislative Assembly before the 1894 election, the Redfern electorate was reduced to being a single-member seat, and Hoyle was subsequently defeated by the Labour Party at that election. After his electoral defeat he was employed to write for The Freeman's Journal, and stood again for the seat of Redfern as the Protectionist candidate at the 1895 election but was unsuccessful. At the following election in 1898, Hoyle stood as the National Federal Party candidate for the seat of Sydney-Belmore, but was unsuccessful against the sitting Free Trade Party member, James Graham.

== New South Wales Rugby League ==
On 8 August 1907 at Bateman's Crystal Hotel, George Street, Hoyle chaired a meeting of fifty, comprising several leading rugby players and officials. The New South Wales Rugby Football League was founded and Hoyle was elected its first president. Hoyle then went about making arrangements for a New South Wales representative rugby team to host New Zealand's like-minded All Golds touring side.

He then chaired meetings around Sydney at which he gave speeches to help attract players and clubs to the newly created league, ending up with nine. These nine teams signed with the NSWRFL played in Australia's first season of rugby league football, the 1908 NSWRFL season. The 1908–09 Kangaroo tour of Great Britain was conducted during Hoyle's tenure with the NSWRFL as well. At the beginning of the 1909 NSWRFL season, the League, which was almost broke, met and kicked out its founders Hoyle, Victor Trumper and J J Giltinan. Harry Hoyle was later awarded Life Membership of the New South Wales Rugby League in 1914.

== Political career and later life ==
Hoyle joined the Labor Party before the 1910 election and became the member for the Surry Hills, defeating his former opponent James Graham. He was commissioned as a Justice of the Peace in 1911 and was also a Trustee of Taronga Park from 1912 until 1926. In January 1914, he was appointed as an Honorary Minister in the cabinet, charged with the duties of Colonial Treasurer, an office held by the Premier, William Holman, but was often referred to as the "Assistant Treasurer". He was promoted to Secretary for Mines and Minister for Labour and Industry in October 1916.

In November 1916 Labor split over conscription, when Premier Holman, and twenty of his supporters, including Hoyle were expelled from the party for defying party policy and supporting conscription. Hoyle joined Holman's grand coalition with the members of the various conservative parties which became the Nationalist Party but was not retained in Holman's new Nationalist ministry. He did not contest the 1917 election.

Hoyle died on 20 July 1926 in Vaucluse, New South Wales. He was buried at South Head Cemetery on 21 July 1926. His wife Maria died two weeks later.

Parliament of New South Wales
Political offices
New office	Minister without Portfolio (Assisting the Treasurer); 1914–1916	Vacant Title next held by William McKell as Assistant Treasurer
Preceded by John Estell	Secretary for Mines; 1916	Succeeded by John Fitzpatrick
Preceded by John Estell	Minister for Labour and Industry; 1916	Succeeded by George Beeby
New South Wales Legislative Assembly
Preceded by William Schey; Charles Goodchap; William Stephen; Peter Howe	Member for Redfern; 1891–1894; With: William Schey; William Sharp; James McGowen	Succeeded by James McGowen
Preceded by Sir James Graham	Member for Surry Hills; 1910–1917	Succeeded by Arthur Buckley
Sporting positions
New title	President of the New South Wales Rugby Football League; 1907–1909	Succeeded by Ernest Broughton
