= Municipality of Waterloo =

Former local government area in New South Wales, Australia

- Local government area
- Waterloo Town Hall on Elizabeth Street, c. 1916.
- Country: Australia
- State: New South Wales
- Established: 16 May 1860
- Abolished: 31 December 1948
- Council seat: Waterloo Town Hall

Area
  - Total: 3.4 km^{2} (1.3 sq mi)

Population
  - Total: 11,241 (1947 census)
  - Density: 3,310/km^{2} (8,560/sq mi)
- Parish: Alexandria
LGAs around Municipality of Waterloo
| Alexandria | Redfern | Sydney |
| Alexandria | Municipality of Waterloo | Randwick |
| Alexandria | North Botany/Mascot | Randwick |

The Municipality of Waterloo was a local government area of Sydney, New South Wales, Australia. The municipality was proclaimed on 16 May 1860 and, with an area of 3.4 square kilometres, included the modern suburbs of Waterloo, Zetland and Rosebery. The suburb of Alexandria was originally included as the Western Ward of the council but seceded as a separate municipality in 1868. After several attempts to amalgamate with various neighbours in the mid-1920s, the council was amalgamated with the City of Sydney, along with most of its neighbours, with the passing of the Local Government (Areas) Act 1948, although parts of the former council area were transferred in 1967 to the City of South Sydney.

== Council history and location ==
The area that would constitute the municipality of Waterloo was first incorporated as the Waterloo Ward of the Municipality of Redfern in August 1859. Under the provisions of the Municipalities Act, 1858, 250 residents of the area signed a petition which was published in the Government Gazette on 17 January 1860, noting that "they have every reason for believing that their interests, as part of the said Municipality of Redfern, will be seriously injured by their incorporation with such Municipality, and are, therefore, desirous to be separated therefrom, and be and become a separate and distinct Municipality". The area was subsequently proclaimed as the Municipality of Waterloo on 16 May 1860 by Governor Sir William Denison.

The first councillors were declared elected and held their first meeting at the residence of William Brown, at the corner of what is now Buckland and Botany streets, on 1 July 1860: Edward John Hawksley (elected Chairman), John Geddes, Thomas Rostron, Edward Byrnes, William Austin, William Bryant, John Oates, George Kitson and Jules Felix Charet. Initially established as one at-large constituency, on 5 October 1863 the council was divided into three wards: Northern Ward (Waterloo), Eastern Ward (Rosebery and Zetland) and the Western Ward (Alexandria).

The first permanent chambers of the Waterloo council was a cottage opposite the Cauliflower Hotel on Botany Road and the council later moved to a cottage in Buckland street, which was also the residence of the council clerk. The council continued to meet there until August 1868, when the council met in a room in Wellington Street, Waterloo. Following the enactment of the Municipalities Act, 1867, the title of chairman was renamed "Mayor" and the council became known as the Borough of Waterloo.

=== Secession of Alexandria ===
In March 1868, a petition of 257 electors (including the first chairman, Edward Hawksley) in the Western Ward of Waterloo was published in the Government Gazette arguing for the establishment of a "Borough of Alexandria", noting that "the rates received from the Western Ward have never been wholly expended in that Ward, and that no improvements of a permanent nature are in progress in the said Ward; nor has any sum been voted for that purpose during the past half-year [...] they believe that justice has not been done to them; nor can they hope that their interests will be consulted by the Council as at present constituted." The petition was subsequently accepted by the Government and the Governor Lord Belmore proclaimed the separation of the Borough of Alexandria and the reconstitution of Waterloo (Eastern and Northern Wards, which were abolished in favour of a single constituency) on 27 August 1868.

=== New Town Hall ===
In 1880 the council leased a block of land from the Cooper family on Elizabeth Street for a town hall. The Victorian Italianate town hall, designed by architect Edward Hughes of the firm Thornley & Smedley. However the construction of the Hall, undertaken by builders Bretnall & Poulton, went through several cost blow-outs, delays and enlargements, with a final cost of £3500 (from an original cost of £2600) with a £370 annual cost in interest payments. The council first met in the hall on 19 August 1882. The council continued to pay a rental of £10 per annum for the land to the Cooper family until 1912, when Sir William Cooper, 3rd Baronet, gave the council the freehold title to the land.

=== Expansion and development ===
As the suburbs of Sydney expanded south, the rural character of Waterloo gradually disappeared in favour of higher density and the growth of industry transforming it into a working-class area. This transformation was described in The Sydney Morning Herald in 1887, which noted that:

"Numerous industries are carried on in the borough, a very large amount of employment being provided for the residents. Among others may be mentioned wool-washing establishments, tanneries, rope works, soap works, bakeries, and breweries; and to this list may be added vegetable growing which in this locality is a very important item indeed. Waterloo, like one or two other suburbs, is essentially a working-man's borough, and it contains few dwellings of a superior description."

Following an unsuccessful petition to divide the council once more into wards in 1884, which came up against significant opposition, a petition signed by 115 electors was eventually submitted to the Government in December 1894 recommending the division of Waterloo into four wards. This petition was subsequently approved and proclaimed by Lieutenant Governor Sir Frederick Darley on 17 May 1895, with Waterloo divided into four wards: North Ward, East Ward, West Ward and South Ward.

William Powell, Mayor 1910–1911 and 1913–1914, dressed in the mayoral robes.

From 28 December 1906, following the passing of the Local Government Act, 1906, the council was again renamed as the "Municipality of Waterloo". In February 1909, council began planning for the South Sydney Hospital, with land provided in Zetland from the Cooper Family and a large bequest from local businessman and benefactor James Joynton Smith. In September 1909, Mayor John Dunning, passed through council, on a vote of 6–5, a motion to purchase a set of mayoral and town clerk municipal robes for the occasion of the laying of the foundation of the South Sydney Hospital by the Governor Lord Chelmsford on 21 October.

In June 1921, council submitted a petition to abolish the wards created in 1895, which was accepted and proclaimed by Governor Sir Walter Davidson on 13 March 1922.

=== Amalgamation proposals ===
The transformation of the area into heavy industry increased the infrastructure and maintenance demands on the council and by 1924, the financial state of the council was in such a dire situation that the council resolved to consider various proposals for amalgamation with one or several of their neighbours. In September 1924, Alderman Bunting moved through a motion in council to start negotiations with Redfern, Mascot, Botany and Alexandria councils for a proposed "Greater South Sydney" council.

However this proposal proved short-lived, as a few months later, in February 1925, the new mayor, Alderman Dan Mulcahy, pushed through a proposal for a conference with the City of Sydney to consider amalgamation with its largest northern neighbour. Mulcahy noted that this would contribute towards achieving a "Greater Sydney" council. The conference, convened in August 1925, however split this proposal along party lines, gaining the strong support of Labor councillors and the approbation of the conservative Civic Reform Association councillors, who took particular issue with the large costs involved. Given the strong support of the Labor-controlled city council, and given that Waterloo and Sydney only shared a small boundary along Moore Park, it was difficult for many to avoid the conclusion that the proposal was simply an attempt to secure Labor's hold over the City of Sydney. The Sunday Times editorial of 23 August 1925 expressed this sentiment in the strongest terms, going so far as to describe the proposal as a "put-up job":

"What the Labour Party is out to do is manifestly to bring into the city area such a mass of Labour voting strength as will insure continuity of office in the City Council for the Labour Party. Waterloo, we are told, is to be divided into two wards, each represented by two aldermen. Those four aldermen are, according to Caucus calculations, pretty sure to be Labour men, and we have no hesitation in saying that that and that alone is the reason why the Caucus is proposing to tag on to the city an area which is not even contiguous to the city proper, and whose absorption cannot be shown to be of any benefit to the ratepayers. Frankly we look upon the Waterloo scheme as a put up job, and we sincerely hope that popular opinion will be so aroused against it that it will not go through."

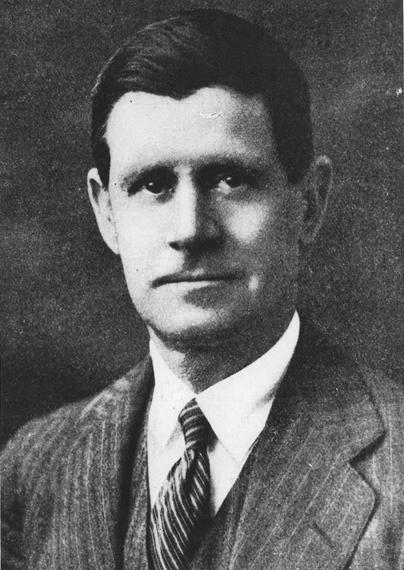
Thomas Bavin, Leader of the Opposition, later Premier, led the political opposition to the Waterloo bill in parliament.

On 2 December 1925, the Labor Lord Mayor of Sydney, Paddy Stokes, convened a meeting of the city council to approve the amalgamation proposal for consideration of the NSW Parliament, which was approved on a vote along party lines. The Sydney Corporation Amendment (Municipality of Waterloo) Bill was subsequently introduced and received its first reading in the NSW Legislative Assembly a few days later on 10 December. The final proposal moved that Waterloo would be absorbed into the City of Sydney, becoming the Waterloo and Rosebery wards, each returning two aldermen, with an undertaking for the city council to "spend £200,000, in four annual instalments of £50,000, in the reconstruction of roads and footpaths in the Waterloo municipality." The bill, again proving highly controversial, once more split along party lines, with the Leader of the Opposition, Thomas Bavin, noting to parliament that "The way we are being treated with respect to this Bill is an insult to Parliament. It is a grossly improper and unfair thing, and the Minister knows it" while Lord Mayor Stokes (who sat in parliament as the Member for Goulburn) declared that he stood "for the progress and development of the city. [...] We are in a position to reduce rates next year."

Despite passing the Legislative Assembly with the majority of the Lang Government, when the bill came for second reading in the Legislative Council, which did not have a Labor majority, it was defeated on a margin of 35 to 31. With the bill's defeat, Waterloo council moved on 8 June 1926 to send an amalgamation proposal to Alexandria, with Alderman Warner noting "If Alexandria doesn't take it, [Waterloo] will go bankrupt." It was this point, alongside allegations of criticisms made against Alexandria council by Waterloo aldermen, that led Alexandria to emphatically reject this proposal at their next meeting on 17 June. Alexandria aldermen even went so far as to pass a motion to "consign the communication to the waste paper basket".

=== Later history ===
In March 1940, three aldermen, former mayor John William Neilson, Ernest Navin and George Leslie Cohan, were each sentenced to three months gaol with hard labour for accepting bribes, where it had been found that they had taken bribes in order to register a company under the Noxious Trades Act 1902. The case, combined with the resulting vacancies, threw Waterloo council into chaos, with the mayor notifying the state government that they could not afford the by-elections for the vacancies and that quorum would be an issue until the next election. At the following triennial council election in December 1941, no Labor aldermen were elected on the 12 member council. At the following election in December 1944, the situation reversed, with 10 Labor aldermen elected including the first female alderman, Mary Veronica Neilson, who later rose to be mayor.

By the end of the Second World War, the NSW Government had come to the conclusion that its ideas of infrastructure expansion could not be realised by the present system of the mostly-poor inner-city municipal councils and the Minister for Local Government, Joseph Cahill, passed a bill in 1948 that abolished a significant number of those councils. Under the Local Government (Areas) Act 1948, Waterloo Municipal Council was merged, along with most of its neighbours, with the larger neighbouring City of Sydney which was located immediately to the Northeast.

== Mayors ==
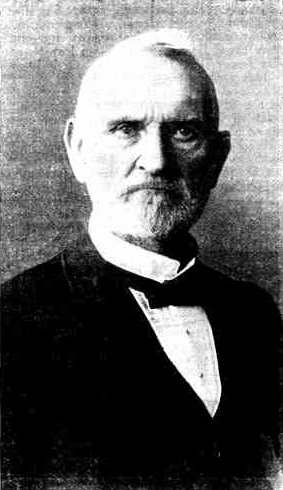
Patrick Hogan, Mayor 1877–1879, 1881–1883.

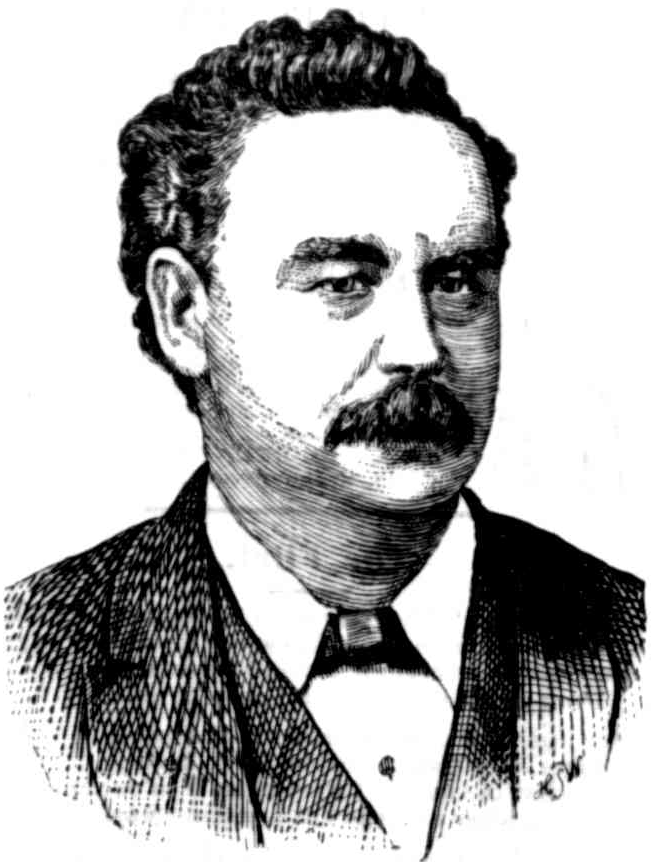
Peter Howe, Mayor 1888–1890.

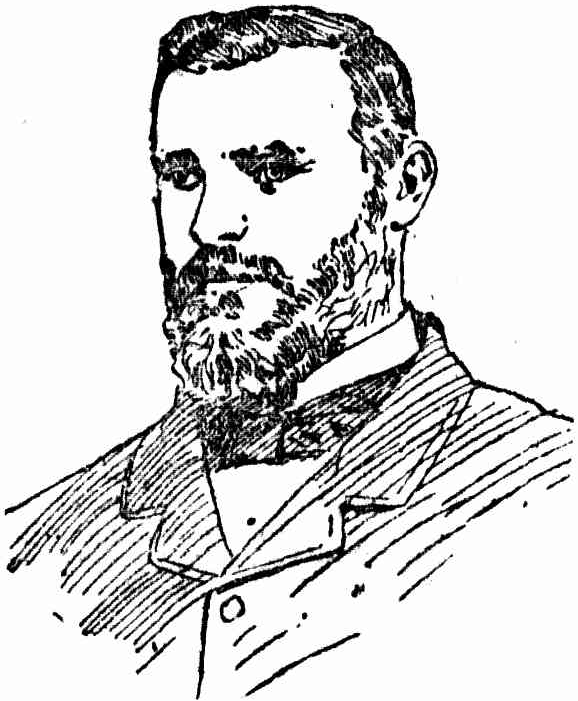
George Anderson, Mayor 1888–1890.

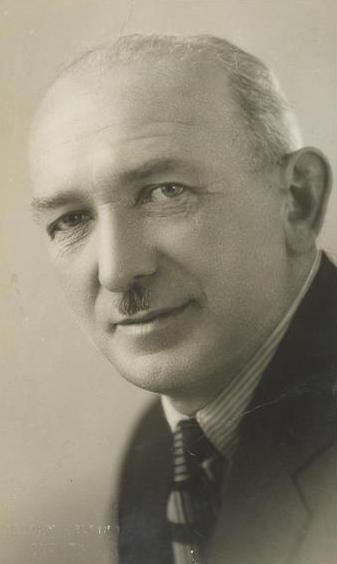
Dan Mulcahy, Mayor 1925–1928, 1929–1931, MHR for Lang 1934–1953.

| Years | Chairman | Notes |
|---|---|---|
| 1 July 1860 – 14 February 1861 | Edward John Hawksley | |
| 14 February 1861 – 16 February 1862 | Edward Byrne | |
| 16 February 1862 – February 1863 | John Geddes | |
| February 1863 – February 1864 | William Bryant | |
| February 1864 – 17 February 1865 | William Wilson | |
| 17 February 1865 – 23 February 1866 | John Oates | |
| 23 February 1866 – 22 February 1867 | Ebenezer Ollive | |
| 22 February 1867 – 23 December 1867 | William Bryant | |
| Years | Mayors | Notes |
| 23 December 1867 – 13 February 1868 | William Bryant | |
| 13 February 1868 – 9 February 1869 | William Moon | |
| 9 February 1869 – 15 February 1870 | James Wilcox | |
| 15 February 1870 – 11 March 1870 | Ebenezer Ollive | |
| 11 March 1870 – 23 January 1871 | William Moon | |
| 23 January 1871 – 19 February 1872 | Ebenezer Ollive | |
| 19 February 1872 – 15 October 1872 | John Faulkes | |
| 15 October 1872 – 13 February 1873 | James Henderson | |
| 13 February 1873 – 12 February 1874 | Cornelius Molony | |
| 12 February 1874 – 10 February 1875 | Ebenezer Ollive | |
| 10 February 1875 – 6 February 1876 | Thomas Moon | |
| 6 February 1876 – 17 February 1877 | Thomas Lloyd Fusedale | |
| 17 February 1877 – 12 February 1879 | Patrick Hogan | |
| 12 February 1879 – 13 February 1880 | Andrew Torning | |
| 13 February 1880 – September 1880 | Robert Vescys | |
| 21 September 1880 – 10 February 1881 | William Evans | |
| 10 February 1881 – 13 February 1883 | Patrick Hogan | |
| 13 February 1883 – 8 February 1884 | Matthew Smith | |
| 8 February 1884 – 5 February 1885 | William Evans | |
| 5 February 1885 – 9 February 1886 | William Briggs Cole | |
| 9 February 1886 – 7 February 1887 | George Anderson | |
| 7 February 1887 – 13 February 1888 | Weeks White | |
| 13 February 1888 – 11 February 1890 | Peter Howe | |
| 11 February 1890 – 12 February 1891 | Llewellyn Preston Williams | |
| 12 February 1891 – 11 February 1892 | George Anderson | |
| 11 February 1892 – 15 February 1893 | Thomas Lamond | |
| 15 February 1893 – 13 February 1894 | Thomas Collier | |
| 13 February 1894 – 13 February 1895 | Edward Thomas Walsh | |
| 13 February 1895 – 13 February 1896 | John Navin | |
| 13 February 1896 – 12 February 1897 | Llewellyn Preston Williams | |
| 12 February 1897 – 9 February 1898 | Thomas Lamond | |
| 9 February 1898 – 24 January 1899 | George Henry Greenwood | |
| 24 January 1899 – 15 February 1900 | John Dunning | |
| 15 February 1900 – 15 February 1901 | Joseph Parry | |
| 15 February 1901 – 12 February 1902 | Llewellyn Preston Williams | |
| 12 February 1902 – 12 February 1903 | John Navin | |
| 12 February 1903 – 11 February 1904 | Thomas Lamond | |
| 11 February 1904 – 17 February 1905 | Thomas Danks | |
| 17 February 1905 – 16 February 1906 | Charles Joseph Pittman | |
| 16 February 1906 – 11 February 1908 | Thomas Danks | |
| 11 February 1908 – 14 February 1909 | Thomas Ross | |
| 14 February 1909 – 7 February 1910 | John Dunning | |
| 7 February 1910 – 13 February 1911 | William Powell (ALP) | |
| 13 February 1911 – 8 February 1912 | Joseph Paxton | |
| 8 February 1912 – February 1913 | Albert Freckelton | |
| February 1913 – 9 February 1914 | William Powell (ALP) | |
| 9 February 1914 – February 1915 | Albert Dunning | |
| February 1915 – 16 February 1916 | Thomas Danks | |
| 16 February 1916 – February 1917 | Stephen Whitehurst | |
| February 1917 – February 1920 | Charles Joseph Lenton (ALP) | |
| February 1920 – December 1921 | John Joseph Connolly (ALP/Ind) | |
| December 1921 – 11 December 1923 | Albert Edward Harris (Progressive) | |
| 11 December 1923 – 30 December 1924 | John Joseph Connolly (ALP) | |
| 30 December 1924 – 29 December 1925 | William Wilcocks (ALP) | |
| 29 December 1925 – 10 December 1928 | Dan Mulcahy (ALP) | |
| 10 December 1928 – December 1929 | Joseph Bede Lynch (ALP) | |
| December 1929 – December 1931 | Dan Mulcahy (ALP) | |
| December 1931 – 28 December 1932 | Sidney Patrick Rouhan (ALP) | |
| 28 December 1932 – 22 December 1933 | Albert Edward Harris (Progressive) | |
| 22 December 1933 – 10 January 1936 | Joseph Bede Lynch (ALP) | |
| 10 January 1936 – December 1937 | Frederick Edward Finn | |
| December 1937 – December 1938 | Albert Edward Harris | |
| December 1938 – 18 December 1939 | John William Neilson (ALP) | |
| 18 December 1939 – 27 December 1940 | Ambrose James Cahill (ALP) | |
| 27 December 1940 – December 1942 | William Henry Grogan | |
| December 1942 – 17 December 1943 | Sidney Patrick Rouhan | |
| 17 December 1943 – 12 December 1944 | Richard Browning Chew | |
| 12 December 1944 – 7 December 1945 | Alfred Norman Pountney (ALP) | |
| 7 December 1945 – 17 December 1947 | Mary Veronica Neilson (ALP) | |
| 17 December 1947 – 31 December 1948 | Thomas Richard Pracey (ALP) | |
