= Kevin Dwyer (politician) =

Australian politician

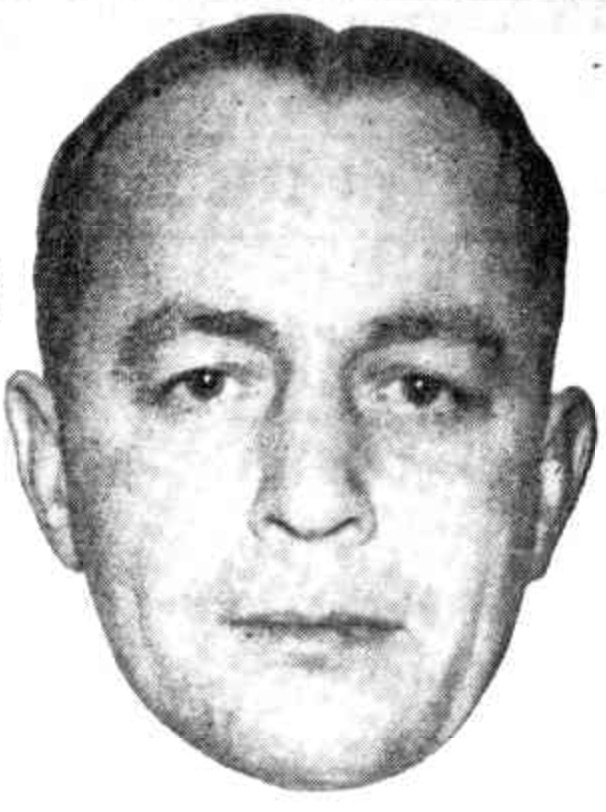
- Dwyer in 1954

Mayor of Alexandria
- In office December 1947 – 31 December 1948
- Preceded by: John Joseph Collins
- Succeeded by: Council abolished

Alderman of the Alexandria Municipal Council
- In office 6 December 1947 – 31 December 1948
- Constituency: East Ward

Deputy Lord Mayor of Sydney
- In office 6 January 1954 – 13 December 1954
- Lord Mayor: Pat Hills
- Preceded by: Frank Green
- Succeeded by: Anthony Doherty

Alderman of the City of Sydney
- In office 4 December 1948 – 1 December 1950
- Constituency: Newtown Ward
- In office 2 December 1950 – 4 December 1953
- Constituency: Alexandria Ward
- In office 5 December 1953 – 30 November 1956
- Constituency: City (Macquarie) Ward

Personal details
- Born: 19 July 1913 Goondiwindi, Queensland, Australia
- Died: 22 August 1982 (aged 69) Alexandria, New South Wales, Australia
- Party: Labor

Kevin Edward Dwyer (19 July 1913 – 22 August 1982) was an Australian politician and a Labor member of the New South Wales Legislative Assembly for 7 months in 1949–50.

== Early life ==
Dwyer was born in Goondiwindi, Queensland and was the son of a timberworker. He was educated at Christian Brothers' High School, Lewisham and in an example of nominative determinism became a dyer. Dwyer was elected as an alderman of Alexandria Municipal Council in 1947 and was its last mayor, prior to its integration into the City of Sydney in 1948. He continued as an alderman of the city of Sydney between 1948 and 1959 and was the Deputy Lord Mayor in 1958. Following his retirement from parliament he started a second hand timber yard and was a clerk with the Sydney County Council, the electricity supply authority for Sydney. He was a cousin of Rex Connor, a former member of the Legislative Assembly and a minister in the government of Gough Whitlam.

== Political career ==
Dwyer was elected to parliament as the Labor member for Redfern at the October 1949 by-election caused by the death of the incumbent Labor member George Noble. His only opponent was Merv Pidcock of the Communist Party of Australia and he won 91.2% of the vote. However, he lost the Labor pre-selection ballot for the 1950 state election to Fred Green and he subsequently retired from state politics when that election was held in May 1950.

Civic offices
Preceded by John Joseph Collins	Mayor of Alexandria; 1947 – 1948	Council abolished
Preceded by Frank Green	Deputy Lord Mayor of Sydney; 1954	Succeeded by Anthony Doherty
New South Wales Legislative Assembly
Preceded by George Noble	Member for Redfern; 1949 – 1950	Succeeded by Fred Green
