= Thomas Williamson (Australian politician) =

Australian politician (1853–1921)

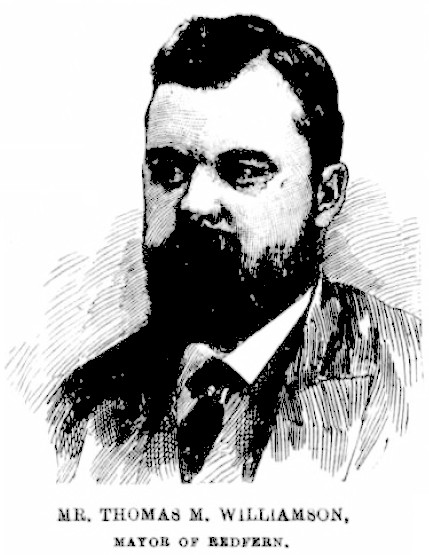
Sketch of Williamson in an 1888 publication

Thomas Michael Williamson (1853 – 16 December 1921) was an Australian politician.

== Early life ==
He was born in 1853, in Sydney, to typesetter William Williamson and Anna Maria Annesley, and grandson of Michael Williamson who both served as mayors of Redfern. He attended Lyndhurst College, serving as an articled clerk in his uncle's law firm, Williamson & Williamson, and was admitted as a solicitor in 1877. He later became a partner in the firm. On 8 October 1873, he married Annie McNamara, with whom he had seven children.

== Career ==
He was a candidate for the New South Wales Legislative Assembly for the district of Redfern at the 1882 election, winning a seat at the 1885 election. He did not re-contest the seat in 1887. He told a meeting of electors that this was due to medical advice, while a biographical article in the Australian Town and Country Journal attributes his retirement to the pressures of business. He was a Protectionist candidate at 1889 election, missing a seat by less than 100 votes.

He served as an alderman of Redfern from 1882 to 1888 when he was elected Mayor, serving a one year term to February 1889.

Williamson had moved to Rydalmere in 1886, and in 1891 successfully organised a petition to divide the Borough of Dundas. He was elected one of 6 aldermen on the resulting Borough of Ermington and Rydalmere, serving as mayor from 1891 until 1893.

In 1894, he was struck off the roll of solicitors as he had misappropriated £776, equivalent to A$142,110 in 2022, from a client. He unsuccessfully applied to be re-admitted in November 1896, but was allowed to be employed as a solicitor's clerk.

Some time after November 1896, he moved to Western Australia, where he was a commercial agent, until his death in Perth, on 16 December 1921, aged 67 or 68. The coroner found that Williamson had committed suicide by taking cyanide.

New South Wales Legislative Assembly
Preceded by Alfred Fremlin; Francis Wright	Member for Redfern; 1885 – 1887; With: Arthur Renwick; John Sutherland	Succeeded by James Farnell; William Schey; William Stephen
Civic offices
Preceded by Edwin Berry	Mayor of Redfern; 1888 – 1889	Succeeded by John Crowe
New office	Mayor of Ermington and Rydalmere; 1891 – 1893	Succeeded by Nelson Kirby
