= William Sharp (Australian politician) =

Australian politician

William Henry Sharp (26 October 1844 – 4 October 1929) was an English-born Australian politician.

== Career ==
He was born in London, the son of a clergyman. He was educated at public school and was apprenticed to government printers until 1873, when he migrated to the United States. He worked in Boston and Chicago and was a member of the Typographical Association. In 1874 he returned to London, joining the London Society of Compositors. He moved to Australia for health reasons in 1887, joining the Sydney Typographical Association and serving as a delegate to the Trades and Labour Council and as that body's president in 1891. In 1891 he was elected to the New South Wales Legislative Assembly for Redfern, representing the new Labor Party, but by 1894 disagreements about the pledge had resulted in him running, unsuccessfully, as a Protectionist. Sharp died at Mosman in 1929.

New South Wales Legislative Assembly
Preceded by Charles Goodchap; James Howe; William Stephen	Member for Redfern; 1891–1894; Served alongside: Hoyle, McGowen, Schey	Succeeded by James McGowen
