= George Noble (politician) =

Australian politician (1891–1949)

Personal details
- Born: 3 February 1891 Darlington, New South Wales
- Died: 9 July 1949 (aged 58) Kogarah, New South Wales
- Party: Labor Party

George Walter Harry Noble (3 February 1891 – 9 July 1949) was an Australian plumber, gasfitter, politician and member of the New South Wales Legislative Assembly for 1 term from 1947 to 1949. He was a member of the Labor Party.

== Early life ==
Noble was born in Darlington, New South Wales and educated to elementary level. He was an early and notable player of Rugby league after the sport was established in Sydney in 1908. Noble was apprenticed as a plumber and gas-fitter with the New South Wales Government Railways and employed as a gas-fitter from 1913 until he was dismissed during the Australian General Strike of 1917. He was subsequently re-employed with decreased seniority. Noble was elected as an alderman of Alexandria Municipal Council between 1928 and 1932. A member of the Australian Labor Party from the age of 17, he was a member of William McKell's campaign committee for 21 years.

== State Parliament ==
In February 1947 the Premier and member for Redfern, William McKell resigned to take the position of Governor-General. Due to the proximity of the dissolution of the 35th parliament, a by-election was not held. Noble successfully contested Labor pre-selection for Redfern and was elected to parliament at the May 1947 election. However, he died suddenly 26 months after his election. He did not hold party, parliamentary or ministerial office.

The Harry Noble Reserve in Erskineville was named in honour of Noble in 1960.

New South Wales Legislative Assembly
Preceded by William McKell	Member for Redfern; 1947 - 1949	Succeeded by Kevin Dwyer
