= John Sutherland (New South Wales politician) =

Australian politician

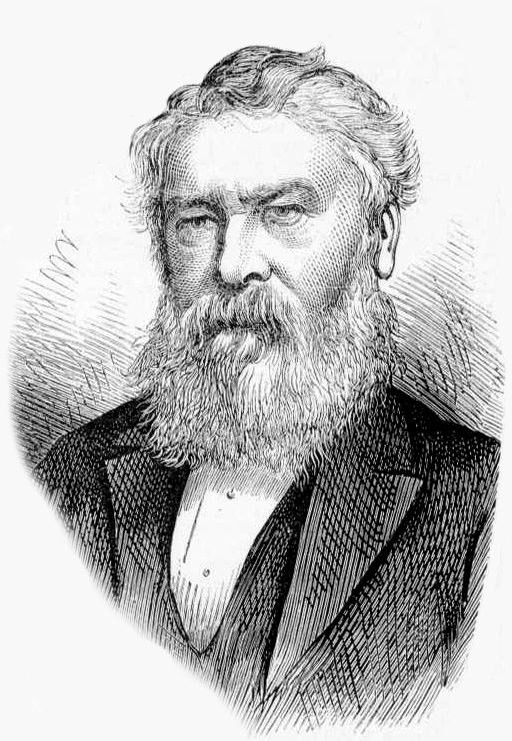
John Sutherland, 1874 engraving

John Sutherland (16 February 1816 – 23 June 1889) was a builder and politician in colonial New South Wales.

== Early life ==
Sutherland was born near Wick, Caithness in Scotland, the son of a crofter, John Sutherland, and his wife Louisa. Sutherland had little formal education and trained as carpenter. He emigrated to New South Wales as an unassisted migrant, arriving in 1838 and set himself up as a successful builder. Sutherland married Mary Ogilvie, daughter of Captain Ogilvie of Campbelltown, on 2 May 1839. They had two sons, who died young, and a daughter.

In 1863 with John Frazer and William Manson he took up 287 square miles near Port Denison, Queensland. He later held another 250 square miles in the South Kennedy district as well as Lindisfarne in the North Gregory district. In 1873 with Sir Henry Parkes he took up 3,760 acres of mineral leases near Jamberoo and held another 408 under conditional purchase but failed to mine coal there. By 1878 he was a partner in the Lithgow Valley Iron Mining Company.

== Civic and political career ==
Having been very successful as a builder, he was elected an alderman of the Sydney City Council for Phillip Ward on 30 April 1857 until 30 November 1868 and again on 1 December 1871 until July 1872. He was mayor in 1861. His principal municipal work was in connection with the sewerage of the metropolis.

Professing himself a 'workingman's MP', in 1860 he was elected to the New South Wales Legislative Assembly for the district of Paddington, which included the suburbs of Paddington and Redfern. He was Secretary for Public Works in the second Robertson and fifth Cowper ministries from October 1868 to December 1870, in the first Parkes ministry from May 1872 to February 1875 and in the Farnell ministry from December 1877 to December 1878. In October 1881 he was one of nine royal commissioners appointed to enquire into the working of the Friendly Societies Act.

He held Paddington until February 1880, when he resigned because his company had a government contract re-distribution. At the 1880 election he chose to contest the new district of Redfern, before resigning in December 1881, when he was appointed to the Legislative Council. He did not take his seat in the council, and formally resigned in November 1882, in order to contest Redfern at the 1882 election, representing Redfern until his death in 1889. He was Sectretary for Public Works for a fifth time in the fourth Parkes ministry from January 1887 to January 1889.

Sutherland was commissioned as a justice of the peace and was a magistrate for Sydney. From the 1860s he was a Vice-President of the Sydney Mechanics' School of Arts and a member of the Benevolent Society of New South Wales. Sutherland was also a trustee of three Mutual Benefit Building Societies and the Savings Bank of New South Wales, and Chairman of the Australian Mutual Fire Insurance Society. From 1883, he was a member of the Board of Technical Education. He was Vice-President of the Highland Society of New South Wales, as well as a freemason associated with the Oddfellows and Foresters' Friendly Societies.

== Death ==
He died from diabetes on 23 June 1889 (aged 73).

Sutherland Dock at Cockatoo Island is named for him.

Parliament of New South Wales
Political offices
Preceded by James Byrnes	Secretary for Public Works; 1868 – 1870	Succeeded by James Byrnes
Preceded by James Byrnes	Secretary for Public Works; 1872 – 1875	Succeeded by John Lackey
Preceded by Edward Combes	Secretary for Public Works; 1877 – 1878	Succeeded by John Lackey
Preceded by William Lyne	Secretary for Public Works; 1887 – 1889	Succeeded by James Fletcher
New South Wales Legislative Assembly
Preceded by Daniel Cooper	Member for Paddington; 1860 – 1880	Succeeded by William Hezlet
New district	Member for Redfern; 1880 – 1882; With: Alfred Fremlin	Succeeded by Francis Wright
Preceded by Alfred Fremlin; Francis Wright	Member for Redfern; 1882 – 1889; With: Fremlin / Renwick / Stephen; Wright / Williamson / Schey / Goodchap none / Farnell / Howe	Succeeded by William Schey
Civic offices
Preceded by James Murphy	Mayor of Sydney; 1861	Succeeded by James Oatley
