= George Anderson (Australian politician) =

Australian politician

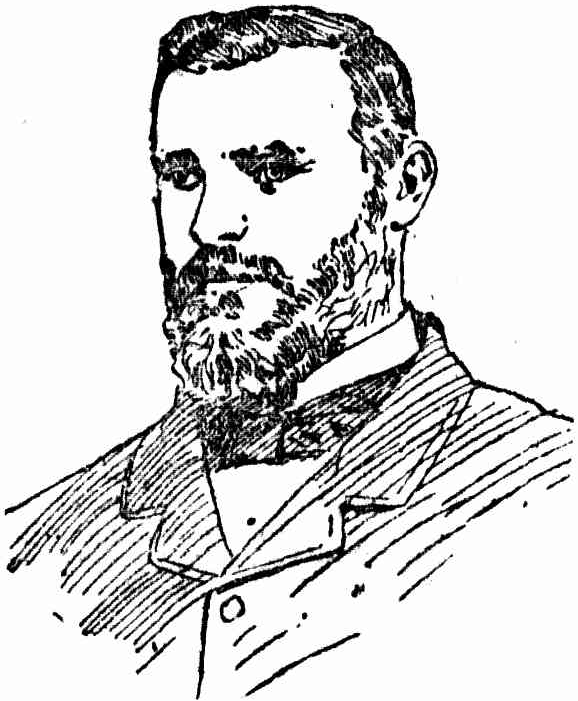

George Anderson (1 November 1844 – 13 April 1919) was an English-born Australian politician.

He was born in Lancaster to merchant navy captain Eugene Anderson and Susan Morton. He received a primary education before being apprenticed to a carpenter in 1858. He migrated to Auckland, New Zealand, in 1859, where he served in the invasion of the Waikato from 1863 to 1864. In 1861, he married Mary Anne Walsh. After moving to New South Wales in 1866, he joined the police force and in 1888 established scouring works at Rose Valley. From 1881 to 1894, he served on the Council of the Municipality of Waterloo and was twice Mayor of Waterloo. He was also a commissioner to the Melbourne Centennial Exhibition in 1888. In 1894, he was elected to the New South Wales Legislative Assembly as the Independent Free Trade member for Waterloo. Re-elected as a formal Free Trader in 1895, 1898, and 1901; he defected to the Progressive Party but was defeated running for Alexandria in 1904. He had married Florence Espley on 29 March 1902. Anderson died at Stanmore in 1919.

New South Wales Legislative Assembly
New district	Member for Waterloo; 1894–1904	District abolished
Civic offices
Preceded by William Briggs Cole	Mayor of Waterloo; 1886 – 1887	Succeeded by Weeks White
Preceded by Llewellyn Preston Williams	Mayor of Waterloo; 1891 – 1892	Succeeded by Thomas Lamond
