= James McGowen =

Australian politician (1855–1922)

The Honourable James McGowen
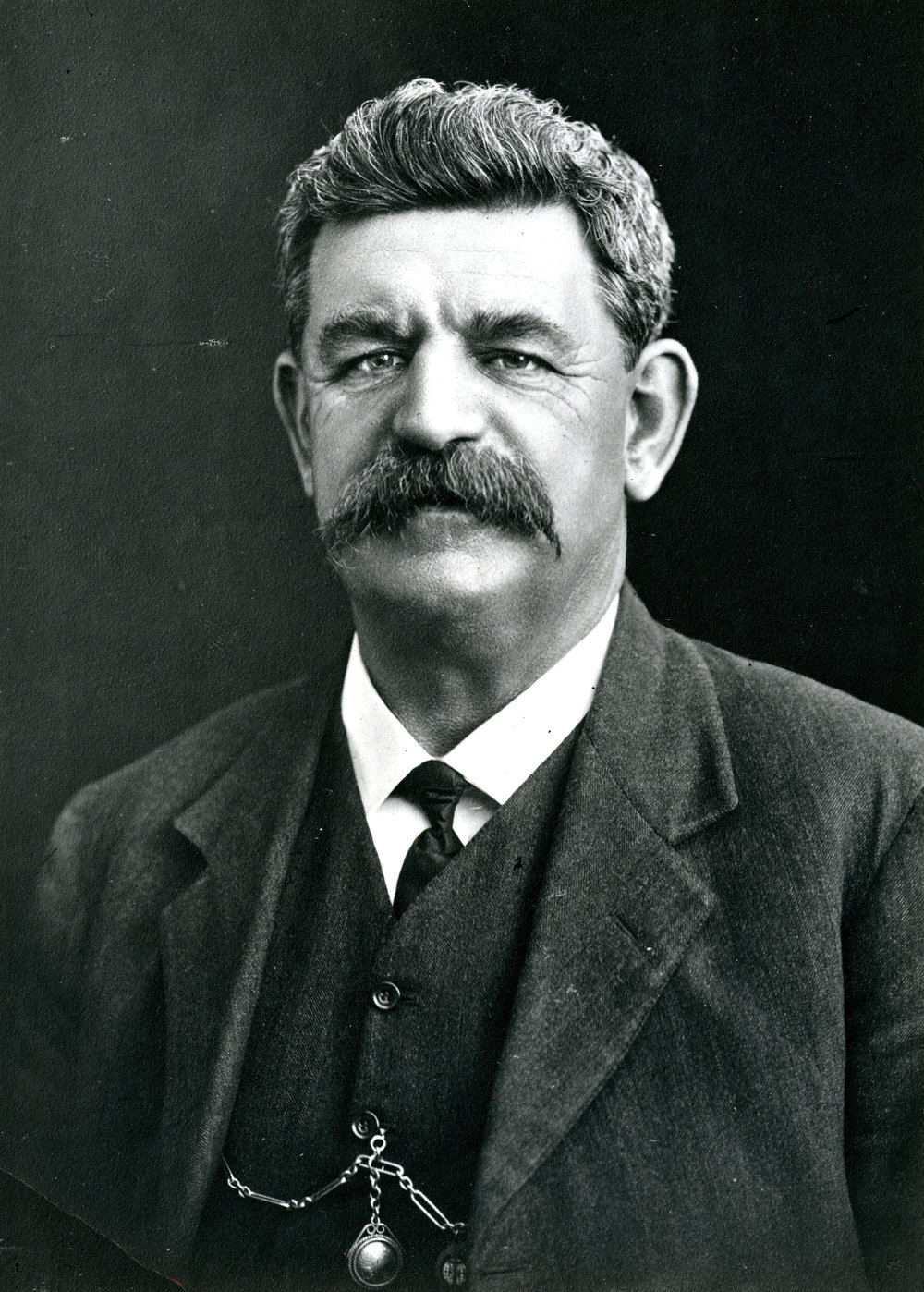
- McGowen in 1913

18th Premier of New South Wales
- In office 21 October 1910 – 29 June 1913
- Monarch: George V
- Governor: Lord Chelmsford; Sir Gerald Strickland
- Preceded by: Charles Wade
- Succeeded by: William Holman

Member of the New South Wales Legislative Assembly for Redfern
- In office 17 June 1891 – 21 February 1917
- Preceded by: William Stephen
- Succeeded by: William McKell

Member of the New South Wales Legislative Council
- In office 17 July 1917 – 7 April 1922

Personal details
- Born: James Sinclair Taylor McGowen; 16 August 1855 at sea
- Died: 7 April 1922 (aged 66) Petersham, New South Wales, Australia
- Spouse: Emily Towner (m. 1878)
- Occupation: Boilermaker

James Sinclair Taylor McGowen (16 August 1855 – 7 April 1922) was an Australian politician. He served as premier of New South Wales from 1910 to 1913, the first member of the Australian Labor Party (ALP) to hold the position, and was a key figure in the party's early history in New South Wales.

McGowen was born at sea to English immigrants. He was a boilermaker by profession and soon became involved in the labour movement, becoming president of the Sydney Trades Hall in 1888. McGowen was elected to the New South Wales Legislative Assembly at the 1891 general election under the auspices of the Labor Electoral League. He succeeded as party leader in 1894 and retained the position following Federation in 1901. He became leader of the opposition after the 1904 election and led the ALP to majority government in 1910. As premier, McGowen oversaw progressive reforms. He was succeeded by his deputy William Holman in 1913 and expelled from the ALP following the 1916 split over conscription. He finished his career as a Nationalist appointee to the New South Wales Legislative Council.

== Early life and family ==
McGowen was the son of James McGowen, a boilermaker, and his wife Eliza Ditchfield, immigrants from Lancashire and was born at sea, on the "Western Bride", on the way to Melbourne. His father worked building in bridges, initially in Victoria, and later in New South Wales. After limited schooling he was apprenticed as a boiler maker in 1870. He became a member of the United Society of Boilermakers and Iron Shipbuilders of New South Wales on its establishment in 1873, he became secretary in 1874.

McGowen married Emily Towner in 1878 in Redfern, Sydney.

== Political career ==
In 1891, the New South Wales Trades and Labour Council established the Labor Electoral League, which developed into Labor Party, and McGowen stood for election to the New South Wales Legislative Assembly seat of Redfern and was one of 35 Labor candidates to win and the most experienced unionist. He held the seat continuously to 1917.

The first Labor parliamentarians in New South Wales were almost as fractious as their fellow parliamentarians from the other parties. McGowen was one of three legislators to sign the "pledge" to abide by party discipline. Thanks to his increasing skill as a parliamentarian, his effective public speaking, and his relative seniority, he became Labor's parliamentary leader in 1894. George Reid's Free Trade Government was dependent on Labor's support. With their support, Reid reduced tariffs, introduced income tax, and eliminated the property qualification for membership of the Legislative Council. McGowan led Labor in its opposition to the Federation Bill produced by the Australasian Constitutional Convention. The party opposed the proposed Constitution on the grounds it was undemocratic. McGowen strongly favoured retaining appeals to the Privy Council from the High Court, but stressed this was his personal view. Labor reconciled itself to the Constitution once it had been approved in referendums across Australia in 1899. McGowen stood for the Federal seat of South Sydney in 1901, but was narrowly defeated.

In December 1907, McGowan and the Labor Party—whose policy preference was nationalisation of the iron and steel industry—moved a last minute amendment that, when carried, led indirectly to the collapse of William Sandford Limited, owners of the Eskbank Ironworks at Lithgow.

== Premier ==
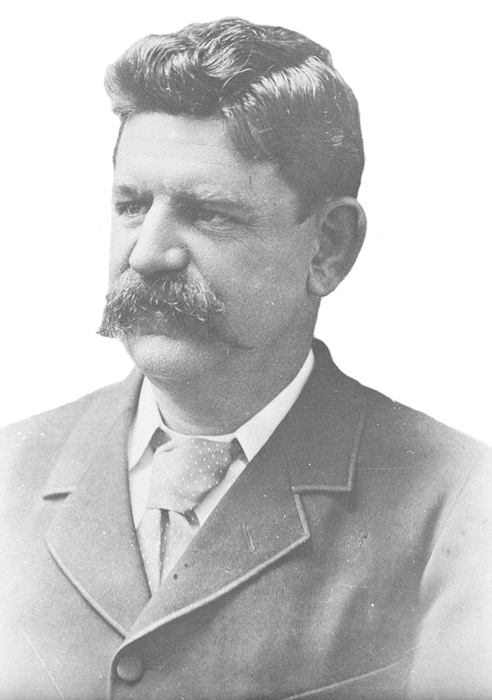
James McGowen

McGowen's honesty and judiciousness were reassuring to the public, and were major factors in Labor's 1910 election win. He remained Premier until 1913, but was not an effective director of the parliamentary party, preferring to leave most issues of party management to his deputy, William Holman. As well as being Premier, he was also Treasurer during most of 1911 and Chief Secretary from December 1911.

In 1913, while Holman was in England, McGowen attempted to settle a gas workers' strike by threatening to dismiss the strikers and to hire non-union workers in their stead. This threat antagonised most of the state ALP, and when Holman returned to Australia in June 1913, he organised McGowen's overthrow. McGowen became Minister for Labour and Industry in Holman's first cabinet, holding this post until January 1914.

The McGowen government carried out an active policy of subsidising hospitals and dispensaries in order to bring about the realisation of universal health care system. Nevertheless, opposition by doctors to state control forced the government to concentrate on financing new and existing institutions, such as nursing services for remote bush districts, while Friendly Societies were financially supported and membership encouraged. As a result, improved low-cost medical services were made widely available throughout New South Wales. In addition, public works were expanded, and important educational reforms were enacted, together with reforms in electoral law, income tax, arbitration, and housing for workers.

The Theatres and Public Halls Act 1912 implemented censorship of films deemed obscene, implementing the so-called bushranger ban.

== Later life ==
Three of McGowen's sons served in the Great War; one of them was killed at Gallipoli in 1915. McGowen remained a strong supporter of Australia's involvement in the war. The 1916 Labor conference decided to oppose conscription. McGowen, who favoured conscription, was expelled from the party along with many other ALP parliamentarians.

At the 1917 election McGowen was defeated by the official Labor candidate William McKell (himself a future Premier), but his career did not end there. His old rival Holman, now himself an apostate from the ALP and leading a Nationalist administration, appointed McGowen to the then unelected Legislative Council in July 1917.

McGowen died of heart disease in the Sydney suburb of Petersham and was survived by his wife, five of their seven sons, and two daughters. A large crowd attended his funeral at St Paul's Church, Redfern, New South Wales on 8 April 1922; he was buried at Rookwood Cemetery.

== Speeches ==
- Policy speech 1910.

New South Wales Legislative Assembly
| Preceded by William Stephen | Member for Redfern; 1891–1917; With: Schey/none, Sharp/none, Hoyle/none | Succeeded by William McKell |
Political offices
| Preceded by Joseph Carruthers | Leader of the Opposition of New South Wales; 1904–1910 | Succeeded by Charles Wade |
| Preceded by Charles Wade | Premier of New South Wales; 1910–1913 | Succeeded by William Holman |
| Preceded by Thomas Waddell | Treasurer; 1910–1911 | Succeeded by John Dacey |
| Preceded by Fred Flowers | Chief Secretary; 1911–1913 | Succeeded by William Holman |
| Preceded by Campbell Carmichael | Minister for Labour and Industry; 1913–1914 | Succeeded by John Estell |
Party political offices
| Preceded by Joseph Cook | Leader of the Australian Labor Party in New South Wales; 1894–1913 | Succeeded by William Holman |
