= Electoral district of Redfern =

Former state electoral district of New South Wales, Australia

Redfern was an electoral district of the Legislative Assembly in the Australian state of New South Wales, created in 1880, and named after and including the Sydney suburb of Redfern. It extended to Botany Bay and was bordered by Rainbow Street (Redfern), Anzac Parade, the southern edge of Moore Park, South Dowling Street, Cleveland Street, City Road, King Street, Newtown, Alexandra Canal and Cooks River. It elected two members from 1880 to 1882, three members from 1882 to 1887 and four members from 1887 until the abolition of multi-member electorates in 1894, when it was split into Redfern, Botany, Darlington, Waterloo and part of Newtown-Erskine. In 1920, with the introduction of proportional representation, it was absorbed into Botany. It was recreated in 1927 and abolished in 1968.

== Members for Redfern ==
Two members (1880–1882)
Member	Party	Term	Member	Party	Term						
Alfred Fremlin	None	1880–1882	John Sutherland	None	1880–1882						
Alfred Fremlin	None	1880–1882	Francis Wright	None	1882						
Three members (1882–1887)
Member	Party	Term	Member	Party	Term	Member	Party	Term			
Alfred Fremlin	None	1882–1885	Francis Wright	None	1882–1885	John Sutherland	None	1882–1887			
Arthur Renwick	None	1885–1887	Thomas Williamson	None	1885–1887	John Sutherland	None	1882–1887			
Four members (1887–1894)
Member	Party	Term	Member	Party	Term	Member	Party	Term	Member	Party	Term
William Stephen	Free Trade	1887–1891	William Schey	Free Trade	1887–1889	John Sutherland	Free Trade	1887–1889	James Farnell	Free Trade	1887–1888
William Stephen	Free Trade	1887–1891	William Schey	Free Trade	1887–1889	John Sutherland	Free Trade	1887–1889	Peter Howe	Protectionist	1888–1891
William Stephen	Free Trade	1887–1891	Charles Goodchap	Protectionist	1889–1891	John Sutherland	Free Trade	1887–1889	Peter Howe	Protectionist	1888–1891
William Stephen	Free Trade	1887–1891	Charles Goodchap	Protectionist	1889–1891	William Schey	Protectionist	1889–1894	Peter Howe	Protectionist	1888–1891
James McGowen	Labour	1891–1894	Henry Hoyle	Protectionist	1891–1894	William Schey	Protectionist	1889–1894	William Sharp	Labour	1891–1894
Single-member (1894–1920)
Member	Party	Term									
James McGowen	Labour	1894–1917									
William McKell	Labor	1917–1920									
Single-member (1927–1968)
Member	Party	Term									
William McKell	Labor	1927–1947									
George Noble	Labor	1947–1949									
Kevin Dwyer	Labor	1949–1950									
Fred Green	Labor	1950–1968									

== Election results ==
1965 New South Wales state election: Redfern
Party	Candidate	Votes	%	±%
Labor	Fred Green	14,453	72.4	−9.4
Liberal	Gerald Bayliss	4,811	24.1	+10.7
Communist	Cecil Sharrock	703	3.5	−1.4
Total formal votes		19,967	96.6	−1.2
Informal votes		692	3.4	+1.2
Turnout		20,659	91.1	+0.1
Two-party-preferred result
Labor	Fred Green	15,015	75.2	−10.5
Liberal	Gerald Bayliss	4,952	24.8	+10.5
Labor hold		Swing	−10.5	
