= Royal hospital =

Medical institution founded by a monarch

A royal hospital is a hospital or charitable medical institution founded, endowed, chartered, or formally patronized by a monarch or royal household. Historically, many royal hospitals were established to care for soldiers, sailors, the poor, elderly people, or other groups considered deserving of state or charitable support. The term may indicate a historical association with the Crown rather than direct royal administration.

Several hospitals and former hospitals are known formally or informally as Royal Hospital.

== Australia ==
=== Melbourne ===
- Royal Children's Hospital, a paediatric hospital in Melbourne, Victoria, founded in 1870, moving to Flemington Road in 1963
- Royal Dental Hospital of Melbourne, a dental hospital in Melbourne, Victoria, founded in 1890, gaining royal patronage in 1969, and moving to Swanston Street in 2003
- Royal Melbourne Hospital, a general hospital in Melbourne, Victoria, founded in 1848, gaining royal patronage in 1935, moving to Parkville in 1944
- Royal Park Hospital, a psychiatric hospital in Melbourne, Victoria, founded in 1907 and closed in 1999
- Royal Women's Hospital, a specialist women's hospital in Melbourne, Victoria, founded in 1856, gaining royal patronage in 1954, and relocating to Parkville in 2008
- Royal Victorian Eye and Ear Hospital, a specialist public teaching hospital founded in 1863

=== Sydney ===
- Royal Alexandra Hospital for Children, a paediatric teaching hospital in Sydney, New South Wales, founded in 1880, moving to Westmead in 1995
- Royal Hospital for Women, a hospital for women and babies in Sydney, New South Wales, founded in 1820, and granted royal patronage by King Edward VII in 1904
- Royal North Shore Hospital, a teaching hospital in Sydney, New South Wales, founded in 1885, moving to St Leonards in 1905
- Royal Prince Alfred Hospital, a teaching hospital in Sydney, New South Wales, founded in 1882, named after Prince Alfred, Duke of Edinburgh
- Royal South Sydney Hospital, a general hospital in Sydney, New South Wales, founded in 1913, gaining royal patronage in 1917, and closing in 2003

=== Tasmania ===
- Royal Derwent Hospital, an asylum for the insane and handicapped in Derwent, Tasmania, founded in 1827, gaining royal patronage in 1967, and closing in 2000
- Royal Hobart Hospital, a teaching hospital in Hobart, Tasmania, founded in 1804

=== Other ===
- Royal Adelaide Hospital, a teaching hospital in Adelaide, South Australia, founded in 1840, moved to a new state of the art facility in 2017.
- Royal Brisbane and Women's Hospital, a teaching hospital in Brisbane, Queensland
- Royal Canberra Hospital, a hospital in Canberra, opened in 1914, closed in 1991 and demolished in 1997
- Royal Darwin Hospital, a teaching hospital in Darwin, Northern Territory, founded in 1874, gaining royal patronage in 1984
- Royal Newcastle Hospital, a former general hospital in Newcastle, New South Wales, founded in 1817 and closed in 2007
- Royal Perth Hospital, a teaching hospital in Perth, Western Australia, founded in 1830, and given royal patronage in 1946

== Canada ==
- Royal Alexandra Hospital, Edmonton, a general hospital in Edmonton, Alberta, founded in 1899
- Royal Columbian Hospital, a tertiary hospital in New Westminster, British Columbia, founded in 1862
- Royal Jubilee Hospital, a general hospital in Victoria, British Columbia, founded in 1890 and named in honour of the Golden Jubilee of Queen Victoria in 1887
- Royal University Hospital, a teaching hospital in Saskatoon, Saskatchewan, part of the University of Saskatchewan, founded in 1955 and given royal patronage by Queen Elizabeth II in 1990
- Royal Victoria Regional Health Centre, a general hospital in Barrie, Ontario, founded in 1891
- Royal Victoria Hospital, Montreal, a teaching hospital in Montreal, Quebec, founded in 1893

== United Kingdom ==
=== England ===
==== Midlands ====
- Chesterfield Royal Hospital, a general hospital with A&E in Chesterfield, Derbyshire
- Devonshire Royal Hospital, a former a hospital for the poor founded in 1859 in Buxton, Derbyshire. It was built in 1780 as a stable block, and refurbished in 2003 for use as a campus building of the University of Derby
- Leicester Royal Infirmary
- Princess Royal Hospital, Telford, a general hospital in Telford, Shropshire
- Royal Derby Hospital, a teaching hospital in Derby
- Royal Orthopaedic Hospital, a specialist orthopaedic hospital in Birmingham, founded in 1909
- Royal Shrewsbury Hospital, a teaching hospital in Shrewsbury, Shropshire, founded in 1979
- Royal Hospital, Wolverhampton, an acute general hospital, founded in 1846

==== Northern England ====
- Royal Bolton Hospital, a general hospital in Farnworth, Greater Manchester
- Royal Hallamshire Hospital, a teaching hospital in Sheffield, founded in 1979
- Royal Liverpool University Hospital, a teaching hospital in Liverpool, part of the University of Liverpool, founded in 1978
- Royal Oldham Hospital, a general hospital in Oldham, Greater Manchester, founded in 1870 as a workhouse, gaining royal patronage when rebuilt in 1989
- Sheffield Royal Hospital, a former hospital in Sheffield, opened in 1832 as a dispensary, converted to a hospital in 1857, and closed and demolished in 1978
- Bradford Royal Infirmary
- Royal Lancaster Infirmary
- Royal Preston Hospital
- Salford Royal Hospital, a teaching hospital based in the Hope area of Pendleton, (M6), Salford
- Royal Blackburn Teaching Hospital, an acute District General Hospital in Blackburn with Darwen, Lancashire

===== Manchester =====
- Cheadle Royal Hospital, a psychiatric hospital in the Cheadle Royal area of Cheadle, Greater Manchester, founded in 1848 as the Manchester Royal Lunatic Asylum
- Manchester Royal Eye Hospital, an ophthalmic hospital in Manchester, founded in 1814, and moved to the Manchester Royal Infirmary site in 1886
- Royal Manchester Children's Hospital, a former paediatric hospital in Pendlebury, near Manchester, founded in 1829, granted royal patronage in 1923, and closed in 2009

==== South West ====
- Bristol Royal Hospital for Children, a paediatric hospital in Bristol, founded in 2001
- Gloucestershire Royal Hospital, a general hospital in Gloucester, founded in 1914
- Royal Bournemouth Hospital, an acute general hospital in Bournemouth, Dorset, founded in 1992
- Royal Cornwall Hospital, a teaching hospital in Treliske, Truro, Cornwall
- Royal Devon and Exeter Hospital, a teaching hospital in Exeter, Devon
- Royal National Hospital for Rheumatic Diseases, a specialist rheumatology hospital in Bath, Somerset, founded in 1742
- Royal United Hospital, an acute hospital in Bath, Somerset, founded in 1826, given royal patronage by Queen Victoria in 1864, and moving to Combe Park in 1932

==== South East ====
===== Hampshire =====
- Royal Hampshire County Hospital, a general hospital in Winchester, Hampshire, founded in 1736, and rebuilt with royal patronage from Queen Victoria in 1868
- Royal Hospital Haslar, a former military hospital in Gosport, Hampshire, founded in 1753 and closed in 2009
- Royal Portsmouth Hospital, a former hospital in Portsmouth, Hampshire, closed in 1978
- Royal South Hants Hospital, an acute hospital in Southampton, Hampshire, founded in 1835

===== London =====
- Bethlem Royal Hospital, a psychiatric hospital in Beckenham, Bromley, founded in 1330
- Greenwich Hospital, London, formerly the Royal Hospital for Seamen at Greenwich
- Princess Royal University Hospital, a general hospital in Farnborough, Bromley, founded in 2003
- Royal Brompton Hospital, a specialist hospital in Brompton, Kensington, founded in 1847
- Royal Free Hospital, a teaching hospital in Hampstead, founded in 1828, given royal patronage by Queen Victoria in 1837, and moving to Pond Street in the 1970s
- Royal Hospital Chelsea, a retirement home and nursing home for British soldiers, the 'Chelsea Pensioners', founded by King Charles II in 1681
  - Royal Hospital (ward), electoral ward in Chelsea, London
- Royal Hospital for Neuro-disability, an independent specialist charitable hospital in Putney, Wandsworth, founded in 1854 and receiving royal patronage in 1919
- Royal London Hospital, a teaching hospital in Whitechapel, Tower Hamlets, founded in 1740, moving to Whitechapel in 1757
- Royal London Hospital for Integrated Medicine, an NHS teaching and complementary medicine hospital in Bloomsbury, Camden, founded in 1849, moving to Great Ormond street in 1859, gaining royal patronage from George VI
- Royal National Throat, Nose and Ear Hospital, a specialist otolaryngology hospital in Gray's Inn Road, Camden, founded in the 1870s
- Royal National Orthopaedic Hospital, a specialist orthopaedic hospital in Stanmore, Harrow, and central London, founded in 1909
- Royal Northern Hospital, a former general hospital in Holloway Road, founded in 1888, receiving royal patronage in 1921, and being closed and demolished in the mid-1990s

===== Surrey =====
- Royal Earlswood Hospital, a former asylum for the mentally ill in Redhill, Surrey, built in 1853, and given royal patronage by Queen Victoria in 1862, closed in 1997 and redeveloped as housing as Royal Earlswood Park
- Royal Surrey County Hospital, a general hospital in Guildford, Surrey

===== Sussex =====
- Princess Royal Hospital, Haywards Heath, a general hospital in Haywards Heath, West Sussex, founded as an asylum in 1859 and renamed the Princess Royal in the 1980s
- Royal Alexandra Children's Hospital, a paediatric hospital in Brighton, East Sussex, founded in 1868, moving to Dyke Road in 1881, moving into new premises in the grounds of Royal Sussex County Hospital in 2007
- Royal Sussex County Hospital, an acute teaching hospital in Brighton East Sussex, founded in 1828, gaining royal patronage in 1911

===== Other =====
- Royal Berkshire Hospital, an acute hospital in Reading, Berkshire, founded in 1839, sponsored by King William IV
- Royal Buckinghamshire Hospital, a private specialist hospital in Aylesbury, Buckinghamshire, founded in 1832, gaining royal patronage after treating a young Edward VII

==== East of England ====
===== Cambridgeshire =====
- Royal Papworth Hospital, a specialist heart and lung hospital, located on the Cambridge Biomedical Campus in Cambridge, England, originally founded in Papworth Everard, Huntingdonshire in 1918, granted the designation "Royal" by Queen Elizabeth II in 2017, and reopened by the Queen in 2019 in Cambridge.

=== Northern Ireland ===
- Royal Belfast Hospital for Sick Children, a paediatric hospital in Belfast
- Royal Victoria Hospital, Belfast, a general hospital in Belfast, founded in 1873

=== Scotland ===
==== Aberdeen ====
- Royal Aberdeen Children's Hospital, a paediatric hospital in Aberdeen, founded in 1929, rebuilt in 2004
- Royal Cornhill Hospital, a psychiatric hospital in Aberdeen, founded in 1880

==== Glasgow ====
- Gartnavel Royal Hospital, a mental health centre in Glasgow, founded in 1843
- Royal Alexandra Hospital, Paisley, a general hospital in Paisley, Glasgow, founded in 1986, opened by Princess Alexandra
- Royal Hospital for Children, Glasgow, a paediatric hospital in Glasgow, founded in 1882, given royal patronage in 1889

==== Edinburgh ====
- Royal Edinburgh Hospital, a psychiatric hospital in Edinburgh, founded in the early 19th century
- Royal Hospital for Sick Children, Edinburgh, a paediatric hospital in Edinburgh, founded in 1860, and given royal patronage in 1863
- Royal Victoria Hospital, Edinburgh, a geriatric/rehabilitation hospital in Edinburgh

==== Other ====
- Inverclyde Royal Hospital, a general hospital in Greenock opened in 1979
- Sunnyside Royal Hospital, psychiatric hospital in Hillside, Angus, founded in 1781
- Forth Valley Royal Hospital, a general hospital in Larbert opened in 2011 to replace both Stirling Royal Infirmary and Falkirk Royal Infirmary; after the conclusion of the transfer of patients and services to the new hospital the old sites were redeveloped and new community hospitals were opened on both the previous sites

=== Wales ===
- Royal Glamorgan Hospital, a general hospital in Talbot Green founded in 2000
- Royal Gwent Hospital, a general hospital in Newport founded as the Newport Dispensary in 1836, moving to Cardiff Road in 1901 and gaining royal patronage with its current title in 1913

== Republic of Ireland ==
=== Dublin ===
- Royal City of Dublin Hospital, a hospital in Dublin founded in 1832, and gaining royal patronage in 1900
- Royal Hospital, Donnybrook, a former hospital in Dublin, founded in 1743 as a hospital for incurables, then for venereal disease sufferers from 1792, and closed and demolished in 1949
- Royal Hospital Kilmainham in Dublin, a 1684 built retirement home for soldiers, restored in 1984 as the Irish Museum of Modern Art (IMMA)
- Royal Victoria Eye and Ear Hospital, a specialist ophthalmology and otolaryngology teaching hospital in Dublin, founded in 1897

== See also ==
- Royal Alexandra Hospital (disambiguation)
- Royal Hospital for Sick Children (disambiguation)
- Royal Hospital School, a British co-educational independent day and boarding school with naval traditions
- Royal Infirmary, a list of hospitals in the U.K.
- Royal Naval Hospital (disambiguation)
- Royal Victoria Hospital (disambiguation)
- The Royal, a British television series set in the fictional St Aidan's Royal Free Hospital in Yorkshire
