= Royal Alexandra =

Royal Alexandra may refer to:

- Royal Alexandra Theatre, Toronto, Ontario
- Royal Alexandra Hospital, the name of various facilities in the United Kingdom and Canada
- Alexandra Bridge, (officially the "Royal Alexandra Interprovincial Bridge"), between Ottawa, Ontario, and Gatineau, Quebec
- Royal Yacht Alexandra
