= Kleenmaid =

Australian domestic appliance brand

- Type: Private
- Industry: Home appliance
- Founded: 1984 Sunshine Coast, Queensland, Australia
- Headquarters: Alexandria, New South Wales, Australia
- Owner: Compass Capital Partners
- Number of employees: 1001-5000 (2022)
- Website: kleenmaid.com.au

Kleenmaid is an Australian owned domestic appliance brand that was originally established in 1984. In 2009 it was acquired by the private equity group Compass Capital Partners who relaunched it to the public in 2012 with a newly developed Black Krystal range of appliances and a new logo.

Kleenmaid today is based in Alexandria, Sydney and sells its products via a network of kitchen manufacturers and independent electrical retailers.

== History ==
Kleenmaid was established on the Sunshine Coast, Queensland in 1984. Its first product was an American manufactured washing machine sold through appliance service agents. These agents recommended the Kleenmaid product whilst attending to service calls on other brands of washing machines in the consumer's home. Kleenmaid later expanded into other products including cooking appliances, refrigerators and vacuum cleaners sourced from a variety of foreign appliance suppliers and sold through major appliance retailers including Harvey Norman & Clive Peeters. After several years of operation in major retailers Kleenmaid severed all ties with these partners and commenced selling through its own network of corporate owned and franchised stores. By 2009 the company had 20 retail outlets operating across five states. Five of these outlets were wholly owned by the company with the remaining 15 held by franchisees. In 2008 the company was reported to have over 400 employees, and was listed in Business Review Weekly's listing of the top 500 Australian companies.

== Company collapse ==
In 2008 rumours started to circulate about the financial stability of the company. On 9 April 2009 Kleenmaid announced the company would be going into voluntary administration with debts of a reported $67 million. 150 employees were to lose their jobs immediately as a consequence.

On 17 May 2009 the administrators from Deloitte Touche Tohmatsu released their report which revised the debt to $82 million and indicated the company may have been trading while insolvent since June 2007.

On 25 May 2009 creditors voted to liquidate the Kleenmaid Group and Deloitte was appointed as the liquidator. The debt figure was revised to "in excess of $100 million". Remaining stocks of Kleenmaid appliances were sold at auctions for significantly cheaper prices in exchange for loss of warranties following the liquidation of the company. On 6 July 2009, authorisation was given to 'Aussie Whitegoods Rescue' to handle appliance repairs for Kleenmaid customers nationwide.

In 2015 a former director of the original Kleenmaid business, Gary Collyer Armstrong pleaded guilty and was sentenced to seven years jail for fraud and insolvent trading and in 2016 Bradley Wendell Young, another former director of the original Kleenmaid business was convicted of fraud by dishonesty and criminal insolvent trading and sentenced to nine years jail.

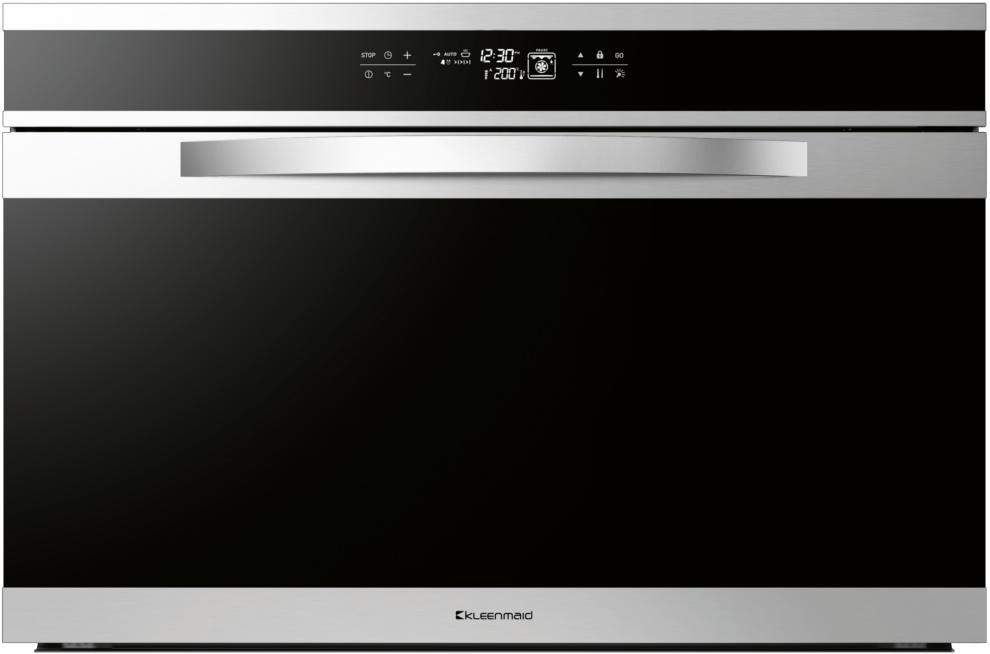
Kleenmaid Black Krystal 90cm oven

== Brand relaunch ==
In December 2009 it was announced that Compass Capital Partners had successfully acquired the Kleenmaid brand name. This was accomplished after Compass secured the existing fixed and floating charge over the assets of Orchard KM pty ltd - a Kleenmaid subsidiary. These assets included Kleenmaid's intellectual property such as the trademark, logo and brand name.

Upon acquiring the brand, Compass developed the 'Black Krystal' range of Kleenmaid ovens, as well as other new appliances, the new range was shown to the public on 22 February 2012 at the Kleenmaid Experience Centre in Alexandria, NSW. The Kleenmaid website was relaunched in 2014. During the same period, Kleenmaid re-established most connections to other companies who previously manufactured select appliances, this included Speed Queen who manufactures Kleenmaid's laundry products.

In August 2019, Kleenmaid revised its range of laundry appliances, cooktops, rangehoods, and introduced a line of beverage refrigeration units.
