= Rosebery, New South Wales =

Rosebery
- Suburb
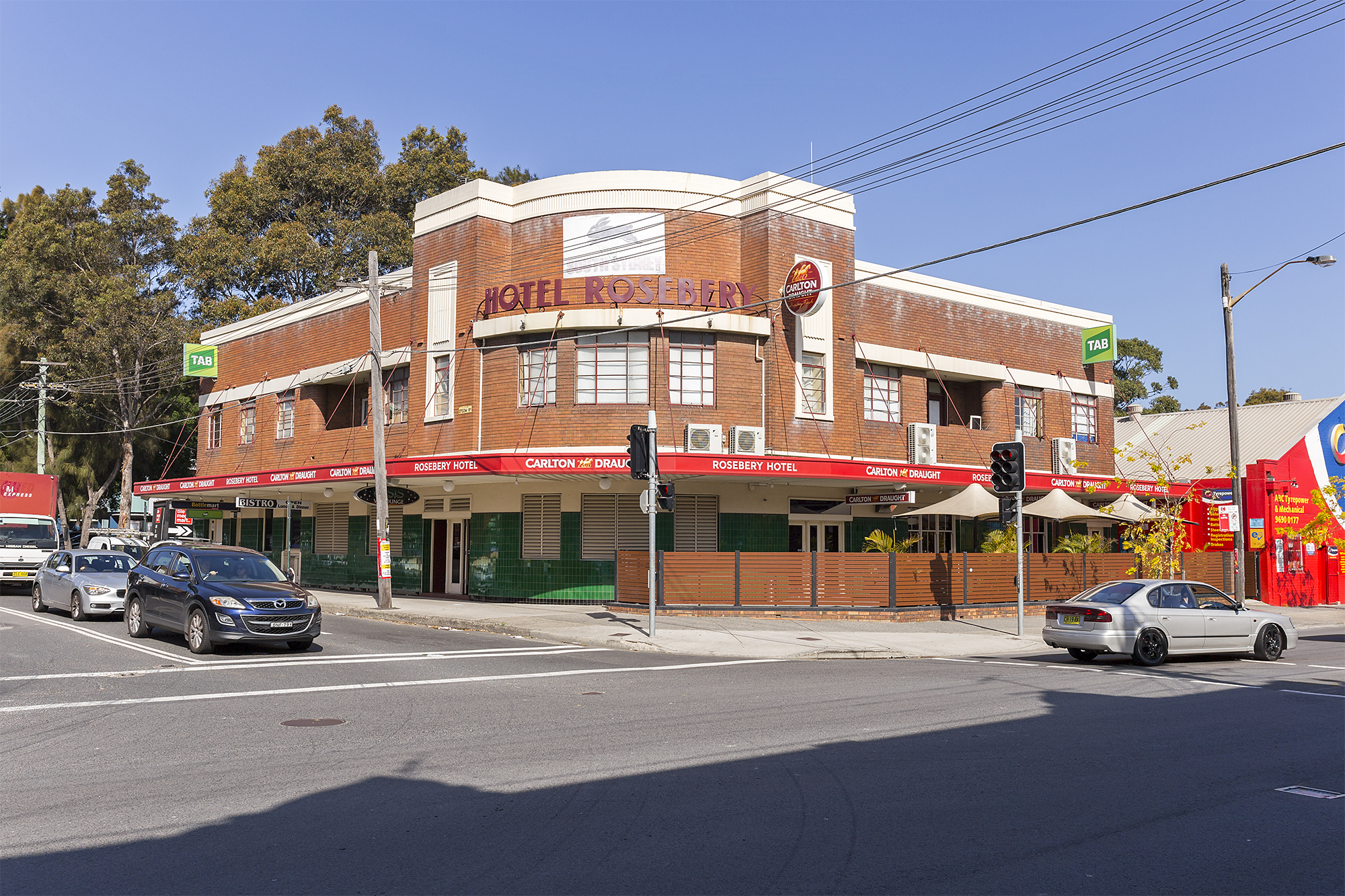
- Rosebery Hotel

- Interactive map of Rosebery
- Country: Australia
- State: New South Wales
- City: Sydney
- LGAs: City of Sydney; Bayside Council
- Location: 6 km (3.7 mi) south of Sydney CBD
- Established: 1894

Government
  - State electorate: Heffron
  - Federal divisions: Kingsford Smith; Sydney

Area
  - Total: 1.93 km^{2} (0.75 sq mi)
- Elevation: 26 m (85 ft)

Population
  - Total: 13,533 (SAL 2021)
  - Density: 7,012/km^{2} (18,160/sq mi)
- Postcode: 2018
Suburbs around Rosebery
Beaconsfield	Green Square	Kensington
Alexandria	Rosebery	Kingsford
Mascot	Mascot	Eastlakes

Rosebery is an inner southern suburb of Sydney, in the state of New South Wales, Australia. It is 6 kilometres south of the Sydney central business district and is part of the local government areas of the City of Sydney and the Bayside Council.

== History ==
Rosebery was named after Archibald Primrose, 5th Earl of Rosebery, Prime Minister of the United Kingdom in 1894–95. The suburb was named in his honour after his visit to Australia for two months in 1883–84.

Rosebery was once the site of Rosebery Racecourse, which first opened as a pony track in 1906. Race meetings held by the Associated Racing Clubs became as popular as those at Randwick, especially in the 1920s. The track became an army camp during World War II. After the war, it became a training track used by the Sydney Turf Club.

In 1961, much of the land was purchased by the Rosebery Town Planning Company and developed as an industrial area. The housing commission purchased the remaining acres for high density public housing. The area north of Gardeners Road was developed by Richard Stanton (1862–1943) and the same company that developed Haberfield, with the result that Rosebery is known as a 'garden suburb'. Garden competitions were held in the suburb prior to the 1990s. Houses are predominantly single-storey California bungalows, Federation Bungalows or "standard" suburban detached homes.

=== Trams ===
The Rosebery tram line opened in 1902 and initially ran via Chalmers and Redfern Streets and south along Elizabeth Street to Zetland. In 1924, the line was extended to Epsom Road in Rosebery. In 1948, to facilitate construction of the Eastern Suburbs Railway, a new line was constructed down Elizabeth Street between Devonshire Street and Redfern Street and the route was deviated to run down this new section. The line was electrified double track throughout. The line was closed in 1957.

== Demographics ==
At the 2021 census, the population of Rosebery was 13,533. The most common ancestries in Rosebery were Chinese 19.8%, English 17.4%, Australian 14.4%, Irish 9.7% and Greek 8.2%. 43.8% of people were born in Australia. The next most common countries of birth were China 10.8%, England 3.7%, Greece 2.7%, Ireland 2.6% and Indonesia 2.3%. 49.9% of people spoke English only at home. Other languages spoken at home included Mandarin 11.4%, Greek 6.1%, Cantonese 3.2%, Spanish 2.8% and Indonesian 2.2%. The most common responses for religion were No Religion 38.6%, Catholic 23.0% and Eastern Orthodox 9.6%.

In the 2016 census, there were 10,117 people in Rosebery.

== Commercial area ==
A small shopping centre is located on Gardeners Road. Commercial and industrial developments are also located on and around Botany Road.

== Schools ==
Gardeners Road Primary School is the public school for the area and is located at the junction of Gardeners Road and Botany Road. On Rosebery Avenue is the Sydney International Film School. St Joseph's Catholic primary school is on Rosebery Ave.

== Parks ==
There is a large park in the middle of Rosebery called Turruwul Park, which is bounded by Harcourt Parade and Hayes Road. A smaller park is Crete Reserve, situated at the southern end of Rosebery Avenue. Other small parks are located at Lever Street, where there is a scout hall, and at the corner of Harris and Coward Streets. There is also a park in Kimberley Grove. However, the nighttime lighting of Turruwul Park results in a more active night sport scene. Turruwul Park is the home of the Redfern Raiders Soccer Club.

== Gallery ==
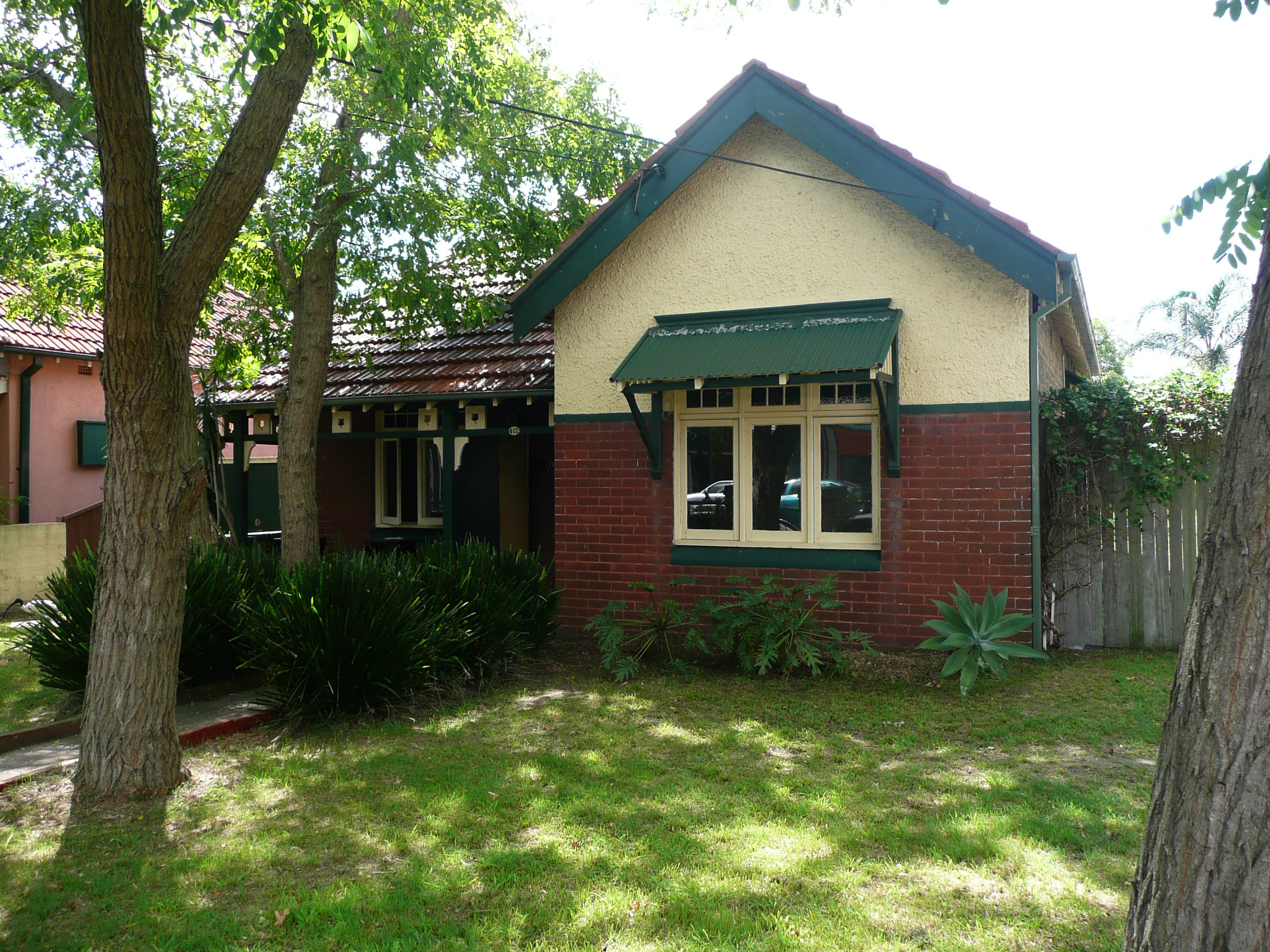
Characteristic Federation Bungalow, Gardeners Road

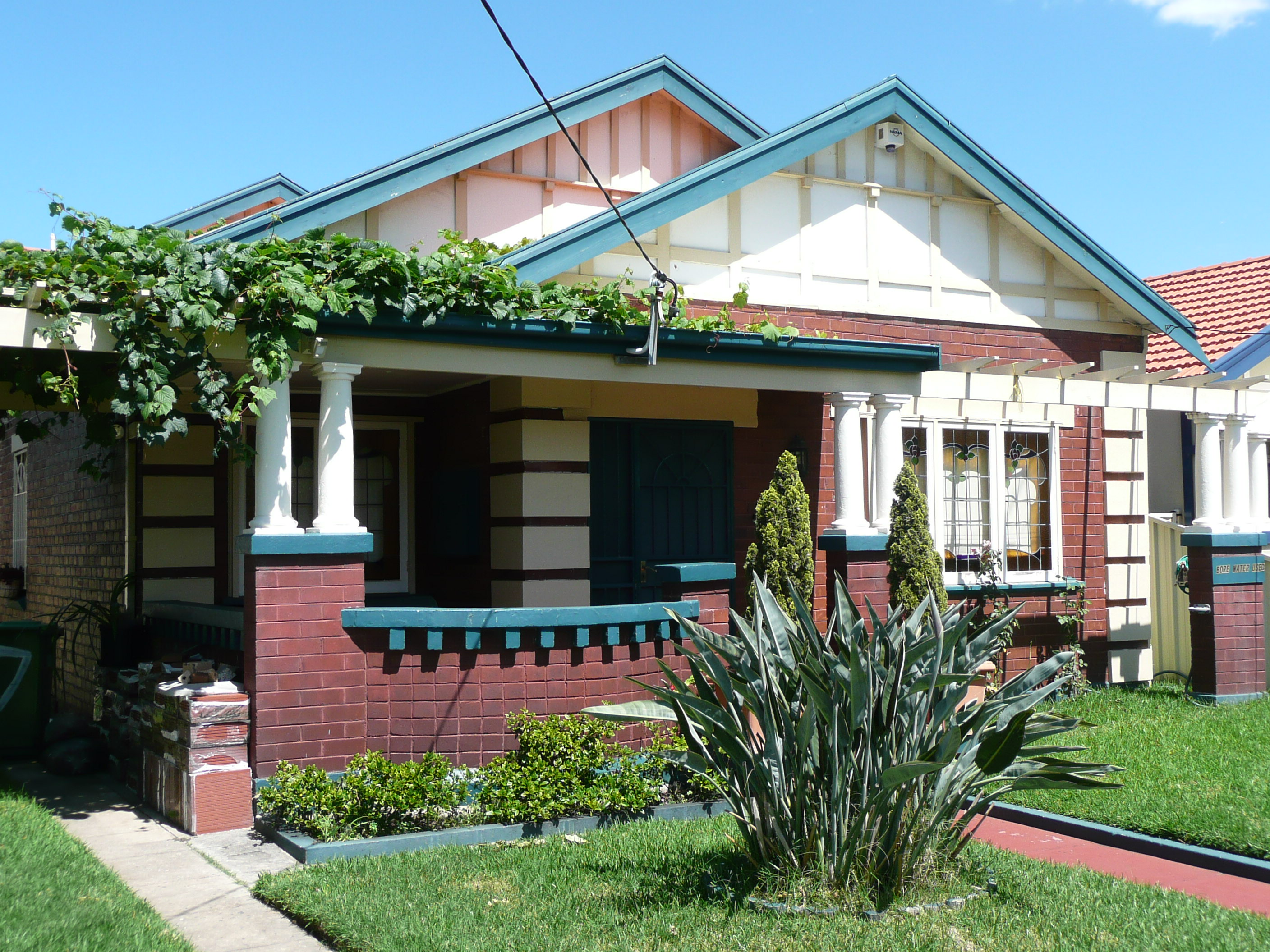
California bungalow, Tweedmouth Avenue

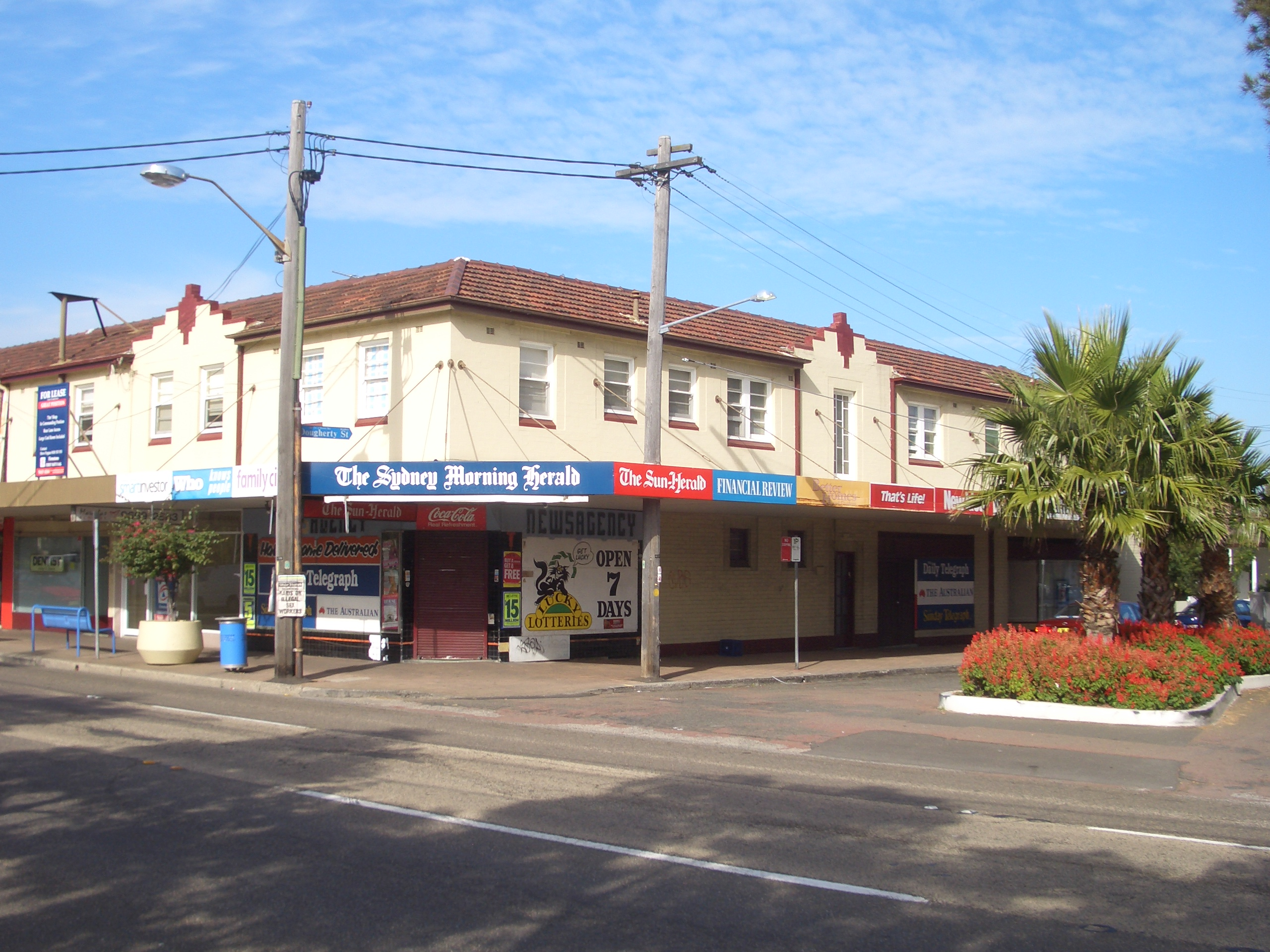
Shopping strip, Gardeners Road
