= Green Square, New South Wales =

Green Square
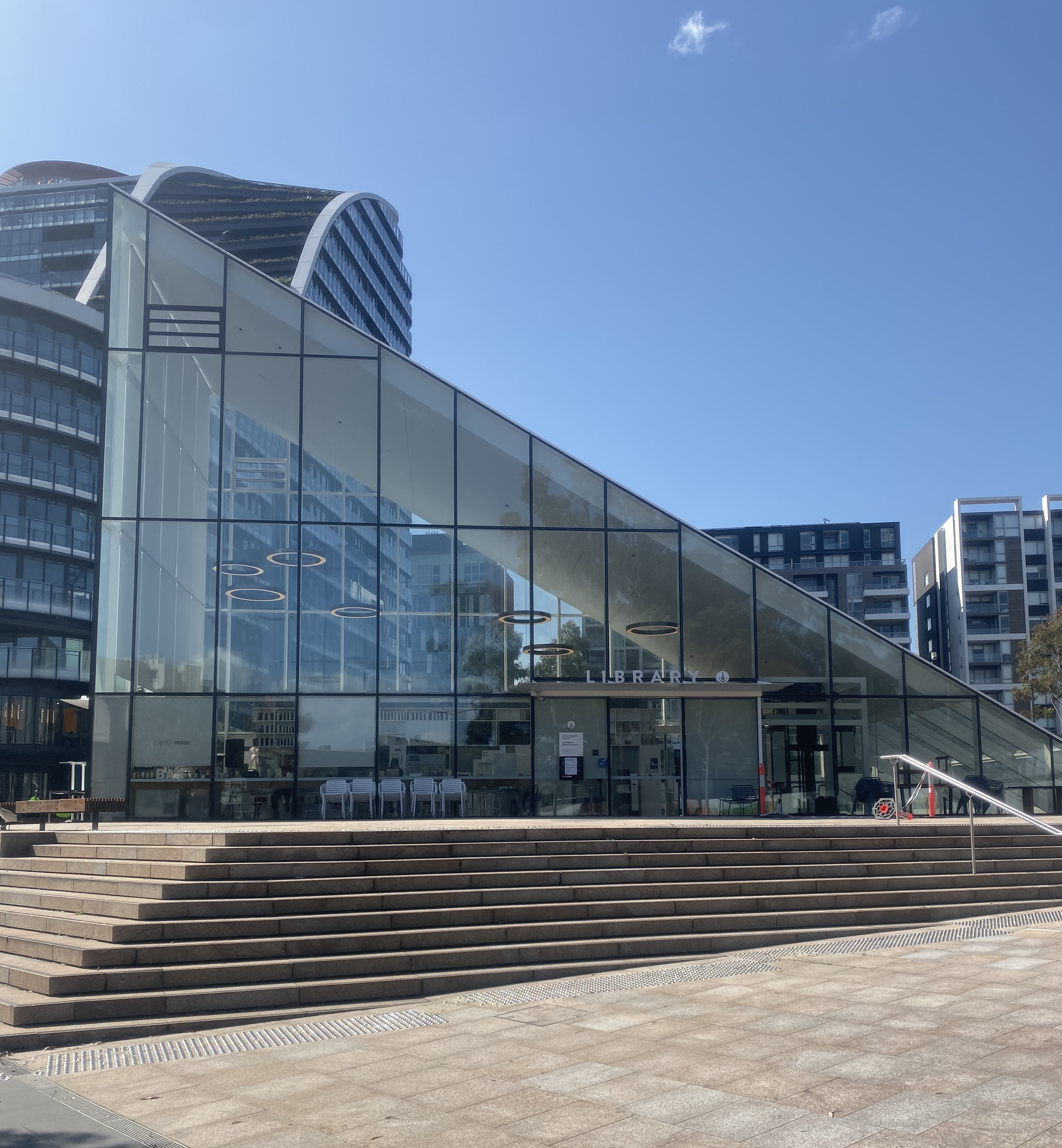
- Green Square Town Centre

- Interactive map of Green Square
- Coordinates: 33°54′22″S 151°12′11″E
- Country: Australia
- State: New South Wales
- City: Sydney
- LGA: City of Sydney
- Location: 3.5 km (2.2 mi) south of Sydney CBD

Government
  - State electorate: Heffron
  - Federal division: Sydney

Area
  - Total: 2.78 km^{2} (1.07 sq mi)

Population
  - Total: 34,253 (2021 census)
  - Density: 12,321/km^{2} (31,910/sq mi)
- Time zone: UTC+10 (AEST)
  - Summer (DST): UTC+11 (AEDT)
- Postcode: 2017 (Under review by the Geographical Names Board of NSW)
Localities around Green Square
Alexandria	Waterloo	Zetland
Alexandria	Green Square	Kensington
Alexandria	Beaconsfield	Rosebery

Green Square is an inner-southern locality of Sydney, New South Wales, Australia. The locale is at a five-way intersection where the four suburbs of Alexandria, Zetland, Waterloo and Beaconsfield meet. The precincts are linked by Ebsworth Street, Sydney's first new high street in a century, and Zetland Avenue west, a new tree-lined boulevard inspired by avenues in Manhattan with a long row of aligned traffic lights.

The Green Square Town Centre is undergoing one of the largest urban renewal projects undertaken in Australia. The urban renewal project, spanning 278 hectares, has received criticism for projections that its population will peak at around 60,000 residents and 21,000 workers by 2030.

However, this level of population density would not rank in the top 200 densely populated districts in the world. At 21,500 residents per square kilometre in the year 2030, Green Square's population density would be approximately one-third of Yorkville on the Upper East Side of Manhattan at over 60,000 residents per square kilometre, one-half of the Roquette district in Paris at over 40,000 residents per square kilometre, and in line with Tribeca or Midtown Manhattan at approximately 20,000 residents per square kilometre.

== Precincts ==
Green Square Town Centre has been awarded a 6 Star Green Star from Green building in Australia (GBCA), because it reached a high standard of governance, liveability, economic prosperity, environment and innovation.

=== Zetland Avenue west ===
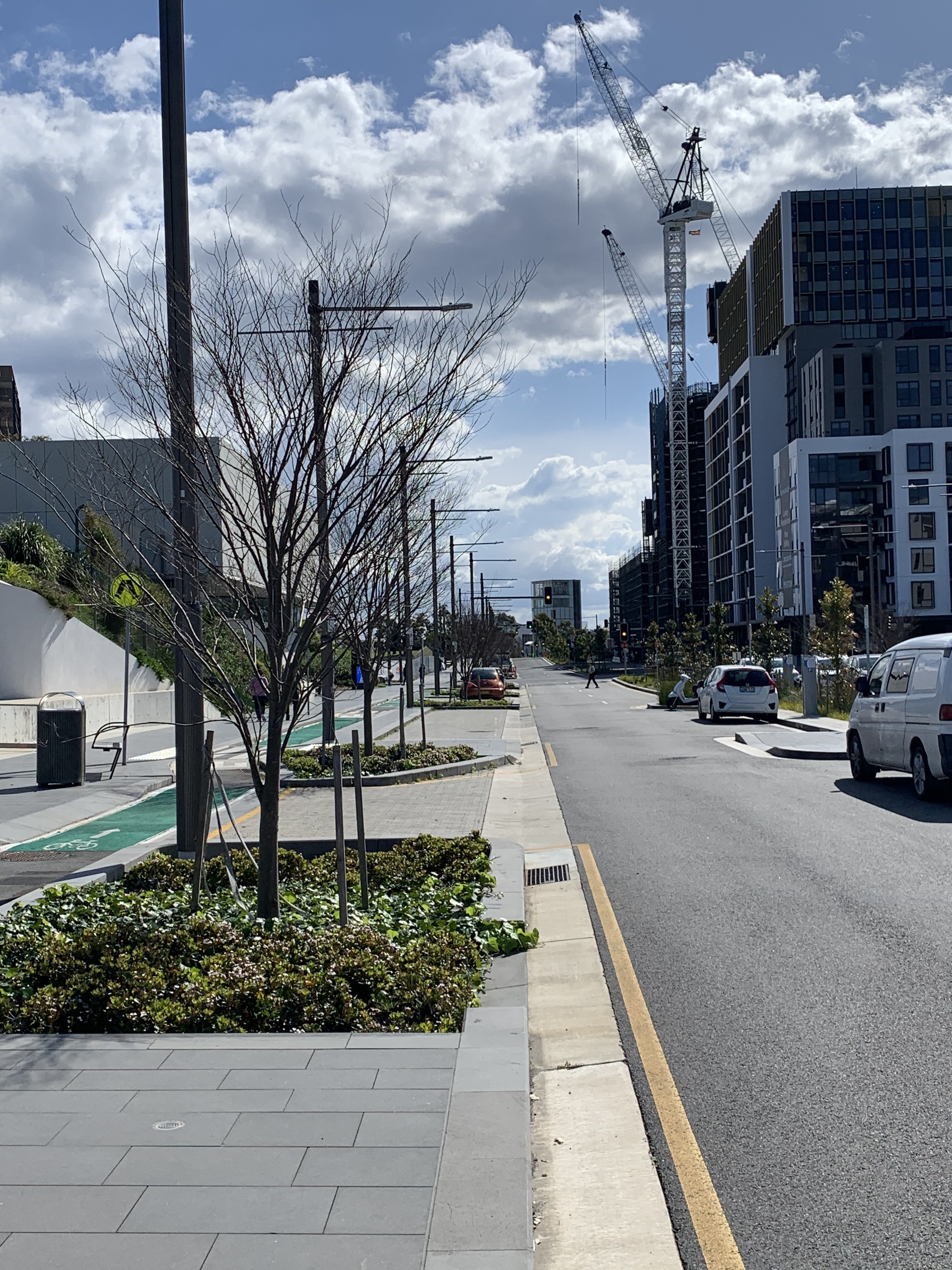
Zetland Avenue west

Zetland Avenue west is a new tree-lined boulevard inspired by avenues in Manhattan with a long row of aligned traffic lights.

The magnitude of the gentrification is unprecedented and is most pronounced in Zetland Avenue west with apartment prices far exceeding prior records set in the area, with apartments selling for as much as $4,675,000 in 2021. In part, this premium is due to the unique angle and elevation of the street with panoramic views of the city.

=== Ebsworth Street ===
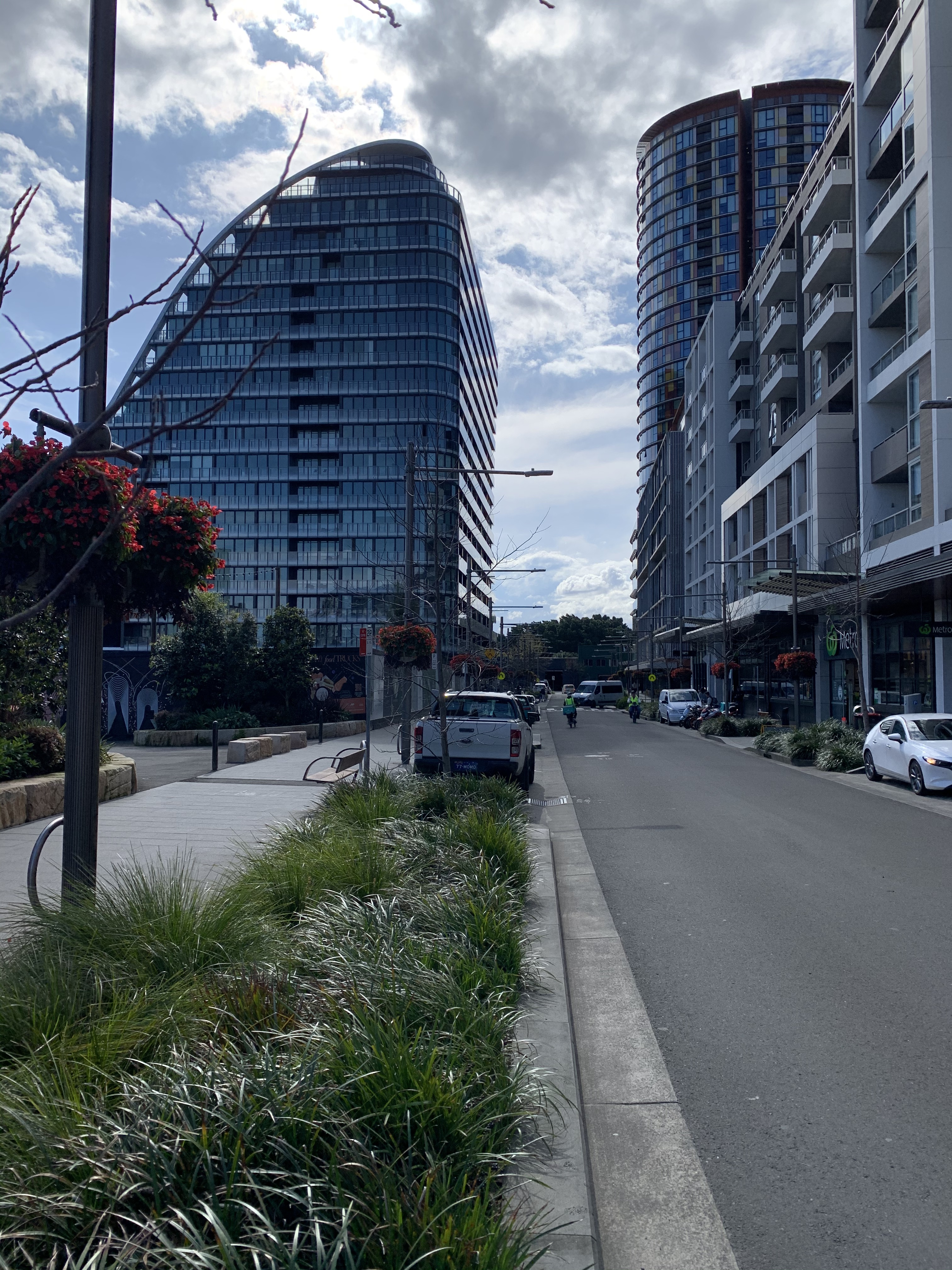
Ebsworth Street

Ebsworth Street is Sydney's first new high street in a century.

=== Green Square Library and Plaza ===
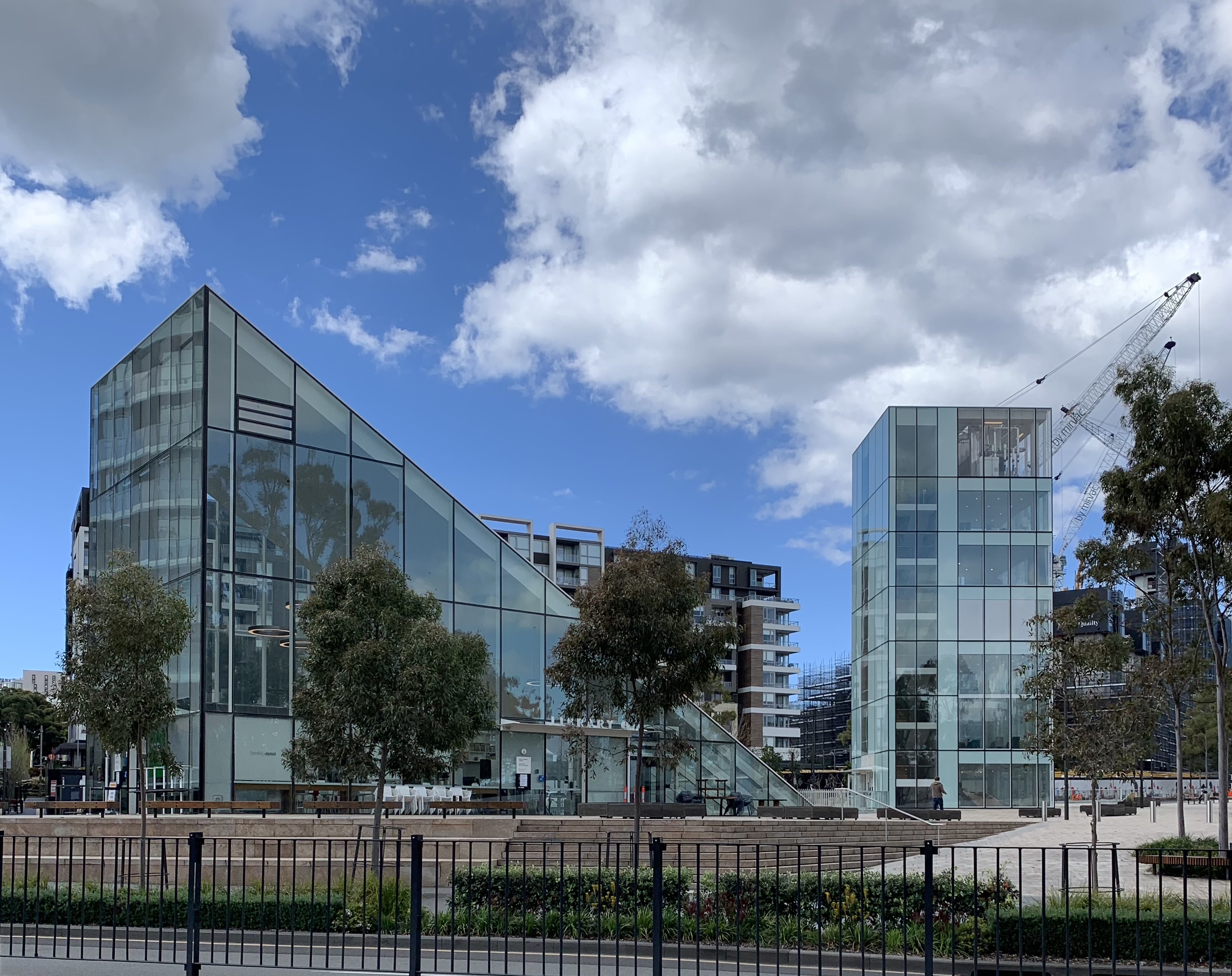
Green Square Library and Plaza

Green Square Library and Plaza is an urban living space located at the heart of the Green Square Town Centre and includes a 3,000 sqm library and an 8,000sqm plaza. The commission was won through an anonymous global design competition with the scheme unanimously selected by the jury, which included Pritzker Prize winner Glenn Murcutt.

The library and plaza achieved a 5-star rating from the Green Building Council of Australia. Its sustainability features include a central wastewater system and a low energy displacement ventilation system within the library bookshelves. In response to its location within the water table, the underground library utilises a 3 layer waterproofing system.

=== Gunyama Park Aquatic and Recreation Centre ===
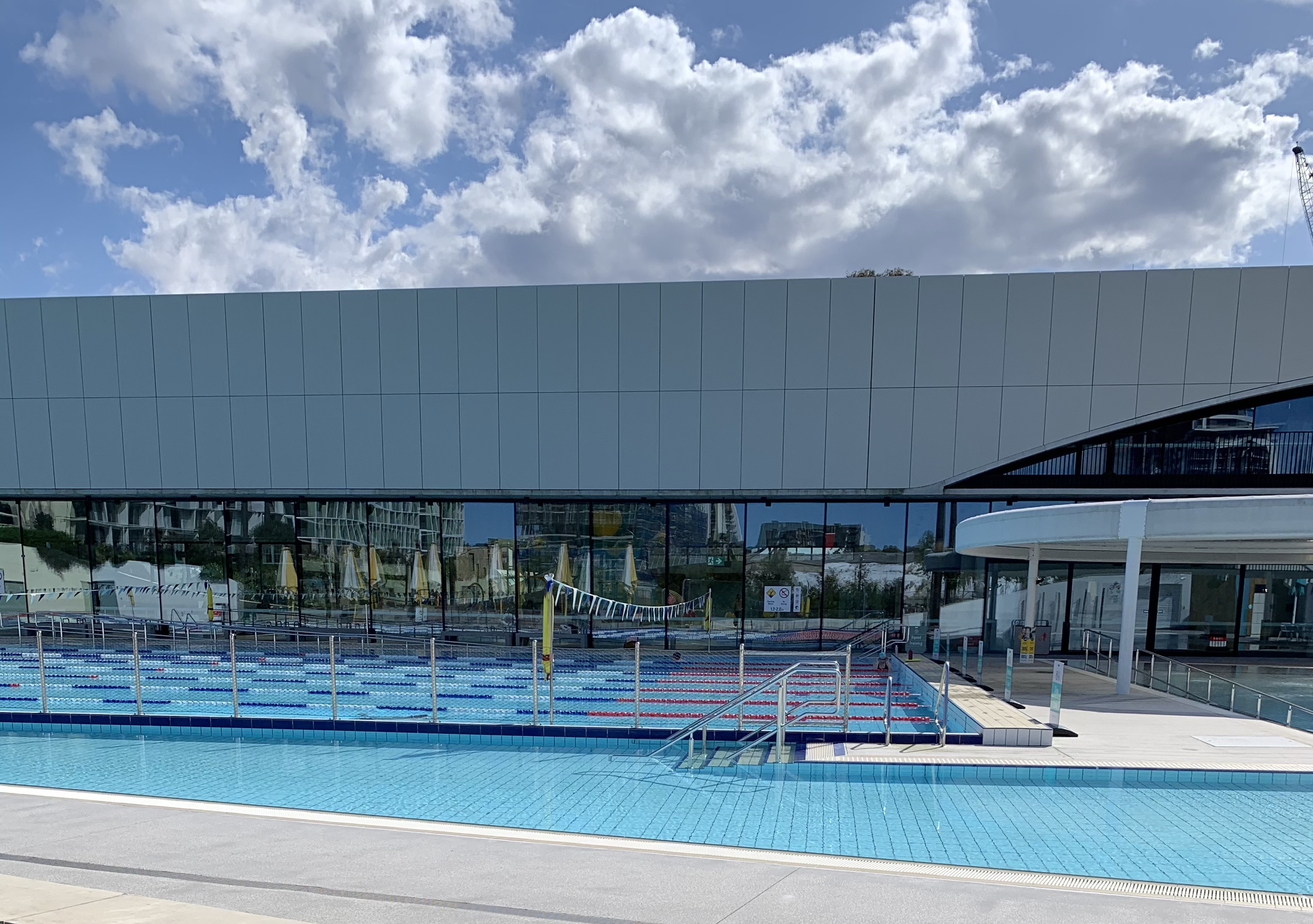
Gunyama Park Aquatic Centre

The Gunyama Park Aquatic and Recreation Centre has taken out a public architecture award at the Australian Institute of Architects Awards. The jury described it as "playful work that inspires a consideration of how the enjoyment of water-based environments has developed the psyche of an entire culture". The centre's new pool, modelled on Sydney's iconic beaches, is the biggest built in Sydney since the 2000 Olympic Games. With lap pools, exercise areas and chillout zones, Gunyama Park is part of the city's commitment to build sustainable facilities that meet the diverse needs of the community.

=== Drying Green ===
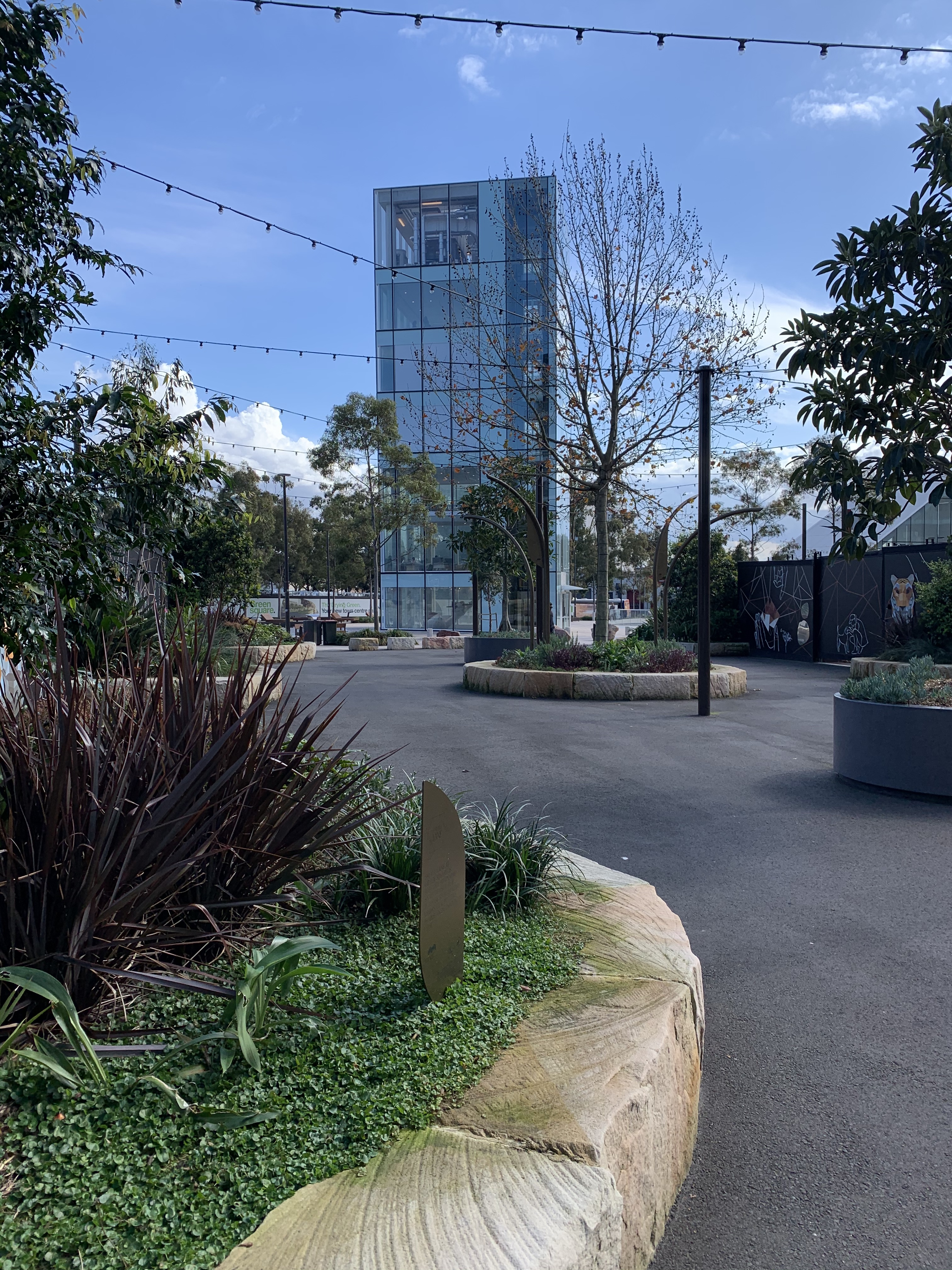
Drying Green entrance

A 6,200 square metre park which is bound by Portman Street, Geddes Avenue, Paul Street and Zetland Avenue.

=== Green Square Primary School ===
The new primary school will provide fit-for-purpose learning spaces and include additional facilities designed for both school and community use. Architect BVN's competition-winning design also includes spaces that can be used at night and on weekends by the broader community. The City of Sydney has committed $25 million towards the integrated community facilities that will be shared by local residents and businesses outside of school hours. The new school will be built on the old South Sydney Hospital site on Joynton Avenue. It will sit next to the Waranara Early Learning Centre, across the road from the Gunyama Park Aquatic Centre and close to the Green Square Library.

=== Railway Operations Centre (ROC) ===
Sydney's entire rail network is controlled by the state-of-the-art Rail Operations Centre (ROC) which was built in 2019. The 2,000-square-metre, four-storey facility is located in Wyndham Street near Green Square.

Sydney Trains' ROC controls Sydney's rail network by incorporating many different systems into this single location. The ROC incorporates a 33m display screen which is the largest display screen in the Southern Hemisphere.

=== O'Riordan Street Park ===
At 22 O'Riordan Street, a park for residents of Green Square is planned. The City of Sydney purchased the 7,436 sq/m site in December 2024 for $70 million. (Note: Or $80.3 million) The council plans to begin construction in approximately 2028. Jess Miller told the Melbourne Assembly forum in 2026 it was important to provide amenity for future local residents in adjacent towers.

Before the purchase, a 38 megawatt 3-5 storey datacentre was being planned on the site. The estimated development cost was $2 billion.

The land was previously sold in 2019 for $61.2m.

== Streets ==
=== Ngamuru Avenue ===
Ngamuru Avenue is a street with a single traffic lane in each direction and a 2-way cycleway. "Ngamuru" is a word from the Gadigal language - nga (see), muru (path). This means 'to see the way' or 'compass'.

It was previously known as the "Green Square to Ashmore connector" (GS2AC).

The street was originally investigated in the Green Square Structural Masterplan 1997. The street was presented on option 1 for the South Sydney Development Corporation Green Square plan as "Cross Street". It was also identified as "New Cross Street" in a 2004 traffic study.

== History ==
Urban planning for Green Square began in 1995, shortly after the announcement of the Airport Link railway line and Green Square railway station. The structural masterplan was prepared by Stanisic Turner and HASSELL in 1998.

== Rental market ==
Due to the convenience of the locality, the proximity to the CBD, the available public facilities, and the overall desirability of the suburb, rents in the area have surged.

In 1999, an affordable housing scheme was introduced for Green Square, requiring 3% of residential floor area and 1% of commercial floor area was provided as affordable housing. From only a minimum of 50 square metres at the time, a later planning proposal proposed the minimum size of any affordable housing dwelling was reduced to 35 square metres, and the maximum dwelling size of 90 metres be introduced, along with a 12% proportion of new floor area between March 2017 and February 2018.

== In popular culture ==
A season of Beauty and the Geek Australia, which is an Australian reality television series was filmed in buildings in Green Square.

Buildings in the area have hosted fashion events and Skye Suites is the official hotel partner for the Afterpay Australian Fashion Week (AAFW).

== Transportation ==
Green Square railway station is an underground railway station served by the Airport & South Line. The area is well served by buses, passing through Green Square and Zetland.

Green Square Town Centre can be accessed by bicycle or on foot from South Eveleigh and the Sydney CBD.

On a typical day in 2023, 15% of Green Square residents cycled to their place of work or study.

=== Light rail proposal ===
Proposals have been made for a light rail line from Green Square to Central railway station via Zetland, and continuing to Parramatta Road.

In July 2015, New South Wales Transport Minister Andrew Constance stated the Green Square area was likely to be served by a light rail link in the future. This led to a decision in October by the City of Sydney to allocate $445,000 to develop plans for a light rail line from the city to Green Square. The council estimated a link would cost $350-500 million to build.

== See also ==
Two other large-scale, inner-city urban renewal projects in Sydney:

- Barangaroo, New South Wales
- Central Park, Sydney
