= Zetland, New South Wales =

Zetland
- Suburb
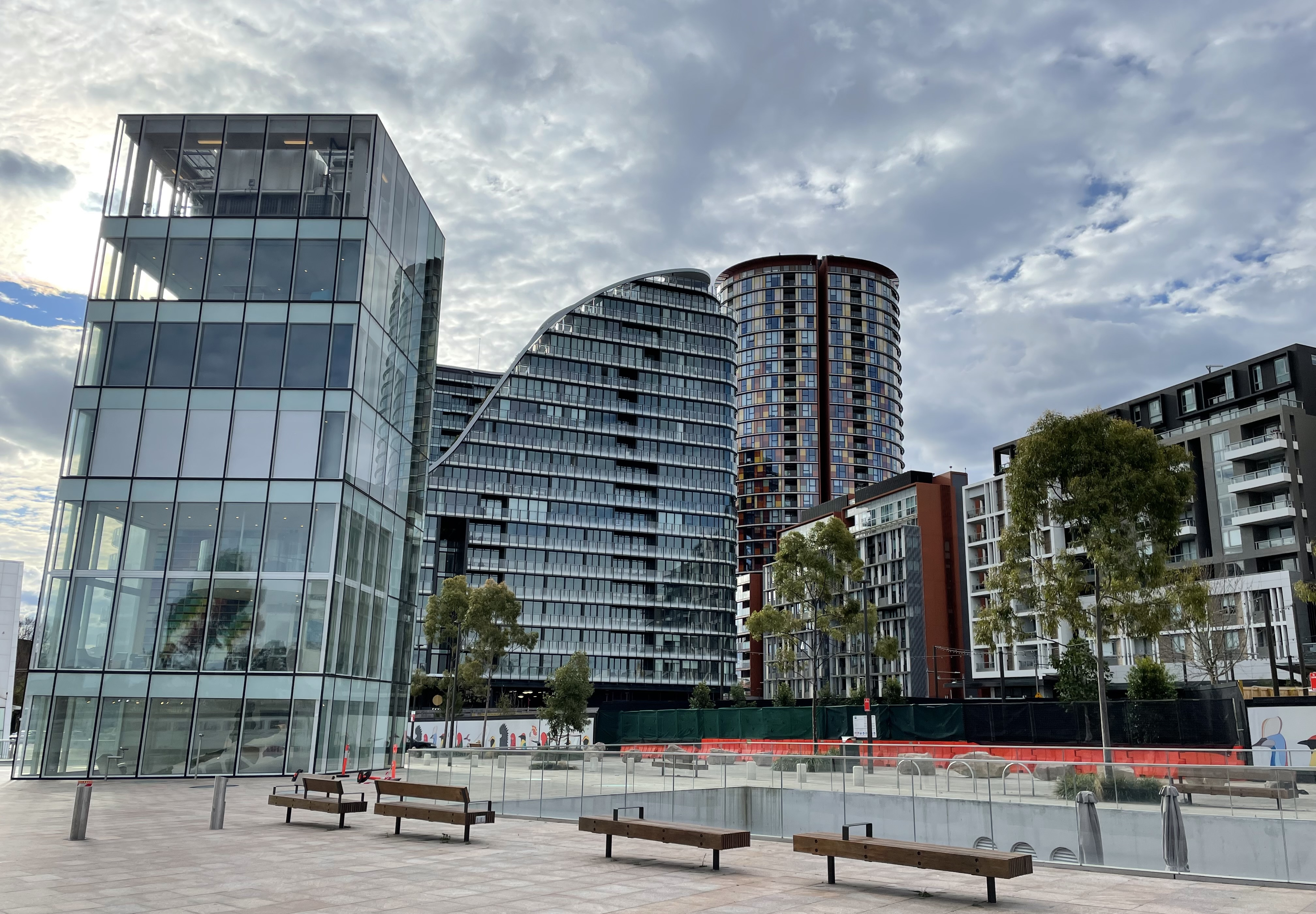
- Green Square

- Interactive map of Zetland
- Country: Australia
- State: New South Wales
- City: Sydney
- LGA: City of Sydney
- Location: 4 km (2.5 mi) south of Sydney CBD

Government
  - State electorate: Heffron
  - Federal division: Sydney

Area
  - Total: 0.80 km^{2} (0.31 sq mi)
- Elevation: 23 m (75 ft)

Population
  - Total: 12,622 (SAL 2021)
  - Density: 15,680/km^{2} (40,600/sq mi)
- Time zone: UTC+10 (AEST)
  - Summer (DST): UTC+11 (AEDT)
- Postcode: 2017
Suburbs around Zetland
Alexandria	Waterloo	Moore Park
Alexandria	Zetland	Kensington
Beaconsfield	Rosebery	Kensington

Zetland is an inner southern suburb of Sydney, New South Wales, Australia. It is located 4 kilometres south of the Sydney central business district, in the local government area of the City of Sydney. Zetland recorded a population of 12,622 at the 2021 census.

Zetland is part of the Green Square Town Centre district. The Green Square Plaza is surrounded by Sydney's newest high street, Ebsworth Street, the Gunyama Park Aquatic Centre, parklands, upscale and luxurious apartments, a library, and retail tenancies controlled by Mirvac.

Zetland is a residential suburb with medium- to high-density residential areas.

== History ==
Zetland was named after Zetland Lodge, a horse training stable established in 1874 by Governor Sir Hercules Robinson. The stable was presumably named after Thomas Dundas, 2nd Earl of Zetland, Grand Master of the British Masons from 1844 to 1870, who was a friend of Governor, himself a mason. Zetland is an archaic spelling of Shetland.

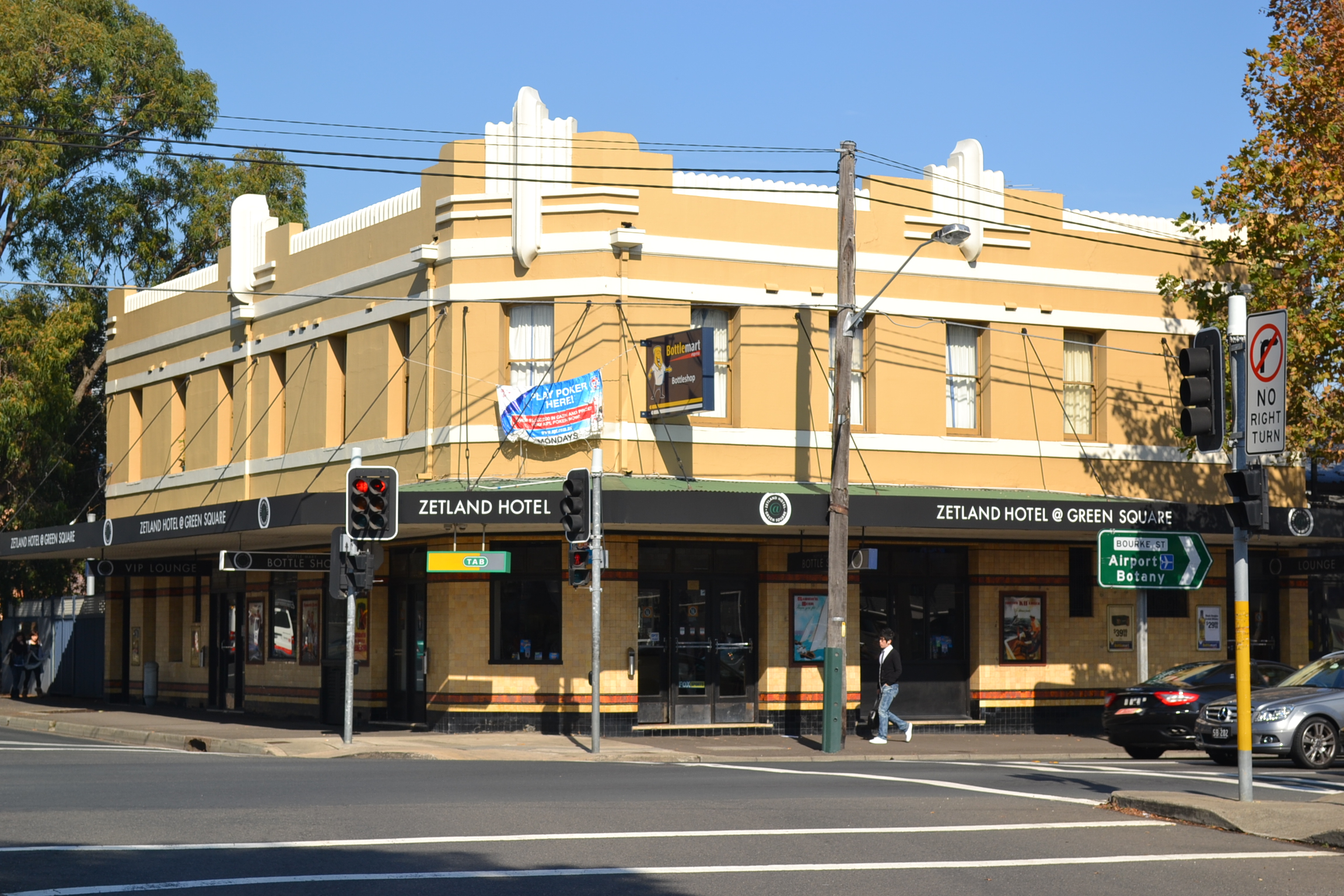
Zetland Hotel

Zetland originally featured a lagoon and wetlands which was drained in the early 1900s to create the Victoria Park racecourse. It was bordered by O’Dea Avenue, South Dowling Street, Epsom Road and Joynton Avenue. The privately owned racecourse was closed after World War II. The land was bought by British businessman Lord Nuffield in 1947 and from 1950 the site was utilised by Nuffield Australia for a motor vehicle assembly facility. Vehicle production was continued by Nuffield Australia and its successors BMC Australia and Leyland Australia until the factory was closed in 1975. The site was acquired by the Commonwealth of Australia for a Naval Stores depot which operated until the mid-1990s. The land was subsequently redeveloped into high density housing (location: 33.908°S 151.2105°E).

Zetland Post Office was first opened on 4 January 1937 and closed on 29 September 1983.

=== Former tram line ===
From 1902 a tram service operated through Zetland. The line initially ran via Chalmers and Redfern Streets and south along Elizabeth Street to Zetland. In 1924, the line was extended to Epsom Road in Rosebery. In 1948, to facilitate the construction of the Eastern Suburbs Railway, a new line was constructed down Elizabeth Street between Devonshire Street and Redfern Street and the route was deviated to run down this new section. The line was electrified double track throughout. The line was closed in 1957.

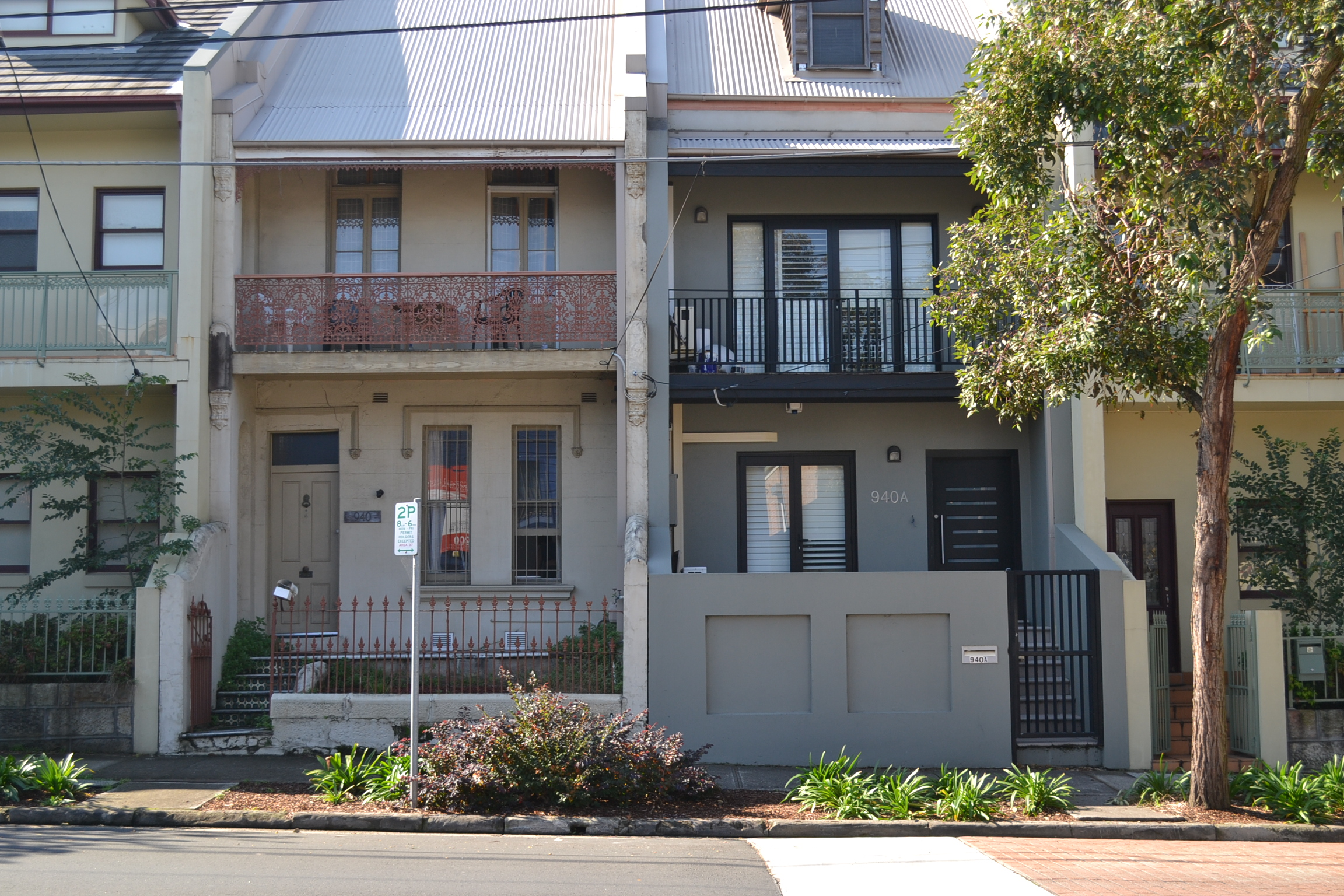
Terraced Houses

== Demographics ==
At the 2021 census, the suburb of Zetland recorded a population of 12,622.

Age distribution
The distribution of ages in Zetland was younger than the country as a whole. Zetland residents' median age was 30 years, compared to the national median of 39.
Ethnic diversity
32.3% of people were born in Australia. The most common other countries of birth were China 20.5%, England 5.0%, Ireland 3.3%, Indonesia 2.4% and Hong Kong 2.1%. Zetland has the highest number of Brazilians living in Sydney. Over 2% of residents in Zetland were born in Brazil, which is higher than the beachside suburbs of Bondi Beach, Tamarama, and Bronte. Over 2% of the residents in Zetland speak Portuguese, and approximately 5% of the residents in Zetland speak Portuguese and Spanish. This is higher than the suburb of Petersham, which was previously known as the suburb with the highest percentage of Portuguese speakers.
Religion
The most common responses for religion were No Religion 54.2% and Catholic 17.2%.

At the 2016 census, there were 10,078 people living in Zetland.

== Transport ==
Zetland is a transport hub with rail, bus and cycle way connections to the rest of the city. Green Square railway station on the Airport & South Line of the Sydney Trains network is located on the southwestern edge of Zetland.

== See also ==
- Victoria Park racecourse
- Royal South Sydney Hospital
