= Royal South Sydney Hospital =

Former hospital in Australia

Coordinates: 33.909076°S 151.206404°E

Royal South Sydney Hospital was a hospital in the southern Sydney suburb of Zetland, New South Wales, Australia. Its location is the present-day 3 Joynton Avenue, Zetland.

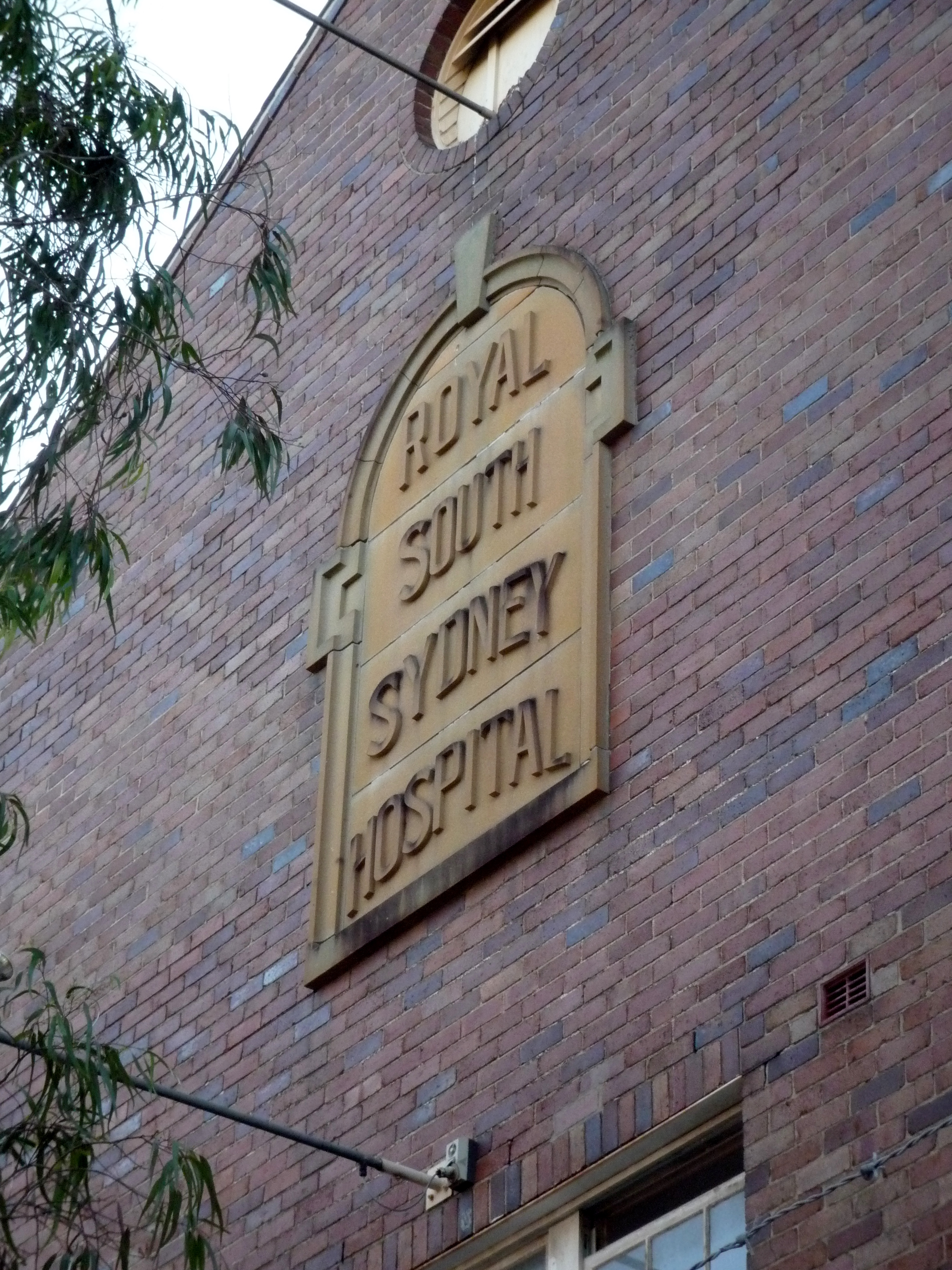
Plaque on the remains of the Royal South Sydney Hospital.

== History ==
Initial efforts to open a hospital in South Sydney began in 1908 when fundraising efforts by local residents saw James Joynton Smith, local businessman and racecourse owner, elected as provisional president of a future hospital. In 1912, construction of a 25 bed public hospital began and was opened in 1913. In 1917, the title of Royal was bestowed upon the hospital by the King, and capacity was expanded to 110 beds the following year.

In 1976, the present brick buildings were constructed and opened, and the hospital began to specialise in rehabilitation, orthopaedics and community health. In 1991, the hospital merged with the Prince of Wales and Prince Henry Hospitals. General hospital services, including (controversially) the emergency department were slowly wound down until only community services operated from the location until 2003, when the hospital finally closed and the site was transferred to the South Sydney City Council (later, City of Sydney council).

=== Current state ===
The site was disused for a long time until it was redeveloped as part of the Green Square town square development in the late 2010s. Some of the buildings were preserved. The former nurses’ quarters was redeveloped into the Joynton Avenue Creative Centre, winning the Australian Institute of Architect’s NSW Architecture Medallion and officially opening in May 2018.
