= Enginemans Resthouse =

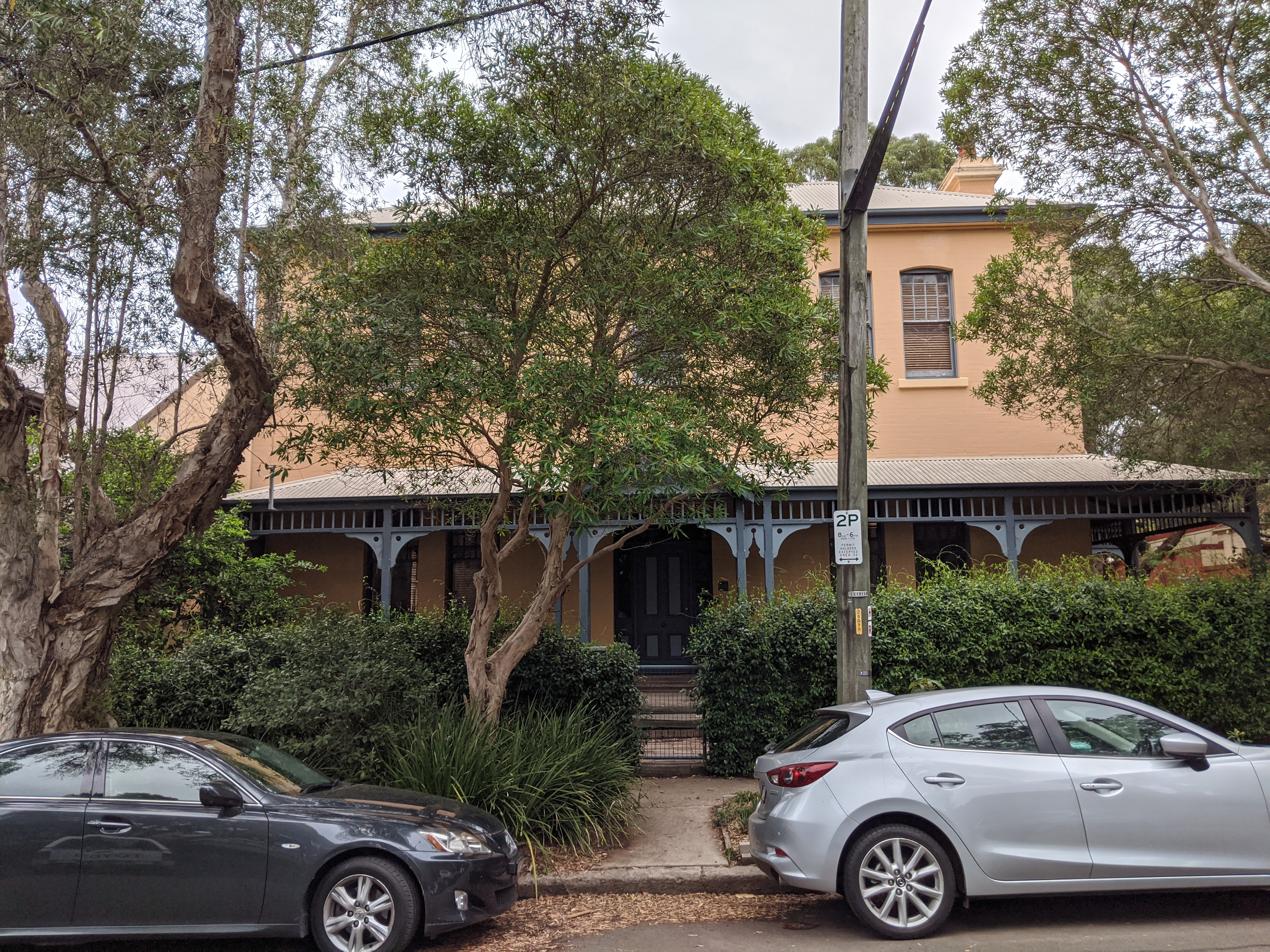
- Enginemans Resthouse, 39 Brandling Street, Alexandria, New South Wales

- Location within New South Wales Location within Australia
- 33.8984°S 151.1911°E
- Location: 39 Brandling Street, Alexandria, City of Sydney, New South Wales, Australia

History
- Built: 1902–1903

New South Wales Heritage Register
- Official name: Enginemans Resthouse
- Type: state heritage (built)
- Designated: 2 April 1999
- Reference no.: 723
- Type: Other - Residential Buildings (private)
- Category: Residential buildings (private)

Enginemans Resthouse is a heritage-listed former railway workers' cottage, now private residence, at 39 Brandling Street, Alexandria, New South Wales, a suburb of Sydney, Australia. It was built from 1902 to 1903. It was added to the New South Wales State Heritage Register on 2 April 1999.

== History ==
The Enginemans Resthouse was built in 1902-03, when the Railway Commissioners resumed land on Brandling Street for the construction of a new barracks or dormitory to provide accommodation for train drivers, firemen and guards when they were away from their homes. The Eveleigh Railway Workshops, adjacent to the site, had a major locomotive depot for the storage and servicing of running steam locomotives. For such depots, it was normal practice to have a nearby "barracks" building to accommodate staff between shifts.

It replaced an earlier barrack which had been close to the running shed in the locomotive yard at the Eveleigh Railway Workshops, and had been requested by a proposed extension of the workshops. The Brandling Street site was selected due to its closeness to the workshops while being in a quiet neighbourhood. It was built at a cost of £2000.

The new accommodation was a large two-storey building of an expanded domestic design with 13 principal rooms, a kitchen, a dining area and a 6 ft. verandah on three sides. The dining area was occasionally used as a conference room.

The building was used by the State Rail Authority's fire protection services during the 1980s and 1990s. It is now used as a private residence. It remains little altered from its original appearance and layout.

== Description ==
The former Enginemans Resthouse is a two-storey Edwardian mansion on a quiet street featuring single or double storey late Victorian or Federation dwellings.

The building is of Federation/ Edwardian style. It is surrounded by gardens and has verandas on three sides, paved with flagstones. The corridors runs in the middle of the house at both floor levels. The middle entrance is flanked with 2 windows on the ground level and 5 windows are displayed at the first level. All external walls are rendered and painted and the hipped roof is clad with corrugated iron roofing.

== Heritage listing ==
Enginemans Resthouse was listed on the New South Wales State Heritage Register on 2 April 1999. It is the largest of the few surviving railway barracks buildings in the State.
