= Beaconsfield, New South Wales =

Suburb of Sydney, Australia

Beaconsfield
- Suburb
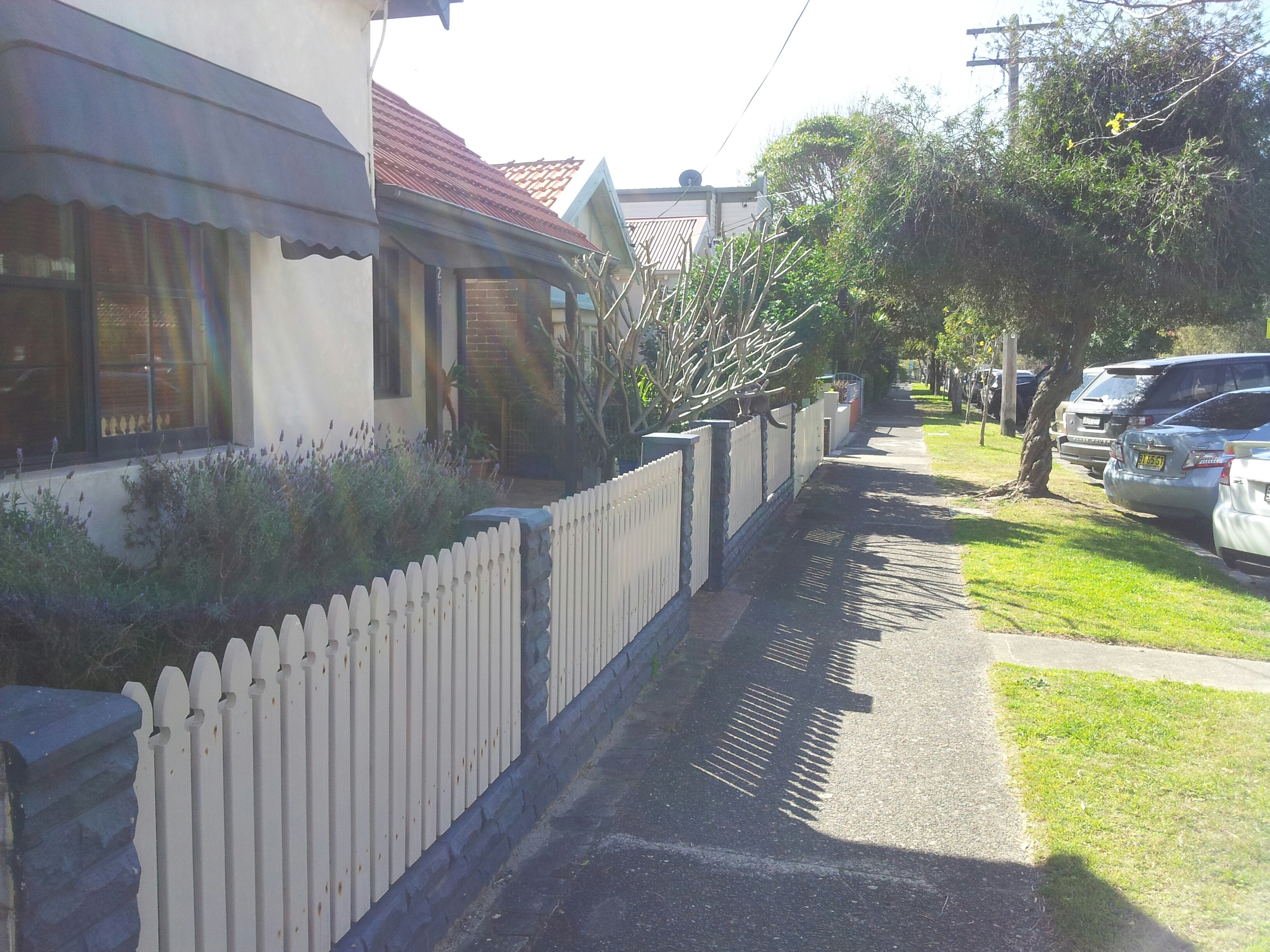
- A residential street in Beaconsfield

- Interactive map of Beaconsfield
- Country: Australia
- State: New South Wales
- City: Sydney
- LGA: City of Sydney
- Location: 5 km (3.1 mi) south of Sydney CBD

Government
  - State electorate: Heffron
  - Federal division: Sydney

Area
  - Total: 0.15 km^{2} (0.058 sq mi)
- Elevation: 20 m (66 ft)

Population
  - Total: 1,172 (SAL 2021)
  - Density: 7,736/km^{2} (20,040/sq mi)
- Postcode: 2015
Suburbs around Beaconsfield
Alexandria	Alexandria	Zetland
Alexandria	Beaconsfield	Rosebery
Alexandria	Alexandria	Rosebery

Beaconsfield is a small inner southern suburb of Sydney, Australia. Beaconsfield is located 5 kilometres south of the Sydney central business district and is part of the local government area of the City of Sydney.

Beaconsfield has a mixture of industrial and medium to high density residential areas.

Beaconsfield is part of the Green Square district which is currently undergoing gentrification. This involves an urban renewal project that is constructing modern retail, business and residential developments.

== History ==
The original Aboriginal inhabitants and traditional custodians of the land on which Beaconsfield is situated are the Gadigal of the Eora nation.

The early Waterloo-Alexandria-Beaconsfield landscape was initially estuarine, comprising what would become known as Waterloo Swamp which was joined by Sheas Creek. It included a number of watercourses that provided a habitat for abundant bird life, eels, and other animals. Eora coastal people lived on fish and shellfish in the sand dunes and wetlands here.

At the time of first contact, the traditional Aboriginal track and trading route from Sydney Harbour to the south passed through this place, roughly following the course of today’s Botany Road which now defines the eastern boundary of Beaconsfield.

The area was particularly important in the years immediately after 1788 because it was the country linking the two pivotal places in the early settlement: Sydney Cove/Warrane and Botany Bay/Kamay (Sydney’s two main waterways). It became a major interface between Aboriginal people and Europeans.

The suburb was named after Benjamin Disraeli, Lord Beaconsfield, a British prime minister during the reign of Queen Victoria. The area was part of the suburb of Alexandria and was officially gazetted on 10 June 1977.

== Demographics ==
At the 2021 census, 1,172 people were living in Beaconsfield, compared to 987 people in 2016. 59.8% of residents were born in Australia. The most common other countries of birth were England (3.8%), Indonesia (3.3%), New Zealand (2.9%), Hong Kong (1.9%) and China (excludes SARs (1.8%)). 70.5% of residents spoke only English at home. Other languages spoken at home included Cantonese (3.8%), Mandarin (2.9%), Indonesian (2.6%), Spanish (2.0%) and French (1.8%). The most common responses for religious affiliation were no religion (51.0%), Catholic (19.8%), Anglican (5.5%) and Buddhist (2.8%).

== Transport ==
The nearest train station to Beaconsfield is Green Square, located just north of the suburb. It is served by Sydney Trains T8 Airport & South Line services.

Beaconsfield Park	Beaconsfield terrace houses
