= Division of Sydney =

Australian federal electoral division

Coordinates: 33.895°S 151.200°E

Sydney Australian House of Representatives Division
- Interactive map of electorate boundaries from the 2025 federal election
- Created: 1968
- MP: Tanya Plibersek
- Party: Labor
- Namesake: Sydney
- Electors: 127,495 (2025)
- Area: 45 km^{2} (17.4 sq mi)
- Demographic: Inner metropolitan
Electorates around Sydney:
Reid	Bennelong	Warringah
Grayndler	Sydney	Wentworth
Grayndler	Kingsford Smith	Kingsford Smith

The Division of Sydney is an Australian electoral division in the state of New South Wales. It is centred on and named after the city of Sydney, the state capital. The division encompasses Sydney CBD and surrounding areas to the south and west, as well as Lord Howe Island in the Tasman Sea.

Since 1998 its MP has been Tanya Plibersek of the Labor Party.

== History ==
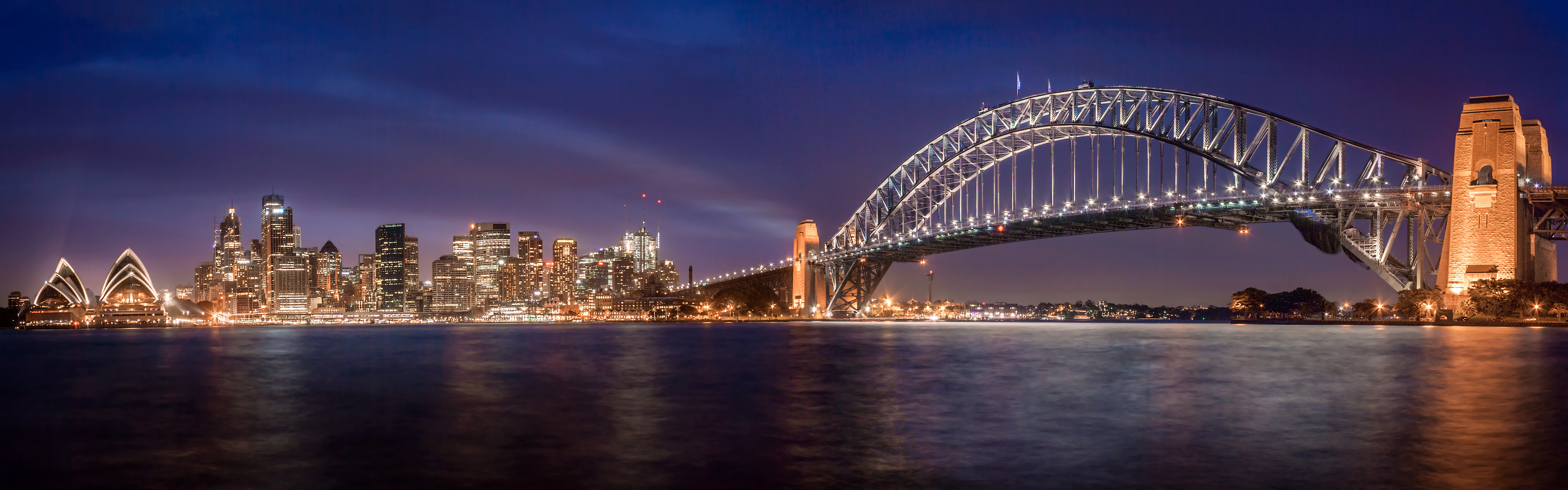
The city of Sydney, here seen from the north shore, the division's namesake

The division draws its name from Sydney, the most populous city in Australia, which itself was named after former British Home Secretary Thomas Townshend, 1st Viscount Sydney. The division was proclaimed at the redistribution of 21 November 1968, replacing the old Division of Dalley, Division of East Sydney and Division of West Sydney; it was first contested at the 1969 election.

The seat is a safe seat for the Australian Labor Party (ALP) which has never polled less than 60% of the two-party preferred vote at any election. In line with a national trend towards progressive inner-city voting, the seat had the highest number of Green votes in any federal electorate in 2004, though by 2013 it had dropped to seventh-highest. The current Member for the Division of Sydney, since the 1998 federal election, is Tanya Plibersek, a member of the ALP. Sydney is currently Labor's third safest seat, with 70.95% on the 2CP against the Greens.

As at the 2001 census, the electorate had the highest number of same-sex couples in Australia (2,265). In the Australian Marriage Law Postal Survey in 2017, the electorate had the second-highest percentage of "Yes" responses in the country, with 83.67% of the electorate's respondents to the survey responding "Yes" in favour of same-sex marriage.

== Geography ==
The division is located around the City of Sydney and includes many inner suburbs such as Alexandria, Balmain, Beaconsfield, Birchgrove, Broadway, Chippendale, Darlington, Erskineville, Forest Lodge, Glebe, Haymarket, Millers Point, Pyrmont, Redfern, Rosebery, The Rocks, Rozelle, Ultimo, Waterloo, Zetland and parts of Annandale, Camperdown, Lilyfield and Newtown in the Inner West, as well as Surry Hills and parts of Darlinghurst, Woolloomooloo and Kings Cross in the Eastern Suburbs. Lord Howe Island, in the Tasman Sea and some 400 kilometres (250 mi) north-east of the Sydney central business district, is included in the division; as are the harbour islands from Spectacle Island to the Sydney Heads, and all the waters of Port Jackson, except for Middle Harbour and North Harbour.

Since 1984, federal electoral division boundaries in Australia have been determined at redistributions by a redistribution committee appointed by the Australian Electoral Commission. Redistributions occur for the boundaries of divisions in a particular state, and they occur every seven years, or sooner if a state's representation entitlement changes or when divisions of a state are malapportioned.

== Members ==
Image	Member	Party	Term	Notes
	Jim Cope (1907–1999)	Labor	25 October 1969 – 11 November 1975	Previously held the Division of Watson. Served as Speaker during the Whitlam government. Retired
	Les McMahon (1930–2015)	Labor	13 December 1975 – 4 February 1983	Lost preselection and retired
	Peter Baldwin (1951–)	Labor	5 March 1983 – 31 August 1998	Previously a member of the New South Wales Legislative Council. Served as minister in the Hawke and Keating governments. Retired
	Tanya Plibersek (1969–)	Labor	3 October 1998 – present	Served as minister in the Rudd and Gillard governments. Incumbent. Currently an Albanese government minister

== Election results ==
2025 Australian federal election: Sydney
Party	Candidate	Votes	%	±%
Labor	Tanya Plibersek	59,153	55.15	+4.10
Greens	Luc Velez	23,162	21.60	−1.12
Liberal	Alex Xu	18,860	17.59	−1.77
One Nation	Vedran Torbarac	3,698	3.45	+1.68
Socialist Alliance	Rachel Evans	2,376	2.22	+0.97
Total formal votes		107,249	96.27	−0.31
Informal votes		4,161	3.73	+0.31
Turnout		111,410	87.42	−2.46
Notional two-party-preferred count
Labor	Tanya Plibersek	83,737	78.08	+2.42
Liberal	Alex Xu	23,512	21.92	−2.42
Two-candidate-preferred result
Labor	Tanya Plibersek	76,089	70.95	+4.73
Greens	Luc Velez	31,160	29.05	−4.73
Labor hold		Swing	+4.73	
