= Alexandria, New South Wales =

Alexandria
- Suburb
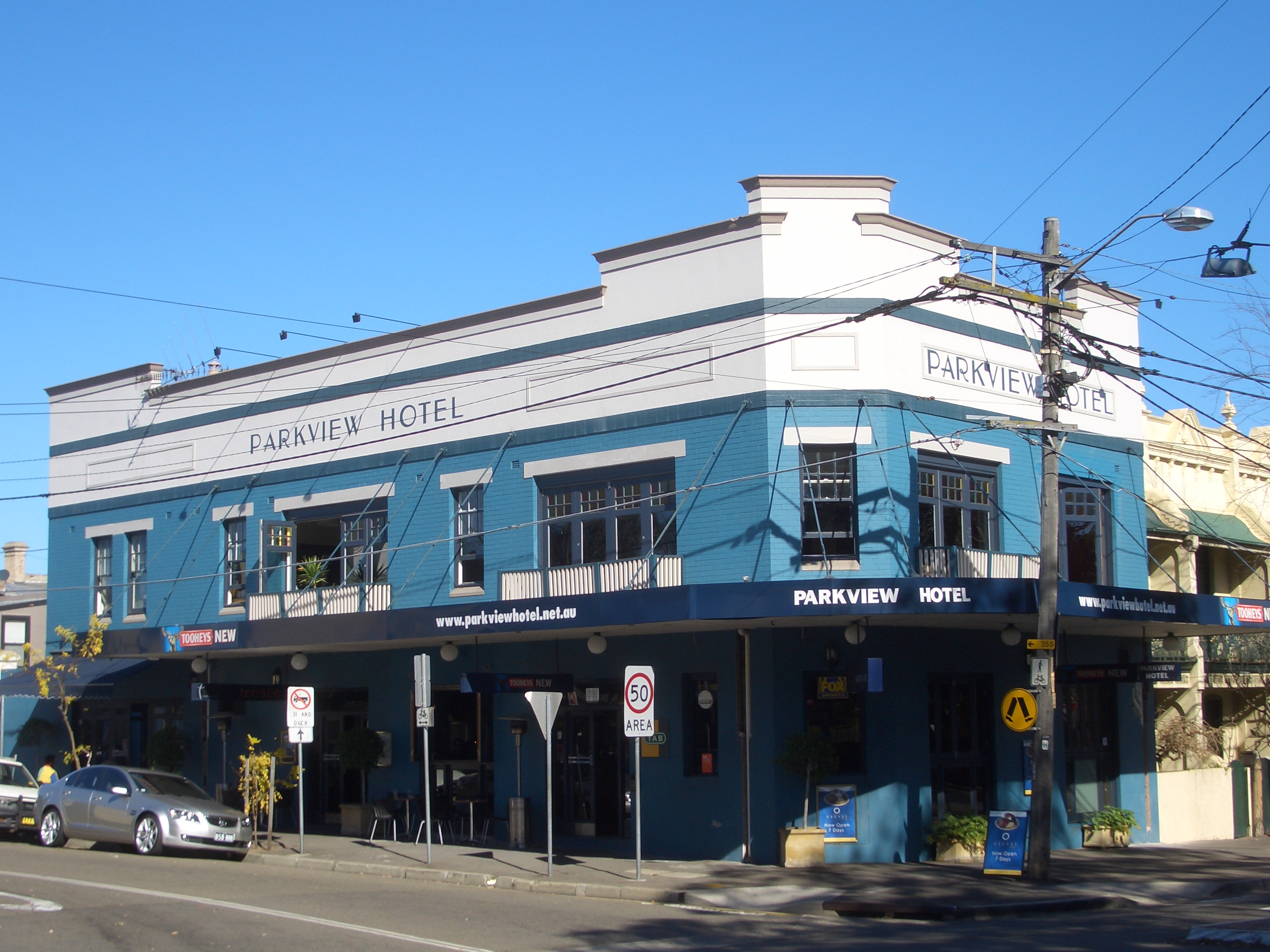
- Parkview Hotel, Mitchell Road

- Interactive map of Alexandria
- Coordinates: 33°54′06″S 151°12′00″E
- Country: Australia
- State: New South Wales
- City: Sydney
- LGA: City of Sydney
- Location: 4 km (2.5 mi) south of Sydney CBD

Government
  - State electorates: Heffron; Newtown
  - Federal division: Sydney

Area
  - Total: 3.54 km^{2} (1.37 sq mi)
- Elevation: 15 m (49 ft)

Population
  - Total: 9,649 (SAL 2021)
  - Density: 2,726/km^{2} (7,060/sq mi)
- Postcode: 2015
Suburbs around Alexandria
Erskineville	Eveleigh	Redfern, Waterloo
Newtown	Alexandria	Zetland, Beaconsfield
St Peters	Mascot	Green Square, Rosebery

Alexandria is an inner southern suburb of Sydney, New South Wales, Australia. Alexandria is located 5 kilometres south of the Sydney central business district and is part of the local government area of the City of Sydney. The postcode is 2015.

The rough boundaries of Alexandria are Botany Road to the east, Gardeners Road to the south, Mitchell Road and Sydney Park to the west, and Boundary Road to the north. It is approximately 3.5 km south of Central station.

== History ==
The Parish of Alexandria was established in 1835. The naming of Alexandria and neighbouring Waterloo commemorates the famous British Empire military and naval victories over Napoleon – the Battles of Alexandria and Waterloo. The Iron Duke Hotel in Alexandria is itself named after the Duke of Wellington, as is Wellington Street in Waterloo. It was thought Alexandria may have been named after Princess Alexandra, Queen consort of King Edward VII, however, Alexandra was born on 1 December 1844 and the parish's naming predates the birth of Alexandra by six years.

In 1868, the Municipality of Alexandria was formed, after separating from Waterloo. The former Alexandria Town Hall is in Garden Street. Land for the building was acquired in 1879; the building was designed by Ferdinand Reuss Snr and completed in 1881. Major alterations took place over the years, right up to 1928. The building is listed on the New South Wales State Heritage Register.

By 1943, Alexandria was the largest industrial district in Australia, and known as the "Birmingham of Australia", with everything from bricks to aeroplanes manufactured in 550 factories in just 1,000 acres (4.0 km^{2}). The municipality was abolished upon merger into the City of Sydney in 1949, along with Darlington, Erskineville, Newtown, Redfern, Waterloo, Paddington and The Glebe.

In 1968, the boundaries were changed again and Alexandria was part of a new municipality, South Sydney Council. South Sydney was brought back into the City of Sydney in 1982 and then became separate again under the City of Sydney Act of 1988. In 2004, Alexandria moved back into the City of Sydney, when the City of Sydney was merged with the City of South Sydney.

=== Trams ===
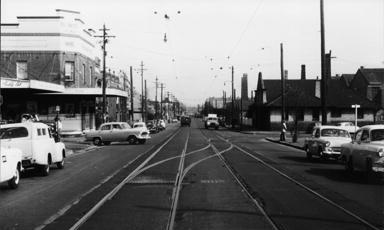
Tram lines, Mitchell Road, early 1950s

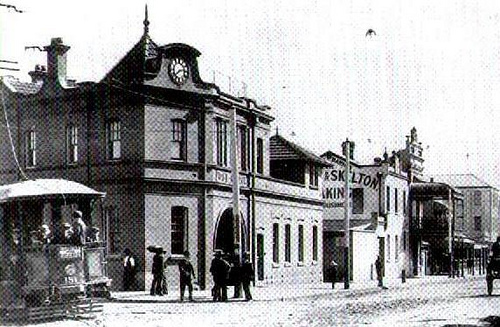
Tram from Mitchell Road in Henderson Road early 1900s

The former Alexandria tram line opened in 1902 as a single-track electric line that was duplicated in 1910. The line branched off from the Botany line at the junction of Henderson and Botany Roads in Alexandria. The line proceeded down Henderson Road then swung left into Mitchell Road. A turn-back was provided at Ashmore Road (near Erskineville Oval) for short working. The line turned right into the present day Sydney Park Road (then known as an extension of Mitchell Road) before terminating at the junction with the Cook's River line at the Princes Highway near St Peters railway station. Services operated from Circular Quay in a route similar to the Botany line as far as the Henderson Road junction. The line was closed in 1959. Transit Systems route 308 generally follows the route as far as St Peters station.

== Heritage listings ==
Alexandria has a number of heritage-listed sites, including:

- Alexandra Canal
- 39 Brandling Street: Enginemans Resthouse
- 16-22 Retreat Street: Yiu Ming Temple

== Demographics ==
At the 2021 census, there were 9,649 people living in Alexandria. At the 2016 census, Alexandria had a population of 8,262.

Aboriginal and Torres Strait Islander people made up 1.8% of the population. The most common ancestries in Alexandria were Australian 31.6%, English 24.3%, Irish 13.6%, Chinese 10.1% and Scottish 9.9%. 59.9% of people were born in Australia. The most common other countries of birth were England 5.1%, New Zealand 3.3%, China (excludes SARs and Taiwan) 2.6%, the United States 1.4% and Indonesia 1.2%. 74.1% of people spoke only English at home. Other languages spoken at home included Mandarin 3.1%, Spanish 2.0%, Cantonese 1.9%, Portuguese 1.0% and Indonesian 1.0%. The most common responses for religion in Alexandria were No Religion 57.2%, Catholic 16.4%, Anglican 5.0% and Buddhism 3.0%. 65.2% of residences were flats and 29.0% were semi-detached, row or terrace house, townhouse etc.

== Commercial area ==
Alexandria is a largely industrial suburb with medium to high density residential areas. The suburb was once mostly terraced housing, that was demolished for light industrial use and warehousing which continues to this day. Pockets of quiet residential areas remain along the northern boundary of the suburb, adjoining Erskineville and Waterloo.

One of the landing points of the trans-Pacific submarine telecommunications cable, the Southern Cross Cable, is located in the suburb.

== Green Square ==
Green Square is a new locality within the suburb of Alexandria. The locality is mostly made up of medium to high density housing, and is serviced by the Green Square railway station and significant cycleway infrastructure.

== South Sydney markets ==
Established in September 2009, its main purpose was to meet the community demand for local markets, providing fine produce and a venue for local handmade crafts. The children's activities kept the little ones entertained with face painting and a kids zoo. It was open every Sunday 10am - 3pm at O'Riordan St Alexandria however, it has unfortunately been temporarily closed.

== Transport ==
Alexandria is serviced by Transdev John Holland routes to the Sydney central business district. Alexandria is also close to multiple railway stations. To the east, Waterloo railway station is serviced by the Metro North West & Bankstown Line, while Green Square railway station is serviced by the Airport & South Line. To the west, Erskineville railway station and St Peters railway station are serviced by either the Airport & South Line or the Eastern Suburbs & Illawarra Line.

As of 2026, at Mitchell Road, Ashmore Street and Harley Street there is a proposal for new traffic signals.

Alexandria is transited by the McEvoy Street state road (Alexandria to Moore Park Project), which also passes through Waterloo. The Southern Arterial Route terminates in north Alexandria, and was originally proposed to run through Alexandria on Wyndham Street.

== Culture ==
- Alexandria has the headquarters of the Serbian Orthodox Eparchy of Australia and New Zealand.
- Alexandria is the location for a Chinese community centred on the Yiu Ming Temple in Retreat Street. The temple was heritage-listed in 1999, along with the terraced houses that line Retreat Street.

== Sport and recreation ==
Sydney Park is a large recreational area on the western border. Alexandria Park and McKell Playground are situated on Buckland Street. Tennis courts and a cricket oval are located here. Erskineville Oval is just over the western border. Erskineville Oval is the home ground of the Alexandria Rovers junior rugby league team. The Alexandria Dukes Rugby Football Club play in the New South Wales Suburban Rugby Union competition and will again contest the Meldrum Cup in 2014. The club rooms for the Dukes are at the Iron Duke Hotel.

== Gallery ==
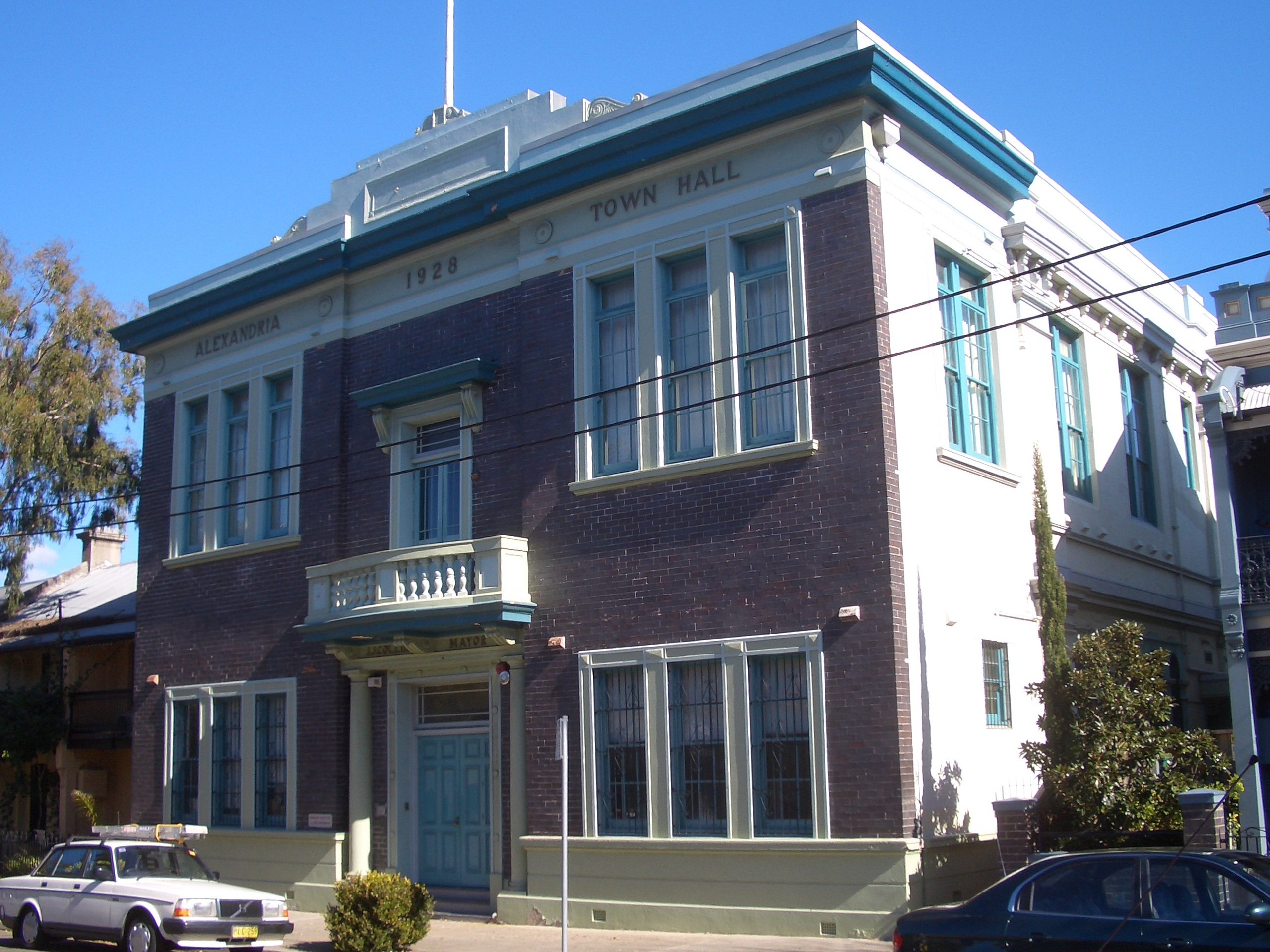
Former Alexandria Town Hall, Garden Street

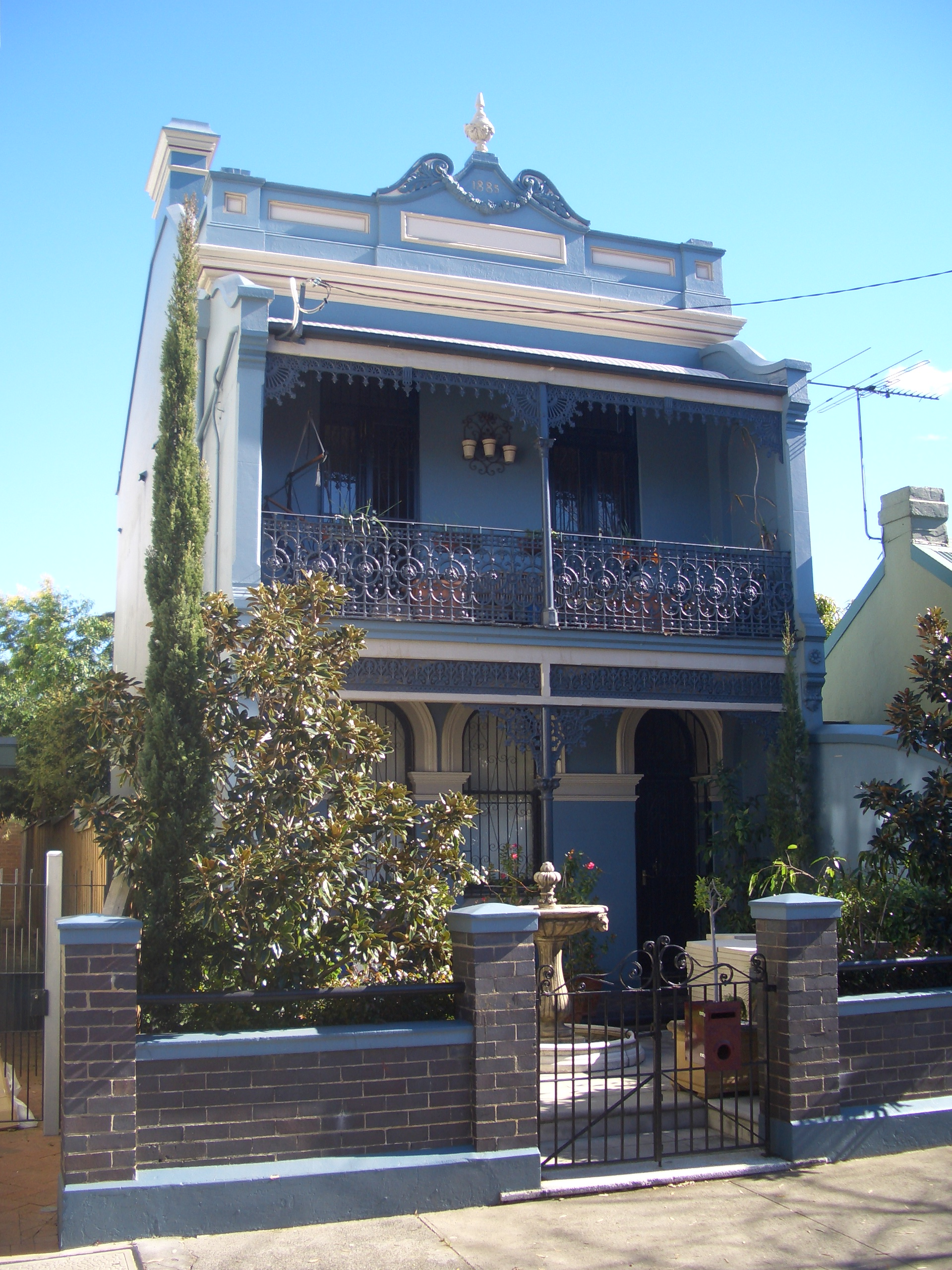
Victorian terrace house, Garden Street

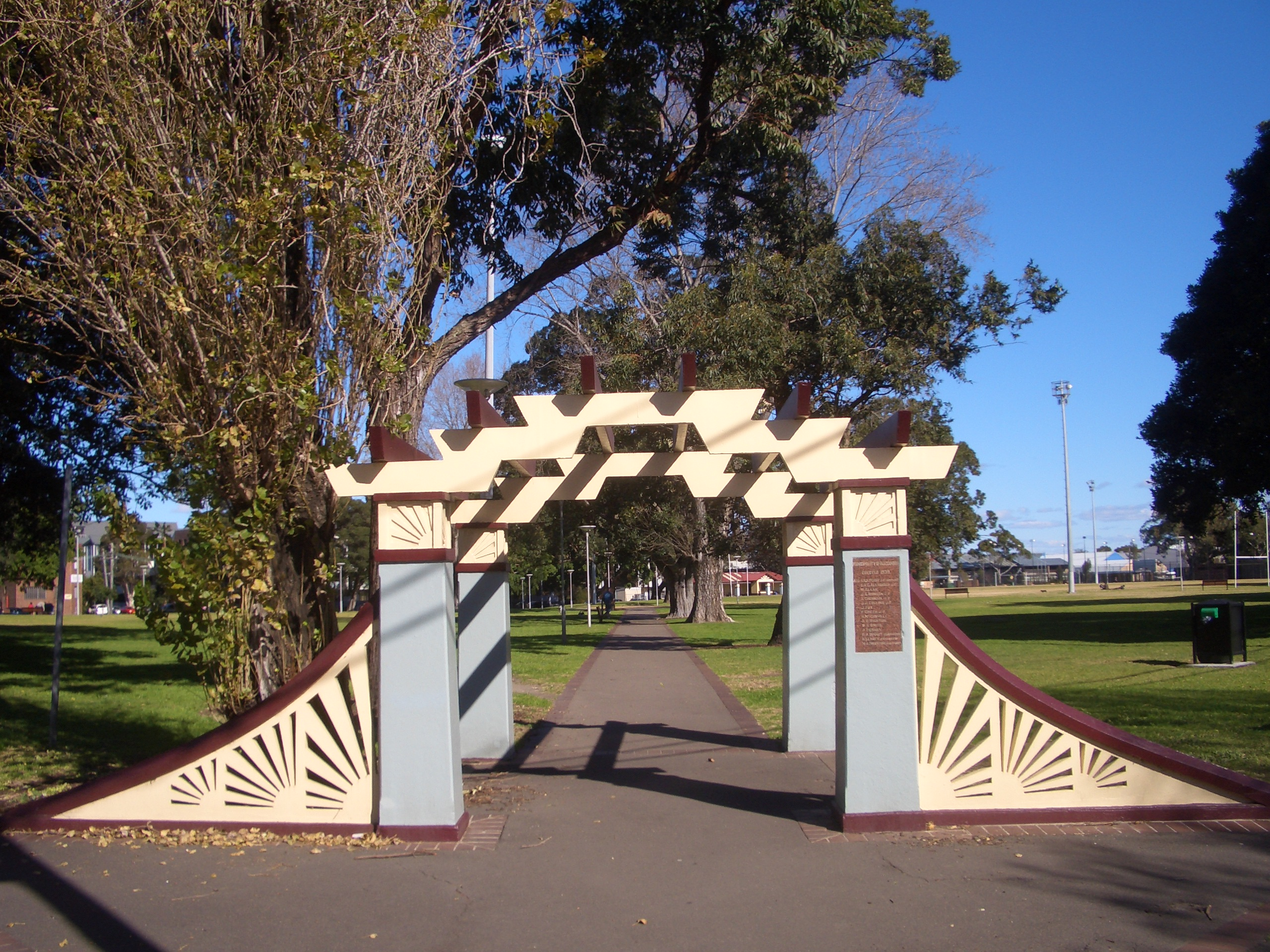
Alexandria Park, Wyndham Street

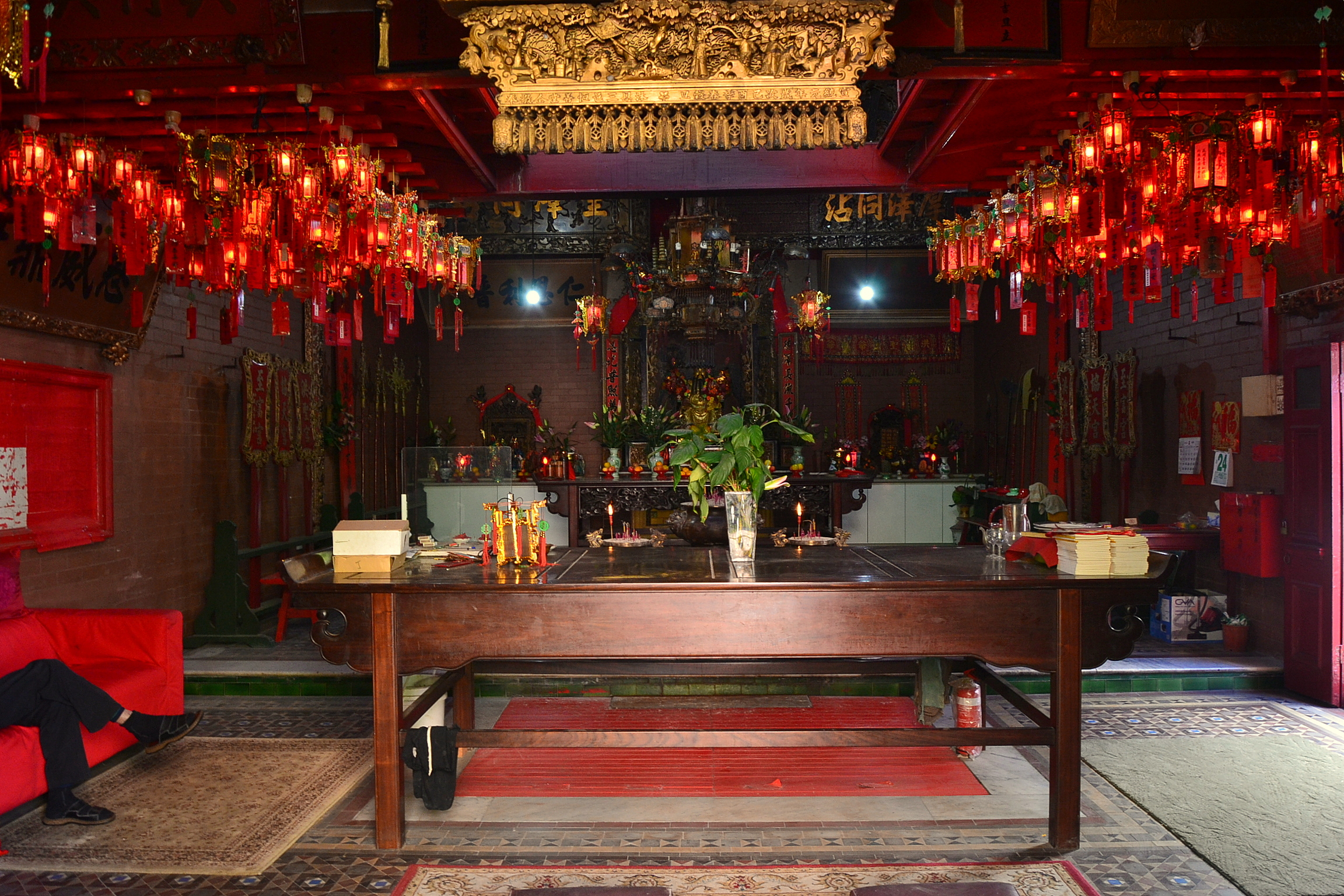
Yiu Ming Temple, Retreat Street

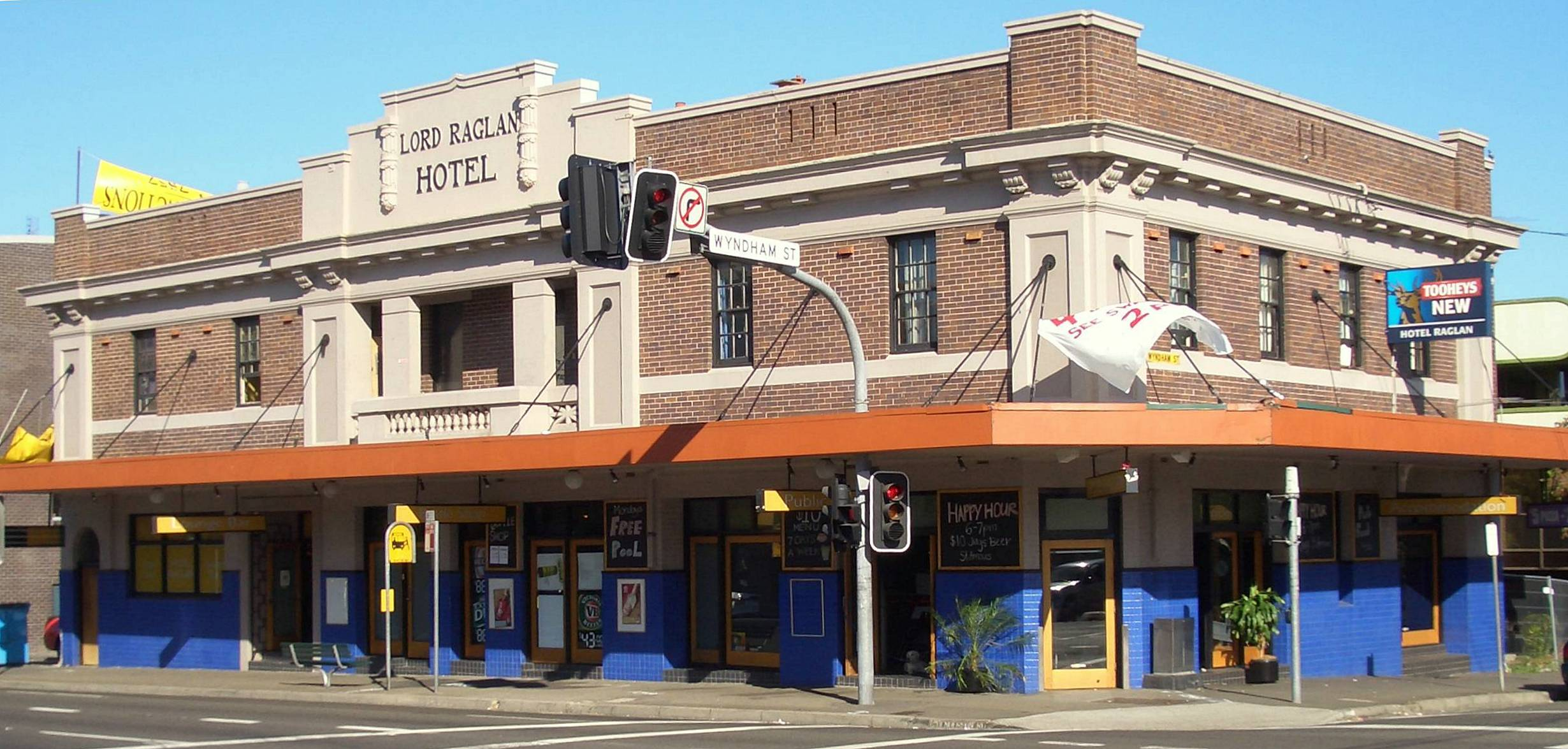
Lord Raglan Hotel, Henderson Road

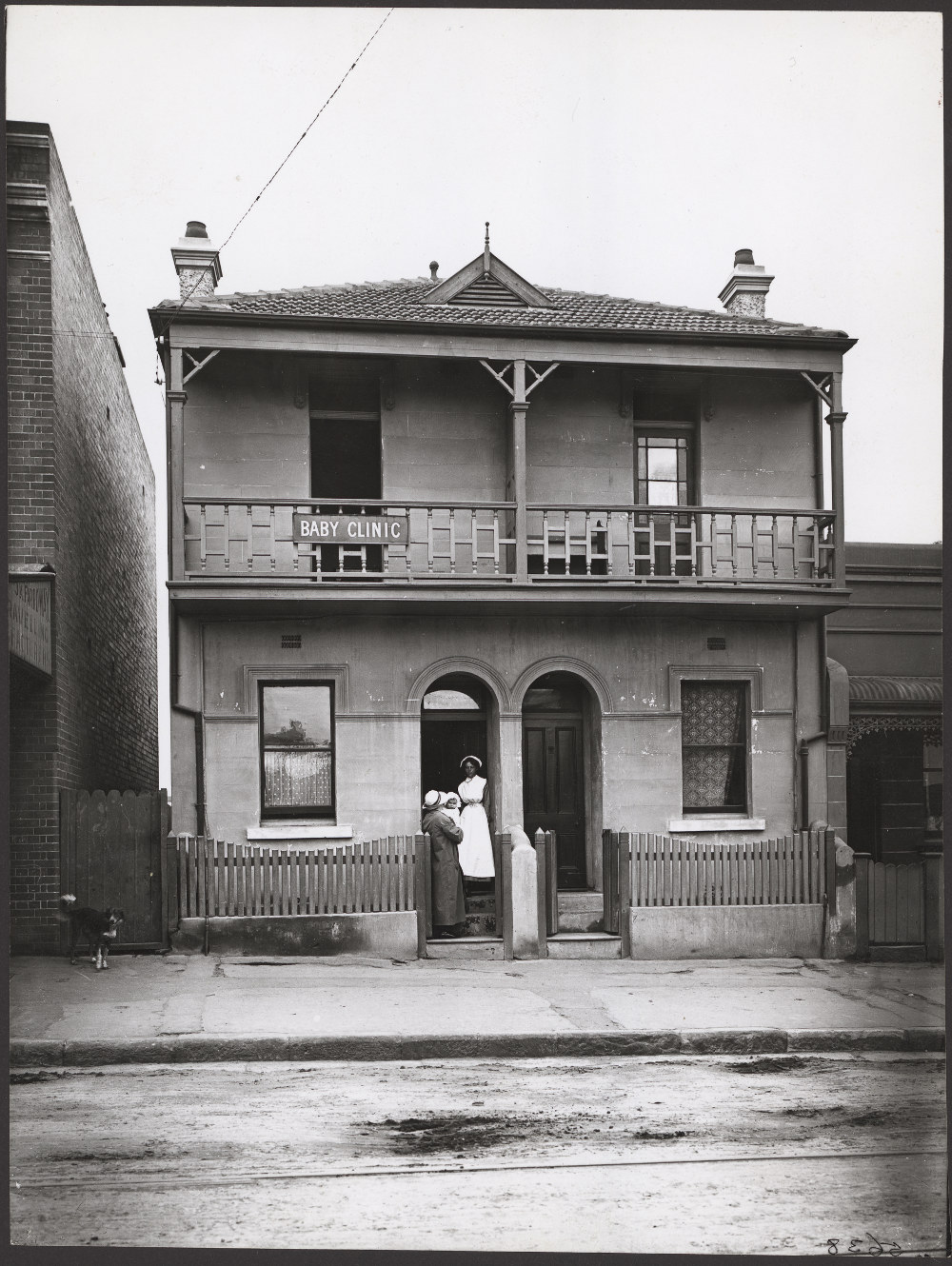
Former Alexandria Baby Clinic

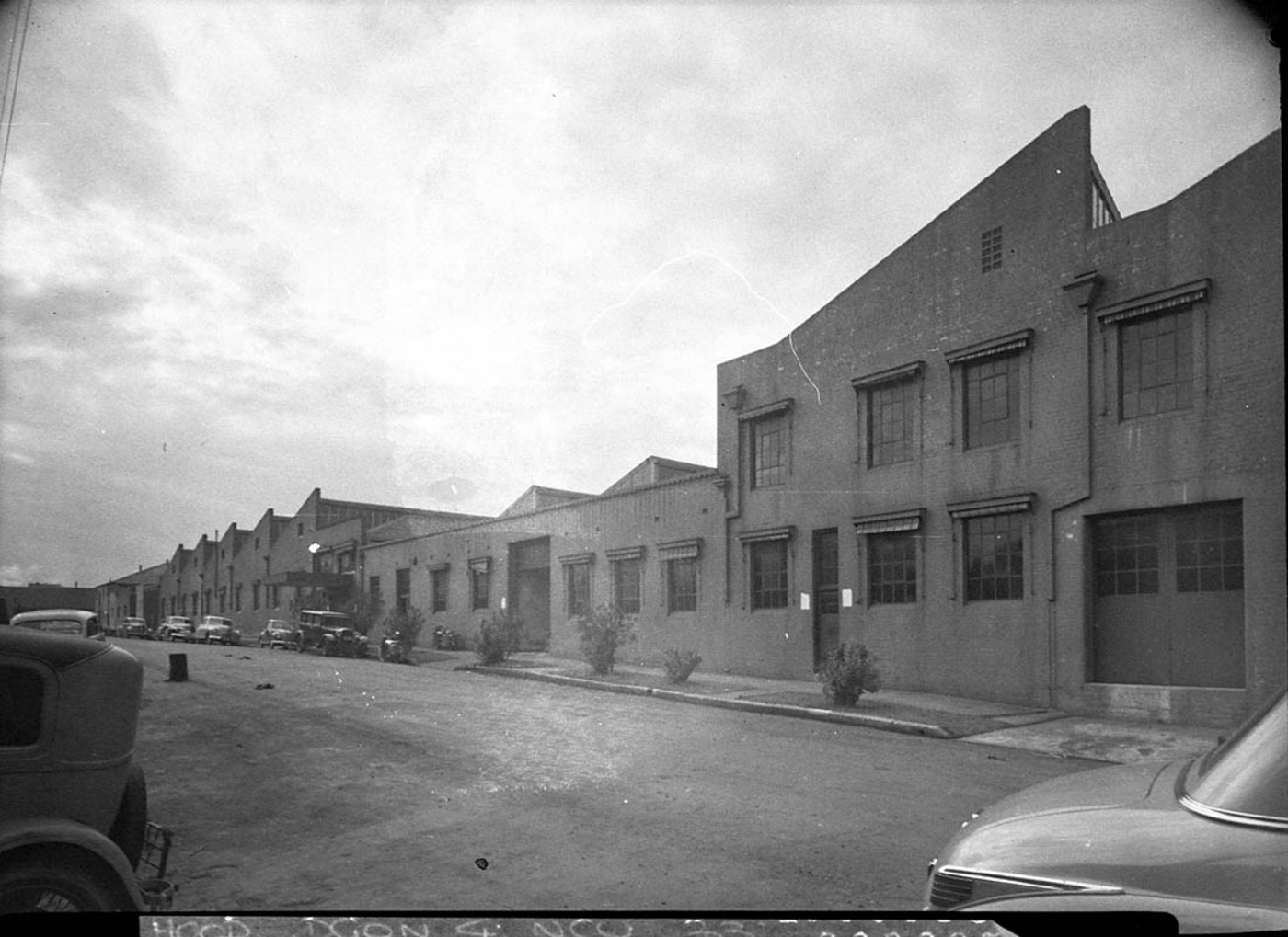
Bestex Mills, Alexandria on 17 July 1951
