= Royal Hospital for Sick Children =

The Royal Hospital for Sick Children may refer to:

- Bristol Royal Hospital for Children, Bristol hospital founded in 2001
- Royal Hospital for Sick Children, Edinburgh, Former Edinburgh Hospital founded in 1860
- Royal Hospital for Children, Glasgow, Glasgow hospital founded in 2015
- Royal Hospital for Children, Glasgow, Former Glasgow hospital founded in 1914
- Royal Hospital for Children and Young People, Edinburgh hospital founded in 2021

== See also ==
- List of children's hospitals
