= Royal Alexandra Hospital =

Royal Alexandra Hospital may refer to:

- Royal Alexandra Children's Hospital, Brighton, England
- Royal Alexandra Hospital (Edmonton), Canada
- Royal Alexandra Hospital for Children, Sydney, Australia
- Royal Alexandra Hospital, Paisley, Scotland
- Royal Alexandra Hospital, Rhyl, Wales

== See also ==
- RAF Princess Alexandra Hospital, Wroughton, England
