= Electoral results for the district of Botany =

Election results for Botany, New South Wales, Australia

Botany, an electoral district of the Legislative Assembly in the Australian state of New South Wales was created in 1894 and abolished in 1950.

Election	Member	Party								
1894	William Stephen	Ind. Free Trade								
1895	John Dacey	Labour								
1898	John Dacey	Labour								
1901	John Dacey	Labour								
1904	Rowland Anderson	Liberal Reform								
1907	Fred Page	Labour								
1910	Fred Page	Labour								
1913	Fred Page	Independent Labor								
1917	Thomas Mutch	Labor	Member	Party	Member	Party	Member	Party	Member	Party
1920	Thomas Mutch	Labor	Simon Hickey	Labor	Frank Burke	Labor	William McKell	Labor	John Lee	Nationalist
1922	Thomas Mutch	Labor	Bill Ratcliffe	Labor	Frank Burke	Labor	William McKell	Labor	John Lee	Nationalist
1925	Thomas Mutch	Labor	Bill Ratcliffe	Labor	Frank Burke	Labor	William McKell	Labor	John Lee	Nationalist
1927	Thomas Mutch	Independent Labor								
1930	Robert Heffron	Labor								
1932	Robert Heffron	Labor								
1935	Robert Heffron	Labor								
1938	Robert Heffron	Industrial Labor								
1941	Robert Heffron	Labor								
1944	Robert Heffron	Labor								
1947	Robert Heffron	Labor								

== Election results ==
=== Elections in the 1940s ===
==== 1947 ====
1947 New South Wales state election: Botany
Party	Candidate	Votes	%	±%
Labor	Bob Heffron	unopposed		
Labor hold				

==== 1944 ====
1944 New South Wales state election: Botany
Party	Candidate	Votes	%	±%
Labor	Bob Heffron	unopposed		
Labor hold				

==== 1941 ====
1941 New South Wales state election: Botany
Party	Candidate	Votes	%	±%
Labor	Bob Heffron	14,312	76.0	
Independent Labor	Addison Brittain	4,526	24.0	
Total formal votes		18,838	94.3	
Informal votes		1,129	5.7	
Turnout		19,967	92.3	
Member changed to Labor from Industrial Labor				

=== Elections in the 1930s ===
==== 1938 ====
1938 New South Wales state election: Botany
Party	Candidate	Votes	%	±%
Industrial Labor	Bob Heffron	13,865	60.3	
Labor	Francis Kelly	9,118	39.7	
Total formal votes		22,983	95.2	
Informal votes		1,150	4.8	
Turnout		24,133	96.8	
Member changed to Industrial Labor from Labor		Swing	N/A	

==== 1935 ====
1935 New South Wales state election: Botany
Party	Candidate	Votes	%	±%
Labor (NSW)	Bob Heffron	unopposed		
Labor (NSW) hold				

==== 1932 ====
1932 New South Wales state election: Botany
Party	Candidate	Votes	%	±%
Labor (NSW)	Bob Heffron	11,023	54.3	−9.2
United Australia	Trevor Levy	6,084	30.0	+30.0
Federal Labor	Frederick Kerr	3,013	14.8	+14.9
Communist	Basil Williams	175	0.9	0.0
Total formal votes		20,295	98.2	+0.6
Informal votes		361	1.8	−0.6
Turnout		20,656	96.8	+1.6
Labor (NSW) hold		Swing	N/A	

- Preferences were not distributed.

==== 1930 ====
1930 New South Wales state election: Botany
Party	Candidate	Votes	%	±%
Labor	Bob Heffron	12,230	63.5	
Independent Labor	Thomas Mutch (defeated)	6,862	35.6	
Communist	Frank Warner	167	0.9	
Total formal votes		19,259	97.6	
Informal votes		469	2.4	
Turnout		19,728	95.2	
Labor gain from Independent Labor		Swing		

Sitting member Thomas Mutch had been expelled from Labor in 1927, but had been re-elected as an Independent Labor candidate.

=== Elections in the 1920s ===
==== 1927 ====
1927 New South Wales state election: Botany
Party	Candidate	Votes	%	±%
Independent Labor	Thomas Mutch	6,281	51.0	
Labor	Bob Heffron	5,661	46.0	
Nationalist	Benjamin Blackburn	374	3.0	
Total formal votes		12,316	99.1	
Informal votes		114	0.9	
Turnout		12,430	88.7	
Independent Labor win		(new seat)		

==== 1925 ====
1925 New South Wales state election: Botany
Party	Candidate	Votes	%	±%
Quota		7,919		
Labor	Thomas Mutch (elected 1)	10,146	21.4	+6.4
Labor	William McKell (elected 3)	8,523	17.9	+4.1
Labor	Bill Ratcliffe (elected 4)	5,726	12.1	−0.9
Labor	William Long	4,284	9.0	+9.0
Labor	Frank Burke (elected 5)	4,017	8.5	−2.0
Nationalist	John Lee (elected 2)	10,098	21.2	+0.3
Nationalist	David Alexander	665	1.4	−1.6
Nationalist	William Herford	108	0.2	+0.2
Nationalist	James Sinclair	99	0.2	+0.2
Nationalist	Stephen Turner	46	0.1	+0.1
Independent Labor	Peter Gallagher	3,034	6.4	+6.4
Protestant Labour	Walter Bateman	370	0.8	+0.8
Communist	Henry Denford	147	0.3	+0.3
Communist	Nellie Rickie	111	0.2	+0.2
Independent	Arthur Strange-Mure	76	0.2	+0.2
Majority Labor	Carl Liebau	63	0.1	+0.1
Total formal votes		47,513	95.6	+0.6
Informal votes		2,210	4.4	−0.6
Turnout		49,723	69.2	+0.6
Party total votes
Labor		32,696	68.8	+7.0
Nationalist		11,016	23.2	−6.5
Independent Labor		3,034	6.4	+6.4
Protestant Labour		370	0.8	+0.8
Communist		258	0.5	+0.5
Independent	Arthur Strange-Mure	76	0.2	+0.2
Majority Labor		63	0.1	+0.1

==== 1922 ====
1922 New South Wales state election: Botany
Party	Candidate	Votes	%	±%
Labor	Thomas Mutch (elected 4)	6,733	15.0	−5.3
Labor	William McKell (elected 5)	6,176	13.8	−1.6
Labor	Bill Ratcliffe (elected 3)	5,816	13.0	+8.3
Labor	Frank Burke (elected 2)	4,722	10.5	−5.9
Labor	Simon Hickey (defeated)	4,239	9.5	−0.6
Nationalist	John Lee (elected 1)	9,365	20.9	+5.1
Nationalist	David Alexander	1,362	3.0	+3.0
Nationalist	William Pritchard	1,269	2.8	+2.8
Nationalist	William Wassall	756	1.7	+1.7
Nationalist	Albert Dunning	532	1.2	+1.2
Democratic	Daniel McGrath	3,041	6.8	+6.8
Independent	Fred Page	523	1.2	+1.2
Independent	George Overhill	117	0.3	+0.3
Industrial Labor	William Wallace	71	0.2	+0.2
Independent	Patrick Mulheron	63	0.1	+0.1
Total formal votes		44,785	95.0	+10.5
Informal votes		2,377	5.0	−10.5
Turnout		47,162	68.6	+16.8
Party total votes
Labor		27,686	61.8	−5.2
Nationalist		13,284	29.7	+9.9
Democratic		3,041	6.8	−0.8
Independent	Fred Page	523	1.2	+1.2
Independent	George Overhill	117	0.3	+0.3
Industrial Labor		71	0.2	+0.2
Independent	Patrick Mulheron	63	0.1	+0.1

==== 1920 ====
1920 New South Wales state election: Botany
Party	Candidate	Votes	%	±%
Quota		4,749		
Labor	Thomas Mutch (elected 1)	5,781	20.3	
Labor	Frank Burke (elected 2)	4,685	16.4	
Labor	William McKell (elected 3)	4,379	15.4	
Labor	Simon Hickey (elected 5)	2,883	10.1	
Labor	Bill Ratcliffe	1,351	4.7	
Nationalist	John Lee (elected 4)	4,499	15.8	
Nationalist	James Morrish	1,132	4.0	
Democratic	Edward Connell	2,179	7.7	
Progressive	Philip Strange-Mure	319	1.1	
Progressive	Charles Coghlan	183	0.6	
Socialist Labor	Annie Toohey	173	0.6	
Socialist Labor	Timothy McCristal	123	0.4	
Socialist Labor	Henry Denford	53	0.2	
Socialist Labor	John Jamieson	44	0.2	
Independent	Stanley McGowen	339	1.2	
Soldiers & Citizens	Charles Banks	255	0.9	
Soldiers & Citizens	Christopher Evers	60	0.2	
Independent	Patrick Quinn	33	0.1	
Independent	George Crowley	19	0.1	
Total formal votes		28,490	84.5	
Informal votes		5,215	15.5	
Turnout		33,705	51.8	
Party total votes
Labor		19,079	67.0	
Nationalist		5,631	19.8	
Democratic		2,179	7.7	
Progressive		502	1.8	
Socialist Labor		393	1.4	
Independent	Stanley McGowen	339	1.2	
Soldiers & Citizens		315	1.1	
Independent	Patrick Quinn	33	0.1	
Independent	George Crowley	19	0.1	

=== Elections in the 1910s ===
==== 1917 ====
1917 New South Wales state election: Botany
Party	Candidate	Votes	%	±%
Labor	Thomas Mutch	5,333	57.9	+18.1
Independent Labor	Fred Page	3,882	42.1	−18.1
Total formal votes		9,215	99.1	+1.3
Informal votes		80	0.9	−1.3
Turnout		9,295	63.2	−1.0
Labor gain from Independent Labor		Swing	+18.1	

==== 1913 ====
1913 New South Wales state election: Botany
Party	Candidate	Votes	%	±%
Independent Labor	Fred Page	4,559	60.2	
Labor	David Johnstone	3,019	39.8	
Total formal votes		7,578	97.8	
Informal votes		170	2.2	
Turnout		7,748	64.2	
Member changed to Independent Labor from Labor				

==== 1910 ====
1910 New South Wales state election: Botany
Party	Candidate	Votes	%	±%
Labour	Fred Page	4,547	64.0	
Liberal Reform	George Howe	2,558	36.0	
Total formal votes		7,105	98.9	
Informal votes		82	1.1	
Turnout		7,187	68.6	
Labour hold				

=== Elections in the 1900s ===
==== 1907 ====
1907 New South Wales state election: Botany
Party	Candidate	Votes	%	±%
Labour	Fred Page	3,420	53.2	+14.3
Liberal Reform	Isaac Spackman	2,958	46.0	+5.9
Independent	William Cox	55	0.9	
Total formal votes		6,433	96.8	
Informal votes		212	3.2	
Turnout		6,645	72.2	
Labour gain from Liberal Reform		Swing	+4.2	

==== 1904 ====
1904 New South Wales state election: Botany
Party	Candidate	Votes	%	±%
Liberal Reform	Rowland Anderson	2,224	40.1	
Labour	George Clark	2,154	38.8	
Independent	Isaac Spackman	945	17.0	
Progressive	Patrick Craddock	224	4.0	
Total formal votes		5,547	99.0	
Informal votes		57	1.0	
Turnout		5,604	67.1	
Liberal Reform gain from Labour				

Botany lost part of the district to Randwick and absorbed part of Newtown-St Peters. The member for Botany was John Dacey who, lost Labour pre-selection and successfully contested Alexandria instead. The member for Newtown-St Peters was James Fallick (Independent Liberal) who successfully contested Singleton as an official Liberal Reform candidate.

==== 1901 ====
1901 New South Wales state election: Botany
Party	Candidate	Votes	%	±%
Labour	John Dacey	1,236	54.6	+23.1
Liberal Reform	William Stephen	1,027	45.4	
Total formal votes		2,263	99.0	−
Informal votes		23	1.0	−
Turnout		2,286	73.3	+5.8
Labour hold				

=== Elections in the 1890s ===
==== 1898 ====
1898 New South Wales colonial election: Botany
Party	Candidate	Votes	%	±%
Labour	John Dacey	568	31.5	
Ind. Free Trade	William Stephen	521	28.9	
National Federal	Charles Swinbourne	465	25.8	
Independent Federalist	James Macfadyen	206	11.4	
Independent Federalist	William Wall	42	2.3	
Total formal votes		1,802	99.0	
Informal votes		19	1.0	
Turnout		1,821	67.5	
Labour hold				

==== 1895 ====
1895 New South Wales colonial election: Botany
Party	Candidate	Votes	%	±%
Labour	John Dacey	610	43.4	
Free Trade	William Stephen	607	43.1	
Ind. Free Trade	James Macfadyen	190	13.5	
Total formal votes		1,407	99.0	
Informal votes		14	1.0	
Turnout		1,421	71.0	
Labour gain from Ind. Free Trade				

==== 1894 ====
1894 New South Wales colonial election: Botany
Party	Candidate	Votes	%	±%
Ind. Free Trade	William Stephen	632	37.9	
Labour	John Dacey	611	36.6	
Ind. Free Trade	James Macfadyen	295	17.7	
Protectionist	Francis Luland	130	7.8	
Total formal votes		1,668	98.5	
Informal votes		26	1.5	
Turnout		1,694	83.4	
Ind. Free Trade win		(new seat)		
