= Electoral results for the district of Alexandria =

Election results for Alexandria, New South Wales, Australia

Alexandria, an electoral district of the Legislative Assembly in the Australian state of New South Wales, had two incarnations, the first from 1904 to 1920, the second from 1927 to 1930.

First incarnation (1904–1920)
Election	Member	Party
1904	John Dacey	Labor
1907	John Dacey	Labor
1910	John Dacey	Labor
1912 by	Simon Hickey	Labor
1913	Simon Hickey	Labor
1917	Simon Hickey	Labor
Second incarnation (1927–1930)
1927	Bill Ratcliffe	Labor

== Election results ==
=== Elections in the 1920s ===
==== 1927 ====
1927 New South Wales state election: Alexandria
Party	Candidate	Votes	%	±%
Labor	Bill Ratcliffe	8,370	67.6	
Nationalist	Ernest Kidd	4,018	32.4	
Total formal votes		12,388	98.8	
Informal votes		150	1.2	
Turnout		12,538	82.7	
Labor win		(new seat)		

Bill Ratcliffe was one of five sitting MPs for Botany.

District recreated

==== 1920 - 1927 ====
District abolished

=== Elections in the 1910s ===
==== 1917 ====
1917 New South Wales state election: Alexandria
Party	Candidate	Votes	%	±%
Labor	Simon Hickey	3,670	69.9	−0.1
Nationalist	Sydney Smith	1,388	26.4	+26.4
Independent	James Dixon	189	3.6	−16.6
Total formal votes		5,247	99.1	+1.9
Informal votes		50	0.9	−1.9
Turnout		5,297	53.9	−0.4
Labor hold		Swing	−0.1	

Sitting Labor MP Simon Hickey was returned with a slightly reduced majority. Sydney Smith was a former member for East Macquarie, Bathurst, Canterbury and federal member for Macquarie.

==== 1913 ====
1913 New South Wales state election: Alexandria
Party	Candidate	Votes	%	±%
Labor	Simon Hickey	3,785	70.0	
Independent Liberal	James Dixon	1,092	20.2	
Independent	Joseph Warner	529	9.8	
Total formal votes		5,406	97.2	
Informal votes		158	2.8	
Turnout		5,564	54.3	
Labor hold				

Sitting Labor MP Simon Hickey was returned with an increased majority.

==== 1912 by-election ====
1912 Alexandria by-election Saturday 18 May
Party	Candidate	Votes	%	±%
Labour	Simon Hickey	3,437	65.4	−3.3
Liberal Reform	William Ferguson	1,695	32.2	+1.3
Socialist	Arthur Duffield	70	1.3	
Independent	James Dixon	56	1.1	
Total formal votes		5,258	97.3	+0.2
Informal votes		147	2.7	−0.2
Turnout		5,405	55.6 (Note: estimate based on an electoral roll of 9,721 at the 1910 election.)	−9.5
Labour hold		Swing		

The by-election was caused by the death of John Dacey. Simon Hickey was Dacey's son-in-law. William Ferguson was a former member for Sturt who had been a member of Labor until switching to Liberal reform in 1904.

=== Elections in the 1900s ===
==== 1910 ====
1910 New South Wales state election: Alexandria
Party	Candidate	Votes	%	±%
Labour	John Dacey	4,225	68.7	+13.7
Liberal Reform	George Smith	1,897	30.9	−11.9
Independent	James Horne	25	0.4	
Total formal votes		6,147	97.1	−0.6
Informal votes		186	2.9	+0.6
Turnout		6,333	65.2	−6.6
Labour hold		Swing	+13.7	

Sitting Labor MP John Dacey was returned with an increased majority.

==== 1907 ====
1907 New South Wales state election: Alexandria
Party	Candidate	Votes	%	±%
Labour	John Dacey	3,523	55.0	
Liberal Reform	Albert Bruntnell	2,742	42.8	
Independent	Joseph Edward Warner	119	1.9	
Independent	Patrick Joseph Craddock	10	0.2	
Independent	Alexander Bryson	8	0.1	
Total formal votes		6,290	97.7	
Informal votes		147	2.3	
Turnout		6,437	71.7	
Labour hold				

Albert Bruntnell had been elected MP for Surry Hills at the 1906 by-election.

==== 1904 ====
1904 New South Wales state election: Alexandria
Party	Candidate	Votes	%	±%
Labour	John Dacey	2,859	49.8	
Progressive	George Anderson	2,742	47.8	
Independent	Thomas Edwards	90	1.6	
Socialist Labor	John Wilcox	49	0.9	
Total formal votes		5,740	99.4	
Informal votes		36	0.6	
Turnout		5,776	64.2	
Labour win		(new seat)		

Alexandria was a new seat, comprising parts of the seat of Botany and the abolished seats of Darlington, Newtown-Erskine and Waterloo. John Dacey was the member for Botany who had lost Labour pre-selection for that seat, while George Anderson was the member for the abolished seat of Waterloo. The member for Darlington was Phillip Sullivan (Labour) who successfully contested Phillip while the member for Newtown-Erskine was Robert Hollis (Labour) who successfully contested Newtown.
