= Electoral results for the district of Heffron =

Election results for Heffron, New South Wales, Australia

Heffron, an electoral district of the Legislative Assembly in the Australian state of New South Wales, was created in 1973 and has always been held by the Labor party.

== Members for Heffron ==
Election	Member	Party
1973	Laurie Brereton	Labor
1976	Laurie Brereton	Labor
1978	Laurie Brereton	Labor
1981	Laurie Brereton	Labor
1984	Laurie Brereton	Labor
1988	Laurie Brereton	Labor
1990 by	Deirdre Grusovin	Labor
1991	Deirdre Grusovin	Labor
1995	Deirdre Grusovin	Labor
1999	Deirdre Grusovin	Labor
2003	Kristina Keneally	Labor
2007	Kristina Keneally	Labor
2011	Kristina Keneally	Labor
2012 by	Ron Hoenig	Labor
2015	Ron Hoenig	Labor
2019	Ron Hoenig	Labor
2023	Ron Hoenig	Labor

== Election results ==
=== Elections in the 2020s ===
==== 2023 ====
2023 New South Wales state election: Heffron
Party	Candidate	Votes	%	±%
Labor	Ron Hoenig	22,458	49.7	+7.4
Liberal	Francis Devine	9,597	21.2	−6.5
Greens	Philipa Veitch	8,559	18.9	+1.1
Independent	Sarina Kilham	1,538	3.4	+3.4
Animal Justice	Linda Paull	1,252	2.8	−0.5
Sustainable Australia	Ann Godfrey	889	2.0	+2.0
Socialist Alliance	Rachel Evans	878	1.9	+1.9
Total formal votes		45,171	97.1	−0.2
Informal votes		1,328	2.9	+0.2
Turnout		46,499	82.6	−0.7
Two-party-preferred result
Labor	Ron Hoenig	29,757	73.3	+8.0
Liberal	Francis Devine	10,847	26.7	−8.0
Labor hold		Swing	+8.0	

=== Elections in the 2010s ===
==== 2019 ====
2019 New South Wales state election: Heffron
Party	Candidate	Votes	%	±%
Labor	Ron Hoenig	20,409	40.81	−3.49
Liberal	Alexander Andruska	13,863	27.72	−1.99
Greens	Kym Chapple	9,565	19.13	−1.98
Keep Sydney Open	Chris Ryan	4,575	9.15	+9.15
Animal Justice	Michael Dello-Iacovo	1,598	3.20	+3.20
Total formal votes		50,010	97.48	+0.73
Informal votes		1,292	2.52	−0.73
Turnout		51,302	84.69	−2.49
Two-party-preferred result
Labor	Ron Hoenig	28,874	65.13	+1.03
Liberal	Alexander Andruska	15,462	34.87	−1.03
Labor hold		Swing	+1.03	

==== 2015 ====
2015 New South Wales state election: Heffron
Party	Candidate	Votes	%	±%
Labor	Ron Hoenig	20,539	44.3	+4.4
Liberal	John Koutsoukis	13,775	29.7	−5.1
Greens	Osman Faruqi	9,788	21.1	+3.5
No Land Tax	Anastasia Bakss	1,392	3.0	+3.0
Christian Democrats	Shawn Arbeau	873	1.9	−0.0
Total formal votes		46,367	96.7	+0.5
Informal votes		1,558	3.3	−0.5
Turnout		47,925	87.2	+3.7
Two-party-preferred result
Labor	Ron Hoenig	26,529	64.1	+8.9
Liberal	John Koutsoukis	14,860	35.9	−8.9
Labor hold		Swing	+8.9	

==== 2012 by-election ====
2012 Heffron by-election
Party	Candidate	Votes	%	±%
Labor	Ron Hoenig	20,501	58.9	+17.7
Greens	Mehreen Faruqi	8,122	23.3	+4.4
Democrats	Drew Simmons	3,749	10.8	+10.8
Christian Democrats	Robyn Peebles	2,442	7.0	+5.1
Total formal votes		34,814	94.8	–1.9
Informal votes		1,910	5.2	+1.9
Turnout		36,724	65.9	–22.8
Two-candidate-preferred result
Labor	Ron Hoenig	21,863	70.0	+12.9
Greens	Mehreen Faruqi	9,366	30.0	+30.0
Labor hold		Swing	N/A	

Kristina Keneally (Labor) resigned.

==== 2011 ====
2011 New South Wales state election: Heffron
Party	Candidate	Votes	%	±%
Labor	Kristina Keneally	18,870	41.2	−15.2
Liberal	Patrice Pandeleos	15,226	33.3	+11.5
Greens	Mehreen Faruqi	8,681	19.0	−0.7
Independent	John Forster	1,865	4.1	+4.1
Christian Democrats	Katalin Ferrier	871	1.9	+1.9
	Trevor Rowe	254	0.6	+0.6
Total formal votes		45,767	96.7	+0.4
Informal votes		1,548	3.3	−0.4
Turnout		47,315	88.7	
Two-party-preferred result
Labor	Kristina Keneally	22,299	57.1	−16.6
Liberal	Patrice Pandeleos	16,780	42.9	+16.6
Labor hold		Swing	−16.6	

=== Elections in the 2000s ===
==== 2007 ====
2007 New South Wales state election: Heffron
Party	Candidate	Votes	%	±%
Labor	Kristina Keneally	23,066	56.4	+2.0
Liberal	Scott Nash	8,889	21.8	+4.0
Greens	Ben Spies-Butcher	8,031	19.7	+6.9
	James Cogan	875	2.1	+2.1
Total formal votes		40,861	96.3	
Informal votes		1,549	3.7	
Turnout		42,410	89.3	
Two-party-preferred result
Labor	Kristina Keneally	27,371	73.7	−0.5
Liberal	Scott Nash	9,783	26.3	+0.5
Labor hold		Swing	−0.5	

==== 2003 ====
2003 New South Wales state election: Heffron
Party	Candidate	Votes	%	±%
Labor	Kristina Keneally	21,780	57.4	−6.0
Liberal	Sarah Lawrance	7,061	18.6	−0.8
Greens	Will Smith	4,837	12.7	+7.3
Independent	Margery Whitehead	1,605	4.2	+4.2
Independent	John Bush	919	2.4	+2.4
Unity	Alan Lai	808	2.1	+2.1
Independent	John Tullis	488	1.3	+1.3
Democrats	Stephen Chanphakeo	456	1.2	−2.8
Total formal votes		37,954	96.2	
Informal votes		1,486	3.8	
Turnout		39,440	89.8	
Two-party-preferred result
Labor	Kristina Keneally	24,332	73.9	−2.2
Liberal	Sarah Lawrance	8,603	26.1	+2.2
Labor hold		Swing	−2.2	

=== Elections in the 1990s ===
==== 1999 ====
1999 New South Wales state election: Heffron
Party	Candidate	Votes	%	±%
Labor	Deirdre Grusovin	23,492	63.4	+4.1
Liberal	Jackie Canessa	7,205	19.4	−6.6
Greens	Jonathan Keyte	1,992	5.4	−2.7
One Nation	David Taylor	1,615	4.4	+4.4
Democrats	David Mendelssohn	1,476	4.0	+3.0
AAFI	Rex Dobson	952	2.6	+2.6
Democratic Socialist	Jim Green	338	0.9	+0.6
Total formal votes		37,070	96.3	+2.9
Informal votes		1,440	3.7	−2.9
Turnout		38,510	91.3	
Two-party-preferred result
Labor	Deirdre Grusovin	25,478	76.1	+6.3
Liberal	Jackie Canessa	7,998	23.9	−6.3
Labor hold		Swing	+6.3	

==== 1995 ====
1995 New South Wales state election: Heffron
Party	Candidate	Votes	%	±%
Labor	Deirdre Grusovin	20,611	61.5	+3.4
Liberal	Ben Franklin	9,435	28.1	−2.2
Greens	Mark Berriman	3,105	9.3	+1.8
Socialist Labour	Yabu Bilyana	370	1.1	+1.1
Total formal votes		33,521	92.9	+8.9
Informal votes		2,577	7.1	−8.9
Turnout		36,098	91.9	
Two-party-preferred result
Labor	Deirdre Grusovin	22,194	68.8	+3.1
Liberal	Ben Franklin	10,071	31.2	−3.1
Labor hold		Swing	+3.1	

==== 1991 ====
1991 New South Wales state election: Heffron
Party	Candidate	Votes	%	±%
Labor	Deirdre Grusovin	17,100	58.0	+1.8
Liberal	John Paterson	8,928	30.3	−1.8
Greens	Mark Berriman	2,208	7.5	+7.5
Democrats	Eamon Quinn	1,227	4.2	+3.4
Total formal votes		29,463	84.0	−11.5
Informal votes		5,623	16.0	+11.5
Turnout		35,086	93.0	
Two-party-preferred result
Labor	Deirdre Grusovin	18,102	65.7	+4.2
Liberal	John Paterson	9,463	34.3	−4.2
Labor hold		Swing	+4.2	

==== 1990 by-election ====
1990 Heffron by-election Saturday 23 June
Party	Candidate	Votes	%	±%
Labor	Deirdre Grusovin	14,393	65.6	9.4
Democrats	Amelia Newman	3,549	16.2	
Greens	Mark Berriman	2,799	12.8	
Call to Australia	Beville Varidel	1,188	5.4	
Total formal votes		21,929	95.6	
Informal votes		999	4.4	
Turnout		22,928	72.0	
Two-candidate-preferred result
Labor	Deirdre Grusovin	15,206	74.2	15.0
Democrats	Amelia Newman	5,278	25.8	
Labor hold		Swing	15.0 (Note: compared to the two-party-preferred result for the 1988 Heffron election.)	

Laurie Brereton (Labor) resigned.

=== Elections in the 1980s ===
==== 1988 ====
1988 New South Wales state election: Heffron
Party	Candidate	Votes	%	±%
Labor	Laurie Brereton	15,759	56.2	−9.4
Liberal	Bernadette Hamilton	9,924	35.4	+0.9
Independent	Barry Devine	2,377	8.5	+8.5
Total formal votes		28,060	95.4	−0.8
Informal votes		1,366	4.6	+0.8
Turnout		29,426	91.5	
Two-party-preferred result
Labor	Laurie Brereton	16,109	59.2	−6.4
Liberal	Bernadette Hamilton	11,119	40.8	+6.4
Labor hold		Swing	−6.4	

==== 1984 ====
1984 New South Wales state election: Heffron
Party	Candidate	Votes	%	±%
Labor	Laurie Brereton	18,536	65.6	−11.9
Liberal	Barry Devine	9,730	34.4	+11.9
Total formal votes		28,266	96.1	+1.3
Informal votes		1,137	3.9	−1.3
Turnout		29,403	92.3	+2.3
Labor hold		Swing	−11.9	

==== 1981 ====
1981 New South Wales state election: Heffron
Party	Candidate	Votes	%	±%
Labor	Laurie Brereton	20,938	77.5	−2.5
Liberal	Carolyn O'Connor	6,094	22.5	+2.5
Total formal votes		27,032	94.8	
Informal votes		1,470	5.2	
Turnout		28,502	90.0	
Labor hold		Swing	−2.5	

=== Elections in the 1970s ===
==== 1978 ====
1978 New South Wales state election: Heffron
Party	Candidate	Votes	%	±%
Labor	Laurie Brereton	23,531	80.0	+16.9
Liberal	George Balos	5,871	20.0	−9.2
Total formal votes		29,402	95.8	−1.7
Informal votes		1,281	4.2	+1.7
Turnout		30,683	91.9	+1.8
Labor hold		Swing	+10.2	

==== 1976 ====
1976 New South Wales state election: Heffron
Party	Candidate	Votes	%	±%
Labor	Laurie Brereton	18,994	63.1	−4.9
Liberal	George Balos	8,794	29.2	+29.2
Independent	Crena Morrison	1,315	4.4	+4.4
Independent	John Holt	1,016	3.4	+3.4
Total formal votes		30,119	97.5	+2.7
Informal votes		769	2.5	−2.7
Turnout		30,888	90.1	+0.5
Two-party-preferred result
Labor	Laurie Brereton	21,031	69.8	−4.1
Liberal	George Balos	9,088	30.2	+30.2
Labor hold		Swing	−4.1	

==== 1973 ====
1973 New South Wales state election: Heffron
Party	Candidate	Votes	%	±%
Labor	Laurie Brereton	18,753	68.0	+1.9
Democratic Labor	Paul Evans	5,596	20.3	+20.3
Australia	Peter Clark	3,233	11.7	+11.7
Total formal votes		27,582	94.8	
Informal votes		1,525	5.2	
Turnout		29,107	89.6	
Two-candidate-preferred result
Labor	Laurie Brereton	20,369	73.8	+7.7
Democratic Labor	Paul Evans	7,213	26.2	+26.2
Labor notional hold		Swing	+7.7	

Heffron was a new seat with a notional Labor majority.
