= Ben Keneally =

Australian politician

Mayor of Botany Bay
- In office 8 September 2012 – 9 September 2016
- Deputy: George Glinatsis; Stan Kondilios
- Preceded by: Ron Hoenig
- Succeeded by: Council abolished

Spouse of the Premier of New South Wales
- In role 4 December 2009 – 28 March 2011
- Preceded by: Stacey Rees
- Succeeded by: Rosemary O’Farrell

Personal details
- Party: Labor
- Spouse: Kristina Keneally
- Children: 3 (1 deceased)
- Education: University of Sydney

Ben Keneally is an Australian management consultant and politician. He was the Mayor of Botany Bay from 2012 to 2016. His wife is the former NSW Premier and former Senator Kristina Keneally.

== Early life and career ==
Keneally grew up in Gladesville, New South Wales. Educated at Holy Cross College, Ryde and the University of Sydney. Keneally worked in the Boston Consulting Group from 1994 to 2003, then as a management consultant for Medical Imaging Australia Limited (MIA). He then worked as executive director at NSW Department of Housing, and then as Premier Morris Iemma's deputy chief of staff. He then worked for an environmental consultancy before entering politics.

Keneally was originally planning to challenge Deirdre Grusovin for Labor preselection in the state seat of Heffron in 2003. However, Labor's affirmative action rules required a female candidate, so he stood down in favour of his wife Kristina.

Keneally was the Labor candidate for City of Botany Bay's mayoral election during the 2012 local government elections, and was elected as Mayor. Later while he was Mayor, Keneally also began to work as a chief executive of a health care company. In December 2015, he delegated his mayoral duties to deputy mayor Stan Kondilio due to his increased workload at the health care company. He officially continued as Mayor until the council was dissolved and amalgamated to form Bayside Council in September 2016.

In January 2017, Keneally returned to the Boston Consulting Group to be a managing director and partner at its Sydney office. He still holds these positions as of March 2023. Keneally is the Asia-Pacific Healthcare lead for BCG.

== Personal life ==
Keneally met his future wife Kristina at World Youth Day 1991 in Poland. She moved to Australia in 1994 to be with him, but they returned to the US so Ben could take up a position with the Boston Consulting Group. They married there in 1996. They returned to Australia two years later, after their son was born.

The couple has two sons. A daughter died at birth.

Keneally is the nephew of Australian author Thomas Keneally.

Civic offices
Preceded by Ron Hoenig	Mayor of Botany Bay; 2012–2016	Council abolished
