= 2012 Heffron state by-election =

Election result for Heffron, New South Wales, Australia

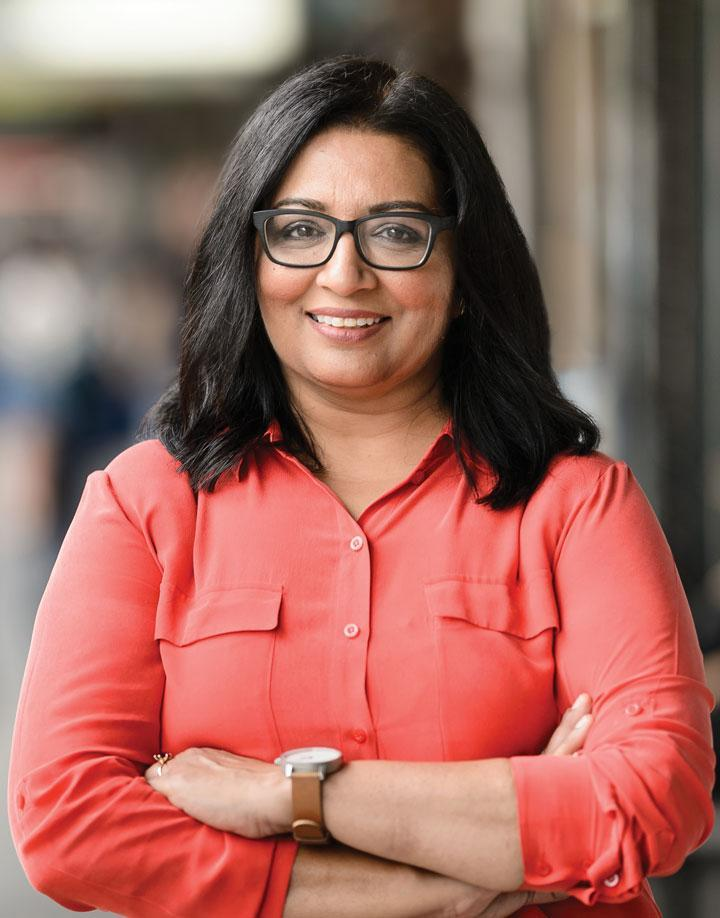
	First party	Second party	Third party
			DEM
Candidate	Ron Hoenig	Mehreen Faruqi	Drew Simmons
Party	Labor	Greens	Democrats
Popular vote	20,051	8,122	3,749
Percentage	58.9%	23.3%	10.8%
Swing	▲17.7	▲4.4	▲10.8
TPP	70.0%	30.0%
TPP swing	▲12.9	▲30.0
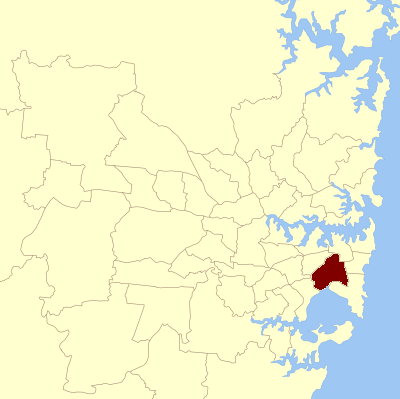
- The location of the seat of Heffron within Sydney
MP before election
Kristina Keneally
Labor
Elected MP
Ron Hoenig
Labor

A by-election occurred for the New South Wales Legislative Assembly seat of Heffron on Saturday 25 August 2012. This was triggered by the resignation of former Premier of New South Wales Kristina Keneally (Labor) which she announced on 23 June 2012. Labor easily retained the seat with an increased margin. Ron Hoenig received a 60 percent primary and 70 percent two-candidate preferred vote.

The by-election was held on the same day as the Northern Territory election.

== Dates ==
Date	Event
23 July 2012	Writ of election issued by the Speaker of the Legislative Assembly.
23 July 2012	Close of electoral rolls
8 August 2012	Close of party nominations
9 August 2012	Close of independent nominations, ballot paper order draw conducted
13 August 2012	Early voting began
25 August 2012	Polling day, between the hours of 8 am and 6 pm

== Background ==
Labor retained the seat of Heffron at the election in March 2011 with a primary vote of 41.2 percent and a two-party-preferred vote of 57.1 percent – the sixth-safest of Labor's 20 seats won at the election of the 93 seats in the Legislative Assembly. The Liberals won 33.3 percent of the primary vote in Heffron, the Greens won 19.0 percent, the CDP won 1.9 percent, with the remaining 4.6 percent to two independent candidates. There was a 16.3 percent two-party-preferred swing away from the Liberal/National Coalition government at the November 2011 Clarence by-election. The Liberals did not contest the Heffron by-election.

== Previous results ==
2011 New South Wales state election: Heffron
Party	Candidate	Votes	%	±%
Labor	Kristina Keneally	18,870	41.2	−15.2
Liberal	Patrice Pandeleos	15,226	33.3	+11.5
Greens	Mehreen Faruqi	8,681	19.0	−0.7
Independent	John Forster	1,865	4.1	+4.1
Christian Democrats	Katalin Ferrier	871	1.9	+1.9
	Trevor Rowe	254	0.6	+0.6
Total formal votes		45,767	96.7	+0.4
Informal votes		1,548	3.3	−0.4
Turnout		47,315	88.7	
Two-party-preferred result
Labor	Kristina Keneally	22,299	57.1	−16.6
Liberal	Patrice Pandeleos	16,780	42.9	+16.6
Labor hold		Swing	−16.6	

== Candidates ==
The four candidates in ballot paper order were as follows:

Candidate nominations
Labor Party	Ron Hoenig	Longest-serving Botany Bay Mayor.
Christian Democratic Party	Robyn Peebles	Pastor of West Ryde Church of the Good Shepherd, state and federal serial candidate.
Australian Greens	Mehreen Faruqi	Civil/environmental engineer and sustainability expert, contested Heffron at previous election.
Australian Democrats	Drew Simmons	Journalist and various positions in retail/management.

== Results ==
2012 Heffron by-election
Party	Candidate	Votes	%	±%
Labor	Ron Hoenig	20,501	58.9	+17.7
Greens	Mehreen Faruqi	8,122	23.3	+4.4
Democrats	Drew Simmons	3,749	10.8	+10.8
Christian Democrats	Robyn Peebles	2,442	7.0	+5.1
Total formal votes		34,814	94.8	–1.9
Informal votes		1,910	5.2	+1.9
Turnout		36,724	65.9	–22.8
Two-candidate-preferred result
Labor	Ron Hoenig	21,863	70.0	+12.9
Greens	Mehreen Faruqi	9,366	30.0	+30.0
Labor hold		Swing	N/A	

== See also ==
- Electoral results for the district of Heffron
- List of New South Wales state by-elections
