= 1990 Heffron state by-election =

Election result for Heffron, New South Wales, Australia

A by-election was held for the New South Wales Legislative Assembly electorate of Heffron on 23 June 1990 because of the resignation of Laurie Brereton (Labor) to successfully contest the 1990 federal election for Kingsford Smith The Labor candidate for the election was Deirdre Grusovin, the sister of Brereton.

The Heffron by-election was held the same day as the Granville and Smithfield by-elections.

== Dates ==
Date	Event
17 February 1990	Resignation of Laurie Brereton.
24 March 1990	1990 federal election
25 May 1990	Writ of election issued by the Speaker of the Legislative Assembly and close of electoral rolls.
1 June 1990	Nominations
23 June 1990	Polling day
13 July 1990	Return of writ

== Results ==
1990 Heffron by-election Saturday 23 June
Party	Candidate	Votes	%	±%
Labor	Deirdre Grusovin	14,393	65.6	9.4
Democrats	Amelia Newman	3,549	16.2	
Greens	Mark Berriman	2,799	12.8	
Call to Australia	Beville Varidel	1,188	5.4	
Total formal votes		21,929	95.6	
Informal votes		999	4.4	
Turnout		22,928	72.0	
Two-candidate-preferred result
Labor	Deirdre Grusovin	15,206	74.2	15.0
Democrats	Amelia Newman	5,278	25.8	
Labor hold		Swing	15.0 (Note: compared to the two-party-preferred result for the 1988 Heffron election.)	

== See also ==
- Electoral results for the district of Heffron
- List of New South Wales state by-elections
