= Mayor of Alexandria =

Mayor of Alexandria may refer to

- Mayor of Alexandria, New South Wales, Australia
- Mayor of Alexandria, Virginia, United States of America

== See also ==
- Governor of Alexandria, Egypt
