= List of mayors of Botany and Botany Bay =

People who served as the mayor of the Municipality of Botany and the City of Botany Bay are:

Seal of the Municipality of Botany, from 1938 Jubilee History, depicts the landing of Captain James Cook at Botany Bay in 1770. The Latin motto, Sicut Patribus Sit Deus Nobis, translates to "God be with us as He was with our fathers".

Mayor	Party	Term	Notes
James John Macfadyen	Independent	20 August 1888 – 13 February 1890	
John E. Chant	Independent	13 February 1890 – 14 February 1891	
Charles R. Swinbourne	Independent	14 February 1891 – 10 February 1893	
Francis John Luland	Independent	10 February 1893 – 14 February 1895	
James John Macfadyen	Independent	14 February 1895 – 13 February 1896	
Joseph Pemberton	Independent	13 February 1896 – 9 February 1897	
Joshua Wiggins	Independent	9 February 1897 – 8 February 1898	
Francis Hambly	Independent	8 February 1898 – 10 February 1900	
Oscar William Nilson	Independent	10 February 1900 – 16 February 1901	
William Stephen	Independent	16 February 1901 – 10 February 1902	
Frederick Page	Independent	10 February 1902 – 12 February 1903	
Francis John Luland	Independent	12 February 1903 – 20 February 1905	
Clement Frederick Etherden	Independent	20 February 1905 – February 1909	
Frederick Anderson	Independent	February 1909 – 11 February 1910	
John Herford	Independent	11 February 1910 – 9 February 1911	
William Hale	Independent	9 February 1911 – 12 February 1913	
Oscar William Nilson	Independent	12 February 1913 – 10 February 1914	
William David Stephen	Independent	10 February 1914 – 10 February 1915	
James Facer Gray Siddins	Independent	10 February 1915 – 17 February 1916	
William David Stephen	Independent	17 February 1916 – February 1919	
Harold Hickson	Independent	February 1919 – December 1920	
William David Stephen	Independent	December 1920 – December 1922	
John Herford	Independent	December 1922 – December 1924	
James Facer Gray Siddins	Independent	December 1924 – 1 December 1927	
Frederick Page	Independent	1 December 1927 – December 1928	
George Frederick Anderson	Independent	December 1928 – December 1930	
Frederick James Kerr	Independent	December 1930 – December 1932	
William Herford	Independent	December 1932 – December 1937	
George Frederick Anderson	Independent	December 1937 – 1 December 1938	
Garnet Arthur Jackson	Labor	1 December 1938 – 4 December 1939	
Cyril Henry Edward Wall	Labor	4 December 1939 – December 1940	
Garnet Arthur Jackson	Labor	December 1940 – December 1941	
George Valentine Arthur	Labor	December 1941 – December 1942	
John James Chalmers	Labor	December 1942 – December 1943	
John Francis McCarthy	Labor	December 1943 – December 1944	
Cecil Dengate Hensley	Labor	December 1944 – December 1945	
James Sydney Greenfield	Labor	December 1945 – December 1946	
Thomas Henry Albert Tierney	Labor	December 1946 – December 1948	
Francis Bernard Joyce	Labor	December 1948 – December 1953	
John Samuel Elphick	Labor	December 1953 – December 1954	
Alexander McPherson	Labor	December 1954 – December 1956	
John Samuel Elphick	Labor	December 1956 – December 1962	
Gladstone Sparks		December 1963 – December 1964	
Alfred P. P. Lever		December 1964 – December 1965	
George R. Hanna		December 1965 – December 1966	
James Slattery		December 1966 – September 1968	
John Samuel Elphick	Labor	September 1968 – September 1969	
James Slattery		September 1969 – September 1970	
Alfred P. P. Lever		September 1970 – September 1971	
James Tobin	Labor	September 1971 – September 1972	
John Samuel Elphick	Labor	September 1972 – September 1974	
Robert Mann	Labor	September 1974 – September 1975	
James Tobin	Labor	September 1975 – September 1976	
Robert Mann	Labor	September 1976 – September 1977	
James Tobin	Labor	September 1977 – September 1980	
Robert Mann	Labor	September 1980 – September 1981	
Ron Hoenig	Labor	September 1981 – 8 September 2012	
Ben Keneally	Labor	8 September 2012 – 12 May 2016	
