= List of mayors of Alexandria =

List of mayors of Alexandria may refer to

- List of mayors of Alexandria, New South Wales Australia
- List of mayors of Alexandria, Virginia in the United States of America
