= 1912 Alexandria state by-election =

Election result for Alexandria, New South Wales, Australia

A by-election was held for the New South Wales Legislative Assembly electorate of Alexandria on 18 May 1912, following the death of John Dacey (Labour).

== Results ==
1912 Alexandria by-election Saturday 18 May
Party	Candidate	Votes	%	±%
Labour	Simon Hickey	3,437	65.4	−3.3
Liberal Reform	William Ferguson	1,695	32.2	+1.3
Socialist	Arthur Duffield	70	1.3	
Independent	James Dixon	56	1.1	
Total formal votes		5,258	97.3	+0.2
Informal votes		147	2.7	−0.2
Turnout		5,405	55.6 (Note: estimate based on an electoral roll of 9,721 at the 1910 election.)	−9.5
Labour hold		Swing		

== See also ==
- Electoral results for the district of Alexandria
- List of New South Wales state by-elections
