= Justin Hickey =

Sir Justin Hickey JP (5 April 1920 – 21 August 2005) was an Australian businessman, insurance executive and philanthropist.

His father Simon Hickey was a New South Wales Labor politician.

== Early life and education ==
Hickey was born in a working class suburb of Sydney, where he attended De La Salle College. He reportedly left school at the age of 14 to work in a factory.

== Career ==
He became wealthy by founding Accident Insurance Mutual, which became Australia's largest privately owned insurer.

== Lifestyle ==
He and his wife, Lady Barbara Hickey, owned Lady Barbara, a 35 m (115 ft) superyacht built in 1983, now known as Emerald Lady. Their home was Bartinon, a mansion standing on 2,325 m^{2} (0.575 acres) of land, once Queensland's most expensive home, located on Marseille Court in the exclusive Sorrento area of Australia's Gold Coast. It was built for about $8 million in the 1980s and sold in 1998.

Hickey, a sailor and raconteur who staunchly supported the Australian National Party, told an ABC Four Corners program in 1982 that he was knighted after giving $100,000 towards the construction of a senior citizens' hospice in Sir Joh Bjelke-Petersen's electorate. Hickey replied to a question regarding the confluence of the contribution and the knighthood by saying "I paid the hundred thousand before I received the knighthood."
