= Leader of the House (New South Wales) =

The Leader of the House, also known as the "Manager of Government Business", is responsible for managing and scheduling Government business in the New South Wales Legislative Assembly. The office is typically held by a cabinet-level Minister of the Crown. The Leader manages the legislative program of the government on sitting days and is the Government's spokesperson on procedural matters in the Legislative Assembly. The leader's counterpart is the Manager of Opposition Business, who consult with each other to facilitate the orderly conduct of business. There is no direct equivalent position in the upper house of parliament, the New South Wales Legislative Council, with government business being managed by the Leader of the Government in the Legislative Council or their deputy.

== List of Leaders ==
Leader	Term began	Term ended	Party	Premier	Notes
Paul Whelan	7 April 1999	28 February 2003	Labor	Bob Carr	
Carl Scully	2 April 2003	26 October 2006	Labor	Bob Carr; Morris Iemma	
David Campbell	26 October 2006	2 March 2007	Labor	Morris Iemma	
John Aquilina	4 May 2007	4 March 2011	Labor	Morris Iemma; Nathan Rees; Kristina Keneally	
Brad Hazzard	3 April 2011	17 April 2014	Liberal	Barry O'Farrell	
Anthony Roberts	23 April 2014	2 April 2019	Liberal	Mike Baird; Gladys Berejiklian	
Andrew Constance	2 April 2019	8 May 2020	Liberal	Gladys Berejiklian	
Mark Speakman	8 May 2020	21 December 2021	Liberal	Gladys Berejiklian; Dominic Perrottet	
Alister Henskens	21 December 2021	3 March 2023	Liberal	Dominic Perrottet	
Ron Hoenig	5 April 2023	Incumbent	Labor	Chris Minns	

== See also ==
- Leader of the House (Australia)
- Leader of the House (Queensland)
- Speaker of the New South Wales Legislative Assembly
- Leader of the Government in the Legislative Council (New South Wales)
