= Philip Dorling =

Australian writer and journalist

- Occupation: Journalist
- Years active: 2008 – 2017
- Notable credit: Canberra Times

Philip Dorling is a writer and journalist who has also served as an Australian public servant and political adviser. He is a visiting fellow at the School of Humanities and Social Science, University of New South Wales at the Australian Defence Force Academy.

== Political career ==
After successfully completing a doctorate at Flinders University in South Australia, Philip Dorling joined the Department of Foreign Affairs and Trade in 1992. Initially employed as a historian, he later took a role in policy in the Department's Conventional and Nuclear Arms Control Branch. He was responsible for Australian involvement with the Missile Technology Control Regime, the South Pacific Nuclear Free Zone, as well as on-site verification aspects of the Comprehensive Nuclear Test Ban Treaty negotiations in 1995-1996. In May 1996, Dorling moved to become an advisor to Laurie Brereton, the Australian Labor Party member for the Federal seat of Kingsford Smith who at the time was serving as Labor foreign affairs spokesman. He continued in this post until 2001, and while employed in this role Dorling was "especially engaged in policy relating to Indonesia and East Timorese self-determination". While working with Laurie Brereton, on 16 September 2000, (the first day after the opening of the Sydney Olympics), Dorling's home was raided by the Australian Federal Police on allegations he had leaked confidential information about East Timor to the media. Described in The Sydney Morning Herald as a "political witch hunt", the police were searching for copies of approximately 80 documents, although no evidence was found. Dorling published an account of the raid and its context in February 2012. After leaving Laurie Brereton's office following the 2001 Federal election, Dorling spent two years (2002-2003) working as an advisor to Daryl Melham, the Shadow Minister for Justice and Customs, a role in which he contributed to the Labor Party's approach to counter-terrorism legislation introduced by Prime Minister John Howard's Government following the September 11, 2001 terrorist attacks in the United States. Dorling was then briefly engaged in the Tasmanian Premier's department in 2003 before moving to the Australian Capital Territory's Chief Minister's department, where he worked as a Senior Manager in the Cabinet Office until 2008.

== Post–politics ==
After leaving the Chief Minister's Department, Dorling joined The Canberra Times and worked there as National Affairs Correspondent until late 2010. He then worked as a Senior Writer for The Age and the Sydney Morning Herald until June 2015. Dorling was again caught up in controversy when the Australian Federal Police raided Dorling's home on 23 September 2008, after he quoted from classified briefing papers intended for the Australian Minister for Defence, Joel Fitzgibbon. Police reportedly seized "several documents" as a result of their search; however no further action followed the raid. Together with Richard Baker and Nick McKenzie of The Age, Dorling published in 2009 and 2010 a series of articles in Canberra Times, The Age and the Sydney Morning Herald relating to Fitzgibbon's relationship with Chinese-Australian businesswoman Helen Liu. Fitzgibbon later resigned from the Defence portfolio.

While working for Fairfax Media he wrote mainly on national security issues and international affairs. He revealed the role of the United States - Australian Joint Defence Facility Pine Gap in providing signals intelligence support for United States drone strikes and other military operations. In late 2010 and 2011 Dorling was responsible for the publication in Australia of the leaked US Embassy cables. While working as a journalist Dorling received Melbourne Press Club Quill Awards and was shortlisted for the Walkley Award for Excellence in Journalism.

Following his work with The Age and Sydney Morning Herald, Dorling contributed to The Saturday Paper in 2015 with articles on United States espionage against Japan and Saudi influence in Australia. In the first half of 2017 Dorling produced a series of research papers on Pauline Hanson's One Nation Party that were published by The Australia Institute. Dorling has also served as a political adviser to South Australian Senator Nick Xenophon and Senator Rex Patrick. In June 2017 Dorling briefly returned to journalism and with Fairfax Media colleagues Baker and McKenzie published in The Age and the Sydney Morning Herald a further expose of Helen's Liu's links with Chinese military intelligence officer Liu Chaoying who had been identified as a significant figure in the 1996 United States 'Chinagate' political funding scandal.

== Publications ==
- Dorling, Philip (1989). The Origins of the ANZUS Treaty: A Reconsideration. Adelaide: Flinders University. ISBN 0-7258-0442-4.
- Dorling, Philip, ed. (1994). Diplomasi: Australia and Indonesia's Independence: Documents 1947. Canberra: Australian Government Publication Service. ISBN 0-644-33249-2.
- Dorling, Philip; Lee, David, eds. (1996). Diplomasi: Australia and Indonesia's Independence: Documents 1948, The Renville Agreement. Canberra: Australian Government Publication Service.
- Dorling, Philip (1996). "South Australia and the Location of Commonwealth Defence Expenditure: The Case of the Submarine Project". In Parkin, Andrew (ed.). South Australia, Federalism and Public Policy. Canberra: Australian National University. ISBN 0-7315-2315-6.
- Desmond Ball, Bill Robinson. Richard Tanter and Philip Dorling (2015), The Corporatisation of Pine Gap, Nautilus Institute for Security and Sustainability, Special Report.
- Dorling, Philip (2016). Atomic Spies in Southern Skies: Operation Crowflight – United States high altitude radiological sampling in Australia 1960-1966, Nautilus Institute for Security and Sustainability, Special Report.
- Dorling, Philip (2017). The American Far Right Origins of Pauline Hanson's Views on Islam, Australia Institute Research Report.
- Dorling, Philip (2017). Pauline Hanson's Neo-Austrian Economic Brain, Australia Institute Research Report.
- Dorling, Philip, and Richardson, David (2017). Easytax Resurrected: A Look at One Nation's economic and taxation policies, Australia Institute Research Report.
- Dorling, Philip (2017). One Nation in Western Australia: Epic Fail or Huge Win? Australia Institute Research Report.
- Dorling, Philip (2017). Still Anti-Asian? Anti-Chinese? One Nation Policies on Asian Immigration and Multiculturalism, Australia Institute Research Report.
- Dorling, Philip (2017). "The White Queen: Correspondence", Quarterly Essay, No 66, pp. 136–140.
