= Fred Page (politician) =

Australian politician

Frederick Joseph Page (14 August 1858 – 18 February 1929) was an Australian politician.

He was born in Richmond, Colony of New South Wales, to tanner Seth Richard Page and Sarah Hearne. He left school early to become a tanner's apprentice, working in Granville before taking over a Botany tannery in 1887. He married Elizabeth Priscilla Barratt in 1880; they had three children. Page was a Botany alderman from 1898 to 1903 and from 1924 to 1928, serving as mayor in 1902 and 1928. In 1907 he was elected to the New South Wales Legislative Assembly as the Labor member for Botany. He opposed the 1913 referendum and was refused endorsement, but was re-elected anyway as an Independent Labor member. He lost his seat in 1917. He died at Botany in 1929. On his death, Botany council renamed the suburb of Pagewood in his honour.

Civic offices
Preceded by William Stephen	Mayor of Botany; 1902 – 1903	Succeeded by Francis Luland
Preceded by James Siddins	Mayor of Botany; 1927 – 1928	Succeeded by George Anderson
New South Wales Legislative Assembly
Preceded by Rowland Anderson	Member for Botany; 1907–1917	Succeeded by Thomas Mutch
