= Laurie Brereton =

Australian politician (born 1946)

The Honourable Laurie Brereton
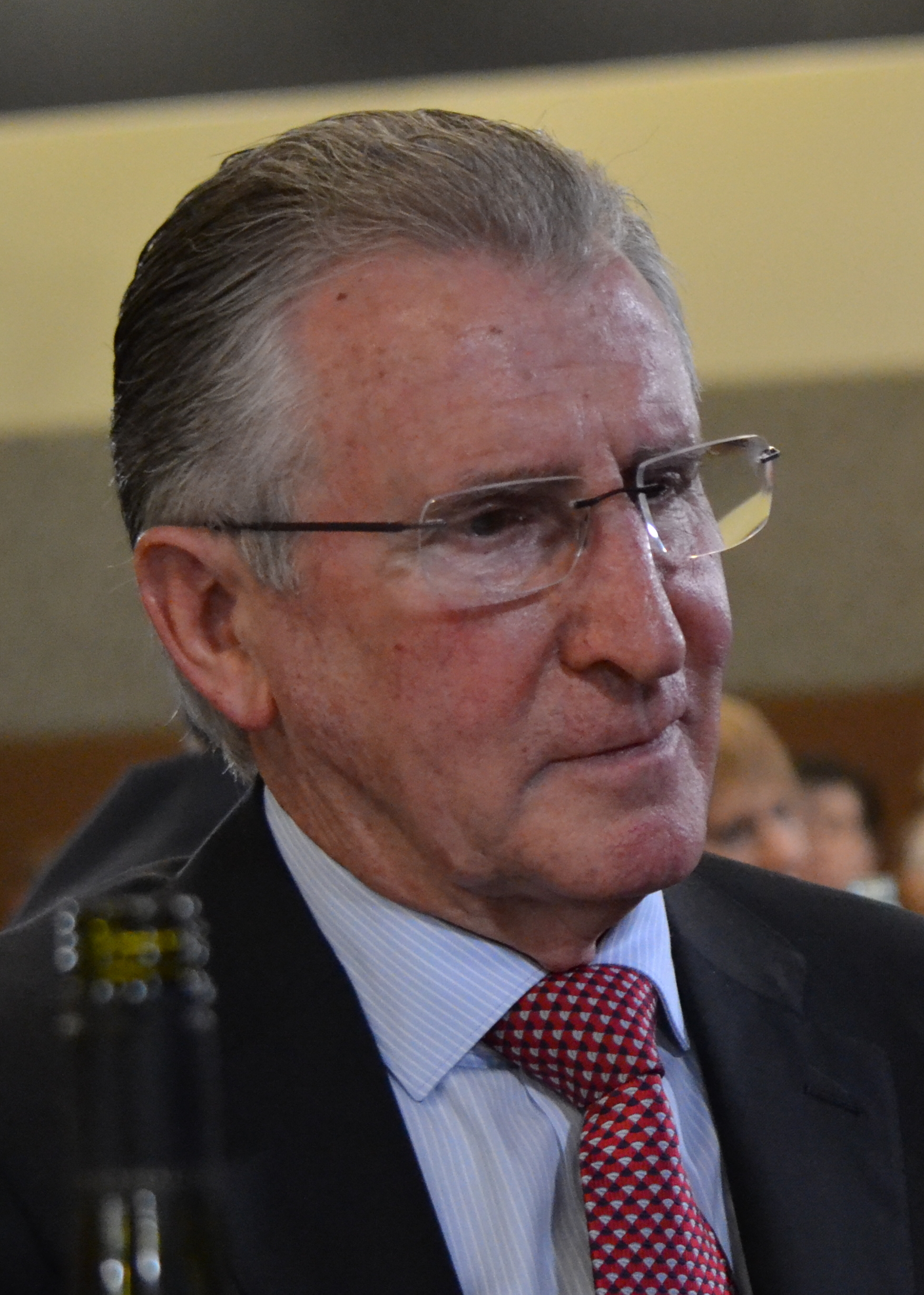
- Laurie Brereton in 2016. Photo by Rob Keating

Australian Minister for Transport
- In office 24 December 1993 – 11 March 1996
- Prime Minister: Paul Keating
- Preceded by: Bob Collins
- Succeeded by: John Sharp

Australian Minister for Industrial Relations
- In office 24 March 1993 – 11 March 1996
- Prime Minister: Paul Keating
- Preceded by: Peter Cook
- Succeeded by: Peter Reith

Member of the Australian Parliament for Kingsford-Smith
- In office 24 March 1990 – 31 August 2004
- Preceded by: Lionel Bowen
- Succeeded by: Peter Garrett

NSW Minister for Public Works and Ports
- In office 10 February 1984 – 26 November 1987
- Premier: Neville Wran; Barrie Unsworth
- Preceded by: Laurie Ferguson
- Succeeded by: Peter Cox

Personal details
- Born: 29 May 1946 (age 80) Kensington, New South Wales, Australia
- Party: Australian Labor Party
- Spouse: Dr Tricia Kavanagh
- Relations: Deirdre Grusovin (sister)
- Occupation: Electrician

Laurence John Brereton (born 29 May 1946) is an Australian former politician who was a state minister, a federal member of cabinet, and kingmaker in the election of several Australian Labor Party leaders, including Paul Keating and Mark Latham. He was a Labor member of the Australian House of Representatives from March 1990 to October 2004, representing the Division of Kingsford Smith, New South Wales. He is credited with building Sydney's controversial monorail.

== Early life ==
Brereton was born in the Sydney suburb of Kensington, and educated at De La Salle Catholic College, Coogee, now defunct. He was apprenticed and worked as an electrical tradesman to the Sydney County Council, a former council-owned retailer of electricity in inner Sydney.

== Political career ==
=== New South Wales politics ===
Brereton served in the New South Wales Legislative Assembly as member for Randwick 1970–71 and Heffron 1973–90. He survived the political controversy of the Botany Council affair in the mid-'70s when he was accused of attempting to influence ALP aldermen who were considering an application to rezone a block of land. He and Geoffrey Cahill, then Labor's NSW general secretary (and grandson of former Premier Joseph Cahill), appeared in court on bribery and conspiracy charges but after 17 days of hearings and evidence from high-powered witnesses, including Rupert Murdoch, all charges were thrown out.

In the governments led by Neville Wran and (from 1986) Barrie Unsworth, Brereton was Minister for Health 1981–84, Minister for Roads 1983–84 and 1984–87, Minister for Public Works 1984–87 and Minister for Employment 1984.

=== Federal politics ===
Upon switching to the federal Parliament, Brereton was Parliamentary Secretary to the Prime Minister 1991–93, Minister for Industrial Relations 1993–96, Minister for Transport 1993–96, and Minister Assisting the Prime Minister for Public Service Matters 1993. In March 1996, the ALP government lost office to John Howard.

Brereton was a member of the Opposition Shadow Ministry 1996–2001 serving as Shadow Minister for Foreign Affairs. Assisted by his adviser, Dr Philip Dorling, Brereton was instrumental in revising Federal Labor policy to support self-determination and independence for East Timor. Brereton was a vocal critic of Howard, who supported East Timor's continued integration in Indonesia. He was also strongly critical of the performance of past Labor Governments, in particular Prime Minister Gough Whitlam who acquiesced to Indonesia's intentions to invade East Timor in 1975. , During 1998 and 1999 Brereton highlighted evidence of the Indonesian military's involvement in pro-integrationist violence in East Timor and was a strident advocate of United Nations peacekeeping to support East Timor's independence ballot. Brereton was a member of the Australian Parliamentary observer mission that witnessed the conduct of the ballot.

Brereton's break from previous Australian bipartisanship on East Timor policy was an important factor in the Howard Government's eventual decision to change Australian policy and intervene in East Timor in September 1999. According to historian and former Australian Army officer Clinton Fernandes, "The ALP's change of policy – and the resulting pressure of the [Australian] Government – was a critical factor in the independence of East Timor." Brereton's activism on the East Timor issue was strongly opposed by senior Labor political figures, notably Whitlam and former Foreign Minister Gareth Evans and found little support from Federal Labor leader Kim Beazley. However Beazley was reluctant to challenge Brereton's handling of the issue and eventually accepted the change in Labor policy. Following controversy in 1999, over leaked Australian intelligence reports relating to East Timor and the Indonesian military, Australian Federal Police and Defence Security agents raided Dr Dorling's home in September 2000, but no classified material was found.

Taking into account his service in the New South Wales Parliament, Brereton had the longest period of parliamentary service of any member of the Parliament elected in 2001. In June 2004 he announced his retirement from politics at the 2004 federal election. He helped engineer the candidacy of the rock singer Peter Garrett as his successor in the seat.

== Personal life ==
His wife, Justice Dr Tricia Kavanagh, was a Judge on the Industrial Relations Commission of New South Wales and is the President of New South Wales Labor Party. They have two sons. Brereton is the younger brother of Deirdre Grusovin.

New South Wales Legislative Assembly
Preceded by Lionel Bowen	Member for Randwick; 1970–1971	Succeeded by Seat abolished
Preceded by New seat	Member for Heffron; 1973–1990	Succeeded by Deirdre Grusovin
Political offices
Preceded by Kevin Stewart	NSW Minister for Health; 1981–1984	Succeeded by Ron Mulock
New title	NSW Minister for Employment; 1984	Succeeded by Bob Debus
Preceded by Laurie Ferguson	NSW Minister for Public Works and Ports; 1984–1987	Succeeded by Peter Cox
Preceded by Rex Jackson	NSW Minister for Roads; 1984–1987	Succeeded by Wal Murray
Parliament of Australia
Preceded by Lionel Bowen	Member for Kingsford Smith; 1990–2004	Succeeded by Peter Garrett
Political offices
Preceded by Peter Cook	Minister for Industrial Relations; 1993–1996	Succeeded by Peter Reith
Preceded by Bob Collins	Minister for Transport; 1993–1996	Succeeded by John Sharp
