= Rowland Anderson =

Australian politician

Rowland Joseph Anderson (30 September 1872 – 29 August 1959) was an Australian politician.

He was born in Kurrajong to farmer William James Anderson and Sarah Roberts. He attended public school at Parramatta but left at sixteen to work as a tanner at Smithfield. On 16 September 1896 he married Minnie Maud Critchley; they had four children. In 1896 he established his own tannery business in Botany, and in 1904 was elected a local alderman. Also in 1904, he was elected to the New South Wales Legislative Assembly as the Liberal member for Botany. He did not re-contest in 1907. From 1929 to 1931 he was federal president of the Master Tanners Association; he was also deputy chair of the federal Hide and Leather Industries Board during both world wars.

Anderson died in Mosman on 29 August 1959 (aged 86).

New South Wales Legislative Assembly
Preceded by John Dacey	Member for Botany; 1904–1907	Succeeded by Fred Page
