= Electoral district of Alexandria =

Former electoral district of New South Wales

Alexandria New South Wales—Legislative Assembly
- State: New South Wales
- Dates current: 1904–1920, 1927–1930
- Namesake: Alexandria

Alexandria was an electoral district of the Legislative Assembly in the Australian state of New South Wales, created in 1904, partly replacing Waterloo, and named after and including the Sydney suburb of Alexandria. With the introduction of proportional representation, it was absorbed into the multi-member electorate of Botany. It was recreated in 1927, but was abolished in 1930.

== Members for Alexandria ==
John Dacey, the sitting Labor MP for Botany since 1895, was defeated for Labor pre-selection in that seat. However he agreed to stand in the newly formed seat of Alexandria. His main opponent was George Anderson, the Liberal Reform MP who had held the seat of Waterloo since its creation in 1894. In one of the closest results of the 1904 election, Dacey defeated Anderson by a mere 117 votes. At the 1907 election, Dacey defeated sitting MP for Surry Hills Albert Bruntnell. Dacey increased his majority at the 1910 election and served until his death on 11 April 1912. The resulting by-election in May saw Dacey's son-in-law Simon Hickey easily account for the Liberal Reform's William John Ferguson who was the Member for Sturt from 1894 to 1904. Hickey increased his majority at the 1913 election and defeated high-profile former state and federal MP Sydney Smith in 1917. Hickey went to serve as one of the members for Botany from 1920. When the seat was recreated in 1927, former MP for Botany Bill Ratcliffe served one term before the seat was abolished for good.

First incarnation (1904–1920)
Member	Party	Term
John Dacey	Labour	1904–1912
Simon Hickey	Labor	1912–1920
Second incarnation (1927–1930)
Bill Ratcliffe	Labor	1927–1930

== Election results ==
1927 New South Wales state election: Alexandria
Party	Candidate	Votes	%	±%
Labor	Bill Ratcliffe	8,370	67.6	
Nationalist	Ernest Kidd	4,018	32.4	
Total formal votes		12,388	98.8	
Informal votes		150	1.2	
Turnout		12,538	82.7	
Labor win		(new seat)		
