= John Lee (Australian politician) =

Australian politician

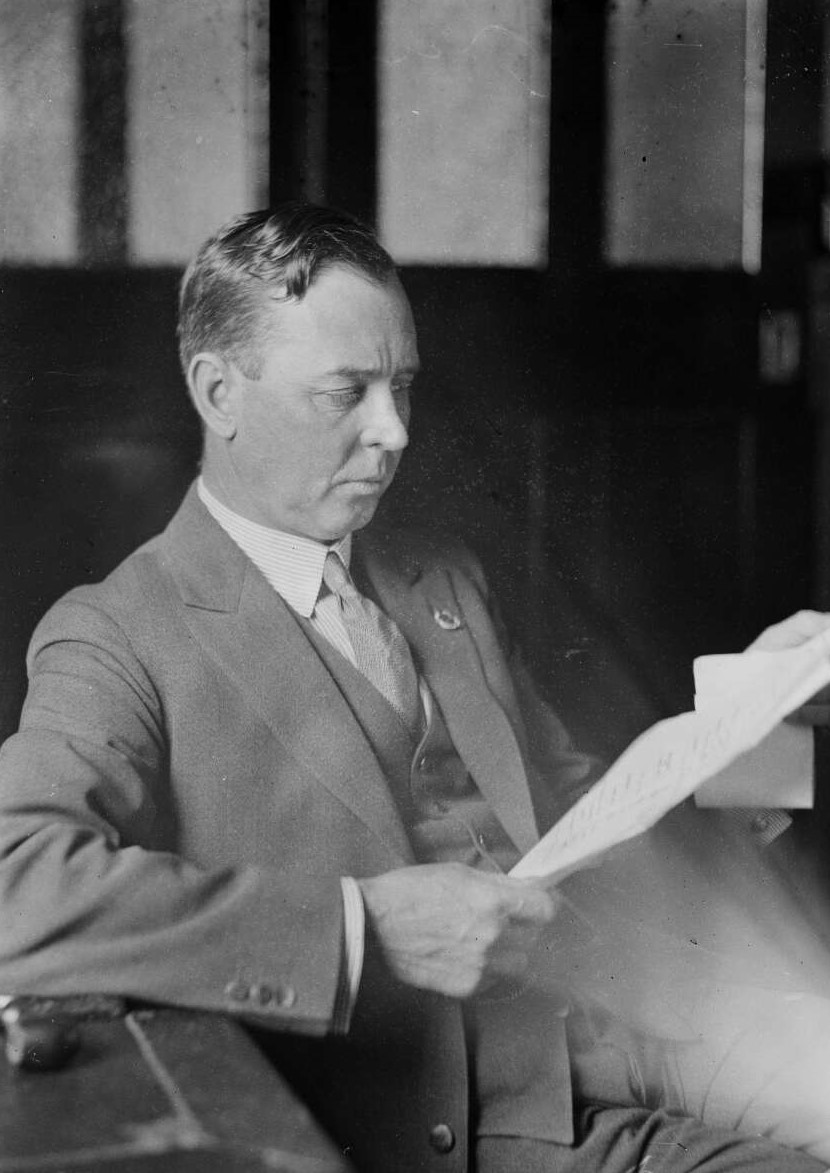

John Robert Lee (19 October 1885 – 2 November 1957) was an Australian politician.

== Life, education and career ==
Born at Hedley Hill, Lanchester, Durham, to coalminer James Lee and Jessie Watson, he was educated at public schools in Leadgate and Durham before attending Cliff College in Sheffield. He worked as a water works engineer for ten years and became a Methodist minister before coming to Australia in 1910, preaching at Yanco and Gilgandra. From 1915 to 1918 he served as a lieutenant with the 21st Battalion of the Australian Imperial Force. On 28 February 1920 he married Gladys Irene Dickinson. In 1920 Lee was elected to the New South Wales Legislative Assembly as the Nationalist member for Botany; following the abolition of proportional representation in 1927 he was elected for Drummoyne. He was Nationalist Whip from 1922 to 1927 and Minister for Justice from 1927 to 1930; in 1931 he joined the United Australia Party. From 1934 to 1937 he was also an alderman at Drummoyne, serving as mayor in 1936. He left the Assembly in 1941, and from 1940 to 1943 served again in the AIF. From 1944 to 1945 he was a captain in the United States Army. Lee died in 1957 at Gordon.

New South Wales Legislative Assembly
Preceded by Thomas Mutch	Member for Botany; 1920–1927; Served alongside: Burke, Hickey/Ratcliffe, McKell, Mutch	Succeeded by Thomas Mutch
New seat	Member for Drummoyne; 1927–1930	Succeeded by David McLelland
Preceded by David McLelland	Member for Drummoyne; 1932–1941	Succeeded by Robert Greig
