= Thomas Mutch =

Australian politician

Mutch in 1922.

Thomas Davies Mutch (17 October 1885 – 4 June 1958) was an Australian politician and genealogist.

== Early life ==
Born in London to bus driver William Murdoch Mutch and Sarah Davies, he arrived in New South Wales in 1887 and was educated at Double Bay Public School. He was subsequently a shearer for four years and joined the Australian Workers' Union, becoming a staff worker in 1903 and helping to found the Australian Writers and Artists Union in 1910. On 23 September 1912, he married Edith Marjorie Hasenham; he remarried on 26 March 1928 Dorothy Anette Joyce at Melbourne, with whom he had two children. From 1915 to 1916, he was New South Wales president and federal vice-president of the Australian Journalists' Association and was convicted of incitement after the 1917 general strike.

== Politics ==
He was an alderman at Mascot from 1923 to 1930 and Randwick from 1931 to 1937. Having been a member of the Australian Labor Party's central executive from 1913 to 1917 and maintaining a strong stance against conscription, he was elected to the New South Wales Legislative Assembly in 1917 as the Labor member for Botany. Under Labor Premier John Storey, Mutch served as Minister for Local Government and Minister of Public Instruction from 1920 to 1921, but kept only the latter position after Storey's death in late 1921 until Labor was defeated in the 1922 election. In these roles he was one of the few Labor men to speak at a war memorial on Anzac Day, coming under fire at the opening of the Burwood memorial in 1921 for his anti-militarist opposition to the display of machine guns and other weapons in schools and at public memorials (although he could not actually stop local councils from doing so).

When party leader James Dooley resigned in 1923 and was replaced by Jack Lang, Mutch became more deeply involved in Labor's political infighting and challenged the controversial new leader for his position on 27 June 1924, losing by just one vote. Labor won the 1925 election, Mutch again took up the role of (newly renamed) Minister for Education, but a continually combative relationship with Premier Lang led to Mutch's exclusion from cabinet in May 1927. Soon after, Mutch was elected the leader of an informal Labor splitoff group that began to be called the 'Scabinet', but after a 'Unity Conference' in July 1927, he and many of his allies were formally expelled from NSW Labor. Mutch was still able to win the seat of Botany as an independent in 1927, but lost it in the 1930 election, working as a freelance journalist until he returned to parliament as the United Australia Party member for Coogee. Despite a slow rightward shift in his views, Mutch was still ill-at-ease in the UAP, and was defeated in the 1941 election after becoming thoroughly disillusioned with politics.

== Later Life and Legacy ==
In the years between his elected positions and after, Mutch worked as a freelance journalist, and further developed his life-long interest in Australian history. He had supported and worked with the Mitchell Library in Sydney from 1916, and would become a diligent and prominent figure in local history and genealogical circles in life after politics. From 1943 to 1947 he was especially active in the Royal Australian Historical Society, and became a fellow of the Society of Australian Genealogists in 1946. His 'Mutch Index' contains comprehensive records of individuals who were born or had migrated into the colony of NSW from 1787 to 1828 and some beyond into the 20th century, and remains a crucial tool for Australian genealogists. In his last decade his energy dropped off, his genealogical and historical work slowed to a crawl and he split with his wife Dorothy in 1955, later dying in his home in Coogee in 1958.

His great-nephew Stephen Mutch was a state and federal Liberal MP.

New South Wales Legislative Assembly
Preceded by Fred Page	Member for Botany; 1917 – 1920	District abolished
New district MMP introduced	Member for Botany; 1920 – 1927; Served alongside: Hickey/Ratcliffe, Burke, McKell, Lee	District abolished
New district MMP abolished	Member for Botany; 1927 – 1930	Succeeded by Bob Heffron
Preceded by John Dunningham	Member for Coogee; 1938 – 1941	Succeeded by Lou Cunningham
Political offices
Preceded by Augustus James	Minister of Public Instruction; 1920 – 1921	Succeeded by Thomas Ley
Preceded by John Daniel FitzGerald	Minister for Local Government; 1920 – 1921	Succeeded by George Cann
Preceded by Thomas Ley	Minister of Public Instruction; 1921 – 1922	Succeeded by Albert Bruntnell
Preceded by Albert Bruntnell as Minister of Public Instruction	Minister for Education; 1925 – 1927	Succeeded by Billy Davies as Minister of Public Instruction
