= Ron Hoenig =

Australian politician

The Honourable Ron Hoenig MP

Minister for Local Government
- Incumbent
- Assumed office 5 April 2023
- Premier: Chris Minns
- Preceded by: Wendy Tuckerman

Leader of the House
- Incumbent
- Assumed office 5 April 2023
- Premier: Chris Minns
- Preceded by: Alister Henskens

Vice-President of the Executive Council
- Incumbent
- Assumed office 5 April 2023
- Premier: Chris Minns
- Preceded by: Penny Sharpe

Manager of Opposition Business
- In office 11 June 2021 – 5 April 2023
- Leader: Chris Minns
- Preceded by: Ryan Park
- Succeeded by: Alister Henskens

Member of the New South Wales Legislative Assembly for Heffron
- Incumbent
- Assumed office 25 August 2012
- Preceded by: Kristina Keneally
Local government offices
39th Mayor of the Municipality of Botany
In office September 1981 – 11 May 1996
Deputy	George Glinatsis
Preceded by	Robert Mann
Succeeded by	City proclaimed
39th Mayor of the City of Botany Bay
In office 11 May 1996 – 8 September 2012
Deputy	George Glinatsis
Preceded by	City proclaimed
Succeeded by	Ben Keneally
Alderman of the Municipality of Botany for Mascot Ward
In office 20 September 1980 – 31 June 1993
Councillor of the Municipality of Botany for Mascot Ward
In office 1 July 1993 – 11 May 1996
Councillor of the City of Botany Bay for Mascot Ward
In office 11 May 1996 – 11 September 1999

Personal details
- Born: 21 April 1953 (age 73) Camperdown, New South Wales, Australia
- Party: Labor Party
- Profession: Barrister
- Website: ronhoenig.blogspot.com

Ron Hoenig (born 21 April 1953) is an Australian barrister and current member for Heffron in the New South Wales Legislative Assembly. He is currently the Minister for Local Government, Vice-President of the Executive Council, and Leader of the House, in the NSW Labor Government of Premier Chris Minns. He previously served as Mayor of the City of Botany Bay in New South Wales from 1981 to 2012, a record 31 years, before standing down and winning the 2012 Heffron state by-election in the state parliament for the Labor Party.

== Early life and background ==
Hoenig was born in Camperdown on 21 April 1953, and at age five moved with his parents from Maroubra to a house in King Street, Eastlakes. Hoenig received his education at local schools, Eastlakes Public School, Daceyville Public School, and JJ Cahill Memorial High School in Mascot.

With a university education beyond his family's financial resources, at age 19 Hoenig was employed in the Petty Sessions Branch of the Attorney General and Justice Department, and with the removal of university fees by the Whitlam Labor Government, he enrolled to study law at the Solicitors’ Admission Board (now the Legal Profession Admission Board) and was admitted with a Diploma in Law to practise law in New South Wales in 1980. Hoenig worked as an articled clerk, and then as a solicitor in the Public Solicitor's Office, practising litigation and criminal law. In 1987, he was appointed as a Public Defender for the State of New South Wales, a role he held until being elected to parliament in 2012.

== Legal career ==
Hoenig was a practising barrister and public defender, who acted as the counsel assisting the inquiry into the death of Dianne Brimble, where he made recommendations that up to three of the persons assisting the inquiry could face prosecution. He defended David Dinh, who was accused of killing New South Wales MP John Newman. Dinh was acquitted by a jury.

== Local council ==
After being elected as an alderman of the Municipality of Botany in September 1980, Hoenig was elected mayor in 1981 and became the first popularly elected mayor of the council in 1983, with 85% of the vote. He was re-elected mayor in 1987 (unopposed), 1991 (80%), 1995 (88%), 1999 (unopposed), 2004, and 2008. Hoenig was mayor when Botany was proclaimed the City of Botany Bay on 11 May 1996.

During his time as mayor, Hoenig campaigned on various issues such as heritage protection, where he supported the establishment of the Botany Historical Trust in 1994 and commissioned the Botany Bay Heritage Study in 1996, as well as the non-expansion of both the Botany Port and Sydney Airport. He did not seek re-election at the 2012 local government elections.

== State parliament ==
Hoenig was preselected as the Labor candidate for 25 August 2012 Heffron by-election in the New South Wales Legislative Assembly, following the parliamentary resignation of former premier and state Labor MP Kristina Keneally. Hoenig drew top spot on the ballot paper, with three other candidates from the CDP, Greens and Democrats. Hoenig won with a 60 percent primary and 70 percent two-candidate-preferred vote.

== Personal life ==
Hoenig's parents Ernest and Edith migrated to Australia after World War II. Edith was a Holocaust survivor born in Czechoslovakia and Ernest was born in Austria. Hoenig married Christine Stamper on 27 June 1985 at St Bernard's Roman Catholic Church, Botany, and the marriage produced two sons; Benjamin and Matthew. Hoenig is a member of the Maroubra Synagogue.

Hoenig is a supporter of the South Sydney Rabbitohs rugby league club, having served as a board director in 1999, and was a prominent opponent at the time of the National Rugby League's efforts to remove the club from the competition and proposals to merge it with other clubs.

Civic offices
Preceded by Robert Mann	Mayor of Botany; 1981–1996	City Proclaimed
New title Council proclaimed	Mayor of Botany Bay; 1996–2012	Succeeded by Ben Keneally
New South Wales Legislative Assembly
Preceded by Kristina Keneally	Member for Heffron; 2012–present	Incumbent
Preceded by Ryan Park	Manager of Opposition Business; 2021–2023	Succeeded by Alister Henskens
Preceded by Alister Henskens	Leader of the House; 2023–present	Incumbent
Political offices
Preceded by Wendy Tuckerman	Minister for Local Government; 2023–present	Incumbent
Preceded by Penny Sharpe	Vice-President of the Executive Council; 2023–present	Incumbent
