= List of mayors of Alexandria, New South Wales =

People who served as the mayor of the Municipality of Alexandria are:

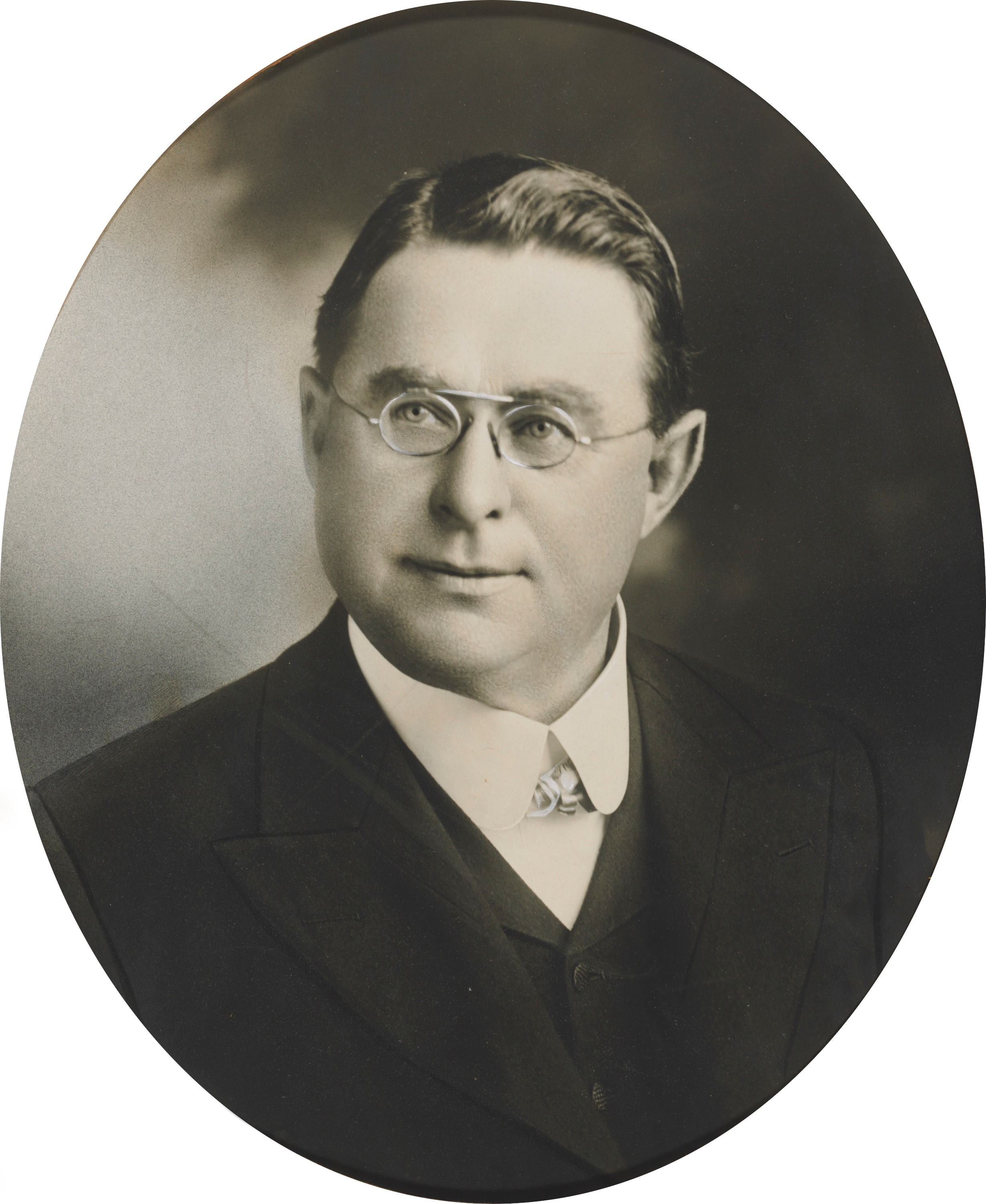
John Dacey, Mayor 1888–1890

Mayors	Party	Term start	Term end	Notes
Edward John Hawksley	None	7 October 1868	11 December 1868	
Samuel Sparks	None	7 January 1869	10 February 1869	
Edward John Hawksley	None	10 February 1869	10 February 1870	
William Bryant	None	10 February 1870	17 February 1872	
George Bretnall	None	17 February 1872	13 February 1874	
George E. Wood	None	13 February 1874	February 1875	
Stephen John Foskett	None	February 1875	12 February 1878	
Charles Brandling Henderson	None	12 February 1878	12 February 1884	
Charles Jesson	None	12 February 1884	8 February 1887	
Stephen John Foskett	None	8 February 1887	15 February 1888	
John Dacey	None	15 February 1888	14 February 1890	
John Turner	None	14 February 1890	11 February 1891	
James Ralph	None	11 February 1891	10 February 1892	
William Marr	None	10 February 1892	23 February 1893	
John Harden	None	23 February 1893	14 February 1895	
James Christie Horne	None	14 February 1895	13 February 1896	
Ernest Banner	None	13 February 1896	11 February 1897	
John Harden	None	11 February 1897	9 February 1898	
Michael O'Riordan	None	9 February 1898	15 February 1899	
Alfred Moles	None	15 February 1899	13 February 1900	
Ernest Banner	None	13 February 1900	February 1901	
Michael O'Riordan	None	February 1901	February 1902	
David Turnbull Brown	None	13 February 1902	12 February 1903	
James Ralph	None	12 February 1903	February 1904	
Frederick Charles Loveridge	None	February 1904	16 February 1905	
Michael O'Riordan	None	16 February 1905	15 February 1906	
Samuel Alexander McCauley	None	15 February 1906	February 1912	
Michael O'Riordan	None	February 1912	February 1914	
James Ralph	None	February 1914	3 February 1915	
Edward F. Lawson	None	3 February 1915	February 1917	
William Henry Wassall	None	February 1917	February 1918	
John Joseph Collins	None	February 1918	February 1920	
William Henry Wassall	None	February 1920	7 December 1922	
George James Stokes	None	7 December 1922	December 1923	
Joseph Rogers	None	December 1923	December 1924	
William Henry Smith	Labor	December 1924	December 1925	
William Charles Ellis	Progressive	December 1925	December 1926	
John Joseph Collins	Progressive	December 1926	December 1928	
Joseph Bowden	Labor / Labor (NSW)	December 1928	December 1931	
Richard Power	Labor (NSW)	December 1931	December 1932	
Charles Humphries	Labor (NSW)	December 1932	December 1933	
Samuel Chenhall	Labor (NSW)	December 1933	December 1934	
Arthur Reginald Horatio Perry	Labor (NSW)	December 1934	December 1935	
Richard Power	Labor (NSW) / Labor	December 1935	December 1936	
Samuel Chenhall	Labor	December 1936	December 1937	
Fred Green	Labor	December 1937	December 1938	
Arthur Reginald Horatio Perry	Labor	December 1938	December 1939	
Sydney Henry Gordon Alexander	Labor	December 1939	December 1940	
William Henry Smith	Labor	December 1940	December 1942	
Samuel Chenhall	Labor	December 1942	December 1943	
Hugh Vincent McConville	Labor	December 1943	December 1944	
Fred Green	Labor	December 1944	December 1945	
Arthur Reginald Horatio Perry	Labor	December 1945	December 1946	
John Joseph Collins	Labor	December 1946	December 1947	
Kevin Dwyer	Labor	December 1947	31 December 1948	
