= Bill Ratcliffe =

Australian politician (1880–1935)

Wilfred Joseph "Bill" Ratcliffe (30 May 1880 – 25 March 1935) was an Australian politician. He was a Labor Party member of the New South Wales Legislative Assembly from 1922 until 1932, representing the districts of Botany (1922–1927), Alexandria (1927–1930) and Barwon (1930–1932). He was Secretary of Public Works and Minister for Railways for four months in 1927, during the last months of the first Lang government.

Ratcliffe was born at Pyrmont, and was a tram driver before entering politics as a local alderman. He was an unsuccessful Labor candidate at the 1920 state election, when he was placed fifth and last on the Labor ticket for multi-member Botany. He again contested Botany in 1922 and was again placed fifth on the Labor list, but this time, campaigned for voters to ignore the official ticket and give him their first preference. The tactic was successful, and he was elected at the expense of fellow Labor MLA Simon Hickey; however, it earned him significant enmity within the Labor Party. He was expelled by the Labor executive in April and sat as an Independent Labor member, but was readmitted to the party in July.

Ratcliffe was re-elected in 1925 when Labor won a majority under Jack Lang, and was promoted to the ministry in 1927, when Martin Flannery was dropped in a reshuffle. His ministerial career was cut short by Labor's defeat that year; however, he was re-elected as the member for Alexandria. The Alexandria seat was abolished in 1930, and Ratcliffe lost the preselection ballot for inner-city Redfern. The executive tried to find him another seat; after rumours he would run for Monaro, he was appointed candidate for the traditionally conservative rural seat of Barwon. He won the seat, but suffered from ill health during his final term, and retired in 1932. He died in 1935, and was buried in the Roman Catholic section of Rookwood Cemetery.

New South Wales Legislative Assembly
Preceded by Simon Hickey	Member for Botany (multi-member); 1922 – 1927; Served alongside: Mutch, Burke, McKell, Lee	Succeeded by Thomas Morrow
Preceded by Seat recreated	Member for Alexandria (single-member); 1927 – 1930	Succeeded by Seat abolished
Preceded by Walter Wearne	Member for Barwon (single-member); 1930 – 1932	Succeeded by Ben Wade
