= Electoral district of Heffron =

State electoral district of New South Wales, Australia

Heffron New South Wales—Legislative Assembly
- Interactive map of district boundaries from the 2023 state election
- State: New South Wales
- Dates current: 1973–present
- MP: Ron Hoenig
- Party: Labor Party
- Namesake: Bob Heffron
- Electors: 60,576 (2019)
- Area: 35.28 km^{2} (13.6 sq mi)
- Demographic: Inner-Metropolitan
Electorates around Heffron:
Summer Hill	Newtown	Sydney
Canterbury	Heffron	Coogee
Rockdale	Maroubra	Maroubra

Heffron is an electoral district of the Legislative Assembly in the Australian state of New South Wales located primarily in Sydney's Inner Southern Region. It is named after Robert Heffron, a former Labor premier of New South Wales.

It is a safe Labor seat, currently represented by Ron Hoenig of the Labor Party since August 2012.

== History ==
Created in 1973 from the abolished seat of Cook's River, the seat was represented from 2003 to 2012 by former New South Wales Premier Kristina Keneally of the Labor Party. At the 2011 election, Keneally suffered a swing of over 16 percent, more than halving her majority from 23 percent to seven percent. She resigned the seat on 29 June 2012 to start her new career as CEO of Basketball Australia, prompting an August Heffron by-election. At the by-election, Ron Hoenig won with 70 percent of the two-candidate preferred vote.

== Geography ==
On its current boundaries, Heffron includes the suburbs of Alexandria, Beaconsfield, Waterloo, Zetland, Rosebery, Mascot, St Peters, Sydenham, Tempe, most of Eastlakes and Kensington and parts of Kingsford. Sydney (Kingsford Smith) Airport is located within the electorate. The district was named after Bob Heffron who was the local MP for Botany and Maroubra. The seat was contested for the first time in the year 1973, won by Laurie Brereton and has always been held by the Labor party.

== Members for Heffron ==
Member	Party	Period
Laurie Brereton	Labor	1973–1990
Deirdre Grusovin	Labor	1990–2003
Kristina Keneally	Labor	2003–2012
Ron Hoenig	Labor	2012–present

== Election results ==
2023 New South Wales state election: Heffron
Party	Candidate	Votes	%	±%
Labor	Ron Hoenig	22,458	49.7	+7.4
Liberal	Francis Devine	9,597	21.2	−6.5
Greens	Philipa Veitch	8,559	18.9	+1.1
Independent	Sarina Kilham	1,538	3.4	+3.4
Animal Justice	Linda Paull	1,252	2.8	−0.5
Sustainable Australia	Ann Godfrey	889	2.0	+2.0
Socialist Alliance	Rachel Evans	878	1.9	+1.9
Total formal votes		45,171	97.1	−0.2
Informal votes		1,328	2.9	+0.2
Turnout		46,499	82.6	−0.7
Two-party-preferred result
Labor	Ron Hoenig	29,757	73.3	+8.0
Liberal	Francis Devine	10,847	26.7	−8.0
Labor hold		Swing	+8.0	
