= William Stephen (Australian politician) =

Australian politician (1829–1913)

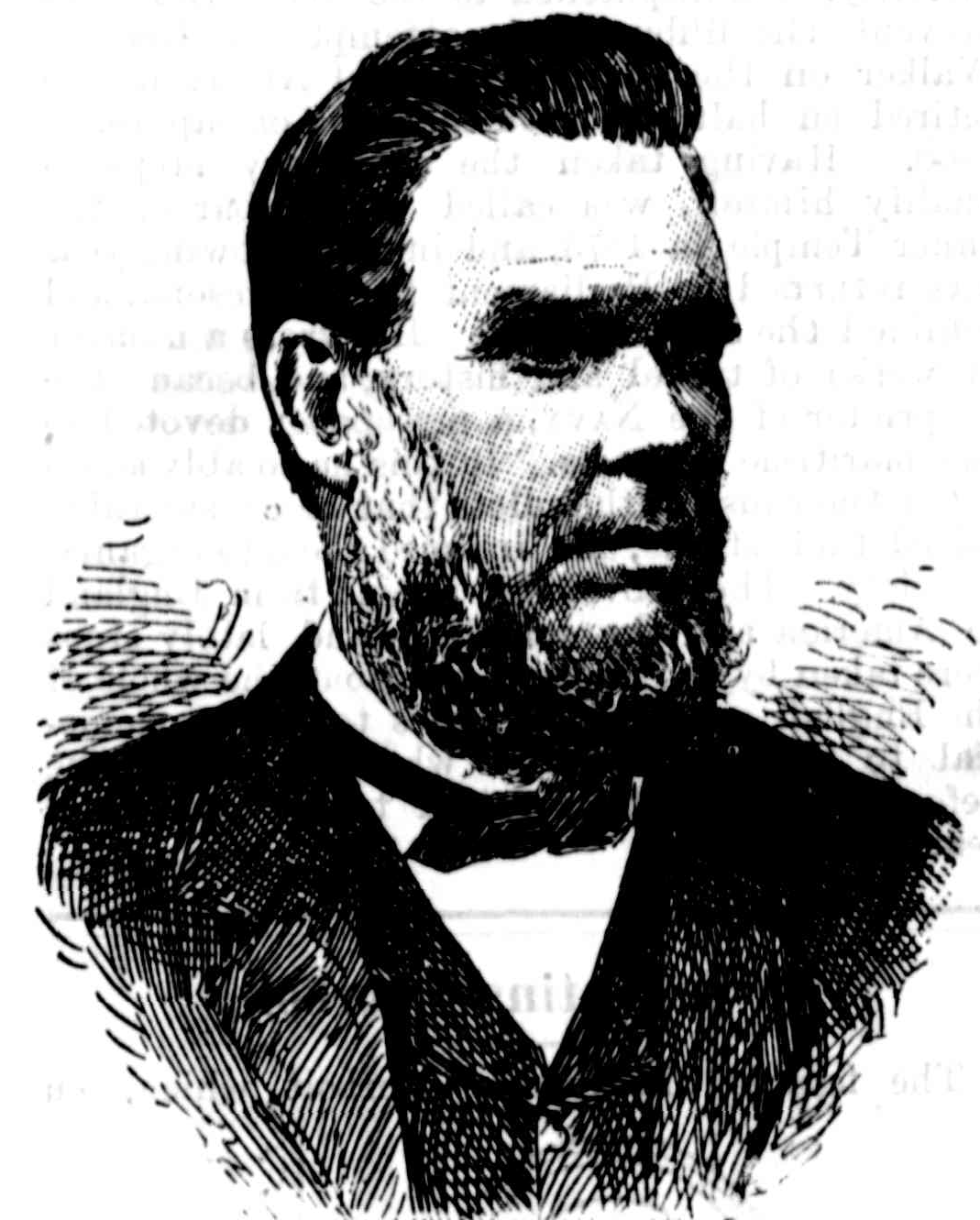

William Stephen (1829 – 28 December 1913) was an Irish-born Australian politician.

== Early life and career ==
He was born in County Cavan to farmer James Stephen and Jane Smith. He and his family moved to Australia in 1848, and after unsuccessful attempts at mining in New South Wales and Victoria he settled in Sydney as a gardener and fruitgrower. On 14 April 1857 he married Mary Montgomery, with whom he had seven children. After converting the swamps around Botany Bay into fertile land, he established a business in woolscouring and fellmongering.

== Political career ==
Stephen attempted to enter the New South Wales Legislative Assembly for the district of Redfern at the by-election in March 1886 but was defeated by Arthur Renwick. The following year he joined the newly created Free Trade Party of Sir Henry Parkes and was elected 3rd of 4 free trade members for Redfern, defeating the Protectionist Party candidates, including Renwick. He managed to hold his seat at the 1889 election, despite the resurgent Protectionist Party taking 2 of the 4 seats. He was defeated in 1891 with the emergence of Labour as a political force in NSW. Multi-member electorates were abolished in the 1893 redistribution, and Stephen stood as an independent free trade candidate for the new district of Botany at the election in July 1894. Defeated in 1895, he unsuccessfully contested Botany again in 1898 and 1901. He did not hold any ministerial or party position.

In 1901 was elected Mayor of Botany, serving for one year. He died at Botany on 28 December 1913 (aged 84).

New South Wales Legislative Assembly
Preceded by John Sutherland; Thomas Williamson; Arthur Renwick	Member for Redfern; 1887–1891; With: James Farnell / James Howe; William Schey/Charles Goodchap; John Sutherland / William Schey	Succeeded by Henry Hoyle; William Schey; James McGowen; William Sharp
New seat	Member for Botany; 1894–1895	Succeeded by John Dacey
Civic offices
Preceded by Oscar William Nilson	Mayor of Botany; 1901 – 1902	Succeeded by Fred Page
