= City of Botany Bay =

Former local government area in New South Wales, Australia

- Local government area
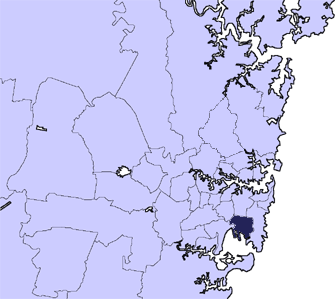

- Country: Australia
- State: New South Wales
- Region: South-Eastern Sydney
- Established: 29 March 1888 (Botany); 11 May 1996 (Botany Bay)
- Abolished: 9 September 2016
- Council seat: Botany Town Hall, Botany

Government
  - Mayor: Ben Keneally (Labor)

Area
  - Total: 26.75 km^{2} (10.33 sq mi)

Population
  - Total: 39,356 (2011 census)
  - Density: 1,471/km^{2} (3,810/sq mi)
- Parish: Botany
- Website: City of Botany Bay
LGAs around City of Botany Bay
Marrickville	Sydney	Randwick
Marrickville	City of Botany Bay	Randwick
Rockdale	Botany Bay	Randwick

The City of Botany Bay was a local government area in the Inner South and South-Eastern region of Sydney, in the state of New South Wales, Australia. The area encompassed the suburbs to the north of Botany Bay, such as Botany. First proclaimed in 1888 as the "Borough of Botany", the council became the "Municipality of Botany" from 1906 to 1996, when it was proclaimed a city as the "City of Botany Bay".

The administrative centre was located at Mascot, which is 7 kilometres (4.3 mi) south of the Sydney central business district. The city was amalgamated with the neighbouring City of Rockdale on 9 September 2016 to form Bayside Council. The last mayor of the City of Botany Bay prior to amalgamation was Cr. Ben Keneally, a member of the Labor Party and the husband of Kristina Keneally, a former Premier of New South Wales.

== Suburbs in the local government area ==
Suburbs in the City of Botany Bay were:

- Banksmeadow
- Botany
- Botany Bay
- Daceyville
- Eastgardens
- Eastlakes
- Hillsdale
- Mascot (minor part located within Marrickville Council)
- Pagewood (parts are located in City of Randwick council)
- Rosebery (parts are located in City of Sydney council)

== History ==
Real estate map for Town of Botany, 1907

First proclaimed in 1888 as the "Borough of Botany", the first council, divided into three wards (Booralee Ward, Cook Ward, Banks Ward), was elected on 9 June 1888. On 15 July 1899, the Botany Town Hall, designed by Byera Hadley, was opened by the governor, Lord Beauchamp. The town hall remained the seat and primary meeting-place of the council until amalgamation in 2016.

The council became the "Municipality of Botany" from 1906 to 11 May 1996, when it was proclaimed a city as the "City of Botany Bay" by the Governor of New South Wales, Gordon Samuels at Sir Joseph Banks Park in Botany. The council wards were abolished from 31 January 1908. Under the Local Government (Areas) Act 1948, the Municipality of Mascot (formerly North Botany), which was located immediately to the North, was amalgamated into Botany.

=== ICAC Operation Ricco ===
In February 2016, the NSW Independent Commission Against Corruption (ICAC) commenced a public inquiry (known as Operation Ricco) into allegations that the former chief financial officer employed by the council and other council employees, dishonestly exercised official functions to obtain financial benefits for themselves and others by causing fraudulent payments of more than A$4.2 million to be made by the council through false invoicing to either themselves, or various entities. It was also alleged that the former chief financial officer and the council employees dishonestly exercised official functions to obtain financial benefits for themselves and others by using council resources. The inquiry heard that certain senior staff were "totally unqualified" for their positions, and that a culture of "extremely poor corporate governance" allowed official corruption to occur.

It was also revealed that the council's General Manager until 2011, Peter Fitzgerald, had used thousands of dollars in "discretionary" council funds for personal items, private travel for himself and family, in addition to receiving annual cheques for $20,000 from the council for travelling expenses. Fitzgerald admitted that he had not seen a single statement for any of his council accounts until shortly before his retirement in 2011, and was not aware if he had exceeded those "discretionary" limits.

In July 2017, ICAC released its report and found that former chief financial officer, Gary Goodman, and eleven other council employees had acted corruptly, after raising more than $5 million in fake invoices and charging more than $600,000 in personal expenditure on council credit cards, and recommended prosecutions against all. However, despite the specific findings against individuals, the final report noted in particular that "The scale, breadth and duration of corruption at the Council cannot be attributed to a few rogue individuals alone. Overwhelming failures in the Council’s procedures and governance framework created significant opportunities for corruption, and Mr Goodman and others took full advantage."

With the merger of Botany Bay into Bayside Council in September 2016, the legacy of "significant breakdowns in administrative, financial and governance internal controls identified in the former council" had ramifications for the auditing and accounting processes in the new Council with the Council stating that it was unable "to ensure completeness of [their] financial statements as a whole", and the first mayor of Bayside Council, Bill Saravinovski, in particular noted that, "the misappropriations and costs of remediation result in a net fund deficit of $17 million, placing Bayside Council at a significant disadvantage".

=== Creation of Bayside Council ===
A 2015 review of local government boundaries by the NSW Government Independent Pricing and Regulatory Tribunal recommended that the City of Botany Bay merge with the City of Rockdale to form a new council with an area of 50 square kilometres (19 sq mi) and support a population of approximately 153,000.

There was significant community opposition to the merger from within both communities. In Botany Bay, residents were given the chance to have their say in a community poll which was held on 27 February 2016. Ultimately 97.8 per cent of Botany Bay residents voted 'no' when asked the question 'Do you agree that the City of Botany Bay should merge with Rockdale City Council?'. Botany Bay attempted to seek a compromise by proposing to merge with the City of Randwick and parts of the City of Sydney.

With the proclamation of the majority of council amalgamations on 12 May 2016, Botany Bay Council appealed the decision in the Supreme Court of New South Wales, thereby delaying the proposed amalgamation until a decision was made by the Court. The Supreme Court rejected the appeal in early September 2016, and the Minister for Local Government, Paul Toole, moved quickly to proclaim the formation of Bayside Council on 9 September 2016, with the former administrator of Central Darling Shire, Greg Wright, appointed as the Administrator.

== Demographics ==
As of the 2011 census, there were 39,356 people in the Botany Bay local government area, of these 49.5% were male and 50.5% were female. Aboriginal and Torres Strait Islander people made up 1.6% of the population. The median age of people in the City of Botany Bay was 37 years. Children aged 0 – 14 years made up 18.2% of the population and people aged 65 years and over made up 14.4% of the population. Of people in the area aged 15 years and over, 47.6% were married and 11.4% were either divorced or separated.

Population growth in the City of Botany Bay between the 2001 census and the 2006 census was 5.18%; and in the subsequent five years to the 2011 census, population growth was 5.19%. When compared with total population growth of Australia for the same periods, being 5.78% and 8.32% respectively, population growth in Botany Bay local government area was lower than the national average.

Selected historical census data for the City of Botany Bay local government area
Census year		2001	2006	2011
Population	Estimated residents on Census night	35,572	37,415	39,356
Population	LGA rank in terms of size within New South Wales		61	
Population	% of New South Wales population		0.5%	0.57%
Population	% of Australian population	0.19%	▼0.18%	0.18%
Cultural and language diversity				
Ancestry, top responses	Australian			16.7%
Ancestry, top responses	English			14.5%
Ancestry, top responses	Chinese			8.0%
Ancestry, top responses	Irish			5.8%
Ancestry, top responses	Greek			5.6%
Language, top responses (other than English)	Greek	7.4%	▼6.5%	▼5.8%
Language, top responses (other than English)	Bengali	3.4%	▲3.5%	▲3.6%
Language, top responses (other than English)	Indonesian	n/c	n/c	▲3.2%
Language, top responses (other than English)	Spanish	4.5%	▼3.8%	▼3.2%
Language, top responses (other than English)	Mandarin Chinese	n/c	n/c	▲3.0%
Religious affiliation				
Religious affiliation, top responses	Catholic	35.0%	▼34.2%	▼32.9%
Religious affiliation, top responses	No religion	7.5%	▲10.1%	▲13.0%
Religious affiliation, top responses	Anglican	13.2%	▼12.2%	▼10.8%
Religious affiliation, top responses	Eastern Orthodox	10.9%	▼10.2%	▼9.5%
Religious affiliation, top responses	Islam	8.3%	▼7.8%	▲8.1%
Median weekly incomes				
Personal income	Median weekly personal income		A$453	A$575
Personal income	% of Australian median income		97.2%	99.7%
Family income	Median weekly family income		A$995	A$1,488
Family income	% of Australian median income		96.9%	100.5%
Household income	Median weekly household income		A$1,166	A$1,245
Household income	% of Australian median income		99.6%	100.9%

== Council ==
=== Final composition and election method ===
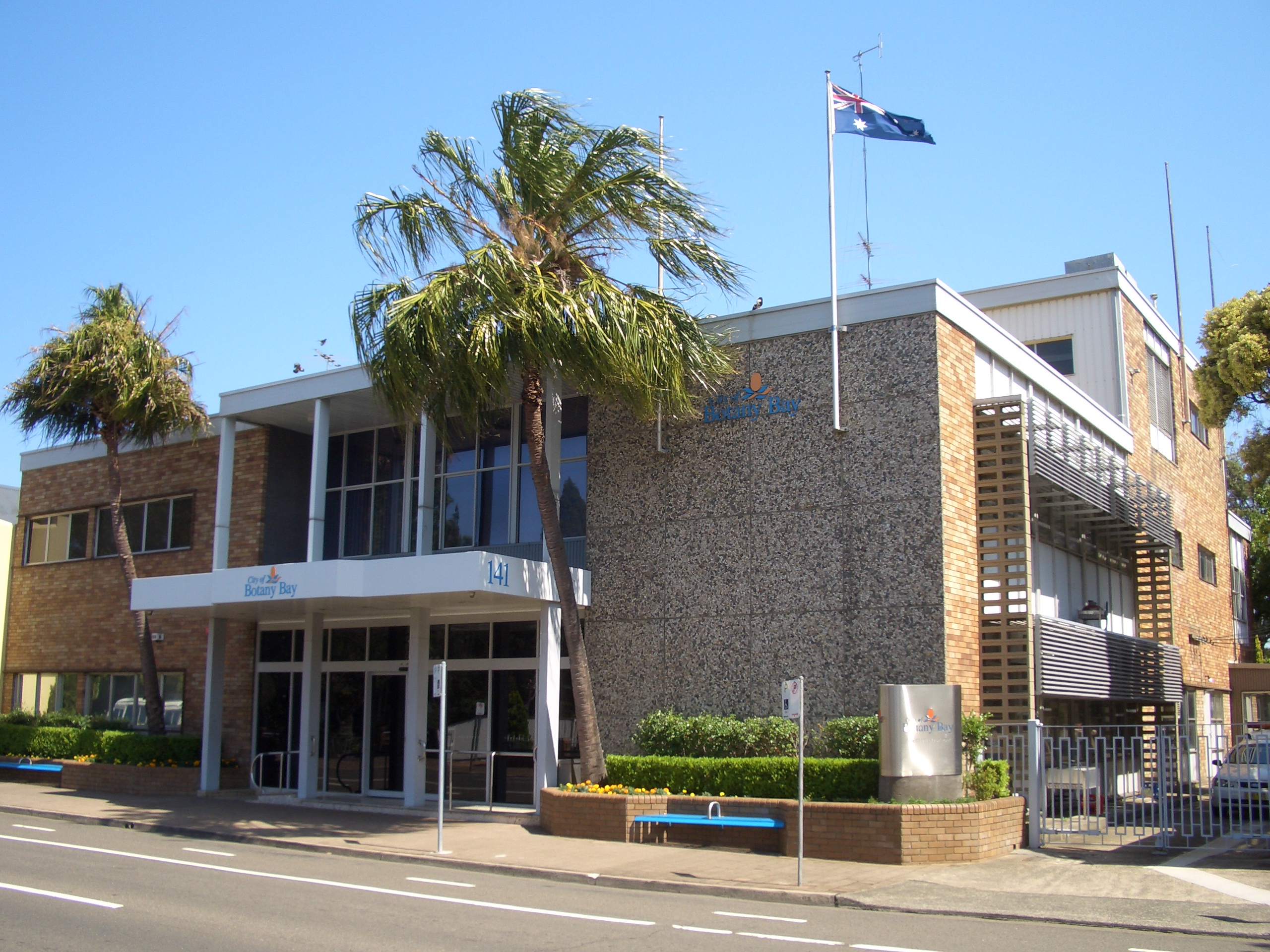
City of Botany Bay Administration Building, Mascot

Botany Bay City Council was composed of seven councillors, including the mayor, for a fixed four-year term of office. The mayor was directly elected for a four-year term from 1995 to 2016 while the six other Councillors were elected proportionally as six separate wards, each electing one councillor. From 1948 to 1995 the council consisted of 15 councillors/aldermen, with three elected in each of five wards. From 1995 to 2008, the councillors were elected at-large and from 2008 to 2012 the councillors were elected to three wards (A, B, C), with two councillors elected in each. The most recent election was held on 8 September 2012. In Wards One and Five, only one candidate nominated for election. There being no additional candidates, the election for these Wards was uncontested. The final makeup of the council at the last election for the term 2012–2016, including the mayor, was as follows:

Ward	Councillor	Party	Notes
Mayor	Ben Keneally	Labor	Mayor 2012–2016
Ward One	George Glinatsis	Labor	Elected 1991, Deputy Mayor 1995–2015
Ward Two	Brian Troy	Labor	Elected 1987
Ward Three	Christina Curry	Labor	Elected 2012
Ward Four	Stan Kondilios	Labor	Elected 1995, Deputy Mayor 2015–2016
Ward Five	Greg Mitchell	Labor	Elected 1982
Ward Six	Mark Castle	Labor	Elected 2008

== Election results ==
=== 2012 ===
2012 New South Wales local elections: Botany Bay
Party	Votes	%	Swing	Seats	Change
Liberal	8,902	66.33		6	Steady
Independent	3,264	24.32		0	Steady
Greens	1,254	9.34		0	Steady
Formal votes	13,420				

== Mayors ==
Seal of the Municipality of Botany, from 1938 Jubilee History, depicts the landing of Captain James Cook at Botany Bay in 1770. The Latin motto, Sicut Patribus Sit Deus Nobis, translates to "God be with us as He was with our fathers".

Mayor	Party	Term	Notes
James John Macfadyen	Independent	20 August 1888 – 13 February 1890	
John E. Chant	Independent	13 February 1890 – 14 February 1891	
Charles R. Swinbourne	Independent	14 February 1891 – 10 February 1893	
Francis John Luland	Independent	10 February 1893 – 14 February 1895	
James John Macfadyen	Independent	14 February 1895 – 13 February 1896	
Joseph Pemberton	Independent	13 February 1896 – 9 February 1897	
Joshua Wiggins	Independent	9 February 1897 – 8 February 1898	
Francis Hambly	Independent	8 February 1898 – 10 February 1900	
Oscar William Nilson	Independent	10 February 1900 – 16 February 1901	
William Stephen	Independent	16 February 1901 – 10 February 1902	
Frederick Page	Independent	10 February 1902 – 12 February 1903	
Francis John Luland	Independent	12 February 1903 – 20 February 1905	
Clement Frederick Etherden	Independent	20 February 1905 – February 1909	
Frederick Anderson	Independent	February 1909 – 11 February 1910	
John Herford	Independent	11 February 1910 – 9 February 1911	
William Hale	Independent	9 February 1911 – 12 February 1913	
Oscar William Nilson	Independent	12 February 1913 – 10 February 1914	
William David Stephen	Independent	10 February 1914 – 10 February 1915	
James Facer Gray Siddins	Independent	10 February 1915 – 17 February 1916	
William David Stephen	Independent	17 February 1916 – February 1919	
Harold Hickson	Independent	February 1919 – December 1920	
William David Stephen	Independent	December 1920 – December 1922	
John Herford	Independent	December 1922 – December 1924	
James Facer Gray Siddins	Independent	December 1924 – 1 December 1927	
Frederick Page	Independent	1 December 1927 – December 1928	
George Frederick Anderson	Independent	December 1928 – December 1930	
Frederick James Kerr	Independent	December 1930 – December 1932	
William Herford	Independent	December 1932 – December 1937	
George Frederick Anderson	Independent	December 1937 – 1 December 1938	
Garnet Arthur Jackson	Labor	1 December 1938 – 4 December 1939	
Cyril Henry Edward Wall	Labor	4 December 1939 – December 1940	
Garnet Arthur Jackson	Labor	December 1940 – December 1941	
George Valentine Arthur	Labor	December 1941 – December 1942	
John James Chalmers	Labor	December 1942 – December 1943	
John Francis McCarthy	Labor	December 1943 – December 1944	
Cecil Dengate Hensley	Labor	December 1944 – December 1945	
James Sydney Greenfield	Labor	December 1945 – December 1946	
Thomas Henry Albert Tierney	Labor	December 1946 – December 1948	
Francis Bernard Joyce	Labor	December 1948 – December 1953	
John Samuel Elphick	Labor	December 1953 – December 1954	
Alexander McPherson	Labor	December 1954 – December 1956	
John Samuel Elphick	Labor	December 1956 – December 1962	
Gladstone Sparks		December 1963 – December 1964	
Alfred P. P. Lever		December 1964 – December 1965	
George R. Hanna		December 1965 – December 1966	
James Slattery		December 1966 – September 1968	
John Samuel Elphick	Labor	September 1968 – September 1969	
James Slattery		September 1969 – September 1970	
Alfred P. P. Lever		September 1970 – September 1971	
James Tobin	Labor	September 1971 – September 1972	
John Samuel Elphick	Labor	September 1972 – September 1974	
Robert Mann	Labor	September 1974 – September 1975	
James Tobin	Labor	September 1975 – September 1976	
Robert Mann	Labor	September 1976 – September 1977	
James Tobin	Labor	September 1977 – September 1980	
Robert Mann	Labor	September 1980 – September 1981	
Ron Hoenig	Labor	September 1981 – 8 September 2012	
Ben Keneally	Labor	8 September 2012 – 12 May 2016	

== Town Clerks/General Managers ==
The Local Government Act, 1993 removed the requirement that the administrative head of a council be a "Town or Shire Clerk" and specified that the head was to be known as the "General Manager".

Years	Officeholder	Notes
8 August 1888 – 27 May 1889	George Garton	
27 May 1889 – 12 November 1890	Samuel Tickle	
12 November 1890 – 27 October 1899	Benjamin Radford	
27 October 1899 – December 1912	Benjamin Morgan	
December 1912 – 12 February 1913	J. A. Wauchope (acting)	
12 February 1913 – August 1915	Roland Charles Rose	
September 1915 – September 1923	Samuel Morgan	
September 1923 – 30 March 1939	Leo Roy Flack	
30 March 1939 – 24 May 1939	John Edward Brotchie (acting)	
24 May 1939 – April 1943	Sidney D. Marchant	
May 1943 – 31 December 1948	John Edward Brotchie	
1 January 1949 – September 1964	T. G. Barber	
September 1964 – 1974	R. Madden	
1974 – 1982	J. Evans	
1982 – 1984	A. S. Ford	
1984 – 1997	J. F. Patterson	
1997 – June 2011	Peter Fitzgerald	
June 2011 – 12 May 2016	Lara Kirchner	

== Coat of arms ==
Coat of arms of the City of Botany Bay

Notes
Final design of grant made by the Garter, Clarenceux, and Norroy & Ulster kings of arms, of the College of Arms.
Adopted
1988
Motto
Value Our Heritage
Symbolism
The Kangaroo supporter represents the native fauna of Australia and the Bengal tiger supporter references Australia’s first zoo established in Botany in 1840, the Sir Joseph Banks Pleasure Gardens. Both wear an Astral crown, which refers to the importance of the aviation industry to the area which includes Sydney Airport. The banksia flower (Banksia ericifolia) above a mural crown in the crest represents the native flora and references the man for whom the flower is named, Sir Joseph Banks, the botanist who sailed with Captain James Cook into Botany Bay on HMS Endeavour in April 1770. Botany Bay and its importance to shipping at Port Botany is represented in the escutcheon by the anchor and wavy blue lines, which also reference the area's position at the mouth of the Cook's River. The gold Polar star in the escutcheon is taken from the arms of James Cook, while the gold Fleur-de-lis is taken from the arms of Joseph Banks. The gold and black colours in the escutcheon are also taken from Banks' arms.
