= Electoral district of Botany =

Former state electoral district of New South Wales, Australia

Botany was an electoral district of the Legislative Assembly in the Australian state of New South Wales, originally created in 1894, partly replacing Redfern, and named after and including the Sydney suburb of Botany. In 1920, parts of the electoral districts of Botany, Alexandria, Enmore, Newtown and Redfern were combined to create a new incarnation of Botany, which elected five members by proportional representation. This was replaced by single member electorates, including parts of Botany, Alexandria, Enmore, Newtown and Redfern for the 1927 election. Botany was abolished in 1950, being partly replaced by Maroubra.

== Members for Botany ==
1894–1920, 1 member
| Member | Party | Term | | | | | | | | | | | | |
|---|---|---|---|---|---|---|---|---|---|---|---|---|---|---|
| William Stephen | Ind. Free Trade | 1894–1895 | | | | | | | | | | | | |
| John Dacey | Labour | 1895–1904 | | | | | | | | | | | | |
| Rowland Anderson | Liberal Reform | 1904–1907 | | | | | | | | | | | | |
| Fred Page | Labour | 1907–1913 | | | | | | | | | | | | |
| Fred Page | Independent Labour | 1913–1917 | | | | | | | | | | | | |
| Thomas Mutch | Labor | 1917–1920 | | | | | | | | | | | | |
1920–1927, 5 members
| Member | Party | Term | Member | Party | Term | Member | Party | Term | Member | Party | Term | Member | Party | Term |
| Thomas Mutch | Labor | 1920–1927 | Simon Hickey | Labor | 1920–1922 | Frank Burke | Labor | 1920–1927 | William McKell | Labor | 1920–1927 | John Lee | Nationalist | 1920–1927 |
| Thomas Mutch | Labor | 1920–1927 | Bill Ratcliffe | Labor | 1922–1927 | Frank Burke | Labor | 1920–1927 | William McKell | Labor | 1920–1927 | John Lee | Nationalist | 1920–1927 |
1927–1950, 1 member
| Member | Party | Term | | | | | | | | | | | | |
| Thomas Mutch | Independent Labor | 1927–1930 | | | | | | | | | | | | |
| Robert Heffron | Labor | 1930–1938 | | | | | | | | | | | | |
| Robert Heffron | Industrial Labor | 1938–1939 | | | | | | | | | | | | |
| Robert Heffron | Labor | 1939–1950 | | | | | | | | | | | | |
