= Simon Hickey (politician) =

Australian politician

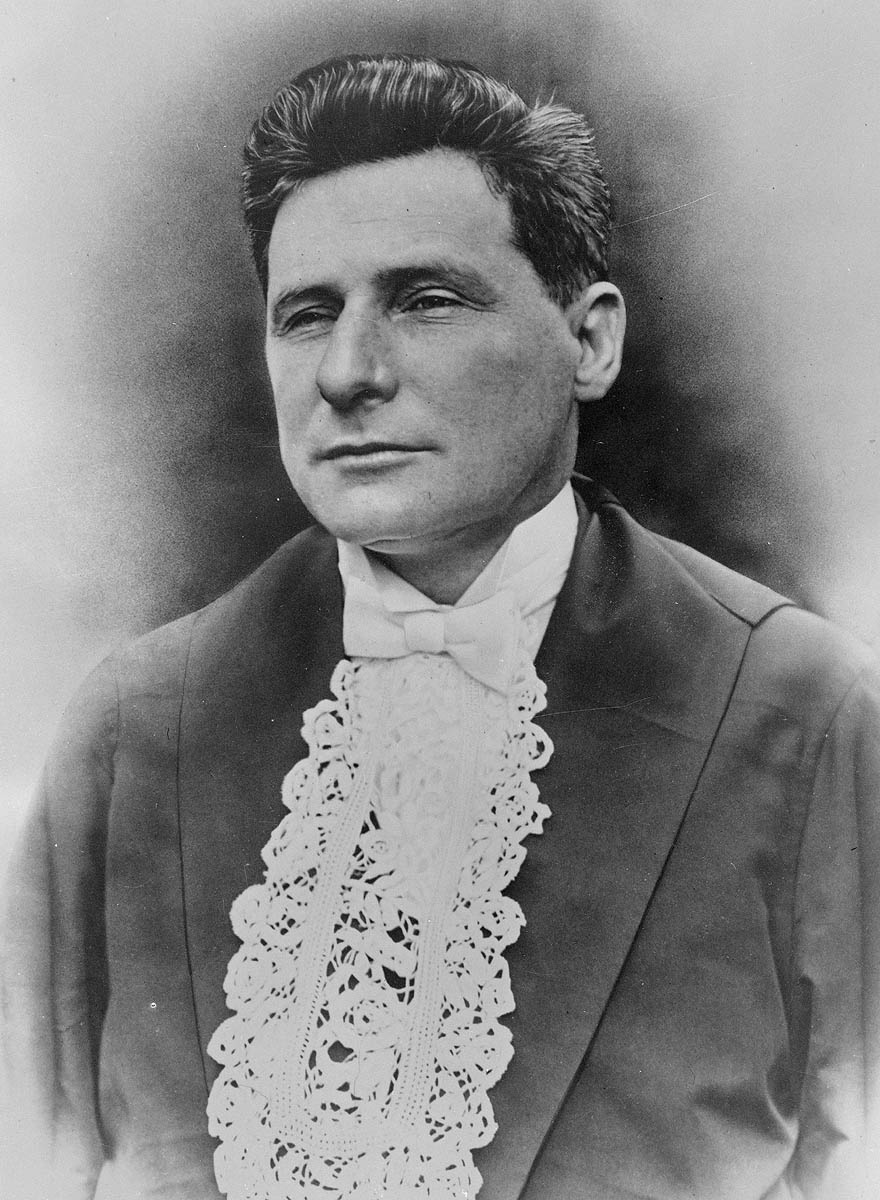
Simon Hickey as Speaker in December 1921

Simon Hickey (6 June 1878 – 18 May 1958) was an Australian politician.

He was born at Botobolar near Mudgee to agricultural labourer Patrick Hickey, an Irish-American, and Mary, née Swift. His family moved to Menah in 1882 and to Auburn in 1890. Hickey received a primary education but at the age of thirteen left school to work as a drayman's assistant, eventually being apprenticed to a Mudgee saddler in 1893. He worked in Sydney for the saddler's firm, which failed. In 1911, he married Hilda Ellen Dacey, daughter of Labour MP John Dacey.

In 1912, he entered the New South Wales Legislative Assembly as the Labour member for Alexandria on the death of his father-in-law; he moved to the multi-member seat of Botany in 1920. The 1920 election was evenly divided with Labor only able to govern due to Nationalist Daniel Levy controversially accepting re-election as speaker. Levy resigned as speaker and on 13 December 1921 Hickey was elected speaker. This left the Dooley Labor Government without a majority in parliament. Eight days later the government was defeated on the floor and resigned. Hickey resigned as speaker, replaced by Levy which enabled Labor to regain government. His term remains the shortest in the history of the Assembly. He was defeated in 1922 but in 1925 was given a life appointment to the New South Wales Legislative Council, which he held until the council's reconstitution in 1934.

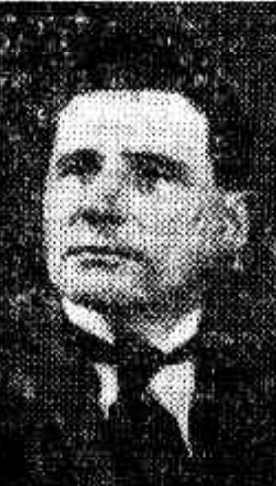
Hickey c. 1927

Hickey's memoir, Travelled Roads, was published in 1951.

Hickey died at Bellevue Hill on 18 May 1958 (aged 79).

His son was Sir Justin Hickey.

New South Wales Legislative Assembly
| Preceded by John Dacey | Member for Alexandria; 1912–1920 | District abolished |
| Preceded by Thomas Mutch | Member for Botany; 1920–1922; Served alongside: Burke, Lee, McKell, Mutch | Succeeded by Bill Ratcliffe |
| Preceded by Daniel Levy | Speaker of the New South Wales Legislative Assembly; December 1921 | Succeeded by Daniel Levy |
