= Deirdre Grusovin =

Australian politician

The Honourable Deirdre Grusovin AM

Member of the New South Wales Parliament for Heffron
- In office 23 June 1990 – 20 March 2003
- Preceded by: Laurie Brereton
- Succeeded by: Kristina Keneally

Member of the New South Wales Legislative Council
- In office 6 November 1978 – 31 May 1990

Personal details
- Born: Deirdre Mary Brereton; 1 September 1938 (age 88)
- Spouse: Walter Grusovin (m. 1962)
- Relations: Laurie Brereton (brother)
- Occupation: Politician; librarian and shopkeeper

Deirdre Mary Grusovin AM (née Brereton; born 1 September 1938) is an Australian former politician who was a Labor member of the New South Wales Parliament for over twenty five years.

Grusovin was born in Sydney, and is the sister of influential former politician Laurie Brereton. She was educated at Our Lady of the Sacred Heart College in Kensington. Prior to entering politics, she was a librarian for the City of Randwick from 1957 to 1962 and then managed her husband's pharmacy business until 1978.

Initially elected to the New South Wales Legislative Council in 1978, she remained in office until 1990. During this time she was Minister for Consumer Affairs and Assistant Minister for Health 1986-88 and Minister for Small Business 1987–88. In 1990, she contested a by-election in Heffron, winning the seat in the New South Wales Legislative Assembly which had been vacated by her brother, who transferred to Federal Parliament. At the time of her transfer to the lower house, she was touted as a potential challenger to Bob Carr for the Labor leadership. She was re-elected in Heffron in 1991.

On 1 December 1994, Grusovin used parliamentary privilege to air a statutory declaration by convicted pedophile Colin John Fisk alleging that politician Frank Arkell and lawyer John Marsden were pederasts. Labor leader Bob Carr had urged her not to do so, but Grusovin proceeded to read part of the document to parliament without further notice. Premier John Fahey called on Labor leader Bob Carr to sack her from the shadow ministry if she would not produce supporting evidence and the NSW Law Society labelled her actions "a gross abuse of parliamentary privilege". Marsden challenged Grusovin to repeat the comments outside parliament, and would later successfully sue a media outlet for defamation over the allegations. Carr forced her resignation the following day, having staked his leadership on the outcome.

Grusovin was re-elected in 1995 and 1999, but spent the remainder of her career on the backbench. She resigned from parliament in 2003, following defeat in a bitter preselection battle with Kristina Keneally in 2002. Grusovin threatened to take her case to the Supreme Court, but ultimately stepped aside and Keneally succeeded her in 2003.

She was appointed a Member of the Order of Australia in the 2016 Australia Day Honours for significant service to the Parliament and the community of New South Wales, to education administration, and to social welfare.

New South Wales Legislative Assembly
Preceded by Laurie Brereton	Member for Heffron; 1990–2003	Succeeded by Kristina Keneally
