= John Dacey =

Australian politician (1854–1912)

The Honourable John Dacey MLA
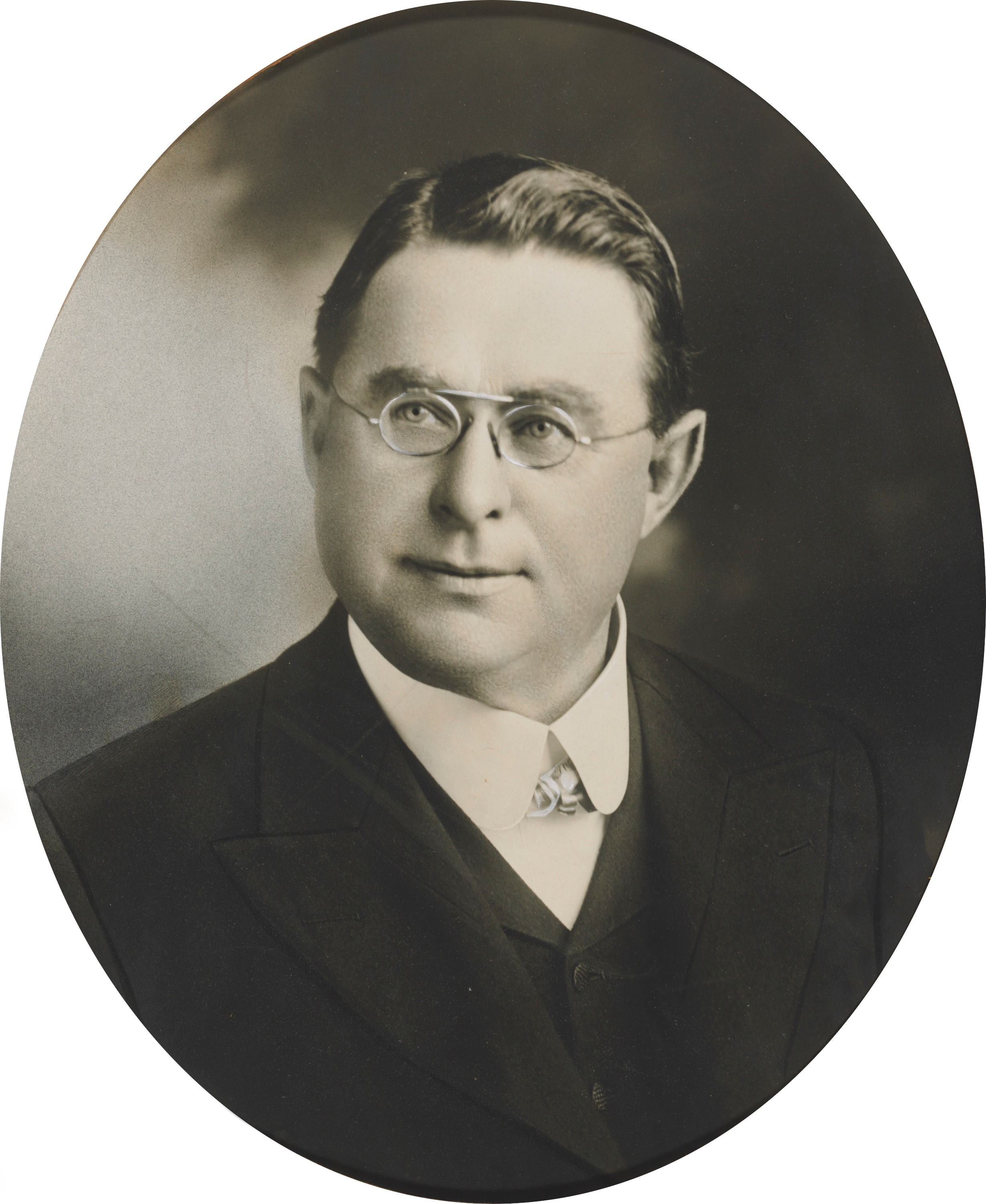

Treasurer of New South Wales
- In office 14 October 1910 – 11 April 1912
- Premier: James McGowen
- Preceded by: James McGowen
- Succeeded by: Campbell Carmichael

Member of the NSW Legislative Assembly for Botany
- In office 24 July 1895 – 16 July 1904
- Preceded by: William Stephen
- Succeeded by: Rowland Anderson

Member of the NSW Legislative Assembly for Alexandria
- In office 6 August 1904 – 11 April 1912
- Preceded by: New district
- Succeeded by: Simon Hickey

Personal details
- Born: John Rowland Dacey; 1 June 1854 Cork, Ireland
- Died: 11 April 1912 (aged 57) Sydney, Australia
- Resting place: Catholic section of Botany Cemetery
- Party: NSW Labor Party
- Spouse: Martha Ellen Douglass
- Children: 4 sons and 6 daughters
- Parents: Thomas Dacey (father); Margaret Dacey (mother)

John Rowland Dacey (1 June 1854 – 11 April 1912) was an Irish-born Australian politician. He moved to Victoria, Australia, with his mother after his father died. Eventually orphaned, Dacey moved to Sydney with his wife and began working as a coachmaker. He began his involvement in politics with an election to local council then moved to the New South Wales Legislative Assembly from 24 June 1895 to his death on 11 April 1912, serving as Treasurer in his final two years.

Throughout his parliamentary career, Dacey campaigned for a garden suburb which would provide government-owned, low-cost housing to the working class. After his death, the garden suburb of Daceyville was built in Sydney and named in honour of him.

== Early life ==
John Dacey was born on 1 June 1854 in Cork, Ireland, to Thomas Dacey, a barrister, and Margaret (née Jamson). After his father died, Dacey and his mother moved to Kyneton, Victoria in 1858. He was adopted by one Dr Smith in 1859 after his mother died. Following Dr Smith's death in 1866, he worked as a butcher's assistant. Dacey also worked as an agricultural blacksmith and managed a branch of May and Miller in Victoria.

Dacey married Martha Ellen Douglass on 27 July 1878 at St John's Church, Horsham, Victoria. In 1883, Dacey worked as a coachmaker and established Dacey & Co. in Alexandria, Sydney. By 1901 he was helping to organise the Wool and Basil Workers' Federation of Australia in Sydney and served as the Union's Secretary until his death.

== Political involvement ==
Dacey's involvement in politics began when he was elected to the Alexandria Municipal Council. He served on the council for ten years from 1886 to 1896 and as the mayor in 1888 and 1889. Dacey began his involvement in state politics as the Returning Officer for the district of Redfern from 1889 to 1891. He joined the Redfern Labor Electoral League, the local branch of the Labor Electoral League of New South Wales, in 1891, but was defeated for pre-selection by James McGowen, who would later serve as Premier and appoint Dacey to the cabinet.

A Roman Catholic, Dacey was influenced in his political opinions by protectionism and the rerum novarum, which supported people's right to join trade unions. He combined these beliefs with his experience with the Wool and Basil Workers Union and the Labor platform. He was an anti-billite, meaning that he was against Federation, and spoke against it, for example at Coraki, New South Wales on 15 June 1899, based on his opposition to free trade.

Dacey campaigned for the district of Botany in 1894 and lost to the free trade supporter William Stephen. Dacey was successful in the 1895 election, defeating Stephen for the seat. In the 1904 state election, Dacey was elected to the new district of Alexandria following an electoral redistribution. He was succeeded in the district of Botany by Rowland Anderson from the Liberal Reform Party.

Dacey became a senior party figure in the late 1890s and began to work on political strategy to win support in suburban seats and from white-collar voters. He stood in opposition to his party's support for the Premiership of Sir George Reid and instead threatened to resign if the party did not switch its support to William Lyne's Protectionist Party. At a Labor Party conference in 1899, the party executive decided to put forward the protectionism/free trade debate to a referendum of all party members, despite Dacey's campaigning. Dacey's standing in the Labor Party continued to grow: he was the party's treasurer from 1901 to 1910 and on the Party Central Executive in 1912.

Labor won the 1910 state election and, while Dacey was not given a cabinet position in Labor's first cabinet, he did gain positions in the second and third arrangement of McGowen's ministry; firstly, on 10 November 1911, as a minister without portfolio following two resignations and then, shortly after, on 27 November, as the Treasurer of New South Wales.

== Death and legacy ==
Dacey died of chronic nephritis while serving as the Colonial Treasurer and was granted a state funeral, which took place in St Brigid's Church in Marrickville, New South Wales and was well attended; a contemporary newspaper reported that along "the entire route of the procession, the footpaths were thick with people."

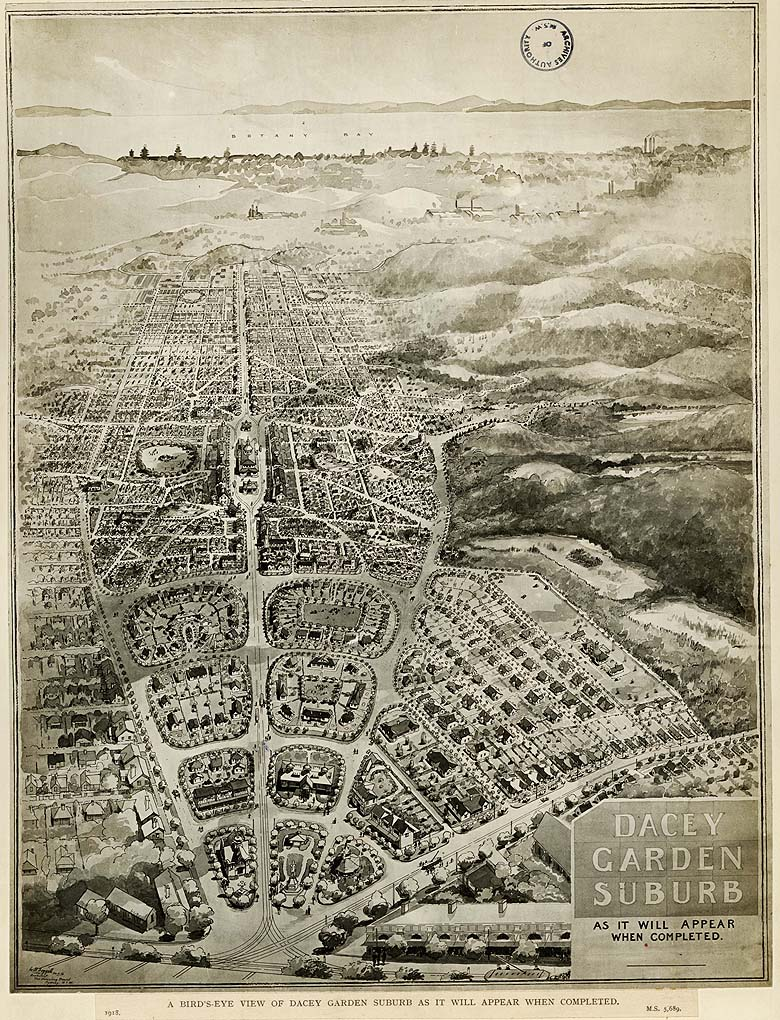
A bird's-eye view of Dacey's Garden Suburb (1918)

Dacey had campaigned for the government to provide low-cost housing to the working class from the 1890s to his death; he stated that "the time has come when we should create a Garden City and provide houses of an up-to-date character at the lowest possible rental". His plans were based on the garden city movement, in particular to be modelled on the garden city of Letchworth in Hertfordshire, England. After his death, his plans were partially implemented by the Holman ministries from 1913 to 1920 in Southern Sydney. Daceyville, named in honour of John Dacey, was Australia's first public housing estate and included Australia's first cul-de-sac.

A suburb adjacent to his electorate was created and named after him, Daceyville. A recreational park area was also created, Rowland Park.

Parliament of New South Wales
Political offices
Preceded by James McGowen	Treasurer of New South Wales; 1910–1912	Succeeded by Campbell Carmichael
New South Wales Legislative Assembly
Preceded by William Stephen	Member for Botany; 1895 – 1904	Succeeded by Rowland Anderson
New district	Member for Alexandria; 1904 – 1912	Succeeded by Simon Hickey
Civic offices
Preceded by Stephen Foskett	Mayor of Alexandria; 1888 – 1890	Succeeded by John Turner
