= Leitch =

Leitch (/liːtʃ/ LEETCH) is a Scottish surname. Notable people with the surname include:

- Alfred Alexander Leitch (1894–1954), Canadian military pilot
- Archibald Leitch (1865–1939), Scottish architect
- Barry Leitch (born 1970), Scottish video game music composer
- Bill Leitch, Canadian curler; see List of teams on the 2011–12 World Curling Tour
- Billy Leitch (1895–1963), Irish footballer
- Brendon Leitch (born 1999), New Zealand racing driver
- Cecil Leitch (1891–1977), English golfer
- Damon Leitch (born 1992), New Zealand racing driver
- David Leitch (director) (born 1975), American director and stuntman
- David Leitch (politician) (1923–1988), Australian politician
- David Leitch (settler) (1753–1794), founder of Leitch's Station, Kentucky
- David R. Leitch (born 1948), American politician
- Donovan Leitch, known as Donovan, Scottish musician
- Donovan Leitch, Jr. (born 1967), actor and the son of the above
- Duncan Leitch (geologist) (1904–1956), Scottish geologist and palaeontologist
- Duncan Leitch (minister) (1903–1974), Scottish minister
- Duncan Leitch (neurobiologist) (born 1984), American neurobiologist
- George Leitch (died 1907), English actor-manager and dramatist in Australia
- Harry Leitch (born 1985), Scottish squash player
- Ione Skye Leitch, known as Ione Skye, actress and daughter of Donovan Leitch
- Jason Leitch (born 1968), National Clinical Director of Healthcare Quality and Strategy for the Scottish Government
- Kellie Leitch (born 1970) Canadian politician
- Maurice Leitch (1933–2023), writer
- Michael Leitch (born 1988), Japanese rugby union player
- Peter Leitch (disambiguation), several people:

- Sir Peter Leitch (businessman) (born 1944), New Zealand businessman nicknamed "The Mad Butcher"
- Peter Leitch (musician) (born 1944), Canadian jazz guitarist
- Peter Leitch (VC) (1820–1892), Scottish soldier who received the Victoria Cross

- Ronnie Leitch (1953–2018), Sri Lankan Burgher actor, vocalist, and comedian
- Scott Leitch (born 1969), Scottish football player and manager
- Thomas Leitch (born 1951), American philosopher, academic, and film scholar
- Will Leitch, American writer
- Will Leitch (Northern Irish journalist)
- William Leitch (disambiguation), several people
- William Leitch (footballer) (1863–1943), Tasmanian footballer, businessman and sports administrator
- William Leitch (scientist) (1814–1864), Scottish astronomer and rocket visionary
- William T. Leitch (1808–1885), mayor of Madison, Wisconsin, 1862–1865
- William Leighton Leitch (1804–1883), Scottish landscape watercolour painter and illustrator

== See also ==
- Leitch Technology, Canadian technology company
