= Electoral results for the district of Phillip =

Election results for Phillip, New South Wales, Australia

Phillip, an electoral district of the Legislative Assembly in the Australian state of New South Wales, had two incarnations, from 1904 to 1920 and from 1927 to 1981.

Election	Member	Party
1904	Phillip Sullivan	Labour
1907	Richard Meagher	Independent
1910	Richard Meagher	Labor
1913	Richard Meagher	Labor / Independent Labor
1917	John Doyle	Labor
Election	Member	Party
1927	Michael Burke	Labor
1930	Tom Shannon	Labor
1932	Tom Shannon	Labor (NSW)
1935	Tom Shannon	Labor (NSW)
1938	Tom Shannon	Labor / Labor (N-C)
1941	Tom Shannon	Labor
1944	Tom Shannon	Labor
1947	Tom Shannon	Labor
1950	Tom Shannon	Labor
1953	Tom Shannon	Labor
1954 by	Pat Hills	Labor
1956	Pat Hills	Labor
1959	Pat Hills	Labor
1962	Pat Hills	Labor
1965	Pat Hills	Labor
1968	Pat Hills	Labor
1972	Pat Hills	Labor
1975	Pat Hills	Labor
1978	Pat Hills	Labor

== Election results ==
=== Elections in the 1970s ===
==== 1978 ====
1978 New South Wales state election: Phillip
Party	Candidate	Votes	%	±%
Labor	Pat Hills	18,450	72.4	+2.9
Liberal	Philip Daley	4,873	19.1	−3.5
Communist	Judy Mundey	1,262	5.0	−0.7
Socialist Workers	Gordon Adler	895	3.5	+1.3
Total formal votes		25,480	96.1	−0.8
Informal votes		1,043	3.9	+0.8
Turnout		26,523	85.2	+0.8
Two-party-preferred result
Labor	Pat Hills	20,320	79.7	+3.7
Liberal	Philip Daley	5,160	20.3	−3.7
Labor hold		Swing	+3.7	

==== 1976 ====
1976 New South Wales state election: Phillip
Party	Candidate	Votes	%	±%
Labor	Pat Hills	18,732	69.5	+4.0
Liberal	Peter Starr	6,086	22.6	+4.4
Communist	Judy Mundey	1,540	5.7	+2.4
Socialist Workers	Deborah Shnookal	594	2.2	+2.2
Total formal votes		26,952	96.9	+2.6
Informal votes		864	3.1	−2.6
Turnout		27,816	84.4	+0.5
Two-party-preferred result
Labor	Pat Hills	20,472	76.0	+1.1
Liberal	Peter Starr	6,480	24.0	−1.1
Labor hold		Swing	+1.1	

==== 1973 ====
1973 New South Wales state election: Phillip
Party	Candidate	Votes	%	±%
Labor	Pat Hills	16,523	65.5	−6.6
Liberal	Walter O'Donoghue	4,594	18.2	−1.3
Australia	Jennifer Baker	1,831	7.3	+7.3
Democratic Labor	Kristina Aster-Stater	1,007	4.0	−4.4
Communist	Joseph Owens	838	3.3	+3.3
Independent	John Hawkins	436	1.7	+1.7
Total formal votes		25,229	94.3	
Informal votes		1,514	5.7	
Turnout		26,743	83.9	
Two-party-preferred result
Labor	Pat Hills	18,900	74.9	+1.1
Liberal	Walter O'Donoghue	6,329	25.1	−1.1
Labor hold		Swing	+1.1	

==== 1971 ====
1971 New South Wales state election: Phillip
Party	Candidate	Votes	%	±%
Labor	Pat Hills	16,904	72.1	+3.3
Liberal	Ronald Hack	4,567	19.5	−3.9
Democratic Labor	John Fox	1,974	8.4	+0.6
Total formal votes		23,445	96.0	
Informal votes		973	4.0	
Turnout		24,418	88.0	
Two-party-preferred result
Labor	Pat Hills	17,299	73.8	+3.4
Liberal	Ronald Hack	6,146	26.2	−3.4
Labor hold		Swing	+3.4	

=== Elections in the 1960s ===
==== 1968 ====
1968 New South Wales state election: Phillip
Party	Candidate	Votes	%	±%
Labor	Pat Hills	16,829	68.8	+10.1
Liberal	Terence Tomlin	5,726	23.4	−8.8
Democratic Labor	Doris Brown	1,901	7.8	+7.8
Total formal votes		24,458	95.3	
Informal votes		1,194	4.7	
Turnout		25,650	90.0	
Two-party-preferred result
Labor	Pat Hills	17,209	70.4	−2.5
Liberal	Terence Tomlin	7,247	29.6	+2.5
Labor hold		Swing	−2.5	

==== 1965 ====
1965 New South Wales state election: Phillip
Party	Candidate	Votes	%	±%
Labor	Pat Hills	12,392	58.7	−9.7
Liberal	Kenneth McKimm	6,794	32.2	+5.8
Communist	Walter Buckley	1,570	7.4	+2.1
Independent	John Walsh	360	1.7	+1.7
Total formal votes		21,116	96.1	−0.8
Informal votes		848	3.9	+0.8
Turnout		21,964	89.3	−0.1
Two-party-preferred result
Labor	Pat Hills	13,828	65.5	−7.1
Liberal	Kenneth McKimm	7,288	34.5	+7.1
Labor hold		Swing	−7.1	

==== 1962 ====
1962 New South Wales state election: Phillip
Party	Candidate	Votes	%	±%
Labor	Pat Hills	15,665	68.4	+3.0
Liberal	Jean Wood	6,040	26.4	−2.4
Communist	Joy Williams	1,212	5.3	−0.4
Total formal votes		22,917	96.9	
Informal votes		741	3.1	
Turnout		23,658	89.4	
Two-party-preferred result
Labor	Pat Hills	16,635	72.6	+2.8
Liberal	Jean Wood	6,282	27.4	−2.8
Labor hold		Swing	+2.8	

=== Elections in the 1950s ===
==== 1959 ====
1959 New South Wales state election: Phillip
Party	Candidate	Votes	%	±%
Labor	Pat Hills	15,487	69.4	
Liberal	Warwick Dunkley	5,539	24.8	
Communist	Ernie Thornton	1,276	5.7	
Total formal votes		22,302	96.7	
Informal votes		771	3.3	
Turnout		23,073	89.0	
Two-party-preferred result
Labor	Pat Hills	16,508	74.0	
Liberal	Warwick Dunkley	5,794	26.0	
Labor hold		Swing		

==== 1956 ====
1956 New South Wales state election: Phillip
Party	Candidate	Votes	%	±%
Labor	Pat Hills	14,287	75.6	−24.4
Lang Labor	Francis Mohan	3,197	16.9	+16.9
Communist	Robert Webster	1,407	7.5	+7.5
Total formal votes		18,791	95.8	
Informal votes		832	4.2	
Turnout		19,723	92.0	
Two-candidate-preferred result
Labor	Pat Hills	15,342	81.2	−18.8
Lang Labor	Francis Mohan	3,549	18.8	+18.8
Labor hold		Swing	N/A	

==== 1954 by-election ====
1954 Phillip by-election Saturday 14 August
Party	Candidate	Votes	%	±%
Labor	Pat Hills	11,450	73.3	
Independent	Wal Campbell	4,164	26.7	
Total formal votes		15,614	97.6	
Informal votes		392	2.4	
Turnout		16,006	69.1	
Labor hold		Swing	N/A	

Tom Shannon (Labor) died.

==== 1953 ====
1953 New South Wales state election: Phillip
Party	Candidate	Votes	%	±%
Labor	Tom Shannon	unopposed		
Labor hold				

==== 1950 ====
1950 New South Wales state election: Phillip
Party	Candidate	Votes	%	±%
Labor	Tom Shannon	15,390	78.7	
Liberal	Henry Clarke	4,161	21.3	
Total formal votes		19,551	97.2	
Informal votes		566	2.8	
Turnout		20,117	89.3	
Labor hold		Swing		

=== Elections in the 1940s ===
==== 1947 ====
1947 New South Wales state election: Phillip
Party	Candidate	Votes	%	±%
Labor	Tom Shannon	12,040	62.2	+2.9
Lang Labor	Michael Moore	3,586	18.5	−22.2
Independent	Henry Dixon	2,161	11.2	+11.2
Communist	Thomas Payne	1,580	8.2	+8.2
Total formal votes		19,367	95.5	+0.9
Informal votes		902	4.5	−0.9
Turnout		20,269	91.9	+3.3
Labor hold		Swing	N/A	

- Preferences were not distributed.

==== 1944 ====
1944 New South Wales state election: Phillip
Party	Candidate	Votes	%	±%
Labor	Tom Shannon	10,198	59.3	−14.0
Lang Labor	Les Dorney	7,008	40.7	+40.7
Total formal votes		17,206	94.6	−0.6
Informal votes		988	5.4	+0.6
Turnout		18,194	88.6	+1.0
Labor hold		Swing	N/A	

==== 1941 ====
1941 New South Wales state election: Phillip
Party	Candidate	Votes	%	±%
Labor	Tom Shannon	12,689	73.3	
Independent	Diana Gould	2,347	13.5	
State Labor	Tom Morey	2,279	13.2	
Total formal votes		17,315	95.2	
Informal votes		870	4.8	
Turnout		18,185	87.6	
Labor hold		Swing		

- Preferences were not distributed.

=== Elections in the 1930s ===
==== 1938 ====
1938 New South Wales state election: Phillip
Party	Candidate	Votes	%	±%
Labor	Tom Shannon	unopposed		
Labor hold				

==== 1935 ====
1935 New South Wales state election: Phillip
Party	Candidate	Votes	%	±%
Labor (NSW)	Tom Shannon	unopposed		
Labor (NSW) hold				

==== 1932 ====
1932 New South Wales state election: Phillip
Party	Candidate	Votes	%	±%
Labor (NSW)	Tom Shannon	10,708	70.5	−12.7
United Australia	William Adkins	3,347	22.0	+7.2
Federal Labor	Ronald Wyllie	786	5.2	+5.2
Communist	Edward Docker	354	2.3	+0.3
Total formal votes		15,195	96.3	−1.1
Informal votes		585	3.7	+1.1
Turnout		15,780	93.3	+2.2
Labor (NSW) hold		Swing	N/A	

- Preferences were not distributed.

==== 1930 ====
1930 New South Wales state election: Phillip
Party	Candidate	Votes	%	±%
Labor	Tom Shannon	12,152	83.2	
Nationalist	William Adkins	2,167	14.8	
Communist	Edwin Hill	296	2.0	
Total formal votes		14,615	97.4	
Informal votes		397	2.6	
Turnout		15,012	91.1	
Labor hold		Swing		

=== Elections in the 1920s ===
==== 1927 ====
1927 New South Wales state election: Phillip
Party	Candidate	Votes	%	±%
Labor	Michael Burke	8,645	79.3	
Nationalist	William Weller	2,111	19.4	
Independent	Mary Grayndler	147	1.4	
Total formal votes		10,903	98.4	
Informal votes		181	1.6	
Turnout		11,084	75.0	
Labor win		(new seat)		

District re-created

==== 1920 - 1927 ====
District abolished District abolished

=== Elections in the 1910s ===
==== 1917 ====
1917 New South Wales state election: Phillip
Party	Candidate	Votes	%	±%
Labor	John Doyle	3,913	65.2	−18.1
Independent Labor	Richard Meagher	2,056	34.3	+34.3
Ind. Socialist Labor	James Slade	31	0.5	+0.5
Total formal votes		6,000	98.9	+1.4
Informal votes		66	1.1	−1.4
Turnout		6,066	61.4	+4.5
Labor hold		Swing	−18.1	

The sitting member Richard Meagher was expelled from Labor in the November 1916 Labor split over conscription.

==== 1913 ====
1913 New South Wales state election: Phillip
Party	Candidate	Votes	%	±%
Labor	Richard Meagher	4,755	83.3	
Liberal Reform	Eden George	954	16.7	
Total formal votes		5,709	97.5	
Informal votes		145	2.5	
Turnout		5,854	56.9	
Labor hold				

==== 1910 ====
1910 New South Wales state election: Phillip
Party	Candidate	Votes	%	±%
Labour	Richard Meagher	4,108	76.1	+33.5
Liberal Reform	Henry Manning	1,236	22.9	−5.8
Independent	William Leonard	51	0.9	
Total formal votes		5,395	97.1	+0.2
Informal votes		163	2.9	+0.2
Turnout		5,558	65.6	−6.9
Member changed to Labour from Independent				

=== Elections in the 1900s ===
==== 1907 ====
1907 New South Wales state election: Phillip
Party	Candidate	Votes	%	±%
Independent	Richard Meagher	2,578	42.6	
Liberal Reform	John Garland	1,735	28.7	
Labour	Phillip Sullivan	1,735	28.7	
Total formal votes		6,048	97.3	
Informal votes		170	2.7	
Turnout		6,218	72.5	
Independent gain from Labour				

==== 1904 ====
1904 New South Wales state election: Phillip
Party	Candidate	Votes	%	±%
Labour	Phillip Sullivan	2,977	56.2	
Liberal Reform	Francis Boyce	2,120	40.0	
Independent Liberal	Samuel Wolfe	176	3.3	
Socialist Labor	Francis Drake	18	0.3	
Total formal votes		5,298	98.9	
Informal votes		59	1.1	
Turnout		5,357	59.1	
Labour win		(new seat)		

Phillip was a new seat and consisted of parts of the abolished seats of Sydney-Phillip and Darlington. The member for Darlington was Phillip Sullivan (Labour). The member for Sydney-Phillip was Daniel O'Connor (Progressive) who did not contest the election.
