= List of mayors of Redfern =

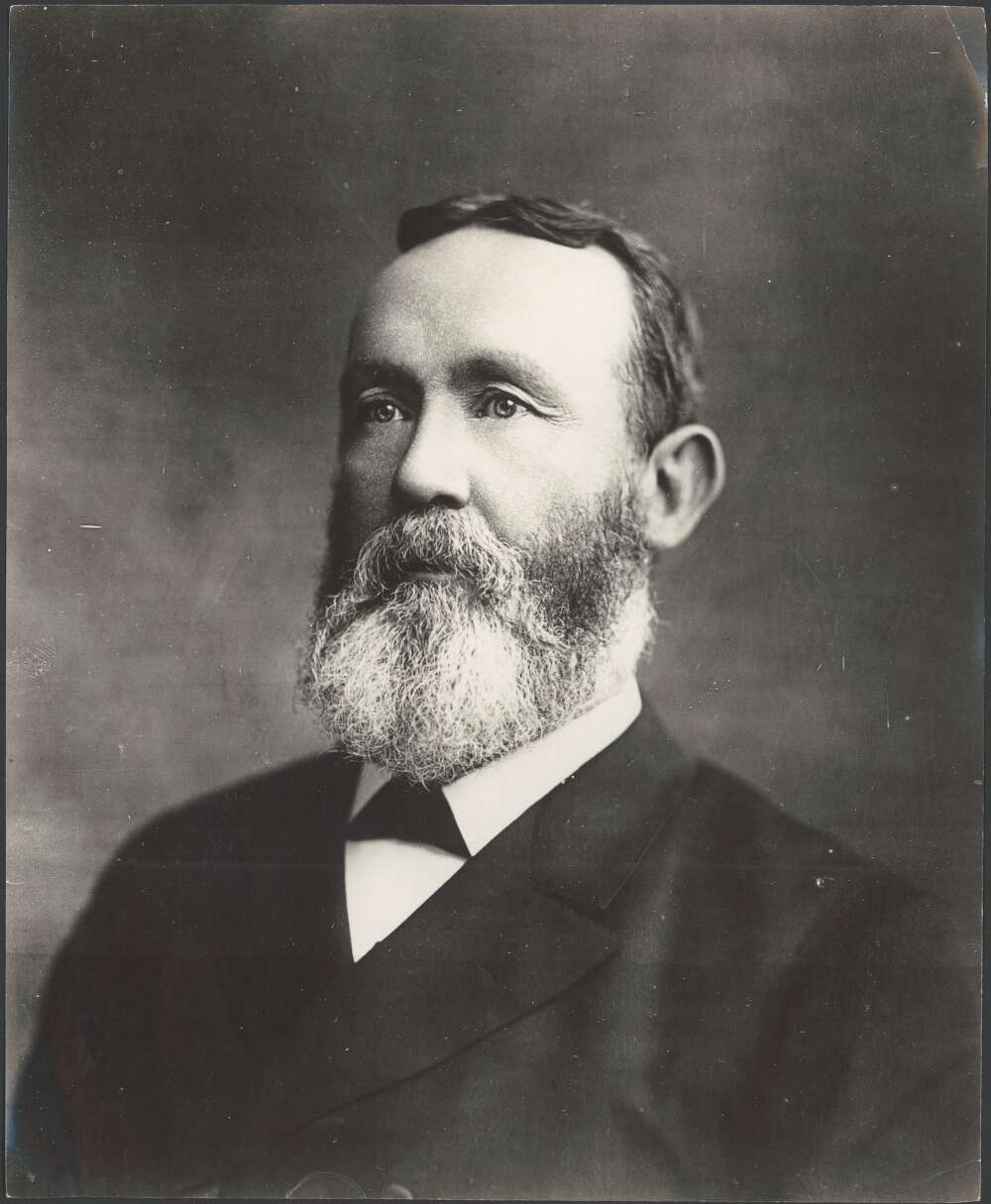
Francis Augustus Wright Mayor 1882–1884

Thomas Clarke (1846–1922), Mayor (1890–1891, 1898–1900) and Member of Parliament for Darlington (1898–1901).

John Beveridge (1848–1916), Alderman for Belmore Ward (1886–1891) and Mayor (1891).

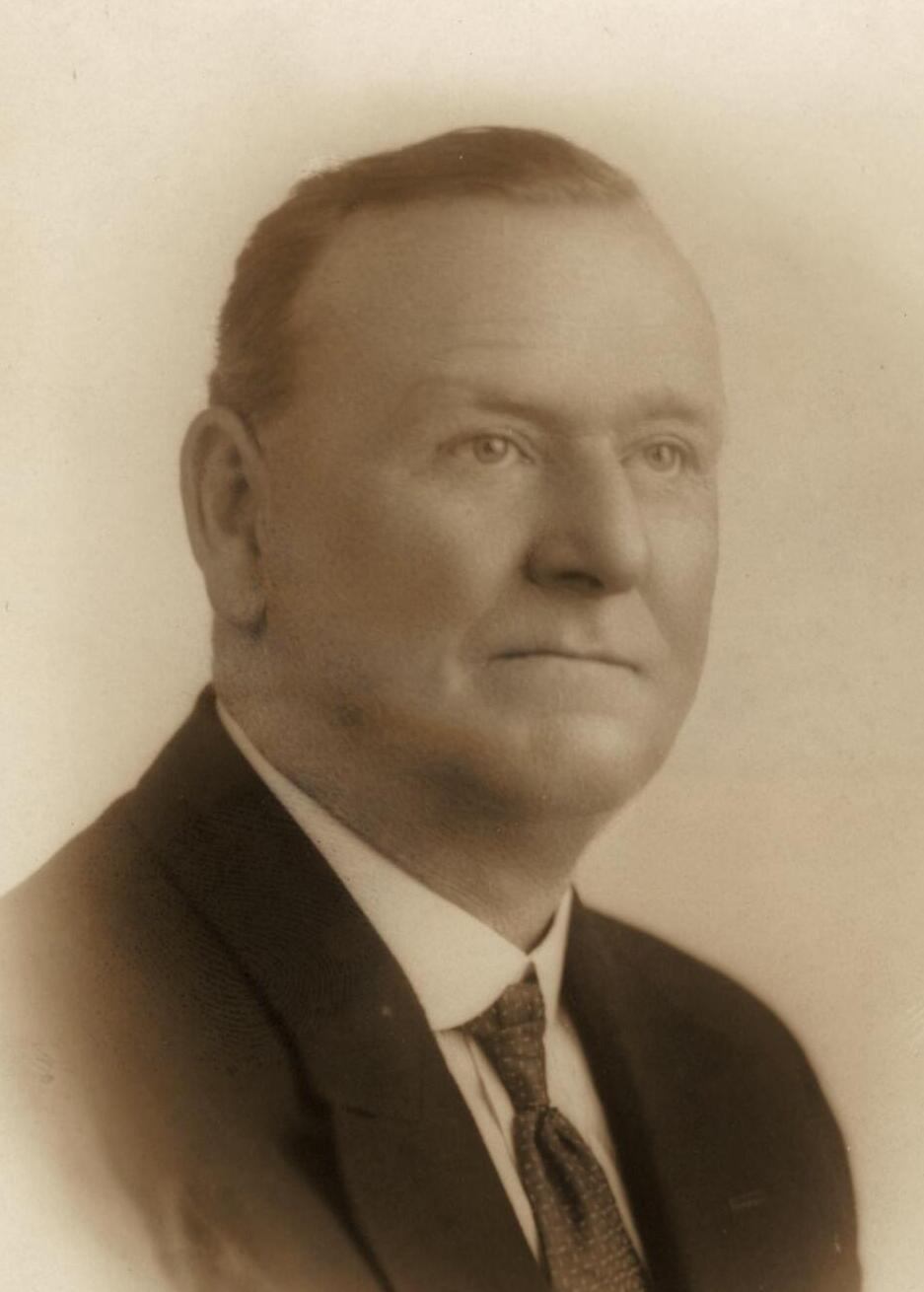
Patrick Mooney (1880–1942), Mayor (1925) and Senator for New South Wales (1931–1932).

This is a list of Chairmen and Mayors of the Municipality of Redfern.

== List of mayors ==
| # | Portrait | Officeholder | Party | Term | | | Office | Notes |
| # | Portrait | Officeholder | Party | Took Office | Left Office | Tenure | Office | Notes |
|---|---|---|---|---|---|---|---|---|
| 1 | | Thomas Hayes | | 14 September 1859 | 1 June 1861 | 1 year, 260 days | Chairman | |
| 2 | | Michael Williamson | | 1 June 1861 | 5 February 1862 | 249 days | Chairman | |
| 3 | | George Renwick | | 5 February 1862 | 5 February 1864 | 2 years, 0 days | Chairman | |
| 4 | | Thomas Jones | | 5 February 1864 | 10 February 1865 | 1 year, 5 days | Chairman | |
| 5 | | Thomas Wild | | 10 February 1865 | 9 February 1866 | 364 days | Chairman | |
| 6 | | William Williamson | | 9 February 1866 | 7 February 1867 | 363 days | Chairman | |
| (3) | | George Renwick | | 7 February 1867 | 13 February 1868 | 1 year, 6 days | Chairman | |
| (3) | | George Renwick | | 13 February 1868 | 16 February 1872 | 4 years, 3 days | Mayor | |
| 7 | | Henry Hudson | | 16 February 1872 | 11 February 1874 | 1 year, 360 days | Mayor | |
| (6) | | William Williamson | | 11 February 1874 | 8 February 1876 | 1 year, 362 days | Mayor | |
| 8 | | Patrick Stanley | | 8 February 1876 | 11 February 1880 | 4 years, 3 days | Mayor | |
| (7) | | Henry Hudson | | 11 February 1880 | 9 February 1881 | 364 days | Mayor | |
| (8) | | Patrick Stanley | | 9 February 1881 | 10 February 1882 | 1 year, 1 day | Mayor | |
| 9 | | Francis Augustus Wright | | 10 February 1882 | 16 February 1885 | 3 years, 6 days | Mayor | |
| 10 | | George Lander | | 16 February 1885 | 3 February 1887 | 1 year, 352 days | Mayor | |
| 11 | | Edwin Berry | | 3 February 1887 | 10 February 1888 | 1 year, 7 days | Mayor | |
| 12 | | Thomas Williamson | | 10 February 1888 | 14 February 1889 | 1 year, 4 days | Mayor | |
| 13 | | John Crowe | | 14 February 1889 | 13 February 1890 | 364 days | Mayor | |
| 14 | | Thomas Clarke | | 13 February 1890 | 12 February 1891 | 364 days | Mayor | |
| 15 | | John Beveridge | | 12 February 1891 | 29 May 1891 | 106 days | Mayor | |
| 16 | | George William Howe | | 2 June 1891 | 17 February 1893 | 1 year, 260 days | Mayor | |
| 17 | | Cornelius Gorton | | 17 February 1893 | 15 February 1894 | 363 days | Mayor | |
| 18 | | William Davis | | 15 February 1894 | 15 February 1895 | 1 year, 0 days | Mayor | |
| 19 | | William Poole | | 15 February 1895 | 13 February 1896 | 363 days | Mayor | |
| 20 | | George Richard Parkes | | 13 February 1896 | 11 February 1897 | 364 days | Mayor | |
| 21 | | Joseph Medcalf | | 11 February 1897 | 8 February 1898 | 362 days | Mayor | |
| (11) | | Edwin Berry | | 8 February 1898 | 13 October 1898 | 247 days | Mayor | |
| (14) | | Thomas Clarke | | 13 October 1898 | 7 February 1900 | 1 year, 117 days | Mayor | |
| 22 | | Henry Vernon | | 7 February 1900 | 14 February 1901 | 1 year, 7 days | Mayor | |
| 23 | | James Jackson | | 14 February 1901 | 12 February 1902 | 363 days | Mayor | |
| 24 | | Thomas Fanning | | 12 February 1902 | 12 February 1903 | 1 year, 0 days | Mayor | |
| (20) | | George Richard Parkes | | 12 February 1903 | 13 February 1904 | 1 year, 0 days | Mayor | |
| (21) | | Joseph Medcalf | | 13 February 1904 | 17 February 1905 | 1 year, 5 days | Mayor | |
| (17) | | Cornelius Gorton | | 17 February 1905 | 16 February 1906 | 364 days | Mayor | |
| 25 | | James Owen Batchelor | | 16 February 1906 | 15 February 1907 | 364 days | Mayor | |
| 26 | | George Todd | | 15 February 1907 | 7 February 1908 | 357 days | Mayor | |
| 27 | | John Leitch | Labor | 7 February 1908 | 2 February 1911 | 2 years, 360 days | Mayor | |
| 28 | | Tom Holden | Labor | 2 February 1911 | 11 February 1914 | 3 years, 9 days | Mayor | |
| (27) | | John Leitch | Labor | 11 February 1914 | 4 February 1915 | 358 days | Mayor | |
| (28) | | Tom Holden | Labor | 4 February 1915 | 12 July 1917 | 2 years, 158 days | Mayor | |
| 29 | | Albert Clarke Isaacs | | 12 July 1917 | 5 February 1920 | 2 years, 208 days | Mayor | |
| 30 | | Patrick Roberts | Labor | 5 February 1920 | 6 December 1922 | 2 years, 304 days | Mayor | |
| 31 | | John Joseph Castle | Labor | 6 December 1922 | 20 December 1923 | 1 year, 14 days | Mayor | |
| 32 | | George Boyd | Labor | 20 December 1923 | 16 December 1924 | 362 days | Mayor | |
| 33 | | Patrick Mooney | Labor | 16 December 1924 | 23 December 1926 | 2 years, 7 days | Mayor | |
| (28) | | Tom Holden | Labor | 23 December 1926 | 23 December 1927 | 1 year, 0 days | Mayor | |
| 34 | | Francis James Gilmore | | 23 December 1927 | 12 December 1928 | 355 days | Mayor | |
| 35 | | John Hanafin | | 12 December 1928 | 19 December 1929 | 1 year, 7 days | Mayor | |
| 36 | | George Waite | Labor | 19 December 1929 | 18 December 1930 | 364 days | Mayor | |
| 37 | | Kenneth John Alexander MacRae | Labor | 18 December 1930 | 7 January 1932 | 1 year, 20 days | Mayor | |
| 38 | | George Wheatley | Labor | 7 January 1932 | 15 December 1932 | 343 days | Mayor | |
| (31) | | John Joseph Castle | Labor | 15 December 1932 | 31 December 1934 | 2 years, 16 days | Mayor | |
| 39 | | Harry Gardiner | Labor | 31 December 1934 | 10 January 1936 | 1 year, 10 days | Mayor | |
| 40 | | Joseph Malachi Gilmore | | 10 January 1936 | 8 January 1937 | 364 days | Mayor | |
| 41 | | Alexis Howarth | | 8 January 1937 | 23 December 1937 | 349 days | Mayor | |
| (34) | | Francis James Gilmore | | 23 December 1937 | 21 December 1939 | 1 year, 363 days | Mayor | |
| 42 | | James Francis Edward Gilmore | | 21 December 1939 | 11 December 1941 | 1 year, 355 days | Mayor | |
| 43 | | John Stephen O’Brien | | 11 December 1941 | 23 December 1943 | 2 years, 12 days | Mayor | |
| 44 | | Thomas Ormond Powell | | 23 December 1943 | 13 December 1944 | 356 days | Mayor | |
| 45 | | Edward Robert Elvy | | 13 December 1944 | 10 January 1946 | 1 year, 28 days | Mayor | |
| 46 | | Joseph Warburton | | 10 January 1946 | 18 December 1946 | 342 days | Mayor | |
| (41) | | Alexis Howarth | | 18 December 1946 | 31 December 1948 | 2 years, 13 days | Mayor | |
