= Electoral results for the district of Darlington =

Election result for Darlington, New South Wales, Australia

Darlington, an electoral district of the Legislative Assembly in the Australian state of New South Wales was created in 1894 and abolished in 1904.

Election	Member	Party
1894	William Schey	Independent Labour
1895	William Schey	Protectionist
1898	Thomas Clarke	Free Trade
1901	Phillip Sullivan	Labour

== Election results ==
=== Elections in the 1900s ===
==== 1901 ====
1901 New South Wales state election: Darlington
Party	Candidate	Votes	%	±%
Labour	Phillip Sullivan	1,194	51.9	
Liberal Reform	Thomas Clarke	1,074	46.7	1.3
Socialist Labor	John Neill	33	1.4	
Total formal votes		2,301	99.3	−0.1
Informal votes		17	0.7	+0.1
Turnout		2,318	64.5	+3.6
Labour gain from Liberal Reform				

=== Elections in the 1890s ===
==== 1898 ====
1898 New South Wales colonial election: Darlington
Party	Candidate	Votes	%	±%
Free Trade	Thomas Clarke	966	50.6	
National Federal	William Schey	874	45.8	
Ind. Free Trade	William Hall	58	3.0	
Independent Federalist	Michael Keating	8	0.4	
Independent	James Jones	3	0.2	
Total formal votes		1,909	99.4	
Informal votes		11	0.6	
Turnout		1,920	60.9	
Free Trade gain from National Federal				

==== 1895 ====
1895 New South Wales colonial election: Darlington
Party	Candidate	Votes	%	±%
Protectionist	William Schey	758	47.4	
Free Trade	Thomas Clarke	700	43.8	
Labour	Robert Harris	140	8.8	
Total formal votes		1,598	99.3	
Informal votes		12	0.8	
Turnout		1,610	62.6	
Member changed to Protectionist from Independent Labour				

==== 1894 ====
1894 New South Wales colonial election: Darlington
Party	Candidate	Votes	%	±%
Independent Labour	William Schey	844	39.1	
Free Trade	William Manuell	771	35.7	
Protectionist	David Davis	544	25.2	
Total formal votes		2,159	98.8	
Informal votes		27	1.2	
Turnout		2,186	85.2	
Independent Labour win		(new seat)		
