= William Leitch =

William Leitch or Will Leitch or Bill Leitch may refer to:

- William Leitch (footballer) (1863–1943), Tasmanian footballer, businessman and sports administrator
- William Leitch (scientist) (1814-1864), Scottish astronomer and rocket visionary
- William Leighton Leitch (1804–1883), Scottish landscape watercolour painter and illustrator
- William T. Leitch (1808–1885), mayor of Madison, Wisconsin, 1862–1865
- Will Leitch founding editor of the Gawker Media sports blog Deadspin
- Will Leitch (Northern Irish journalist)
- Bill Leitch, Canadian curler List of teams on the 2011–12 World Curling Tour
