= 1954 Phillip state by-election =

Election result for Phillip, New South Wales, Australia

A by-election was held for the New South Wales Legislative Assembly electorate of Phillip on 14 August 1954 because of the death of Tom Shannon (Labor).

== Dates ==
Date	Event
9 June 1954	Tom Shannon died.
15 July 1954	Writ of election issued by the Speaker of the Legislative Assembly.
22 July 1954	Day of nomination
14 August 1954	Polling day
10 September 1954	Return of writ

== Candidates ==
- Wal Campbell (Independent) was the proprietor and editor of The Rock, an anti-catholic paper. He stated that his policies would be similar to Labor, however he was opposed to sectarianism in the party. This was the only time he was a candidate for the Legislative Assembly.
- Pat Hills (Labor) was a toolmaker, engineer and the Lord Mayor of Sydney.

== Result ==
1954 Phillip by-election Saturday 14 August
Party	Candidate	Votes	%	±%
Labor	Pat Hills	11,450	73.3	
Independent	Wal Campbell	4,164	26.7	
Total formal votes		15,614	97.6	
Informal votes		392	2.4	
Turnout		16,006	69.1	
Labor hold		Swing	N/A	

== See also ==
- Electoral results for the district of Phillip
- List of New South Wales state by-elections
