= Municipality of Redfern =

Former local government area in New South Wales, Australia

Coordinates: 33.8930°S 151.2054°W

- Local government area
- Redfern Town Hall, c. 1871, Mayor George Renwick is pictured at right on the balcony.
- Country: Australia
- State: New South Wales
- Established: 11 August 1859
- Abolished: 31 December 1948
- Council seat: Redfern Town Hall

Area
  - Total: 1.7 km^{2} (0.66 sq mi)

Population
  - Total: 18,637 (1947 census)
  - Density: 11,000/km^{2} (28,400/sq mi)
- Parish: Alexandria
LGAs around Municipality of Redfern
| Darlington | Sydney | Sydney |
| Newtown | Municipality of Redfern | Sydney |
| Erskineville | Alexandria | Waterloo |

The Municipality of Redfern was a local government area of Sydney, New South Wales, Australia. The small municipality was proclaimed in 1859 as one of the first municipalities proclaimed under the new provisions of the Municipalities Act, 1858, and was centred on the suburbs of Redfern, Eveleigh, Darlington and Surry Hills. The council was amalgamated, along with most of its neighbours, with the City of Sydney to the north with the passing of the Local Government (Areas) Act 1948. From 1968 to 1982 and from 1989 to 2004, the area was part of the South Sydney councils.

== Council history ==
When Redfern Municipality was proclaimed in August 1859, the area initially included the areas of Waterloo and Alexandria. However the Municipality of Waterloo was proclaimed in May 1860 and the Municipality of Alexandria separated from Waterloo in August 1868. Upon incorporation in 1859, the municipality was divided into three wards: Redfern, Waterloo and Surry Hills, each electing three Aldermen. With the secession of Waterloo a few months later the wards were rearranged to be Redfern, Belmore and Surry Hills and in 1880 Golden Grove Ward was added to that number. Under the enactment of The Municipalities Act of 1867, the title of 'Chairman' for the council was changed to be 'Mayor'. With this Act, the council also became known as the Borough of Redfern (From 28 December 1906, with the passing of the Local Government Act, 1906, the council was again renamed as the "Municipality of Redfern"). The Mayor had a set of official robes to wear as part of the office, but they were often boycotted by Labor mayors who affirmed they were against their 'democratic principles'.

Redfern was notable for being the first suburb in Sydney to have electricity and electric street lighting, which occurred when the Council voted unanimously in 1891 to build its own power station, in Turner Street, to power the suburb. From the late 1910s and 1920s the Redfern area became increasingly populated by the unemployed and working class, employed by industry and the nearby Eveleigh Railway Workshops, resulting in the increasing domination of the Labor Party and left-wing groups in the area. In 1947 the Communist Party of Australia succeeded in getting their first alderman, Patrick Levelle, elected to the council. As a consequence the council, traditionally held by the merchant and middle classes, frequently found itself divided on simple matters, including the election of the mayor, which required the Minister for Local Government and the Governor to instead appoint the mayor several times. This was a situation occurring within many of the inner-city councils as demographics of the area changed dramatically, but Redfern was considered the worst example of a council paralysed by party politics.

With the Redfern area's close involvement with the labor movement and the Labor Party, the wartime conscription debate affected Redfern Council most particularly. In October 1916 Redfern Council passed a motion "without a dissentient that conscription was not in the best interests in Australia", in direct opposition to the views of ALP Prime Minister Billy Hughes and the Member for Redfern James McGowen. McGowen lost his preselection in Redfern and in response the Redfern ALP Branch president, Alderman John Leitch (Mayor, 1908–1910, 1914–1915) resigned to join the pro-conscriptionists with his friend McGowen.

By the end of World War II, the Government of New South Wales realised that its ideas of infrastructure expansion could not be effected by the present system of the patchwork of small municipal councils across Sydney and the Minister for Local Government, Joseph Cahill, following the recommendations of the 1945–46 Clancy Royal Commission on Local Government Boundaries, passed a bill in 1948 that abolished a significant number of those councils. Under the Local Government (Areas) Act 1948, Redfern Municipal Council became the Redfern Ward of the City of Sydney, returning two aldermen.

== Mayors ==
| # | Portrait | Officeholder | Party | Term | | | Office | Notes |
| # | Portrait | Officeholder | Party | Took Office | Left Office | Tenure | Office | Notes |
|---|---|---|---|---|---|---|---|---|
| 1 | | Thomas Hayes | | 14 September 1859 | 1 June 1861 | 1 year, 260 days | Chairman | |
| 2 | | Michael Williamson | | 1 June 1861 | 5 February 1862 | 249 days | Chairman | |
| 3 | | George Renwick | | 5 February 1862 | 5 February 1864 | 2 years, 0 days | Chairman | |
| 4 | | Thomas Jones | | 5 February 1864 | 10 February 1865 | 1 year, 5 days | Chairman | |
| 5 | | Thomas Wild | | 10 February 1865 | 9 February 1866 | 364 days | Chairman | |
| 6 | | William Williamson | | 9 February 1866 | 7 February 1867 | 363 days | Chairman | |
| (3) | | George Renwick | | 7 February 1867 | 13 February 1868 | 1 year, 6 days | Chairman | |
| (3) | | George Renwick | | 13 February 1868 | 16 February 1872 | 4 years, 3 days | Mayor | |
| 7 | | Henry Hudson | | 16 February 1872 | 11 February 1874 | 1 year, 360 days | Mayor | |
| (6) | | William Williamson | | 11 February 1874 | 8 February 1876 | 1 year, 362 days | Mayor | |
| 8 | | Patrick Stanley | | 8 February 1876 | 11 February 1880 | 4 years, 3 days | Mayor | |
| (7) | | Henry Hudson | | 11 February 1880 | 9 February 1881 | 364 days | Mayor | |
| (8) | | Patrick Stanley | | 9 February 1881 | 10 February 1882 | 1 year, 1 day | Mayor | |
| 9 | | Francis Augustus Wright | | 10 February 1882 | 16 February 1885 | 3 years, 6 days | Mayor | |
| 10 | | George Lander | | 16 February 1885 | 3 February 1887 | 1 year, 352 days | Mayor | |
| 11 | | Edwin Berry | | 3 February 1887 | 10 February 1888 | 1 year, 7 days | Mayor | |
| 12 | | Thomas Williamson | | 10 February 1888 | 14 February 1889 | 1 year, 4 days | Mayor | |
| 13 | | John Crowe | | 14 February 1889 | 13 February 1890 | 364 days | Mayor | |
| 14 | | Thomas Clarke | | 13 February 1890 | 12 February 1891 | 364 days | Mayor | |
| 15 | | John Beveridge | | 12 February 1891 | 29 May 1891 | 106 days | Mayor | |
| 16 | | George William Howe | | 2 June 1891 | 17 February 1893 | 1 year, 260 days | Mayor | |
| 17 | | Cornelius Gorton | | 17 February 1893 | 15 February 1894 | 363 days | Mayor | |
| 18 | | William Davis | | 15 February 1894 | 15 February 1895 | 1 year, 0 days | Mayor | |
| 19 | | William Poole | | 15 February 1895 | 13 February 1896 | 363 days | Mayor | |
| 20 | | George Richard Parkes | | 13 February 1896 | 11 February 1897 | 364 days | Mayor | |
| 21 | | Joseph Medcalf | | 11 February 1897 | 8 February 1898 | 362 days | Mayor | |
| (11) | | Edwin Berry | | 8 February 1898 | 13 October 1898 | 247 days | Mayor | |
| (14) | | Thomas Clarke | | 13 October 1898 | 7 February 1900 | 1 year, 117 days | Mayor | |
| 22 | | Henry Vernon | | 7 February 1900 | 14 February 1901 | 1 year, 7 days | Mayor | |
| 23 | | James Jackson | | 14 February 1901 | 12 February 1902 | 363 days | Mayor | |
| 24 | | Thomas Fanning | | 12 February 1902 | 12 February 1903 | 1 year, 0 days | Mayor | |
| (20) | | George Richard Parkes | | 12 February 1903 | 13 February 1904 | 1 year, 0 days | Mayor | |
| (21) | | Joseph Medcalf | | 13 February 1904 | 17 February 1905 | 1 year, 5 days | Mayor | |
| (17) | | Cornelius Gorton | | 17 February 1905 | 16 February 1906 | 364 days | Mayor | |
| 25 | | James Owen Batchelor | | 16 February 1906 | 15 February 1907 | 364 days | Mayor | |
| 26 | | George Todd | | 15 February 1907 | 7 February 1908 | 357 days | Mayor | |
| 27 | | John Leitch | Labor | 7 February 1908 | 2 February 1911 | 2 years, 360 days | Mayor | |
| 28 | | Tom Holden | Labor | 2 February 1911 | 11 February 1914 | 3 years, 9 days | Mayor | |
| (27) | | John Leitch | Labor | 11 February 1914 | 4 February 1915 | 358 days | Mayor | |
| (28) | | Tom Holden | Labor | 4 February 1915 | 12 July 1917 | 2 years, 158 days | Mayor | |
| 29 | | Albert Clarke Isaacs | | 12 July 1917 | 5 February 1920 | 2 years, 208 days | Mayor | |
| 30 | | Patrick Roberts | Labor | 5 February 1920 | 6 December 1922 | 2 years, 304 days | Mayor | |
| 31 | | John Joseph Castle | Labor | 6 December 1922 | 20 December 1923 | 1 year, 14 days | Mayor | |
| 32 | | George Boyd | Labor | 20 December 1923 | 16 December 1924 | 362 days | Mayor | |
| 33 | | Patrick Mooney | Labor | 16 December 1924 | 23 December 1926 | 2 years, 7 days | Mayor | |
| (28) | | Tom Holden | Labor | 23 December 1926 | 23 December 1927 | 1 year, 0 days | Mayor | |
| 34 | | Francis James Gilmore | | 23 December 1927 | 12 December 1928 | 355 days | Mayor | |
| 35 | | John Hanafin | | 12 December 1928 | 19 December 1929 | 1 year, 7 days | Mayor | |
| 36 | | George Waite | Labor | 19 December 1929 | 18 December 1930 | 364 days | Mayor | |
| 37 | | Kenneth John Alexander MacRae | Labor | 18 December 1930 | 7 January 1932 | 1 year, 20 days | Mayor | |
| 38 | | George Wheatley | Labor | 7 January 1932 | 15 December 1932 | 343 days | Mayor | |
| (31) | | John Joseph Castle | Labor | 15 December 1932 | 31 December 1934 | 2 years, 16 days | Mayor | |
| 39 | | Harry Gardiner | Labor | 31 December 1934 | 10 January 1936 | 1 year, 10 days | Mayor | |
| 40 | | Joseph Malachi Gilmore | | 10 January 1936 | 8 January 1937 | 364 days | Mayor | |
| 41 | | Alexis Howarth | | 8 January 1937 | 23 December 1937 | 349 days | Mayor | |
| (34) | | Francis James Gilmore | | 23 December 1937 | 21 December 1939 | 1 year, 363 days | Mayor | |
| 42 | | James Francis Edward Gilmore | | 21 December 1939 | 11 December 1941 | 1 year, 355 days | Mayor | |
| 43 | | John Stephen O’Brien | | 11 December 1941 | 23 December 1943 | 2 years, 12 days | Mayor | |
| 44 | | Thomas Ormond Powell | | 23 December 1943 | 13 December 1944 | 356 days | Mayor | |
| 45 | | Edward Robert Elvy | | 13 December 1944 | 10 January 1946 | 1 year, 28 days | Mayor | |
| 46 | | Joseph Warburton | | 10 January 1946 | 18 December 1946 | 342 days | Mayor | |
| (41) | | Alexis Howarth | | 18 December 1946 | 31 December 1948 | 2 years, 13 days | Mayor | |

== Town Clerks ==
R. W. Grierson, Town Clerk of Redfern for 49 years (1885–1934).

| # | Town Clerk | Term start | Term end | Time in office | Notes |
|---|---|---|---|---|---|
| 1 | George Philben | 14 September 1859 | 31 December 1861 | 2 years, 108 days | |
| 2 | Edward Richard Jones | 1 January 1862 | 1 February 1863 | 1 year, 31 days | |
| 3 | Thomas Fraser | 1 February 1863 | 1 February 1869 | 6 years, 0 days | |
| 4 | William Steele Wardrop | 1 February 1869 | 21 January 1881 | 11 years, 355 days | |
| 5 | William Neale Parker | 21 January 1881 | 11 June 1885 | 4 years, 141 days | |
| 6 | Robert William Grierson | 11 June 1885 | 30 November 1934 | 49 years, 172 days | |
| 7 | Frank W. Wright | 30 November 1934 | 31 December 1948 | 14 years, 31 days | |

== See also ==
- The Hon. Jim Cope CMG, Redfern Alderman (1947–1948), Member of the Australian House of Representatives (MHR) (1955–1975), Speaker of the Australian House of Representatives (1973–1975).
- Phillip Sullivan, Redfern Alderman (1900), ALP Member of the NSW Legislative Assembly for Darlington and Phillip (1901–1907).
