= Electoral results for the district of Elizabeth (New South Wales) =

Election results for Elizabeth, New South Wales, Australia

Elizabeth, an electoral district of the Legislative Assembly in the Australian state of New South Wales was created in 1981 and abolished in 1988.

election	Member	Party
1981	Pat Hills	Labor
1984	Pat Hills	Labor

== Election results ==
=== Elections in the 1980s ===
==== 1984 ====
1984 New South Wales state election: Elizabeth
Party	Candidate	Votes	%	±%
Labor	Pat Hills	14,728	58.1	−18.9
Liberal	Philip Daley	4,447	17.5	+3.3
Independent	Michael Matthews	3,707	14.6	+14.6
Democrats	Jennifer MacLeod	1,939	7.7	+7.7
Independent	Nadar Ponnuswamy	511	2.0	+2.0
Total formal votes		25,332	95.8	+2.4
Informal votes		1,115	4.2	−2.4
Turnout		26,447	85.9	+3.3
Two-party-preferred result
Labor	Pat Hills		72.2	−12.5
Liberal	Philip Daley		27.8	+12.5
Labor hold		Swing	−12.5	

==== 1981 ====
1981 New South Wales state election: Elizabeth
Party	Candidate	Votes	%	±%
Labor	Pat Hills	18,563	77.0	+4.6
Liberal	John Davison	3,420	14.2	−4.9
Communist	Aileen Beaver	2,115	8.8	+3.8
Total formal votes		24,098	93.4	
Informal votes		1,689	6.6	
Turnout		25,787	82.6	
Two-party-preferred result
Labor	Pat Hills	20,063	84.7	+3.3
Liberal	John Davison	3,620	15.3	−3.3
Labor notional hold		Swing	+3.3	
