= John Leitch =

Australian politician (1860–1927)

John Leitch OBE JP

27th Mayor of Redfern
- In office 7 February 1908 – 2 February 1911
- Preceded by: George Todd
- Succeeded by: Tom Holden
- In office 11 February 1914 – 4 February 1915
- Preceded by: Tom Holden
- Succeeded by: Tom Holden

Alderman of the Redfern Municipal Council
- In office 5 March 1907 – 30 June 1917
- Preceded by: Patrick Stanley
- Constituency: Surry Hills Ward

Official Member of the Metropolitan Board of Water Supply and Sewerage
- In office 9 April 1912 – 31 March 1925

Personal details
- Born: 1860 Hobart, Colony of Tasmania
- Died: 7 May 1927 (aged 67) Redfern, New South Wales, Australia
- Party: ALP (to 1917); Independent (1917–1922)
- Relations: William Leitch (Brother)

John Leitch OBE JP (1860 – 7 May 1927) was an Australian politician who served as the first metropolitan Labor Mayor in New South Wales.

== Early life and career ==
John Leitch was born in Hobart, Tasmania to Scottish immigrants John Leitch and Jean McCrone. His elder brother was prominent AFL player and businessman, William Leitch. Leitch emigrated to Sydney, in the Colony of New South Wales when he was 17 years old. Leitch found work in the building trade and later became a master builder in the Redfern area.

== Political career ==
As a foundation member and later president of the Redfern Labour League, the local branch of the Labor Electoral League of New South Wales, Leitch for may years served on the electoral committee for the local member for Redfern, James McGowen. In February 1902, Leitch stood for the Belmore Ward of Redfern Municipal Council and in October 1905 stood in the by-election for Surry Hills Ward, but on both occasions was unsuccessful. Leitch was eventually elected unopposed for a vacancy on Surry Hills Ward in March 1907. At the municipal elections in February 1908, Leitch was one of seven Labor-endorsed candidates elected to the 12 member council and was elected as mayor, thereby becoming the first metropolitan Labor Mayor in New South Wales. Leitch was elected mayor for a further two consecutive terms and presided over the council during the council's 50th anniversary jubilee. In February 1914, he served a further term as mayor. Leitch's leadership of the council was recognised by The Sydney Morning Herald in its 1914 profile of the suburb: "Redfern has been most fortunate in having men of ability in the Mayoral chair. The names of, Clarke, Howe, Poole, Leitch, and others will be long honoured as worthy Mayors." Leitch led efforts for the establishment of the Royal South Sydney Hospital in 1912 and served as president of the hospital's board for several years.

In April 1912, he was appointed by his friend (and now Premier) James McGowen as one of the first members of the new Metropolitan Board of Water Supply and Sewerage. In 1923 he served as vice-president of the board. He served on the Board until its reconstitution, when the Metropolitan Water Sewerage and Drainage Act, 1924 came into effect in March 1925.

As mayor and as an alderman, Leitch was heavily involved in supporting Australia's efforts in the First World War, including as a member of the War Chest Committee and fundraising for Soldiers Comforts Funds. His fundraising efforts during the war resulted in his being awarded the rank of Officer of the Order of the British Empire (OBE) in October 1920. However, with the Redfern area's (and in particular Leitch's) close involvement with the labor movement and the Labor Party, the wartime conscription debate affected Redfern Council most particularly. In October 1916 Redfern Council passed a motion "without a dissentient that conscription was not in the best interests in Australia", in direct opposition to the views of ALP Prime Minister Billy Hughes and the Member for Redfern James McGowen. McGowen lost his preselection in Redfern and in response, Leitch, as the Redfern ALP Branch president, resigned from the party to join the pro-conscriptionists with his friend McGowen. Leitch himself did not stand for re-election as a Redfern Alderman, when his term expired in June 1917.

On his exit from the council, a later article in the Melbourne Argus noted that: "Leitch has lived to see Redfern about turn on both his old chief [James McGowen] and himself. On the matter of loyalty, Mr. McGowen and Mr. Leitch stood by the Union Jack, and that damned them with the more active section of Redfern citizens. Later the aldermen treated a war trophy with contempt and Mr. Leitch leased an allotment and installed it. That led to his concluding his aldermanic career." In 1921 Leitch led a public movement to accept a German war trophy which had been refused by Redfern Council and arranged for its placement on land leased by him in the suburb after the council also refused its placement on public land.

== Later life ==
Leitch stood for election to his old seat on Surry Hills Ward one final time in the December 1922 municipal elections, but was defeated. Leitch died at his home in Bourke Street, Redfern aged 67 on 7 May 1927. Survived by his wife, he was cremated for burial at Rookwood Cemetery.

Civic offices
Preceded by George Todd	Mayor of Redfern; 1908 – 1911	Succeeded by Tom Holden
Preceded by Tom Holden	Mayor of Redfern; 1914 – 1915	Succeeded by Tom Holden
