= Electoral district of Elizabeth =

Electoral district of Elizabeth may refer to:

- Electoral district of Elizabeth (New South Wales), a former electorate of the New South Wales Legislative Assembly
- Electoral district of Elizabeth (South Australia), an electorate of the South Australian House of Assembly 1970–2006 and 2018–
