= Thomas Douglas Percy Holden =

Australian politician (1859–1938)

The Honourable Thomas Holden JP

Member of the New South Wales Legislative Council
- In office 23 July 1912 – 22 April 1934
- Appointed by: Lord Chelmsford

28th Mayor of Redfern
- In office 2 February 1911 – 11 February 1914
- Preceded by: John Leitch
- Succeeded by: John Leitch
- In office 4 February 1915 – 12 July 1917
- Preceded by: John Leitch
- Succeeded by: Albert Clarke Isaacs
- In office 23 December 1926 – 23 December 1927
- Preceded by: Patrick Mooney
- Succeeded by: Francis James Gilmore

Alderman of the Municipality of Redfern for Redfern Ward
- In office 1 February 1908 – 31 December 1938

Personal details
- Born: 1 January 1859 Sydney, Colony of New South Wales
- Died: 31 December 1938 (aged 79) Ashfield, New South Wales, Australia
- Spouse: Louisa Hodge
- Children: Thomas Sinclair Holden

Thomas Douglas Percy Holden (1 January 1859 – 31 December 1938) was an Australian politician who served as a Member of the New South Wales Legislative Council from 1912 to 1934 and also as an Alderman and Mayor of the Municipality of Redfern. The owner of a tobacconist and barber shop in Redfern, Holden spent most of his career associated with the Australian Labor Party.

== Early life and career ==
He was born in Sydney to accountant Thomas Douglas Percy Holden and Mary Walsh. He ran a tobacconist and barber shop in Regent Street, Redfern. On 16 August 1898 he married Louisa Hodge, with whom he had three children. In 1899 he was commissioned as a Justice of the Peace.

== Political career ==
A foundation member of the Redfern Labour League, the local branch of the Labor Electoral League of New South Wales, Holden served as treasurer of the electoral committee for the local member for Redfern, James McGowen. In February 1908, Holden stood for the Redfern Ward of Redfern Municipal Council and was one of seven Labor-endorsed candidates elected to the 12 member council, with Alderman John Leitch, with Holden's nomination, becoming the first metropolitan Labor Mayor in New South Wales. In February 1911, Holden was unanimously elected Mayor of the council with an annual allowance of £150.

In March 1912, the now-Premier James McGowen advised Governor Lord Chelmsford to appoint 12 Labor candidates to a life appointment to the New South Wales Legislative Council and Holden was chosen alongside Edward Kavanagh, Francis Bryant, Henry Doyle, James Browne, Ernest Farrar, James Joynton Smith, James McInerney and Andrew Sinclair.

Soon after his election however, Holden came under intense scrutiny from Sydney scandal sheet The Truth, who alleged that Holden, a personal friend of Premier McGowen, only employed non-union members in his hairdressing shop. Truth also alleged that McGowen was a patron of Holden's shop and paid a penny less than the minimum required by hairdressers' union members. T. W. Kelsey, general secretary of the Hairdressers and Wig-makers Employees' Union of NSW, confirmed the allegations: "It is a fact that Mr. Holden [...] employs non union hairdressers in his shop at Redfern. He engaged a non-unionist hair dresser only a fortnight ago. He has two employees in his hairdressing saloon, and both, so far as I am aware, are non unionists. I, as secretary of this union, have openly denounced the Labor Government for appointing to the Legislative Council as a Labor member a man who thus defies union principles. He has been applied to several times by myself and others to employ only unionists, and he has always refused to give us any assurance that he would do so."

Holden found himself under investigation from the Political Labor League which recommended to the 1914 state conference that Labor endorsement of his candidacy for Redfern council in the 1914 municipal elections be refused. Holden, retiring as mayor of Redfern, but continuing as an Alderman was nevertheless reelected in his council seat ahead of the Labor-endorsed candidate. By 1916, however, a Labor executive minute noted that Holden's employees in his shop were now union members and he was now able to continue as a Labor-endorsed member. Despite being a personal friend of McGowen, Holden did not follow him or John Leitch when they were expelled from the Labor party over the conscription question.

He had left the Labor Party by 1921, and voted independently in the Legislative Council, including in 1926 when he voted against the Constitution (Amendment) Bill (No. 2) that would abolish the Legislative Council.

== Later life ==
Holden opposed Jack Lang in the 1931 split and sat as Federal Labor member until the reconstitution of the Council in 1934, with members being elected, not directly by the people, but by a joint sitting of the New South Wales Parliament. He did not stand for election in 1934, however his son, Thomas Sinclair Holden, was a United Australia Party candidate and was elected to a six-year term.

He died on New Year's Eve at Ashfield in 1938 (aged 79) whilst still serving as a Redfern Alderman.

Civic offices
Preceded by John Leitch	Mayor of Redfern; 1911 – 1914	Succeeded by John Leitch
Preceded by John Leitch	Mayor of Redfern; 1915 – 1917	Succeeded by Albert Clarke Isaacs
Preceded by Patrick Mooney	Mayor of Redfern; 1926 – 1927	Succeeded by Francis James Gilmore
