= Allan Leitch =

Australian rules footballer

Personal information
- Full name: Allan Leitch
- Born: 27 December 1902
- Died: 1 July 1976 (aged 73)
- Height: 178 cm (5 ft 10 in)
- Weight: 70 kg (154 lb)
- Position: Defender

Playing career^{1}
Years	Club	Games (Goals)
1922–24, 1926–31	New Town	135 (?)
1925	Carlton	17 (0)
- ^{1} Playing statistics correct to the end of 1931.

Allan McDonald Leitch (27 December 1902 – 1 July 1976) was an Australian rules footballer who played for New Town in the Tasmanian Football League (TFL) and Carlton in the Victorian Football League (VFL).

Leitch was the son of William Leitch. He was one of eight Carlton debutantes in the opening round of the 1925 VFL season and played in all 17 games that year. A defender, he then returned to his original club, New Town, where he won the Wilson Bailey Trophy as the league's 'best and fairest'. The following season the award was renamed in honour of his father, William Leitch. He came close to winning it in 1931, finishing runner-up behind Albert Collier.

Amongst his 13 interstate appearances, Leitch represented Tasmania at the 1924 Hobart and 1930 Adelaide Carnivals. He had been selected for the Melbourne Carnival, in 1927, but was unable to make the journey. Leith also regularly played for the TANFL representative team, 24 times in all.

In 2000, Leitch was named in the back pocket of the official Glenorchy (New Town) 'Team of the Century' and in 2005 he was an inductee into the Tasmanian Football Hall of Fame.
