= 1956 Olympic flame hoax =

1956 hoax involving a homemade Olympic flame torch

The 1956 Olympic flame hoax was an incident in which Barry Larkin, a veterinary student at the University of Sydney, ran with a homemade torch and fooled spectators, including a police escort and the Lord Mayor of Sydney, into thinking he was the torchbearer of the Olympic flame during the 1956 Summer Olympics in Melbourne. The Independent called it the greatest hoax in Olympic history.

== Background ==
The Nazi origin of the Olympic flame relay was one of the reasons Larkin protested it.

In the lead-up to the 1956 Summer Olympics, about 3,000 runners carried the Olympic torch across Australia. First it traveled in a 29-hour plane ride from Athens to Darwin, where it was given to its first runner, Aboriginal basketball star Billy Larrakeyeah. Champion runner Harry Dillon was scheduled to carry the torch to Sydney Town Hall and present it to Lord Mayor Pat Hills, who would then make a speech and pass it to the next runner.

Larkin and eight other students at St John's College, University of Sydney, planned to protest against the Olympic flame torch relay. One reason for the protest was that the torch relay was invented by the Nazis for the 1936 Summer Olympics in Berlin, Germany.

== Hoax ==
=== Preparation ===
The one student who planned to run wore white shorts and a white top, and a second prankster dressed in a reserve air force uniform to act as a fake military escort. The full group of pranksters built a homemade torch by taking a wooden leg from a chair, covering it with silver paint (still wet), and nailing an empty plum pudding can to the top. The result was a roughly torch-shaped object. To fuel the torch, they filled it with underwear doused in kerosene.

=== Execution ===
An estimated 30,000 people lined the streets of Sydney in anticipation. When the hoaxers arrived, they set the kerosene-drenched underwear on fire. With flaming torch in hand, the designated runner set off through the streets on foot. His friend, disguised as a uniformed motorcycle escort, joined him.

Initially, the two students and their fake torch garnered laughter from spectators and police. Then the runner swung his arms dramatically, accidentally flinging the kerosene-drenched underpants from his torch. He panicked and fled. The confused crowd drew closer. One of the prankster students on the sidelines, Peter Gralton, retrieved the burning underpants and commanded fellow prankster Barry Larkin to run with the fake torch, sending him off with a kick on the rump.

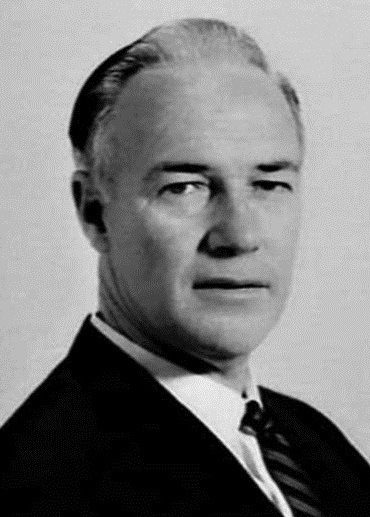
Pat Hills, then Lord Mayor of Sydney, who was prominently fooled by the hoax

Barry Larkin, wearing a tie and gray slacks because he did not expect to run, began to run. The crowd closed around him until police, who believed he was the official torchbearer, escorted him all the way to City Hall. He later recalled, "It was staggering — the noise, ticker tape and flash photography. All I could think was, what will I do when I get there?" Upon hearing the torch was early, Lord Mayor Hills rushed outside just in time to receive Larkin's burning homemade torch which covered his hands in paint. Hills was so flustered that he rushed into his prepared remarks without looking at the torch or paying attention to the paint on his hand. Barry Larkin walked quietly away, avoiding attention, and took a tram back to his university. The Lord Mayor did not realise the torch was a fake until someone whispered in his ear. He then confirmed into the microphone that a prank had occurred.

The audience became unruly. Larkin recalls about half of the crowd dispersed before Harry Dillon ran up carrying the genuine torch. As the crowd descended into chaos, police attempted to create an opening through the masses where Dillon could run. When Dillon finally passed the torch to the next runner, an army truck had to clear the path. A city council member remarked, "it is a wonder to me that people were not killed or injured."

=== Reception of the incident ===
Barry Larkin joined his friends at a pub to watch the events on television. The director of Larkin's college told him "well done, son" at breakfast the next morning, and later that day when he arrived to an exam, classmates greeted him with a standing ovation. Larkin failed the exam, later telling a reporter: "that's another story".

The incident made international news and generated fierce controversy in the local press. The hoax runner's identity was not widely known until 1998, so he was simply described as a Sydney University student. A laudatory essay in The Sydney Morning Herald declared it "set a new standard" for pranks. Another commentator praised Larkin for different reasons, calling the official Olympic torch procession "a pagan cult" and lauding the prankster who "debunked" it. According to the writer, Larkin and his torch of fiery underwear were "no more absurd than" the planned events, which involved solemn city officials "in their robes of office" performing "an anachronistic ritual which the Greeks themselves gave away in the light of Christianity." The writer ended with a comparison of the torch and Jesus: "The Olympic torch is not the Light that will bring peace into the world."

One unsatisfied observer blasted the city for failing to put on an event "undefiled by adolescent irresponsibility" and demanded "severe punishment" for perpetrators. Sydney's city council considered prohibiting Sydney University from holding a Commemoration Day procession the next year. A heated letter of response in the newspaper called city councillors "petulant and spoiled children" and the council dropped the proposed repercussions. When a council member called the false torch "disgraceful", an unnamed The Sydney Morning Herald writer wrote his comment was evidence of "the pomposity which often besets those who are elected to public office in this country."

=== Aftermath ===
Barry Larkin received no punishment and eventually became a successful veterinary surgeon in Melbourne. The fake torch ended up in the possession of fellow hoaxer John Lawler, who kept it under his bed for years until his mother discarded it while tidying his house.

Four decades after the hoax, the other pranksters were described as "professional men, pillars of the community."

== Related events ==
Before the 2000 Summer Olympics in Sydney, Larkin's hoax received another wave of media attention. Police stationed security guards along the route as a protective measure against potential copycats. Two people attempted to steal the torch and one man tried to put out the torch using a fire extinguisher. None of the attempts succeeded.
