= Miklós Barabás =

Hungarian artist (1810–1898)

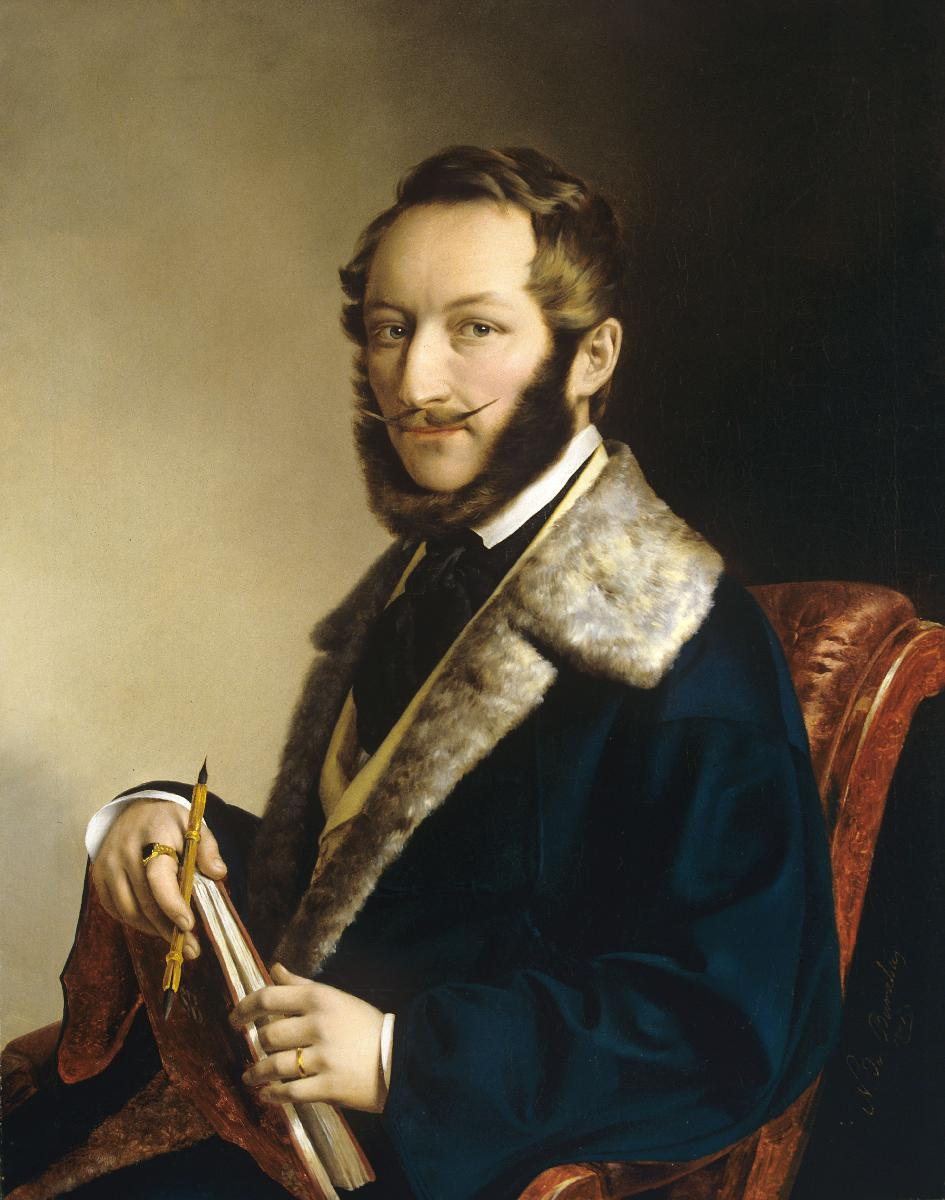
Self-portrait (1841)

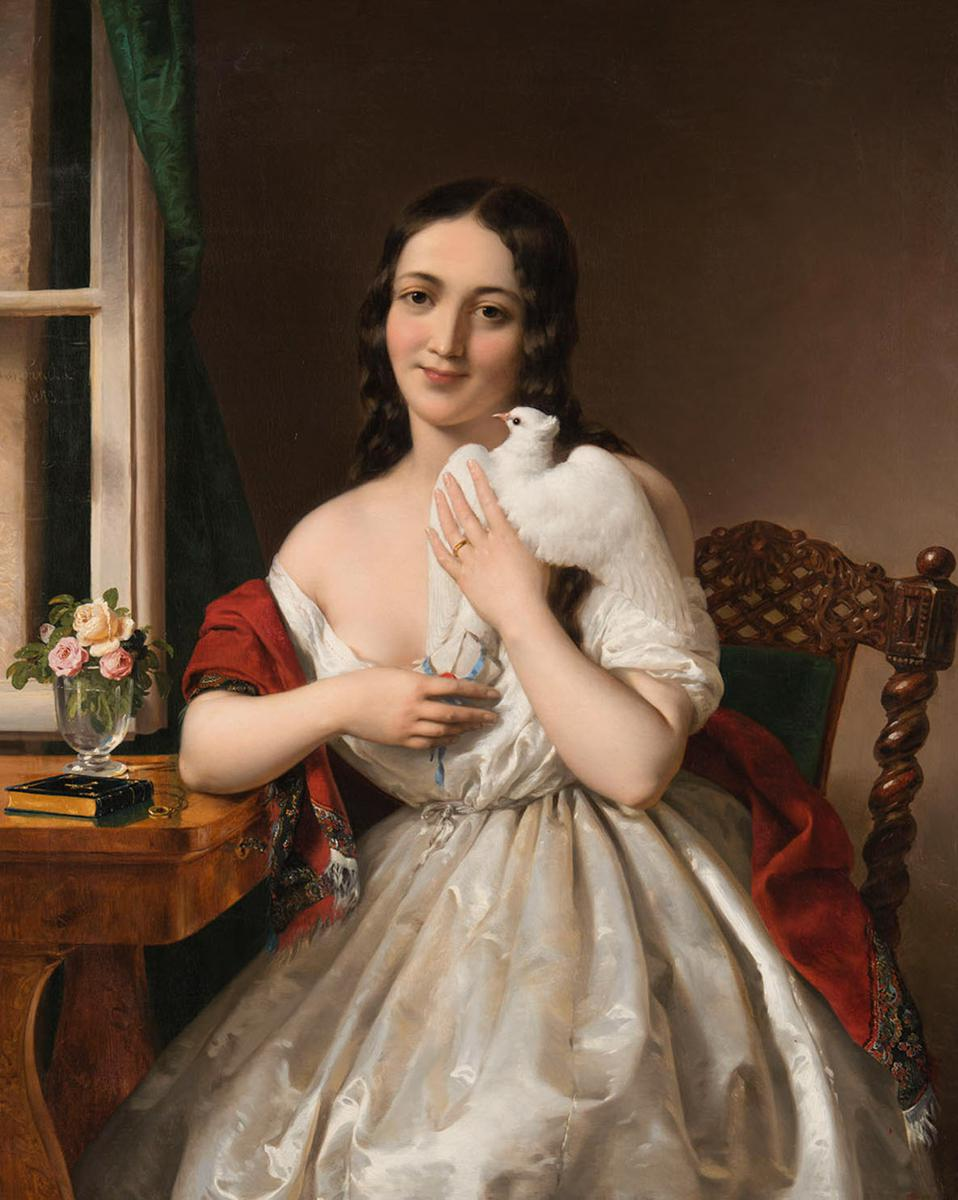
Pigeon post (1843)

Miklós Barabás (10 February 1810, in Márkosfalva (rom. Mărcușa), Háromszék County, Hungary – 12 February 1898, in Budapest, Hungary) was a Hungarian painter. He is mostly known for his portrait paintings, including a famous portrait of a young Franz Liszt, done in 1847 and an 1853 portrait of Emperor Franz Joseph I.

== Biography ==
Miklós Barabás was educated at the Protestant school of Nagyenyed (today Aiud, Romania). He painted from an early age, and in 1829 he was a pupil of Johann Ender in Vienna for a while. Back in Kolozsvár (today Cluj-Napoca, Romania) in 1830 he learned lithography from Gábor Barra (1799-1837). In 1831, he moved to Romania, Bucharest. In 1834-1835 he traveled to Italy, where he learned watercolor painting from the Scottsman William Leighton Leitch who was six years his senior; they became friends and toured and painted in the Lago Maggiore region in 1834, and Leitch was a great influence on Barabás's future work. He finally settled in Pest in 1855.

He won the great support of the literary and political leaders of the Reform Age, and was undeniably a pioneer of Hungarian national art. He was a founder and active member of art life in Hungary, and the beginnings of Hungarian genre painting are also linked with his name. His Romanian Family Going To The Fair (1844) was considered the most beautiful folk genre painting of its time. It met with great success at both the 1844 exhibition of the Vienna Art Association, and later in Pest. Barabas spent most of his life in Pest. During absolutism, he had to face financial problems, forcing him to take photos and to paint altars for some time. As a result of his struggle, the Art Society was established in 1859, of which he was the President from 1862 until his death.

Starting in his 20s he painted a great number of Hungary, Austria and Romania's elite in formal portraits. The subjects included men and women from politics, music and literature, religious leaders, military men and high society, but he also painted scenes of rural life and peasant family portraits. His realistic style was in vogue in mid-19th-century Europe, in the decades just before photography was invented and the artistic revolution of Impressionism. As late as 1884 he painted a well-known portrait of the great Hungarian poet János Arany. Revolutionary Lajos Kossuth and poet/revolutionary Sándor Petőfi are also among his famous subjects.

He became a member of the Parliament of Hungary in 1867, representing Pest. He died in Budapest.

== Sources ==
- Constantin von Wurzbach: "Barabás, Nikolaus." In: Biographisches Lexikon des Kaiserthums Oesterreich (Biographical Lexicon of the Empire of Austria). Part 1 Universitäts-Buchdruckerei L. C. Zamarski (formerly J. P. Sollinger), Vienna 1856, p. 147 f. (digitalised).
- "Barabás Nikolaus". In: Österreichisches Biographisches Lexikon 1815–1950 (ÖBL). Vol. 1, Austrian Academy of Sciences, Vienna 1957, p. 48 f. (Direct links to "p. 48", "p. 49")
- Edith Hoffmann: Barabás Miklós. Pantheon, Budapest 1923 (Online)
