= Wal Campbell =

Australian journalist (1906–1979)

John William Wallace "Wal" Campbell (27 November 1906 – 4 July 1979) was an Australian anti-Catholic journalist and refrigeration mechanic.

Campbell was born in Johannesburg to John William Wallace Campbell, an Australian Boer War veteran, and Antonette Cholette, née Bleckmann. The younger Campbell, known as "Wal", came to Australia as an infant, and was a telegram delivery boy, a drover and a shearer. Ultimately he became a refrigerator mechanic.

On 31 May 1940 Campbell enlisted in the Australian Imperial Force, serving in the Middle East and Papua with the 2nd/4th Field Company of the Royal Australian Engineers. He was sent back to Australia in August 1943 after contracting malaria, and was discharged a sergeant on 23 October 1945. During his service in the Middle East, Campbell came to believe that Syrian Catholic priests had betrayed Allied forces after observing a man signalling from a monastery window, instilling in him the anti-Catholicism that would characterise the rest of his life.

In January 1945 Campbell began publishing The Rock, a "brash eight-page tabloid", reporting on supposed corruption, sex scandals and intrigue inside the Catholic Church. By the 1950s, circulation of the paper was around 30,000, but it was never financially secure. Although it had considerable influence during the debate on government funding of religious schools, and in particular during the Labor Split of 1955, the paper gradually declined, especially after Vatican II. The death of Pope John Paul I in 1978 fuelled Campbell's beliefs of conspiracy within the church. He was arrested in 1978 after a disturbance at the Royal Prince Alfred Hospital in Sydney, and he found himself out of place in a more modern world. The Rock, still running, became a monthly paper in the late 1970s, when Campbell moved to Calvert in Queensland.

He stood as a candidate for the federal seat of East Sydney in 1946, the New South Wales seat of Phillip at the 1954 by-election, and for the Australian Senate in 1955, but was unsuccessful on each occasion.

Campbell died in 1979 at Grandchester, Queensland, and was cremated with Reformed Presbyterian forms. He was unmarried. The Rock, though no longer possessing any of the influence it had enjoyed during the 1950s, published its final issue only in 1995.
