= Peter Leitch =

Peter Leitch may refer to:

- Sir Peter Leitch (businessman) (born 1944), New Zealand businessman nicknamed "The Mad Butcher"
- Peter Leitch (musician) (1944–2024), Canadian jazz guitarist
- Peter Leitch (VC) (1820–1892), Scottish soldier who received the Victoria Cross
