= Billy Leitch =

English footballer

Personal information
- Full name: William Leitch
- Date of birth: 1895
- Place of birth: Cullybackey, Ireland
- Date of death: 1963 (aged 67–68)
- Position: Wing-half

Senior career*
Years	Team	Apps	(Gls)
1913–1914	Greenock Overton		
1914–1915	Port Glasgow Athletic		
1915–1920	Partick Thistle		
1917	→ Distillery (loan)		
1920–1923	Coventry City	27	(2)
1923–1926	Bournemouth & Boscombe Athletic	81	(1)
1927	Helensburgh		
Total		108	(3)
- * Club domestic league appearances and goals

William Leitch (1895–1963) was an Irish footballer who played in the Football League for Bournemouth & Boscombe Athletic and Coventry City.
