= John Beveridge (mayor) =

Australian politician (1848–1916)

John Beveridge JP

15th Mayor of Redfern
- In office 12 February 1891 – 29 May 1891
- Preceded by: Thomas Clarke
- Succeeded by: George Howe

Alderman on the Redfern Municipal Council
- In office 20 September 1886 – 29 May 1891
- Preceded by: Francis Augustus Wright
- Succeeded by: William Poole
- Constituency: Belmore Ward

Personal details
- Born: 8 August 1848 Windsor, Colony of New South Wales
- Died: 15 March 1916 (aged 67) Randwick, New South Wales, Australia
- Resting place: Waverley Cemetery
- Party: Free Trade Party
- Spouse: Priscilla Wright (1853–1929)
- Children: 7
- Occupation: Merchant and businessman

John Beveridge, JP (8 August 1848 – 15 March 1916) was a New South Wales businessman, sportsman and local government politician, who served as an Alderman (1886–1891) and Mayor of Redfern (1891).

== Early life and background ==
Beveridge was born 8 August 1848 in the town of Windsor, Colony of New South Wales. He was the son of John Beveridge, a baker and confectioner, and Jane Greig, who as assisted migrants had emigrated from Kirkcaldy, Fife, Scotland, to Sydney on 16 January 1839. At the age of 19, Beveridge entered the mercantile firm of George Griffiths and Co. in 1867. On 8 August 1871 he was married to Priscilla Wright, the Anglo-Irish daughter of teacher and later principal of the Fort Street Training School John Wright (1822–1887), at St Andrew's Presbyterian Church, Sydney, by the Rev. Robert Lewers. Beveridge and his wife Priscilla had seven children: John Stuart (1872–1874), Percy (1875–1947), Mabel (1878–1955), Harry (1882–1943), Violet (1886–1975), Cecil (1888–1946), and Roy Stuart (1893–1916). In 1880 he was made a partner in the firm, and on the retirement of Griffiths became the owner, which specialised in "wholesale grocery and general merchandise" from its premises on the corner of Bridge and Young streets, Sydney.

A prominent member of the flourishing business community in Sydney and Redfern, Beveridge became involved as a member of the Sydney Chamber of Commerce and as a director of the Mortgage, Guarantee and Mercantile Finance Corporation of New South Wales, the Sydney Real Estate Bank and the Australian Traders' Fire Insurance Company. Beveridge also became a member of the Redfern Branch of the Free Trade Association. A keen sportsman, Beveridge was a member of the Cricket Union (vice-president in 1889) and was instrumental in the development of the Surry United Cricket Club, being captain from 1879 (now the Surry Hills Cricket Club).

== Public service ==
Beveridge eventually stood for office as a free trader and became an alderman unopposed on Redfern Municipal Council for Belmore Ward on 20 September 1886, filling a vacancy created by the departure of Alderman Francis Augustus Wright, and was re-elected in February 1888. In September 1888 he presided over a meeting at Redfern Town Hall to support the ultimately-unsuccessful candidacy of free trader John Martin for a by-election to the New South Wales Legislative Assembly seat of Redfern; the meeting was attended by Sir Henry Parkes who also spoke in support.

Beveridge strongly aligned himself with the politics of Parkes and later stood for the seat of Redfern himself as a Free Trade candidate at the 1889 colonial election, but was unsuccessful, missing out by a margin of over 100 votes, despite the overall success of the Free Trade movement at that election, with Parkes forming government. Even so, on 12 June 1890 he was appointed to the Redfern Sub-District Public School Board by the Governor Lord Carrington, on the advice of Free Trader Minister for Public Instruction, Joseph Carruthers.

On 12 February 1891 Beveridge was elected to be mayor of the council and was instrumental in making Redfern the first suburb in Sydney to have electricity and electric street lighting, which occurred when the Council voted unanimously in 1891, following the recommendations of the improvements committee, to build its own power station in Turner Street to power the suburb. Beveridge then proposed and passed through council a loan of £50,000 for the purpose. This movement by the council was later affirmed and protected by the Parliament of New South Wales when it passed the Borough of Redfern Electric Lighting Act 1895.

However, by May 1891 Beveridge had resigned as mayor and an alderman for Redfern prior to his candidacy for the 1891 election. His vacancy in Belmore Ward was subsequently filled by William Poole. Beveridge stood again as a Free Trade candidate for Redfern, reaffirming his support for the Free Trade vision for Australian Federation and noting that overall wages in New South Wales were higher compared to Victoria and taxation was lower owing to the Free Trade system in NSW, a system "that is best for the commercial interests of the colony." Beveridge was however again unsuccessful at the June election which saw the Free Traders lose out to the Labor Party and the Protectionists.

== Later life ==
Following this defeat, Beveridge returned to business, taking up a position in the Sydney office of the New York Life Insurance Company. On 25 November 1891, Beveridge sold his merchandise business, George Griffiths and Co. to David Cohen and Company. Beveridge nevertheless retained his keen interest in the Free Trade movement and in politics generally, including presiding over the election committee for John Neild's unsuccessful bid for the seat of Woollahra at the 1894 election (he lost to Adrian Knox, standing as an 'Independent Free Trade' candidate). George Reid's Free traders were successful at that election and Beveridge, in a letter to the Sydney Morning Herald, noted: "the vote of last Tuesday must inspire every thinking man in the community with the idea that the people are ripe for the establishment of a progressive policy, and I believe Mr Reid is the man for the hour."

=== Lithgow ===
By 1896, Beveridge had opened his own retail business, "Beveridge and Company, Limited", in the Eskbank area of the rural and mining town of Lithgow and involved himself in various community activities, including in cricket. Reporting on his attendance at a Lithgow reception for Premier Reid in May 1896, the Windsor and Richmond Gazette noted: "no doubt, ere long Mr. [Beveridge] will take a leading part in matters connected with the welfare of the town, for he is too good a man to be allowed to stay long in clover. His ability is already recognised in his new home, and a matter of a few months will decide whether he enters the Municipal arena or not. If he does, Lithgow will be the gainer." In early 1896 Beveridge nominated to take up a vacancy on Lithgow Ward on Lithgow Municipal Council, but received only 6 votes. The next year he stood again for Lithgow Ward but lost by one vote. Beveridge became heavily involved in local cricket circles, donating the "Beveridge Cup" for district matches, and becoming President of the Lithgow District Cricket Association in 1899; the patron of the association that year was prominent local politician Joseph Cook.

His business, meanwhile, continued to grow, opening a haberdashery in the centre of Lithgow in April 1898, and he appointed his son Percy to manage a new branch of the store in the nearby town of Wallerawang.

A supporter of Australian Federation, Beveridge was nominated to attend the People's Federal Convention at Bathurst in November 1896, which had convened to discuss the 1891 draft Constitution being proposed for the Commonwealth of Australia. The most important recommendation made by the convention was that the Senate should be directly elected. In December 1897, Beveridge established the Lithgow Land, Building, and Investment Company and became a company director. As a longstanding Justice of the Peace, on 23 January 1899 Beveridge was appointed by Governor Lord Hampden, on the recommendation of Minister for Justice Charles Lee, as Coroner for Lithgow and for the colony at large.

=== Hay ===
On 3 May 1900, the Wallerawang store of Beveridge and Company was destroyed by fire. In June 1900, he had purchased the merchandise "Boss Store" business of M. McCann in the Riverina town of Hillston, and appointed his son Percy as manager (who later served as an alderman of the Hillston Municipality from 1901 to 1903). His Lithgow business was managed in his absence, and continued under his name until July 1902, when, under new ownership, it was renamed the "Lithgow Supply Co. Ltd".

By October 1900, Beveridge had moved again to the nearby town of Hay, and purchased the general merchandise store of P. B. Terry & Company in the town to be the latest branch of Beveridge and Company. It was not long before Beveridge again returned to cricketing circles, in the Hay Cricket Association, later serving as vice-president, and rising to be president of the Hay Chamber of Commerce in 1901. In February 1901, Beveridge was elected as Honorary Secretary at the inaugural meeting of the Hay Free Trade Association and later assisting in the campaign of Free Trade candidate James Ashton for the seat of Riverina at the first federal election a month later. In May 1902 Beveridge departed Hay for a visit to London for the Coronation of King Edward VII and Queen Alexandra.

=== Return to Sydney ===
Following the closure of the remaining Beveridge and Co stores in Hay and Hillston in early 1904, Beveridge eventually moved back to Sydney with his family, in later years he served as the general manager of the Merchants' and Traders' Employment Bureau, which his brother Peter had purchased in July 1908. The Bureau's offices were sited within the New York Mutual Life Building at 14 Martin Place, Sydney. Beveridge moved with his family to a new residence, "Violet" in Balfour Road, Kensington, and was involved in the Randwick Cricket Association and the Sydney City Bowling Club, but in later years his health suffered greatly owing to "acute heart trouble", which led to his death aged 67 on 15 March 1916. His youngest son Lance sergeant Roy Stuart Beveridge (20th Battalion) was later killed in action following the Battle of Flers in France on 12 November 1916. His eldest son Percy became a bank officer with the Bank of New Zealand and was a representative cricketer in New Zealand, while his son Cecil became a theatre manager and, also of the 20th Battalion, was injured during the Battle of Pozières in 1916. He is interred with his wife (d. 1929) and his third son, Harry (d. 1943, who was a branch manager for the Commonwealth Bank) at Waverley Cemetery.

== Notes ==
Civic offices
Preceded by Thomas Clarke	Mayor of Redfern; 1891	Succeeded by George Howe
