= Judy Mundey =

Australian feminist and left-wing activist (born 1944)

Judith Ann Mundey (née Willcocks; born 29 January 1944) is an Australian feminist and left-wing activist who was the first female president of the Communist Party of Australia.

She was born in Sydney to John Willcocks and Phyllis, née Rimmer. She attended Eastlakes and Mascot primary schools and St George Girls' High School before studying for a Bachelor of Arts at Macquarie University. In 1965 she married Jack Mundey and became involved in the communist movement. She was an important figure in the establishment of the women's liberation movement in Australia and in 1979 became the first female national president of the Communist Party of Australia, holding the position until 1982.
