= William Leitch (scientist) =

Scottish scientist (1814–1864)

- Born: 20 May 1814; Rothesay, Bute, Scotland, UK
- Died: 9 May 1864 (aged 49); Kingston, Canada West
- Resting place: Cataraqui Cemetery, Kingston, Ontario, Canada
- Citizenship: British
- Education: Bachelor of Arts, 1837; Master of Arts, 1838; Doctor of Divinity, 1860
- Alma mater: University of Glasgow
- Known for: Earliest known scientific description of rocket-powered spaceflight
- Scientific career
- Fields: Astronomy, Natural history, Mathematics

William Leitch (20 May 1814 – 9 May 1864) was a Scottish astronomer, naturalist and mathematician, and a minister of the Church of Scotland. Leitch studied mathematics and science at the University of Glasgow, and moved to Canada in 1860 to take the post of principal at Queen's University.

Space historian Robert Godwin published in October 2015 his discovery that Leitch gave the first modern scientific explanation of the potential for space exploration using rockets (1861). Leitch was said to be "a distinguished astronomer, naturalist and mathematician", and his proposal for rocket spaceflight came four decades prior to more well-known proposals by Konstantin Tsiolkovsky (1903), Robert Esnault-Pelterie (1913), Robert H. Goddard (1914), and Hermann Oberth (1923). Leitch's rocket spaceflight description was first provided in his 1861 essay "A Journey Through Space". The essay was published in a journal in Edinburgh that year before being included in his book God's Glory in the Heavens (1862). This description correctly attributed rocket thrust to the "internal reaction" (Newton's laws of motion) and correctly identified that rocket thrust is most effective in the vacuum of space. In the third edition of his biography of Leitch, Godwin explained Leitch's connections to the Boston community, and specifically how both Leitch and Robert Hutchings Goddard both knew and corresponded with patent attorney Orson Desaix Munn.

== Education ==
A serious accident confined Leitch to his room for many months at age 14, during which he studied mathematics and science. After the grammar school at Greenock, he attended the University of Glasgow and earned a Bachelor of Arts degree with highest honours in 1837. He followed this with a Master of Arts the next year, and became observatory assistant to Professor John Pringle Nichol, and lectured on astronomy. He then studied for two years at the university's Divinity Hall, and became a licensed minister of the Church of Scotland in 1839.

== Ministry ==
Leitch stayed with the Kirk through the Disruption of 1843, when he was ordained and worked in the parish of Monimail, in the presbytery of Cupar for 16 years. During this time he worked with the church's Sabbath schools and became interested in popular education. He was awarded the degree of Doctor of Divinity by Glasgow University in 1860.

== University principal in Canada ==
In 1859, two trustees of Queen's University in Kingston, Ontario came to Scotland to find a successor to the retiring principal. Leitch accepted the post and moved to Ontario in October 1860.
