= Tom Shannon (Australian politician) =

Australian politician

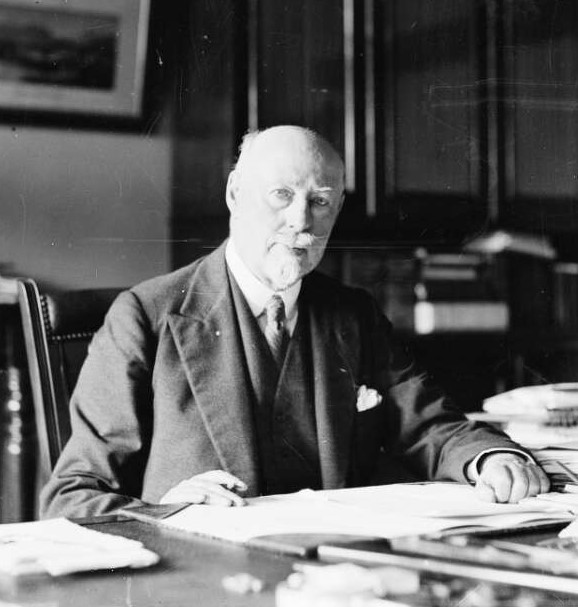

Alderman of the Sydney City Council
- In office 1 December 1921 – 31 December 1927
- Constituency: Cook Ward
- In office 18 June 1930 – 31 December 1948
- Constituency: Flinders Ward

Personal details
- Born: 9 December 1884 Redfern, Colony of New South Wales
- Died: 9 June 1954 (aged 69) Sydney, New South Wales, Australia
- Party: Australian Labor Party (New South Wales Branch), Australian Labor Party (NSW)

Thomas John Shannon (9 December 1884 – 9 June 1954) was an Australian real estate agent, alderman and state politician. He was a member of the New South Wales Legislative Assembly from 1927 until his death. He was variously a member of the Labor Party(ALP) and the Australian Labor Party (NSW).

== Early life and career ==
Shannon was born in Redfern, New South Wales and was the son of a cab driver. He was educated to elementary level at St Benedict's, Broadway and worked as a grocer's boy and eventually as a real estate agent. He became involved with community organisations including the Hibernian Australian Catholic Benefit Society, a provider of social security insurance, and was elected as an Alderman on Sydney City Council between 1921 and 1927 and between 1930 and 1948.

== State parliament ==
Shannon was elected to the New South Wales Parliament as the Labor member for the newly re-created seat of Surry Hills at the 1927 election. The seat was abolished by a redistribution prior to the next election and Shannon transferred to the seat of Phillip where the sitting Labor member Michael Burke had retired. In 1930 he won election as Treasurer of the State Branch of the party.

He retained the seat for Labor at the next 8 elections and died as the sitting member in 1954. He was a member of the Australian Labor Party (NSW) during that party's estrangement from the ALP federal executive but he did not support later manifestations of Lang Labor.

New South Wales Legislative Assembly
New district	Member for Surry Hills; 1927 – 1930	District abolished
Preceded by Michael Burke	Member for Phillip; 1930 – 1954	Succeeded by Pat Hills
