= Patrick Mooney (Australian politician) =

Australian politician

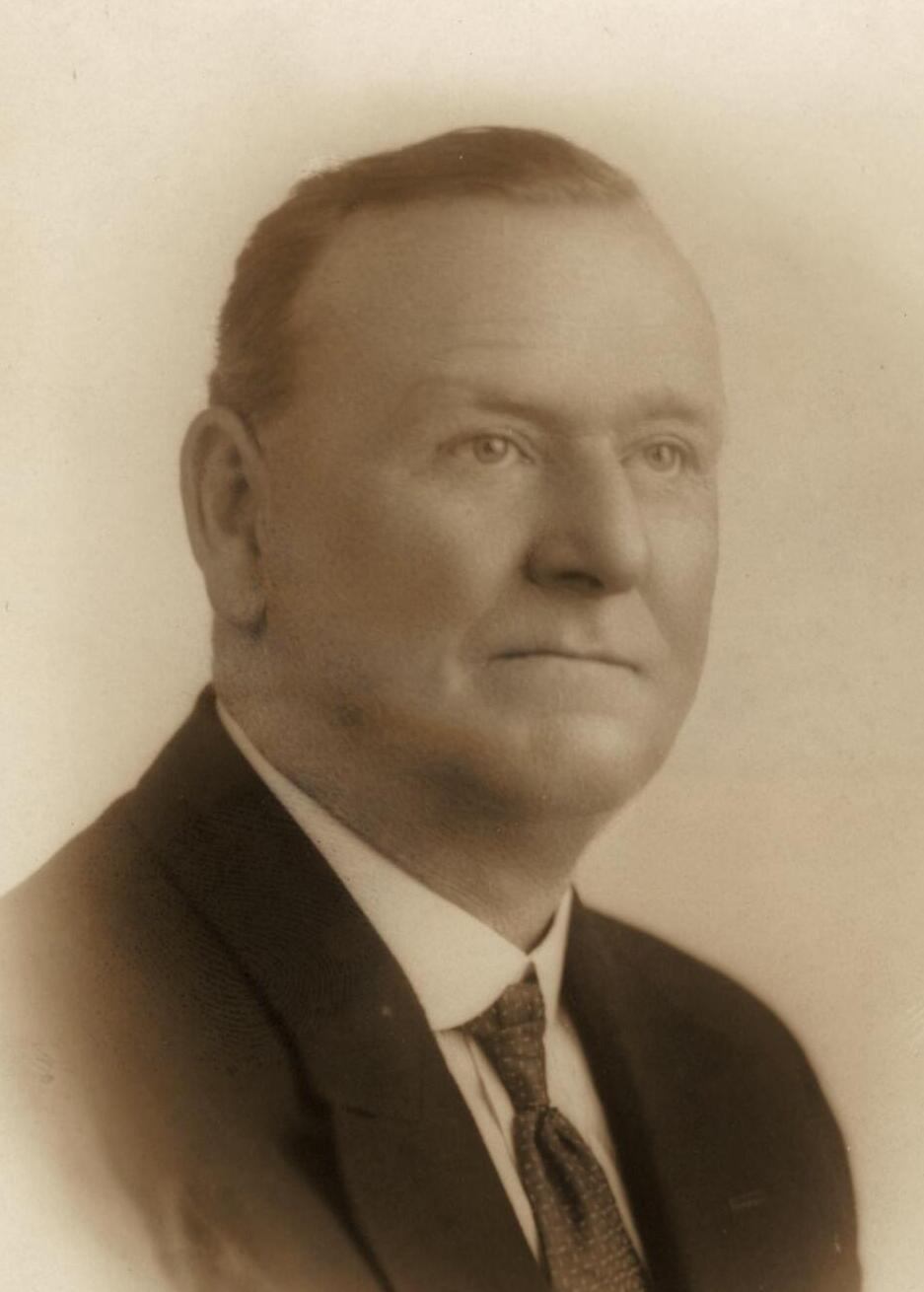

Senator for New South Wales
- In office 23 December 1931 – 30 June 1932
- Preceded by: Walter Duncan

Personal details
- Born: Patrick Frederick Mooney; 17 January 1880 Eurobodalla, New South Wales, Australia
- Died: 23 December 1942 (aged 62) Lewisham, New South Wales, Australia
- Party: Labor
- Other political affiliations: Lang Labor
- Spouse: Bridget Collins (m. 1911)
- Occupation: Hotel manager, tram driver

Patrick Frederick Mooney (17 January 1880 – 23 December 1942) was an Australian politician. He served as a Senator for New South Wales from 1931 to 1932, representing the Lang Labor faction of the Australian Labor Party (ALP). He was a long-serving member of the Redfern Municipal Council and was a hotel manager and tram driver before entering politics.

== Early life ==
Mooney was born on 17 January 1880 near Eurobodalla, New South Wales. He was the third son of Kate (née Browne) and Thomas Mooney. His father was a farmer and later became a hotel manager and publican.

Mooney began working for his father after completing primary school, helping run hotels at Bega, Pambula and Tomerong. He later managed the Railway Hotel in Bathurst. He moved to Sydney in 1908 and began working as a conductor on the Sydney tramways. He later qualified as a driver and joined the Government Tramway Employees' Association, becoming vice-president by 1917. He supported the 1917 general strike.

== Politics ==
Mooney joined the ALP in 1913. He remained loyal following the 1916 party split and was elected to the state executive. He served on Redfern Municipal Council from 1920 to 1928, including as mayor in 1924.

In December 1931, Mooney was nominated to fill the casual vacancy caused by the resignation of Senator Walter Duncan, a member of the United Australia Party (UAP). By that time he was associated with the Lang Labor faction controlled by New South Wales premier Jack Lang, which held a majority in state parliament and operated as a separate caucus in federal parliament. Mooney's appointment to the Senate, occurring only four days after the 1931 federal election, was likely invalid under the Senate Elections Act 1903, as Senator Hal Colebatch noted in April 1932. The vacancy should have been filled by Charles Hardy, who was elected to a term beginning on 1 July 1932. However, the issue was not taken before the Court of Disputed Returns before the expiry of Mooney's term on 30 June 1932.

Mooney spoke only five times in the Senate and was a staunch defender of Lang and his government's policies. He returned to local politics and served as a Redfern alderman until 1935, as well as a Lang Labor organiser.

== Personal life ==
Mooney married Bridget Collins in 1911, with whom he had six children. He died in Lewisham, New South Wales, on 23 December 1942 at the age of 62.

Civic offices
Preceded by George Boyd	Mayor of Redfern; 1924–1926	Succeeded by Frank J. Gilmore
