= Will Leitch (Northern Irish journalist) =

Northern Irish journalist

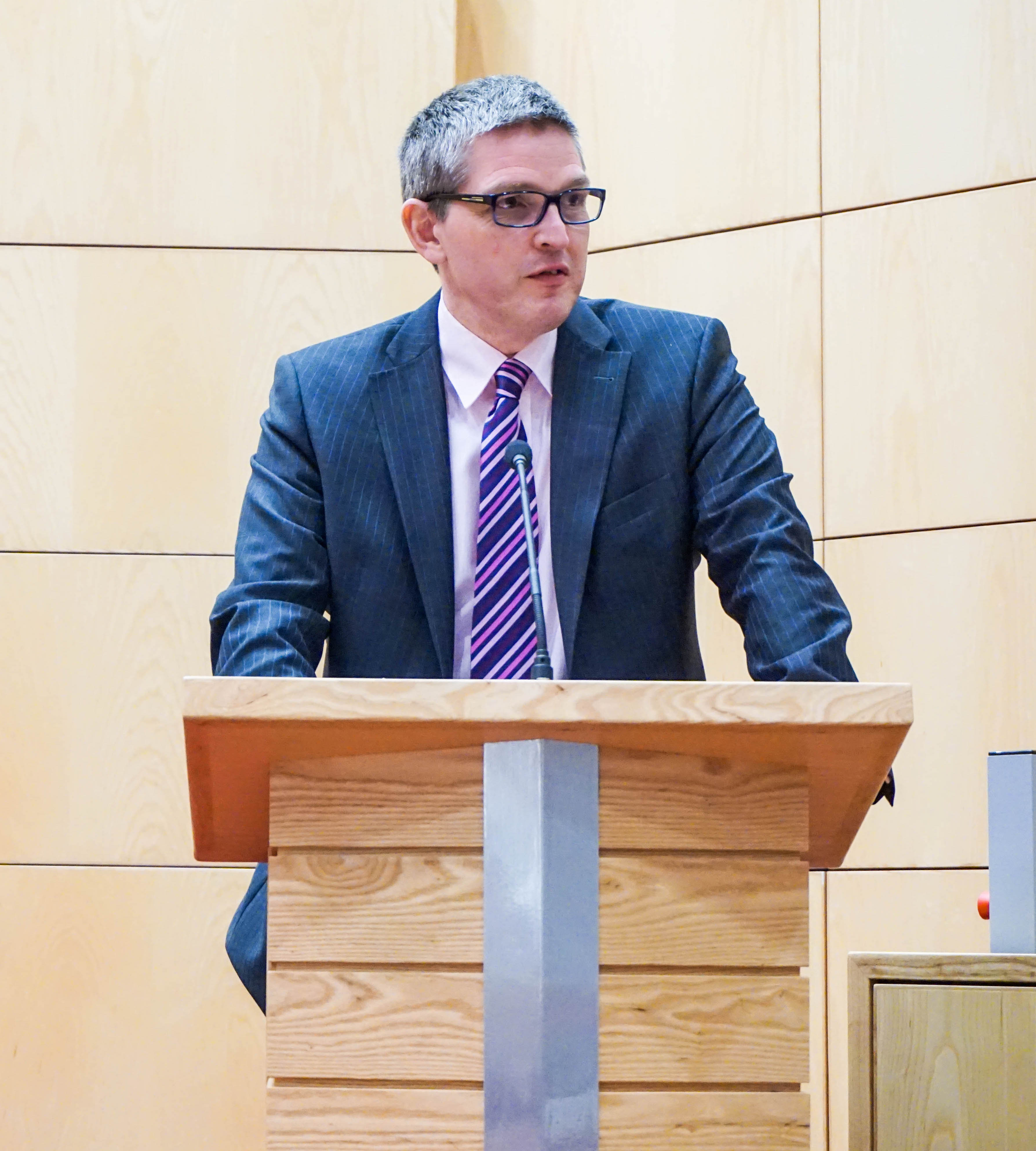
- Education: Queen's University Belfast

Will Leitch is a Northern Irish journalist who has worked for the BBC since 1990. His work for the BBC has included covering those killed during the Troubles and the Irish Catholic child abuse scandal, as well as other more general news coverage.

He delivered a response on behalf of the BBC to Jenny Taylor's Catherwood Lecture in 2015, which criticised the BBC's coverage of religion.

Leitch studied at Queen's University Belfast.
