= William Leighton Leitch =

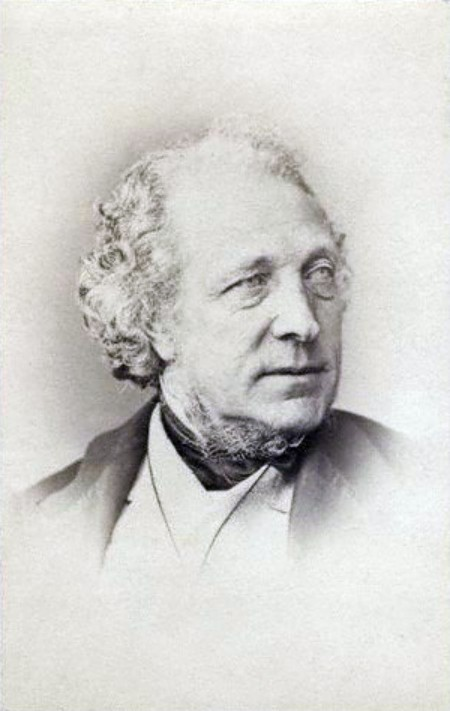
William Leighton Leitch (1860s) by Elliott & Fry

William Leighton Leitch (2 November 1804 – 25 April 1883) was a Scottish landscape watercolourist and illustrator. He was Drawing Master to Queen Victoria for 22 years. He was Vice President of the Royal Institute of Painters in Watercolours, on Pall Mall, London, for twenty years.

His watercolours matched the taste of his time, and remain popular with collectors, but are not regarded with great enthusiasm by modern critics, described as "pleasant and competent, but in no way original". In his later career they tend to become formulaic; his earlier Italian views often "show more freedom and imagination". Martin Hardie felt that though he had "intimate knowledge of what pencil and brush could accomplish ... his outlook was neither original nor emotional; he was insensitive to atmosphere; and was apt to clutter his work with a profusion of details and incidents rendered with painstaking accuracy".

== Life ==
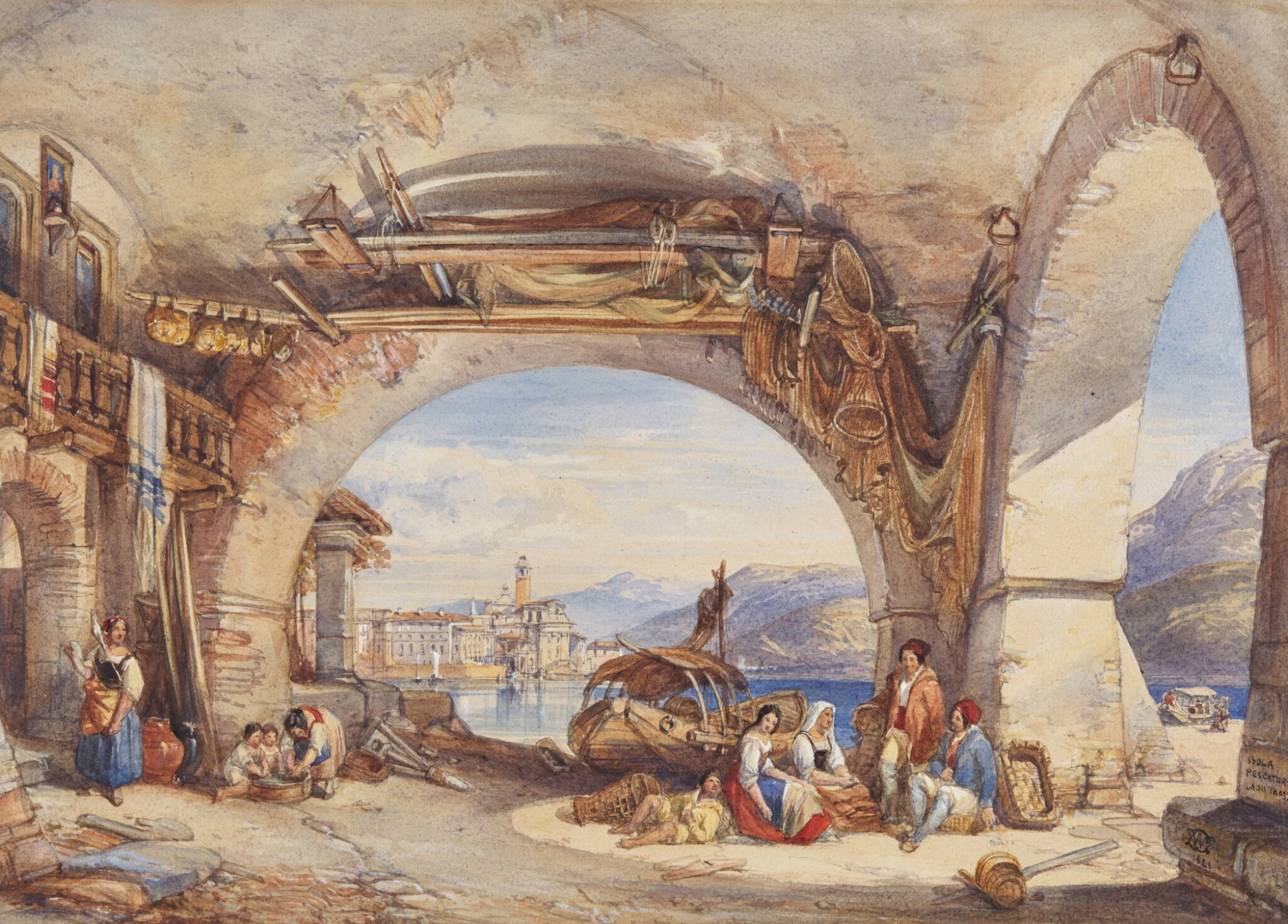
Isola Bella from the Pisentore, Lake Maggiore, c. 1850

Leitch was born in Glasgow, the son of a soldier who had previously been a sailor. Leitch soon developed a strong inclination for art, and used to practise drawing at night with David Macnee, afterwards president of the Scottish Academy. After a good general education, he found employment in a lawyer's office, then as a weaver, then as an apprentice to a Mr. Harbut, house-painter and decorator.

In 1824 he was engaged as a scene-painter at the Theatre Royal, Glasgow, and married Susannah Smellie, who bore him five sons and two daughters. The theatre failing, he spent two years at Mauchline, painting snuff boxes, and then moved to London, where he made the acquaintance of artists David Roberts and Clarkson Stanfield, and obtained employment as a scene-painter at the Queen's Theatre (now demolished) on Charlotte Street. He had some lessons from Copley Fielding, and was employed by Mr. Anderden, a stockbroker, to make drawings for a work he was writing.

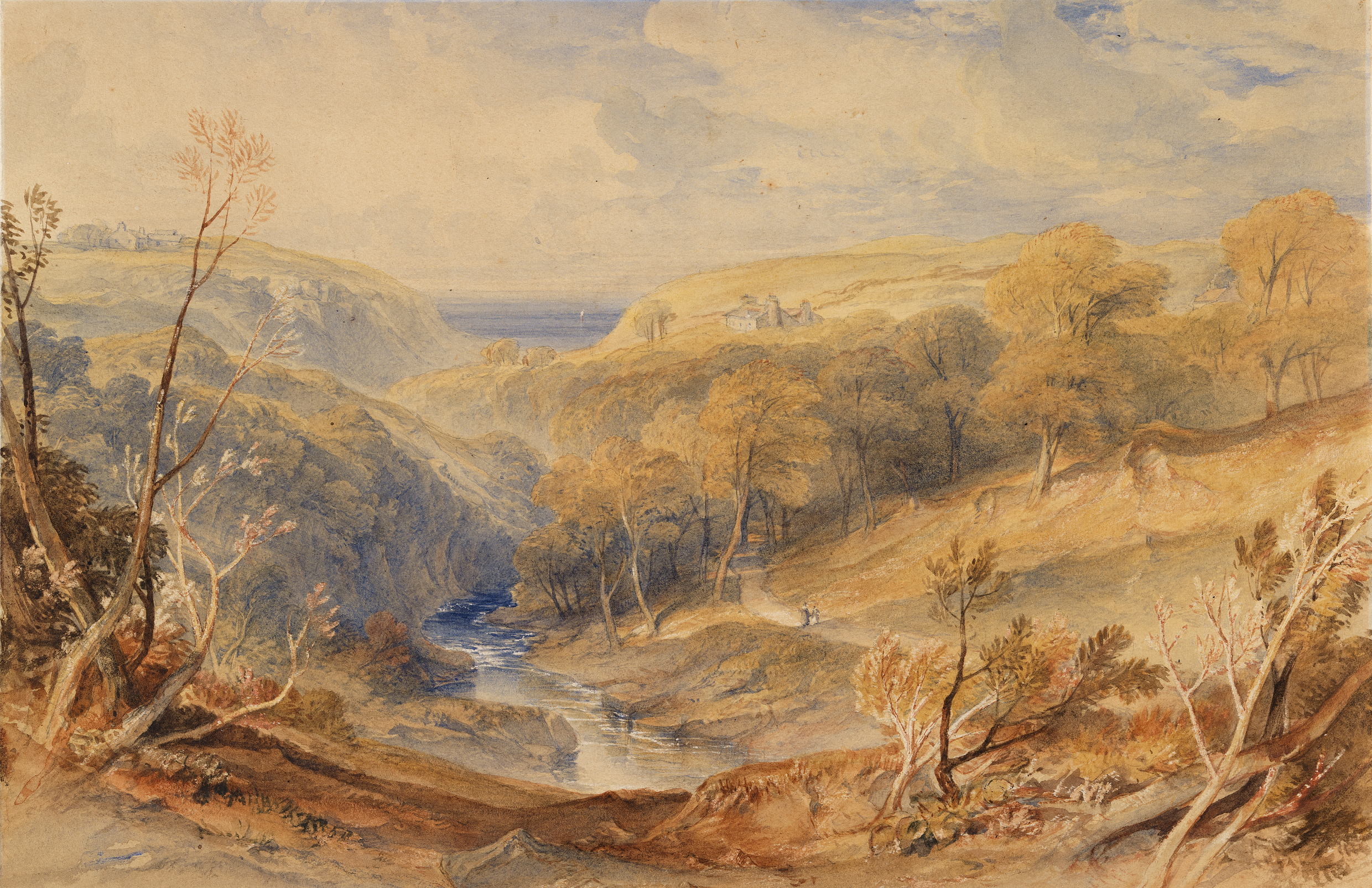
A Wooded Valley on the Isle of Man, National Gallery of Ireland

After exhibiting two drawings at the Society of British Artists in 1832, he travelled to the continent in 1833, passing through the Netherlands, Germany, and Switzerland to Italy. While in Venice he met and became friends with the Hungarian painter, Miklós Barabás; They toured and painted in the Lago Maggiore region in 1834, and Leitch was a great influence on Barabás's future work. After an absence of four years, during which Leitch supported himself mainly by teaching, and had visited the principal cities of Italy, and made numerous sketches there and in Sicily, he returned to London in July 1837.

He now devoted himself almost entirely to teaching and working in watercolours. He had great success as a teacher and could count many members of the aristocracy amongst his pupils. He was introduced to Queen Victoria by Lady Canning and became the drawing master to her majesty and the royal family for 22 years. The Princess of Wales was his last pupil.

Leitch exhibited occasionally at the Royal Academy between 1841 and 1861, but in 1862 was elected a member of the Institute of painters in Watercolours (RI). From that time he contributed regularly to its exhibitions but did not exhibit elsewhere. He served as the society's vice-president for 20 years.

Leitch died in April 1883 at his home in St. John's Wood. A posthumous collection of his works was exhibited at the Institute of Painters in Water Colours' gallery in Piccadilly. Only two of his children survived him. His eldest son, Richard Principal Leitch (1826–1882), was also an artist.

== Work ==
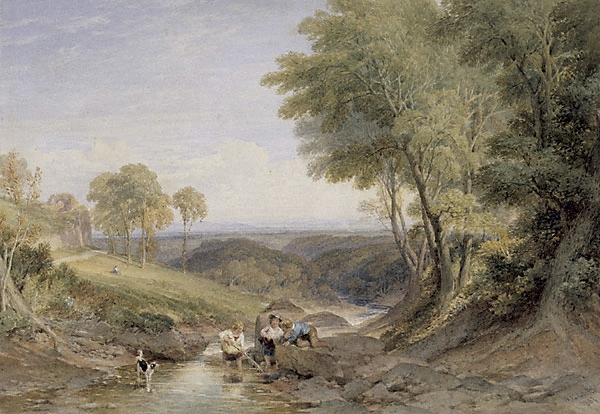
Landscape (1867)

Among the books illustrated with engravings from his drawings are the Rev. Robert Walsh's "Constantinople and the Turkish empire" (1838); George Newenham Wright's "The Rhine, Italy and Greece" (1840), and "Shores and islands of the Mediterranean" (1841), William Brockedon's "Italy" (1843), Sir T. D. Lauder's "Memorial of the royal progress in Scotland" (1843), and John Parker Lawson's "Scotland delineated" (1847–54). The sketches in his possession at his death, with a very few finished drawings and oil pictures, were sold at Christie's in March 1884, and brought upwards of 9,000 pounds.
