= Electoral district of Phillip =

Former state electoral district of New South Wales, Australia

Phillip was an electoral district of the Legislative Assembly in the Australian state of New South Wales, in central Sydney and named after Arthur Phillip. It was originally created in the 1904 re-distribution of electorates following the 1903 New South Wales referendum, which required the number of members of the Legislative Assembly to be reduced from 125 to 90. It consisted of part of the abolished seats of Sydney-Phillip and Darlington. It was initially south of Liverpool Street, east of George Street and City Road, north of Cleveland Street and west of Elizabeth Street. In 1920, with the introduction of proportional representation, it was absorbed into Sydney. Phillip was recreated in 1927 and abolished in 1981 and partly replaced by Elizabeth. From 1973 to 1981 it included Lord Howe Island.

== Members for Phillip ==
First incarnation (1904–1920)
Member	Party	Term
Phillip Sullivan	Labour	1904–1907
Richard Meagher	Independent	1907–1910
Richard Meagher	Labor	1910–1917
Richard Meagher	Independent Labor	1917–1917
John Doyle	Labor	1917–1920
Second incarnation (1927–1981)
Member	Party	Term
Michael Burke	Labor	1927–1930
Tom Shannon	Labor	1930–1940
Tom Shannon	Labor (N-C)	1940–1941
Tom Shannon	Labor	1941–1954
Pat Hills	Labor	1954–1981

== Election results ==
1978 New South Wales state election: Phillip
Party	Candidate	Votes	%	±%
Labor	Pat Hills	18,450	72.4	+2.9
Liberal	Philip Daley	4,873	19.1	−3.5
Communist	Judy Mundey	1,262	5.0	−0.7
Socialist Workers	Gordon Adler	895	3.5	+1.3
Total formal votes		25,480	96.1	−0.8
Informal votes		1,043	3.9	+0.8
Turnout		26,523	85.2	+0.8
Two-party-preferred result
Labor	Pat Hills	20,320	79.7	+3.7
Liberal	Philip Daley	5,160	20.3	−3.7
Labor hold		Swing	+3.7	
