= Electoral district of Elizabeth (New South Wales) =

Former state electoral district of New South Wales, Australia

Elizabeth was an electoral district of the Legislative Assembly in the Australian state of New South Wales, created in 1981, partly replacing Phillip, and including central Sydney and nearby suburbs, alongside Lord Howe Island. It was abolished at the following redistribution in 1988 and largely replaced by the district of McKell.

== Members for Elizabeth ==
| Member | Party | Period |
|---|---|---|
| Pat Hills | Labor | 1981–1988 |

== Election results ==
1981 New South Wales state election: Elizabeth
| Party | Candidate | Votes | % | ±% |
|---|---|---|---|---|
| Labor | Pat Hills | 18,563 | 77.0 | +4.6 |
| Liberal | John Davison | 3,420 | 14.2 | −4.9 |
| Communist | Aileen Beaver | 2,115 | 8.8 | +3.8 |
| Total formal votes | | 24,098 | 93.4 | |
| Informal votes | | 1,689 | 6.6 | |
| Turnout | | 25,787 | 82.6 | |
Two-party-preferred result
| Labor | Pat Hills | 20,063 | 84.7 | +3.3 |
| Liberal | John Davison | 3,620 | 15.3 | −3.3 |
| Labor notional hold | | Swing | +3.3 | |
