= Phillip Sullivan =

Australian politician

Phillip Hurley Sullivan (1858 – 4 December 1921) was an Australian politician.

Sullivan was born in Sydney to master mariner Daniel Santry Sullivan and Margaret Hurley. He became a solicitor's clerk in 1877 and was admitted as a solicitor in 1882. Around 1895 he married Helen Scougall, with whom he would have seven children.

In 1901 he was elected to the New South Wales Legislative Assembly as the Labor member for Darlington. He shifted seats to Phillip in 1904, and was defeated in 1907. Sullivan died in Manly in 1921.

New South Wales Legislative Assembly
Preceded by Thomas Clarke	Member for Darlington; 1901–1904	Abolished
New seat	Member for Phillip; 1904–1907	Succeeded by Richard Meagher
