= Electoral district of Darlington (New South Wales) =

Former state electoral district of New South Wales, Australia

Darlington was an electoral district of the Legislative Assembly in the Australian state of New South Wales, named after the inner Sydney suburb of Darlington. It was first created in 1894 and abolished in 1904.

== History ==
Prior to 1894, the suburb of Darlington was part of the Redfern which returned four members. Multi-member constituencies were abolished in the 1893 redistribution, resulting in the creation of 76 new districts, including Darlington. Redfern was reduced in size and parts were given to the new districts of Darlington and Waterloo. The district was proposed to be called Redfern West, before the name Darlington was chosen. The suburb was regarded as a slum and was the most densely populated suburb of Sydney.

Darlington was abolished in 1904 as a result of the 1903 New South Wales referendum which reduced the number of members of the Legislative Assembly from 125 to 90 and was largely absorbed by the new districts of Phillip and Camperdown.

== Members for Darlington ==
Member	Party	Term
William Schey	Independent Labour	1894–1895
William Schey	Protectionist	1895–1898
Thomas Clarke	Free Trade	1898–1901
Thomas Clarke	Liberal Reform	1901
Phillip Sullivan	Labour	1901–1904

== Election results ==
1901 New South Wales state election: Darlington
Party	Candidate	Votes	%	±%
Labour	Phillip Sullivan	1,194	51.9	
Liberal Reform	Thomas Clarke	1,074	46.7	1.3
Socialist Labor	John Neill	33	1.4	
Total formal votes		2,301	99.3	−0.1
Informal votes		17	0.7	+0.1
Turnout		2,318	64.5	+3.6
Labour gain from Liberal Reform				
