= William Leitch (footballer) =

Tasmanian footballer, businessman and sports administrator

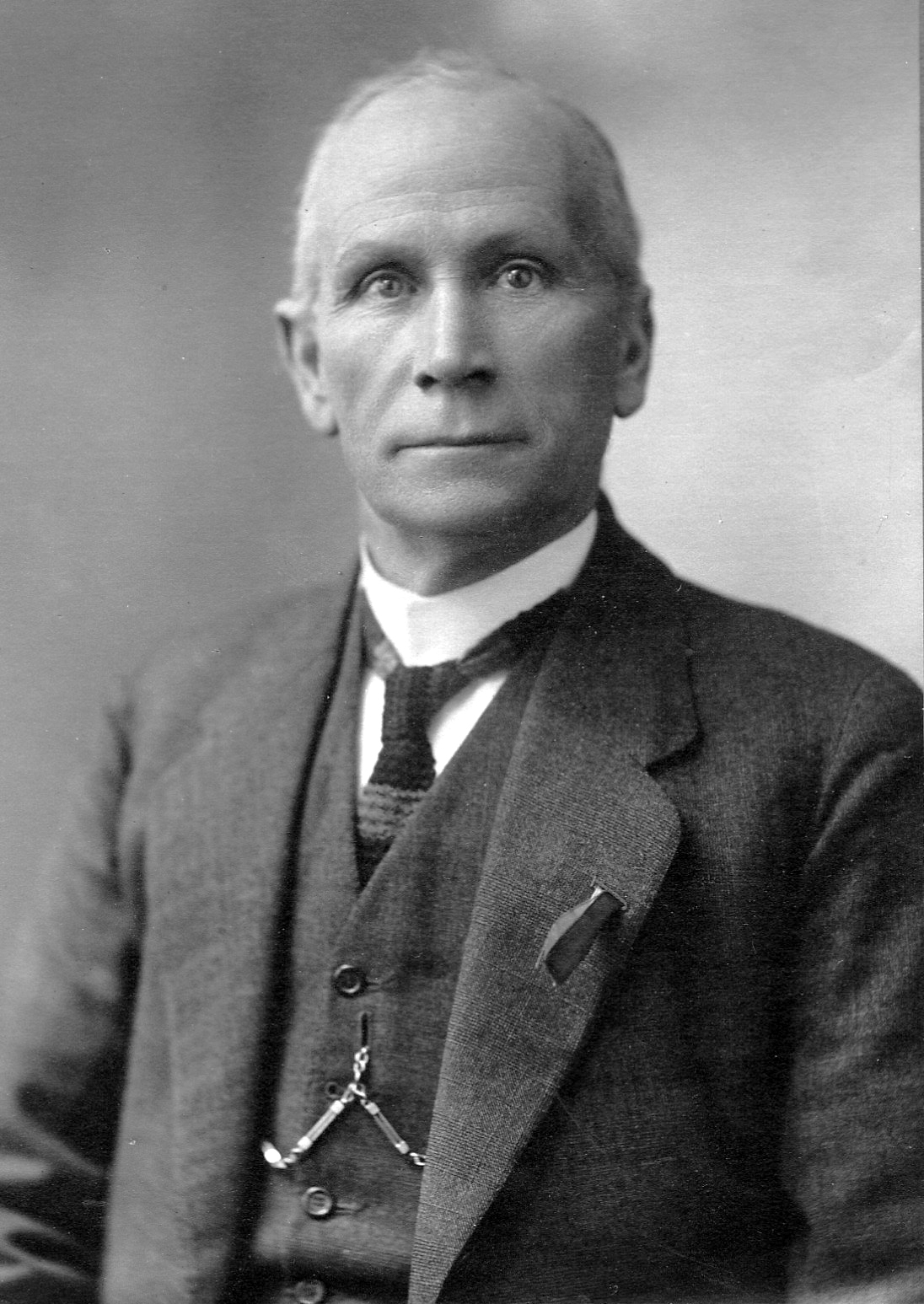
William Douglas Leitch c. 1924

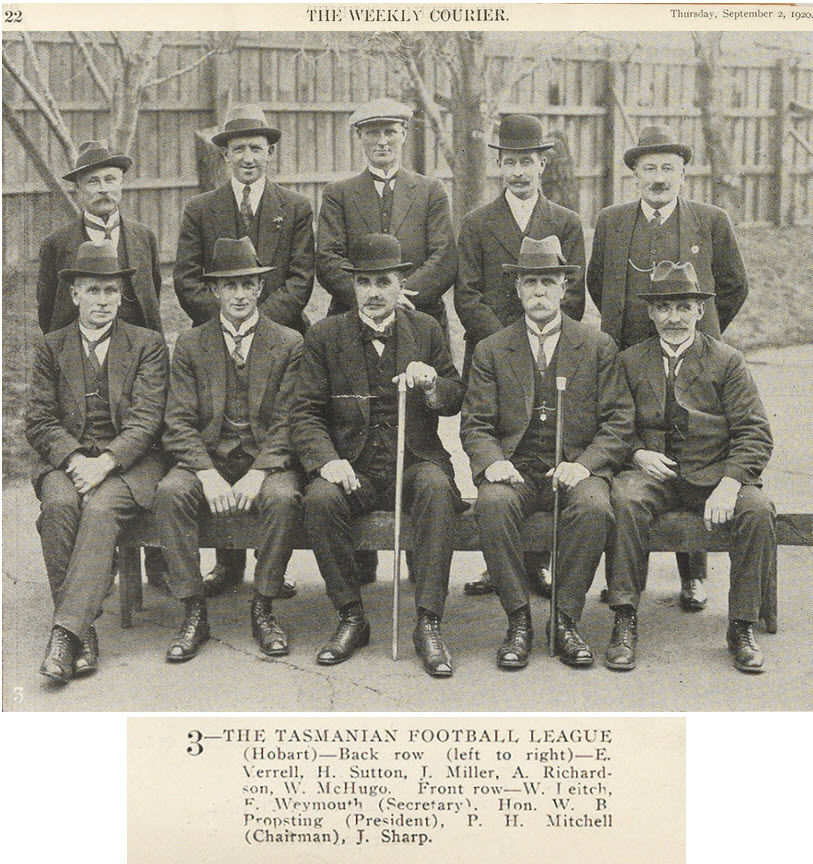
Tasmania Football League Committee c. 1920

William Douglas Leitch (16 December 1863 – 24 May 1943 ), born in Hobart, Tasmania to Scottish settlers John Leitch and Jean McCrone from Paisley, Renfrewshire, was a Tasmanian footballer, businessman and sports administrator. Leitch was an employee and later board of directors member of Henry Jones's IXL jam manufacturing business; taking his first job at the company at the age of only ten alongside Sir Henry Jones placing labels on jam tins, and working there until his death, he gave almost seventy years continuous service. Many of his sons would also have careers working for the firm during their lifetimes.

In his youth Leitch was a highly regarded Australian rules football player at the Railway Football Club. In later life he was a patron of Australian rules football in Tasmania, and was a long-time Tasmanian delegate to the Australian National Football Council. The William Leitch Medal for the fairest and best player in the Tasmanian Australian National Football League was named in his honour.

He was married to Jane Littlejohn (1865 - 1948) at Chalmers Free Church on 17 September 1884, with whom he had 13 children; Elsie May (1883 - 1949), William Douglas (1885 - 1919), John Stanley George (1886 - 1962), Gilbert Barry (1888 - 1972), Dorothy (1890 - 1976), Daniel (1891 - 1891), Edith Isabel (1893 - 1978), Elvira Jean (1894 - 1982), Olive Mary Ruth (1896 - 1946), Winifred Jane (1898 - 1987), Ronald Bruce (1901 - 1966), Allan McDonald (1902 - 1976), and Basil James (1907 - 1974).

One of his sons, Allan McDonald Leitch, was also an inductee of the Tasmanian Football Hall of Fame, having played for New Town and later Carlton.

William Leitch died at his home on Arthur Street, North Hobart on 24 May 1943. His remains were cremated at the Cornelian Bay Crematorium chapel.
