= Thomas Clarke (Australian politician) =

Australian politician and businessman (1846 – 1922)

Thomas Clarke JP

Member of the New South Wales Parliament for Darlington
- In office 27 July 1898 – 11 June 1901
- Preceded by: William Schey
- Succeeded by: Phillip Sullivan

Mayor of Redfern
- In office 12 February 1890 – 12 February 1891
- Preceded by: John Crowe
- Succeeded by: John Beveridge
- In office 13 October 1898 – 7 February 1900
- Preceded by: Edwin Berry
- Succeeded by: Henry Vernon

Alderman on the Redfern Municipal Council
- In office February 1887 – February 1906
- Constituency: Golden Grove Ward

Personal details
- Born: 1846 County Fermanagh, Ireland, United Kingdom
- Died: 28 December 1922 (aged 75–76) Hazelbrook, New South Wales, Australia
- Party: Free Trade Party; Liberal Reform Party

Thomas Clarke JP (1846 – 28 December 1922) was an Australian politician and businessman who served several terms as Mayor of Redfern.

== Early life ==
Clark was born to a Methodist family in 1846 in County Fermanagh, Ireland, and emigrated to the Colony of New South Wales in 1861. He commenced business as a commercial agent and produce merchant in Sydney and entered politics when he was elected as an Alderman on the first Broughton Vale Municipal Council on 19 June 1871.

Clarke was first elected to serve on Redfern Municipal Council in February 1887 for Golden Grove Ward. He rose to become mayor on two occasions, from February 1890 to February 1891 and from October 1898 to February 1900.

== Later life and career ==
Clarke first stood for the NSW Parliament at the 1895 election as a Free Trade candidate for Darlington, but was unsuccessful. He was eventually elected to the New South Wales Legislative Assembly for Darlington in 1898 as a Free Trader, and sat after federation as a member of the Liberal Reform Party. However he was defeated at the following election in 1901. Clarke continued to serve on Redfern Council until his retirement in February 1906. For thirty-five years, Clarke operated as a commission agent on Sussex Street, Sydney, but retired owing to ill health a few years before his death. In 1902 The Catholic Press reported that Clarke had been elected a vice-president of the Orange Order in Sydney, noting: "Can any of our readers inform us whether this is the same Tom Clarke, potato-seller, of Sussex-street, whom many Catholics of Golden Grove helped to return to Parliament a few years ago? If so, what do his old Catholic supporters and fellow-aldermen think of the Christian gratitude of Alderman T. Clarke?."

He died at his residence, 'The Willows' (which he had owned since at least 1907 and after 1914 joint-owned with his brother Sydney), in Hazelbrook on 28 December 1922 aged 74, with his obituary noting that he "was a popular figure in Redfern, in the affairs of which he always took a deep and active interest." Survived by his wife, Susanna Robinson (d. 1924), he was buried in the family plot at Lawson Cemetery alongside his son Sydney Charles Adam Clarke (1881–1922) who had predeceased him by two months.

Civic offices
Preceded by John Crowe	Mayor of Redfern; 1890–1891	Succeeded by John Beveridge
Preceded by Edwin Berry	Mayor of Redfern; 1898–1900	Succeeded by Henry Vernon
New South Wales Legislative Assembly
Preceded by William Schey	Member for Darlington; 1898–1901	Succeeded by Phillip Sullivan
