= Pat Hills =

Australian politician (1917–1992)

The Honourable Pat Hills AO
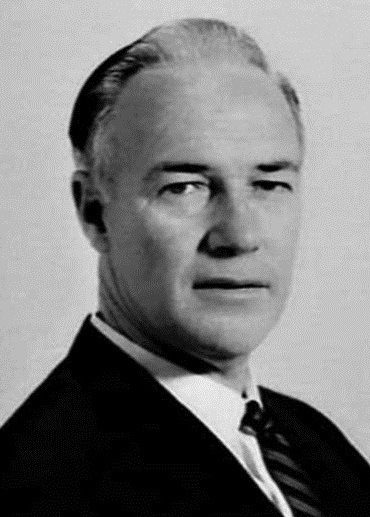

6th Deputy Premier of New South Wales
- In office 30 April 1964 – 13 May 1965
- Premier: Jack Renshaw
- Preceded by: Jack Renshaw
- Succeeded by: Charles Cutler

22nd Leader of the Opposition of New South Wales Elections: 1971, 1973
- In office 2 December 1968 – 17 November 1973
- Deputy: Syd Einfeld
- Preceded by: Jack Renshaw
- Succeeded by: Neville Wran

68th Lord Mayor of Sydney
- In office 9 December 1952 – 30 November 1956
- Deputy: Frank Green; Kevin Dwyer; Anthony Doherty
- Preceded by: Ernest Charles O'Dea
- Succeeded by: Harry Jensen

Alderman of the Sydney City Council
- In office 4 December 1948 – 4 December 1953
- Constituency: Flinders Ward
- In office 5 December 1953 – 30 November 1956
- Constituency: City Ward

Personal details
- Born: Patrick Darcy Hills; 31 December 1917 Surry Hills, New South Wales, Australia
- Died: 22 April 1992 (aged 74) Sydney, Australia
- Resting place: Northern Suburbs Memorial Gardens
- Party: Labor
- Spouse: Stella Steele Hills

Patrick Darcy Hills AO (31 December 1917 – 22 April 1992) was an Australian politician. He served in various high offices across the state most notably the Deputy Premier of New South Wales, Leader of the Opposition and as the Lord Mayor of Sydney.

== Early life ==
Hills was born in the Sydney suburb of Surry Hills. He was educated at Marist Brothers High School, Darlinghurst and was apprenticed as an electrical engineer.

He was an alderman on Sydney City Council from 1948 to 1956 and Lord Mayor of Sydney from 1953 to 1956, during which time he was fooled into carrying a fake Olympic torch.

== Political career ==
Hills was elected to the New South Wales Legislative Assembly as the member for Phillip in 1954, representing the Labor Party; he held the seat till its abolition in 1981. Then, until 1988, he served as member for Elizabeth.

He was Minister for Local Government in the cabinet of Premier Robert Heffron (1959–1964). When Heffron retired in April 1964, Hills and Deputy Premier Jack Renshaw were considered the most likely successors, but his relative youth and manner compared to Renshaw was seen as an obstacle, as an article in The Bulletin noted: "Hills, who rose rapidly in the parliamentary party under the patronage of the late Joe Cahill, lists in “Who's Who" one of his hobbies as "study of local government administration", a demonstration of his essential dourness. He has the vice, for a politician, of not suffering fools gladly and it is this that feeds a habit of arrogance which has made him many unnecessary enemies."

In any event, Hills did not contest the leadership in the caucus ballot held on 29 April 1964, and Renshaw was elected leader and premier unopposed. Hills did however contest for the deputy leadership and deputy premiership, and was successful 33 votes to 19 against health minister Bill Sheahan.

Hills became deputy opposition leader after Labor lost to the Bob Askin-led Coalition. He became state Labor leader, and hence opposition leader, in 1968 after Renshaw stood down. At the 1971 and 1973 state elections he was narrowly defeated by Askin. He stood down as leader in 1973, making him the first NSW Labor leader in decades to have never served as premier.

During his long Parliamentary service of 34 years, Hills served terms as Deputy Premier and as Minister in a number of portfolios including Local Government, Highways, Mines, Energy, Industrial Relations, Technology, Roads and Employment. In opposition he served as Deputy Leader for three years and Leader for five years. His many notable initiatives and achievements as a Minister include the Sydney to Newcastle Highway, the construction of the Gladesville Bridge and establishment of the State Planning Authority now known as the NSW Department of Planning. One of his major achievements was the building of the Eraring and Bayswater power stations. He has been accused of sabotaging the 1948 Cumberland County Plan for Sydney, "flogging the green belt out the back door before the ink was dry".

== Later life and career ==
He served as a member of the Sydney Cricket Ground and Sports Ground Trust from July 1961 to December 1989, and was Chairman of the Trust during its significant expansion period from 1977 to 1989. Until John Robertson's resignation in 2014, Hills was the only New South Wales Labor Leader not to have been premier since 1923.

Hills died in Sydney and was cremated with his ashes interred at Northern Suburbs Memorial Gardens.

== Honours ==
Hills was made an Officer of the Order of Australia (AO) in the 1988 Australia Day Honours.

The suburb of Hillsdale, New South Wales is named after Hills.

Government offices
Preceded by William Parker Henson	Chairman of the Sydney County Council; 1952–1953	Succeeded by Reginald Arthur Triggs
Civic offices
Preceded by Ernest Charles O'Dea	Lord Mayor of Sydney; 1952 – 1956	Succeeded by Harry Jensen
New South Wales Legislative Assembly
Preceded by Tom Shannon	Member for Phillip; 1954 – 1981	District abolished
New district	Member for Elizabeth; 1981 – 1988	District abolished
Political offices
Preceded by Jack Renshaw	Minister for Local Government; 1959 – 1965	Succeeded by Pat Morton
Preceded by Jack Renshaw	Minister for Highways; 1959 – 1965	Succeeded by Pat Morton
Preceded by Jack Renshaw	Deputy Premier of New South Wales; 1964 – 1965	Succeeded by Charles Cutler
Preceded by Jack Renshaw	Leader of the Opposition of New South Wales; 1968 – 1973	Succeeded by Neville Wran
Preceded by George Freudenstein	Minister for Mines; 1976 – 1978	Succeeded by Ron Mulock as Minister for Mineral Resources and Development
Preceded by George Freudenstein	Minister for Energy; 1976 – 1981	Succeeded by Paul Landa
Preceded by Paul Landa	Minister for Industrial Relations; 1976 – 1988	Succeeded by John Fahey as Minister for Industrial Relations and Employment
New title	Minister for Technology; 1978 – 1980	Succeeded by Ron Mulock
Preceded by Ron Mulock	Minister for Technology; 1981 – 1984	Succeeded by George Paciullo
Preceded by George Paciullo	Minister for Roads; 1984	Succeeded by Laurie Brereton
Preceded by Bob Debus	Minister for Employment; 1986 – 1988	Succeeded by John Fahey as Minister for Industrial Relations and Employment
Party political offices
Preceded by Jack Renshaw	Deputy Leader of the Australian Labor Party (NSW Branch); 1964 – 1968	Succeeded by Syd Einfeld
Preceded by Jack Renshaw	Leader of the Australian Labor Party (NSW Branch); 1968 – 1973	Succeeded by Neville Wran
