= Electoral results for the Division of West Sydney =

Australian division election results

This is a list of electoral results for the Division of West Sydney in Australian federal elections from the division's creation in 1901 until its abolition in 1969.

== Members ==
Member	Party	Term
Billy Hughes	Labour	1901—1916
Billy Hughes	Nationalist	1916—1917
Con Wallace	Labor	1917—1919
T. J. Ryan	Labor	1919—1921
William Lambert	Labor	1921—1928
Jack Beasley	Labor	1928—1931
Jack Beasley	Labor (NSW)	1931—1936
Jack Beasley	Labor	1936—1940
Jack Beasley	Labor (N-C)	1940—1941
Jack Beasley	Labor	1941—1946
William O'Connor	Labor	1946—1949
Dan Minogue	Labor	1949—1969

== Election results ==
=== Elections in the 1960s ===
==== 1966 ====
1966 Australian federal election: West Sydney
Party	Candidate	Votes	%	±%
Labor	Dan Minogue	15,823	61.8	−13.5
Liberal	Albert Curtin	6,908	27.0	+27.0
Democratic Labor	Denise Clancy	1,770	6.9	−11.1
Communist	Ron Maxwell	1,115	4.4	+4.4
Total formal votes		25,616	94.1	
Informal votes		1,593	5.9	
Turnout		27,209	91.4	
Two-party-preferred result
Labor	Dan Minogue		66.9	−11.2
Liberal	Albert Curtin		33.1	+33.1
Labor hold		Swing	−11.2	

==== 1963 ====
1963 Australian federal election: West Sydney
Party	Candidate	Votes	%	±%
Labor	Dan Minogue	22,051	74.3	+3.9
Democratic Labor	William Doherty	5,352	18.0	+8.6
Independent	Maurice Law	1,464	4.9	+4.9
New Guinea	Charles Kilduff	813	2.7	+2.7
Total formal votes		29,680	95.6	
Informal votes		1,371	4.4	
Turnout		31,051	89.9	
Two-party-preferred result
Labor	Dan Minogue		78.1	+7.7
Democratic Labor	William Doherty		21.9	+21.9
Labor hold		Swing	+7.7	

==== 1961 ====
1961 Australian federal election: West Sydney
Party	Candidate	Votes	%	±%
Labor	Dan Minogue	21,937	70.4	+4.7
Liberal	Milovan Kovjanic	4,555	14.6	−4.4
Democratic Labor	William Doherty	2,927	9.4	−1.5
Communist	Ron Maxwell	1,746	5.6	+1.3
Total formal votes		31,165	95.5	
Informal votes		1,477	4.5	
Turnout		32,642	91.1	
Two-party-preferred result
Labor	Dan Minogue		76.5	+4.9
Liberal	Milovan Kovjanic		24.5	−4.9
Labor hold		Swing	+4.9	

=== Elections in the 1950s ===
==== 1958 ====
1958 Australian federal election: West Sydney
Party	Candidate	Votes	%	±%
Labor	Dan Minogue	22,610	65.7	−8.0
Liberal	Adrian Cook	6,535	19.0	−1.2
Democratic Labor	Allan Charlesworth	3,763	10.9	+10.9
Communist	Lance Sharkey	1,489	4.3	+4.3
Total formal votes		34,397	94.8	
Informal votes		1,892	5.2	
Turnout		36,289	90.8	
Two-party-preferred result
Labor	Dan Minogue		71.6	−7.7
Liberal	Adrian Cook		28.4	+7.7
Labor hold		Swing	−7.7	

==== 1955 ====
1955 Australian federal election: West Sydney
Party	Candidate	Votes	%	±%
Labor	Dan Minogue	28,309	73.7	−1.1
Liberal	Frank Weaver	7,751	20.2	+1.1
Communist	Lance Sharkey	2,364	6.2	+0.1
Total formal votes		38,424	95.4	
Informal votes		1,853	4.6	
Turnout		40,277	92.4	
Two-party-preferred result
Labor	Dan Minogue		79.3	−1.0
Liberal	Frank Waver		20.7	+1.0
Labor hold		Swing	−1.0	

==== 1954 ====
1954 Australian federal election: West Sydney
Party	Candidate	Votes	%	±%
Labor	Dan Minogue	21,226	72.5	+9.1
Independent	Anthony Micallef	6,264	21.4	+21.4
Communist	Lance Sharkey	1,776	6.1	−4.3
Total formal votes		29,266	95.3	
Informal votes		1,432	4.7	
Turnout		30,698	93.0	
Two-party-preferred result
Labor	Dan Minogue		78.0	+3.4
Independent	Anthony Micallef		22.0	−3.4
Labor hold		Swing	+3.4	

==== 1951 ====
1951 Australian federal election: West Sydney
Party	Candidate	Votes	%	±%
Labor	Dan Minogue	21,123	63.4	+13.6
Liberal	Basil Mottershead	8,203	24.6	+4.3
Communist	Jack Miles	3,483	10.4	+5.4
Independent Labor	Clare Peters	528	1.6	+1.6
Total formal votes		33,337	96.2	
Informal votes		1,300	3.8	
Turnout		34,637	91.9	
Two-party-preferred result
Labor	Dan Minogue		74.6	+18.9
Liberal	Basil Mottershead		25.4	+25.4
Labor hold		Swing	+18.9	

=== Elections in the 1940s ===
==== 1949 ====
1949 Australian federal election: West Sydney
Party	Candidate	Votes	%	±%
Labor	Dan Minogue	17,732	49.8	−18.2
Lang Labor	Horace Foley	8,872	24.9	+16.6
Liberal	Basil Mottershead	7,235	20.3	+1.2
Communist	Stan Moran	1,786	5.0	+0.4
Total formal votes		35,625	96.8	
Informal votes		1,168	3.2	
Turnout		36,793	91.3	
Two-party-preferred result
Labor	Dan Minogue		55.7	−21.7
Lang Labor	Horace Foley		44.3	+21.7
Labor hold		Swing	−21.7	

==== 1946 ====
1946 Australian federal election: West Sydney
Party	Candidate	Votes	%	±%
Labor	William O'Connor	29,417	56.6	−13.1
Lang Labor	Thomas Ryan	7,671	14.8	+14.8
Liberal	John Mant	6,300	12.1	+12.1
Communist	Stan Moran	4,380	8.4	+8.4
Protestant People	Ronald Sarina	2,162	4.2	+4.2
Independent	Malinda Ivey	2,063	4.0	+4.0
Total formal votes		51,993	94.8	
Informal votes		2,829	5.2	
Turnout		54,822	91.9	
Two-party-preferred result
Labor	William O'Connor		77.4	−1.8
Lang Labor	Thomas Ryan		22.6	+22.6
Labor hold		Swing	−1.8	

==== 1943 ====
1943 Australian federal election: West Sydney
Party	Candidate	Votes	%	±%
Labor	Jack Beasley	34,404	69.7	+47.7
State Labor	Horace Foley	9,166	18.6	+14.5
One Parliament	Eddington Sherwood	4,481	9.1	+9.1
Independent	Malinda Ivey	957	1.9	+1.9
Soldiers Labor	William McCristal	352	0.7	+0.7
Total formal votes		49,360	96.6	
Informal votes		1,748	3.4	
Turnout		51,108	94.9	
Two-party-preferred result
Labor	Jack Beasley		79.2	+43.5
State Labor	Horace Foley		20.8	+20.8
Labor gain from Labor (N-C)		Swing	+43.5	

==== 1940 ====
1940 Australian federal election: West Sydney
Party	Candidate	Votes	%	±%
Labor (N-C)	Jack Beasley	30,570	62.8	+62.8
Labor	Henry Mulcahy	10,714	22.0	−78.0
Independent	Malinda Ivey	2,937	6.0	+6.0
Independent	Stan Moran	2,470	5.1	+5.1
State Labor	Peter Burke	1,983	4.1	+4.1
Total formal votes		48,674	94.9	
Informal votes		2,610	5.1	
Turnout		51,284	92.7	
Two-party-preferred result
Labor (N-C)	Jack Beasley		64.3	+64.3
Labor	Henry Mulcahy		35.7	−64.3
Labor (N-C) gain from Labor		Swing	+64.3	

=== Elections in the 1930s ===
==== 1937 ====
1937 Australian federal election: West Sydney
Party	Candidate	Votes	%	±%
Labor	Jack Beasley	unopposed		
Labor gain from Labor (NSW)		Swing		

==== 1934 ====
1934 Australian federal election: West Sydney
Party	Candidate	Votes	%	±%
Labor (NSW)	Jack Beasley	32,283	63.5	+7.9
United Australia	Henry Wood	11,160	22.0	−0.9
Labor	Clarrie Campbell	3,398	6.7	−13.0
Social Credit	Frederick Taylor	2,529	5.0	+5.0
Communist	Robert Brechin	1,460	2.9	+1.7
Total formal votes		50,830	95.2	
Informal votes		2,571	4.8	
Turnout		53,401	95.1	
Two-party-preferred result
Labor (NSW)	Jack Beasley		73.7	+1.9
United Australia	Henry Wood		26.3	−1.9
Labor (NSW) hold		Swing	+1.9	

==== 1931 ====
1931 Australian federal election: West Sydney
Party	Candidate	Votes	%	±%
Labor (NSW)	Jack Beasley	19,768	63.9	+63.9
United Australia	Arthur Butterell	6,579	21.3	+7.8
Labor	James Donaldson	4,596	14.9	−71.6
Total formal votes		30,943	95.8	
Informal votes		1,372	4.2	
Turnout		32,315	92.2	
Two-party-preferred result
Labor (NSW)	Jack Beasley		75.1	+75.1
United Australia	Arthur Butterell		24.9	+11.4
Labor (NSW) gain from Labor		Swing	+11.4	

=== Elections in the 1920s ===
==== 1929 ====
1929 Australian federal election: West Sydney
Party	Candidate	Votes	%	±%
Labor	Jack Beasley	28,121	86.5	+4.8
Nationalist	Lindsay Thompson	4,404	13.5	−4.8
Total formal votes		32,525	97.1	
Informal votes		973	2.9	
Turnout		33,498	94.2	
Labor hold		Swing	+4.8	

==== 1928 ====
1928 Australian federal election: West Sydney
Party	Candidate	Votes	%	±%
Labor	Jack Beasley	25,286	81.7	+7.7
Nationalist	Alfred Benjamin	5,649	18.3	−7.7
Total formal votes		30,935	94.1	
Informal votes		1,930	5.9	
Turnout		32,865	91.4	
Labor hold		Swing	+7.7	

==== 1925 ====
1925 Australian federal election: West Sydney
Party	Candidate	Votes	%	±%
Labor	William Lambert	24,604	74.0	+0.1
Nationalist	Lindsay Thompson	8,634	26.0	+26.0
Total formal votes		33,238	97.4	
Informal votes		885	2.6	
Turnout		34,123	87.0	
Labor hold		Swing	−1.4	

==== 1922 ====
1922 Australian federal election: West Sydney
Party	Candidate	Votes	%	±%
Labor	William Lambert	13,359	73.9	−3.8
Protestant Labour	Thomas Bryde	3,631	20.1	+20.1
Majority Labor	Arthur O'Donnell	1,077	6.0	+6.0
Total formal votes		18,067	94.3	
Informal votes		1,102	5.7	
Turnout		19,169	47.7	
Two-party-preferred result
Labor	William Lambert		75.4	−2.3
Independent Labor	Thomas Bryde		24.6	+24.6
Labor hold		Swing	−2.3	

1921 West Sydney by-election
Party	Candidate	Votes	%	±%
Labor	William Lambert	7,857	57.3	−14.9
Nationalist	Alfred Henry	5,237	38.2	+10.4
Independent Labor	William McCristal	430	3.1	+3.1
Taxpayers' Association	John Powell	186	1.4	+1.4
Total formal votes		13,710	95.8	
Informal votes		606	4.2	
Turnout		14,316	45.3	
Two-party-preferred result
Labor	William Lambert		59.6	−12.6
Nationalist	Alfred Henry		40.4	+12.6
Labor hold		Swing	−12.6	

=== Elections in the 1910s ===
==== 1919 ====
1919 Australian federal election: West Sydney
Party	Candidate	Votes	%	±%
Labor	Thomas Ryan	14,234	72.2	+5.7
Nationalist	Richard Sleath	5,488	27.8	−5.7
Total formal votes		19,722	96.4	
Informal votes		738	3.6	
Turnout		20,460	66.7	
Labor hold		Swing	+5.7	

==== 1917 ====
1917 Australian federal election: West Sydney
Party	Candidate	Votes	%	±%
Labor	Con Wallace	14,664	66.5	−8.8
Nationalist	Gideon Gillespie	7,389	33.5	+8.8
Total formal votes		22,053	96.8	
Informal votes		739	3.2	
Turnout		22,792	63.4	
Labor hold		Swing	−8.8	

==== 1914 ====
1914 Australian federal election: West Sydney
Party	Candidate	Votes	%	±%
Labor	Billy Hughes	15,774	75.3	+4.0
Liberal	Walter Finch	5,187	24.7	−4.0
Total formal votes		20,961	96.6	
Informal votes		731	3.4	
Turnout		21,692	54.8	
Labor hold		Swing	+4.0	

==== 1913 ====
1913 Australian federal election: West Sydney
Party	Candidate	Votes	%	±%
Labor	Billy Hughes	17,658	71.3	-0.0
Liberal	John Sutton	7,119	28.7	+2.9
Total formal votes		24,777	94.6	
Informal votes		1,406	5.4	
Turnout		26,183	64.6	
Labor hold		Swing	−1.5	

==== 1910 ====
1910 Australian federal election: West Sydney
Party	Candidate	Votes	%	±%
Labour	Billy Hughes	13,000	69.8	+14.3
Liberal	Stanley Cole	4,986	26.8	−17.7
Socialist Labor	Harry Holland	628	3.4	+3.4
Total formal votes		18,614	98.2	
Informal votes		341	1.8	
Turnout		18,955	60.7	
Labour hold		Swing	+16.0	

=== Elections in the 1900s ===
==== 1906 ====
1906 Australian federal election: West Sydney
Party	Candidate	Votes	%	±%
Labour	Billy Hughes	7,561	55.5	−14.4
Anti-Socialist	James Burns	6,056	44.5	+14.4
Total formal votes		13,617	96.7	
Informal votes		469	3.3	
Turnout		14,086	50.1	
Labour hold		Swing	−14.4	

==== 1903 ====
1903 Australian federal election: West Sydney
Party	Candidate	Votes	%	±%
Labour	Billy Hughes	7,272	69.9	−3.7
Free Trade	Edward Warren	3,129	30.1	+30.1
Total formal votes		10,403	96.2	
Informal votes		406	3.8	
Turnout		10,809	41.9	
Labour hold		Swing	−5.5	

==== 1901 ====
1901 Australian federal election: West Sydney
Party	Candidate	Votes	%	±%
Labour	Billy Hughes	6,652	73.7	+73.7
Protectionist	James Beer	2,062	22.9	+22.9
Ind. Protectionist	James Hanrahan	307	3.4	+3.4
Total formal votes		9,021	97.0	
Informal votes		279	3.0	
Turnout		9,300	63.4	
Labour win		(new seat)		
