= Deputy Lord Mayor of Sydney =

Government official of Sydney, Australia

- Incumbent; Jess Miller since September 2025
- Appointer: Council of the City of Sydney
- Term length: 4 years, renewable
- Inaugural holder: John James Carroll (Official)
- Formation: 1949 (officially)
- Website: Deputy Lord Mayor of Sydney

The deputy lord mayor of Sydney is the deputy head of the council of the City of Sydney, which is the local government area covering the central business district of Sydney in the State of New South Wales, Australia. Since 1949, the deputy lord mayor has been indirectly elected annually by the council, becoming a permanent council position following the passage of the Local Government (Areas) Act 1948. The holder may be appointed to a full mayoral term or for a shorter, specified duration. The deputy lord mayor assists the lord mayor in their work, exercising any function of the lord mayor at request and fulfilling the role during a casual vacancy of the lord mayor's office. The most recent election was held on 14 September 2024, following which the new council voted first-term councillor, Zann Maxwell, as deputy lord mayor.

== Office history ==
The position of deputy lord mayor was made a permanent council position when the Local Government (Areas) Act 1948 placed the City of Sydney under the main body of local government legislation. Prior to 1 January 1949, "Deputy" Lord Mayors were occasionally elected to act for the council during times of absence or illness of a sitting Lord Mayor, but the position was not permanent under the Sydney Corporation Act 1932 or any previous acts. The following individuals have been elected as Deputy Lord Mayor of the City of Sydney:

#	Portrait	Officeholder	Party	Term start	Term end	Time in office	Ref.	Lord Mayor
1		John James Carroll	Labor	1 January 1949	14 December 1950	1 year, 347 days		Ernest Charles O'Dea
2		Jack Byrne	Labor	14 December 1950	15 December 1952	2 years, 1 day		Ernest Charles O'Dea
3		Frank Green	Labor	15 December 1952	6 January 1954	1 year, 22 days		Pat Hills
4		Kevin Dwyer	Labor	6 January 1954	13 December 1954	341 days		Pat Hills
5		Anthony Doherty	Labor	13 December 1954	12 December 1955	364 days		Pat Hills
(4)		Kevin Dwyer	Labor	12 December 1955	17 December 1956	1 year, 5 days		Pat Hills
(2)		Jack Byrne	Labor	17 December 1956	17 December 1959	3 years, 0 days		Harry Jensen
6		Francis Joseph Dixon	Labor	17 December 1959	11 December 1961	1 year, 359 days		Harry Jensen
7		Henry Burland	Labor	11 December 1961	16 December 1963	2 years, 5 days		Harry Jensen
8		Clifford Noble	Labor	16 December 1963	14 December 1964	364 days		Harry Jensen
(7)		Henry Burland	Labor	14 December 1964	16 December 1965	1 year, 2 days		Harry Jensen
9		Tony Bradford	Labor	16 December 1965	13 November 1967	1 year, 332 days		John Armstrong
10		Nicholas Shehadie	Civic Reform	7 October 1969	24 September 1973	3 years, 352 days		Emmet McDermott
10		Nicholas Shehadie	Civic Reform	7 October 1969	24 September 1973	3 years, 352 days		David Griffin
11		Barrett Lewis	Civic Reform	24 September 1973	30 September 1974	1 year, 6 days		Nicholas Shehadie
12		Leo Port	Civic Reform	30 September 1974	25 September 1975	360 days		Nicholas Shehadie
13		Andrew Briger	Civic Reform	25 September 1975	27 September 1976	1 year, 2 days		Leo Port
(11)		Barrett Lewis	Civic Reform	27 September 1976	10 October 1977	1 year, 13 days		Leo Port
14		Nelson Meers	Civic Reform	10 October 1977	November 1978	1 year, 28 days		Leo Port
15		Jeremy Bingham	Civic Reform	November 1978	20 September 1980	1 year, 318 days		Nelson Meers
(9)		Tony Bradford	Labor	29 September 1980	28 September 1981	364 days		Doug Sutherland
16		Jack Calpis	Labor	28 September 1981	31 December 1981	94 days		Doug Sutherland
17		Bill Hartup	Labor	4 January 1982	13 September 1982	252 days		Doug Sutherland
(9)		Tony Bradford	Labor	13 September 1982	29 September 1983	1 year, 16 days		Doug Sutherland
(16)		Jack Calpis	Labor	29 September 1983	1 May 1984	215 days		Doug Sutherland
18		Stanley Ashmore-Smith	Labor	1 May 1984	16 September 1985	1 year, 138 days		Doug Sutherland
(17)		Bill Hartup	Labor	16 September 1985	26 March 1987	1 year, 191 days		Doug Sutherland
19		Ross Bonthorne	Civic Reform	3 January 1989	18 September 1991	2 years, 258 days		Jeremy Bingham
20		Henry Tsang	Labor	23 September 1991	11 September 1999	7 years, 353 days		Frank Sartor
21		Lucy Turnbull	Living Sydney Independents	18 September 1999	7 April 2003	3 years, 201 days		Frank Sartor
22		Dixie Coulton	Living Sydney Independents	7 April 2003	14 September 2003	305 days		Lucy Turnbull
22		Dixie Coulton	Sydney Independents	14 September 2003	6 February 2004	305 days		Lucy Turnbull
23		John McInerney	Clover Moore; Independent Team	19 April 2004	12 September 2005	1 year, 146 days		Clover Moore
24		Verity Firth	Labor	12 September 2005	18 September 2006	1 year, 6 days		Clover Moore
25		Chris Harris	Greens	18 September 2006	17 September 2007	364 days		Clover Moore
26		Tony Pooley	Labor	17 September 2007	13 September 2008	362 days		Clover Moore
27		Marcelle Hoff	Clover Moore; Independent Team	29 September 2008	21 September 2009	357 days		Clover Moore
28		Phillip Black	Clover Moore; Independent Team	21 September 2009	13 September 2010	357 days		Clover Moore
(27)		Marcelle Hoff	Clover Moore; Independent Team	13 September 2010	19 September 2011	1 year, 6 days		Clover Moore
29		Robert Kok	Clover Moore; Independent Team	19 September 2011	21 September 2012	1 year, 2 days		Clover Moore
30		Robyn Kemmis	Clover Moore; Independent Team	21 September 2012	26 December 2015	3 years, 96 days		Clover Moore
31		Irene Doutney	Greens	29 February 2016	10 September 2016	194 days		Clover Moore
32		Kerryn Phelps	Clover Moore; Independent Team	23 September 2016	27 June 2017	360 days		Clover Moore
32		Kerryn Phelps	Independent	27 June 2017	18 September 2017	360 days		Clover Moore
33		Jess Miller	Clover Moore; Independent Team	18 September 2017	17 September 2018	364 days		Clover Moore
34		Linda Scott	Labor	17 September 2018	9 September 2019	357 days		Clover Moore
35		Jess Scully	Clover Moore; Independent Team	9 September 2019	19 September 2022	3 years, 10 days		Clover Moore
36		Sylvie Ellsmore	Greens	19 September 2022	18 September 2023	364 days		Clover Moore
37		Robert Kok	Clover Moore; Independent Team	18 September 2023	10 October 2024	3 years, 63 days		Clover Moore
38		Zann Maxwell	Labor	10 October 2024	30 September 2025	355 days		Clover Moore
39		Jess Miller	Clover Moore; Independent Team	30 September 2025	Incumbent	1 year, 51 days		Clover Moore
