= 2024 Sydney City Council election =

Election in Sydney, Australia

- 14 September 2024

All 10 councillors on Sydney City Council 5 seats needed for a majority
- Lord Mayor
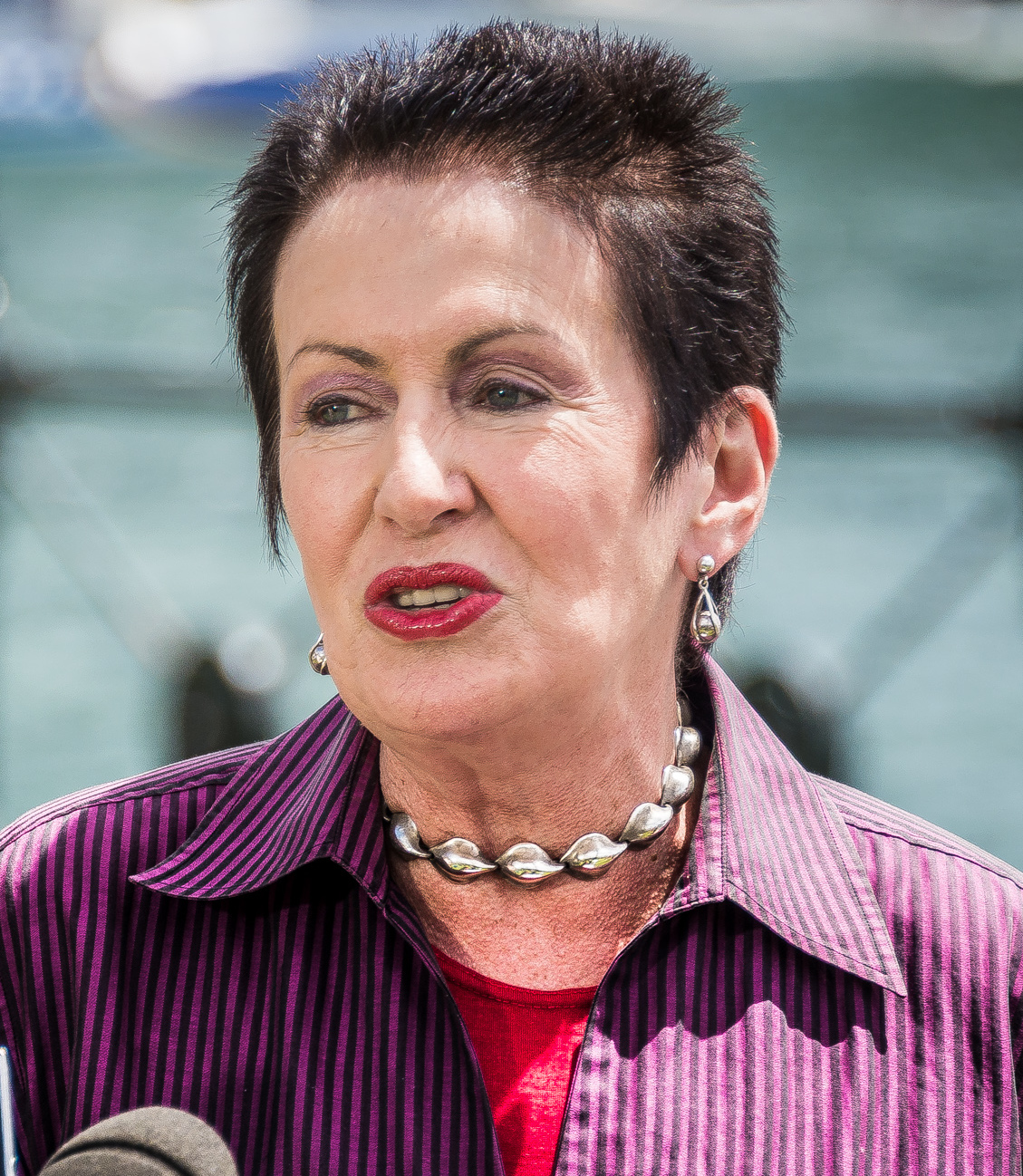

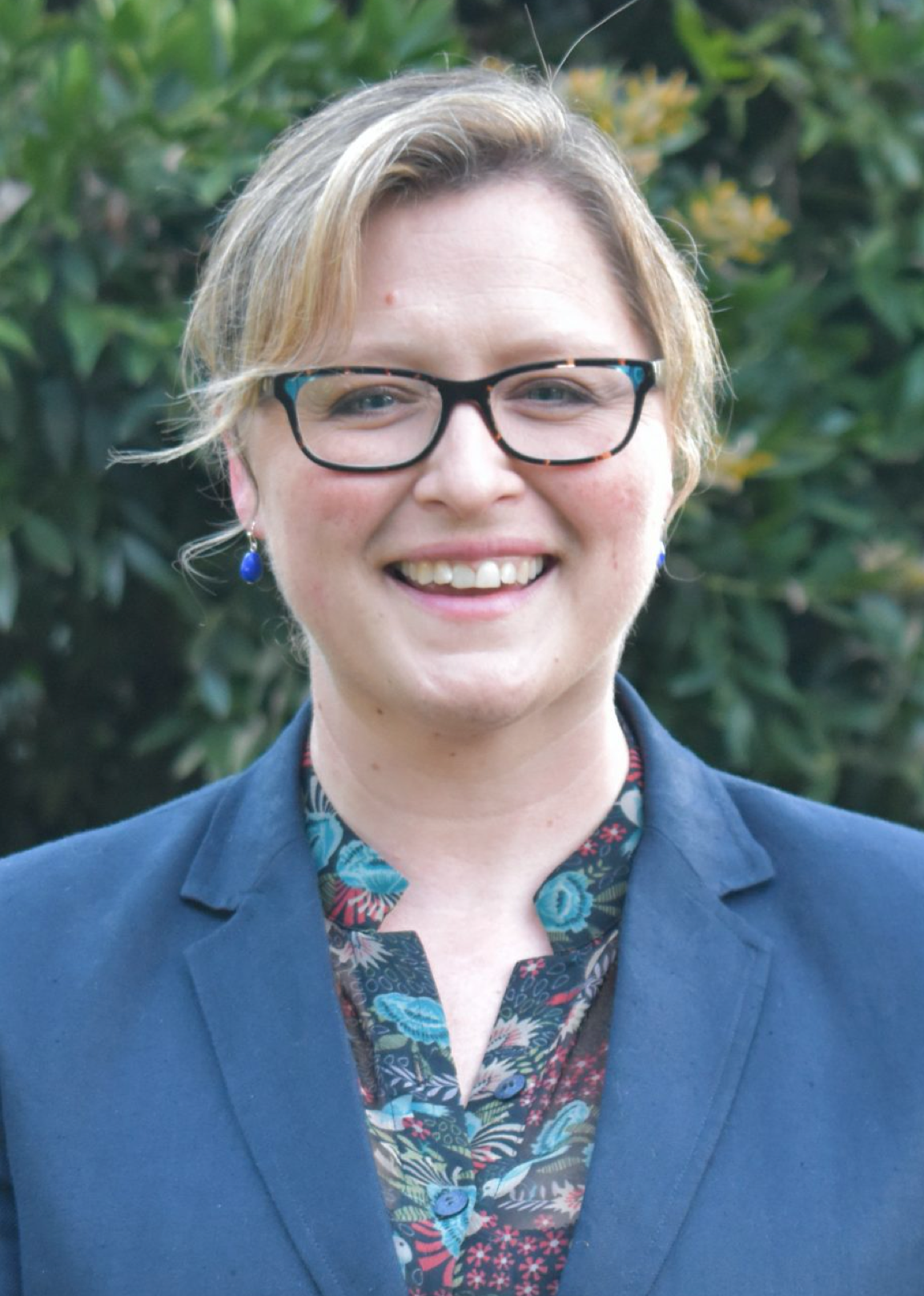

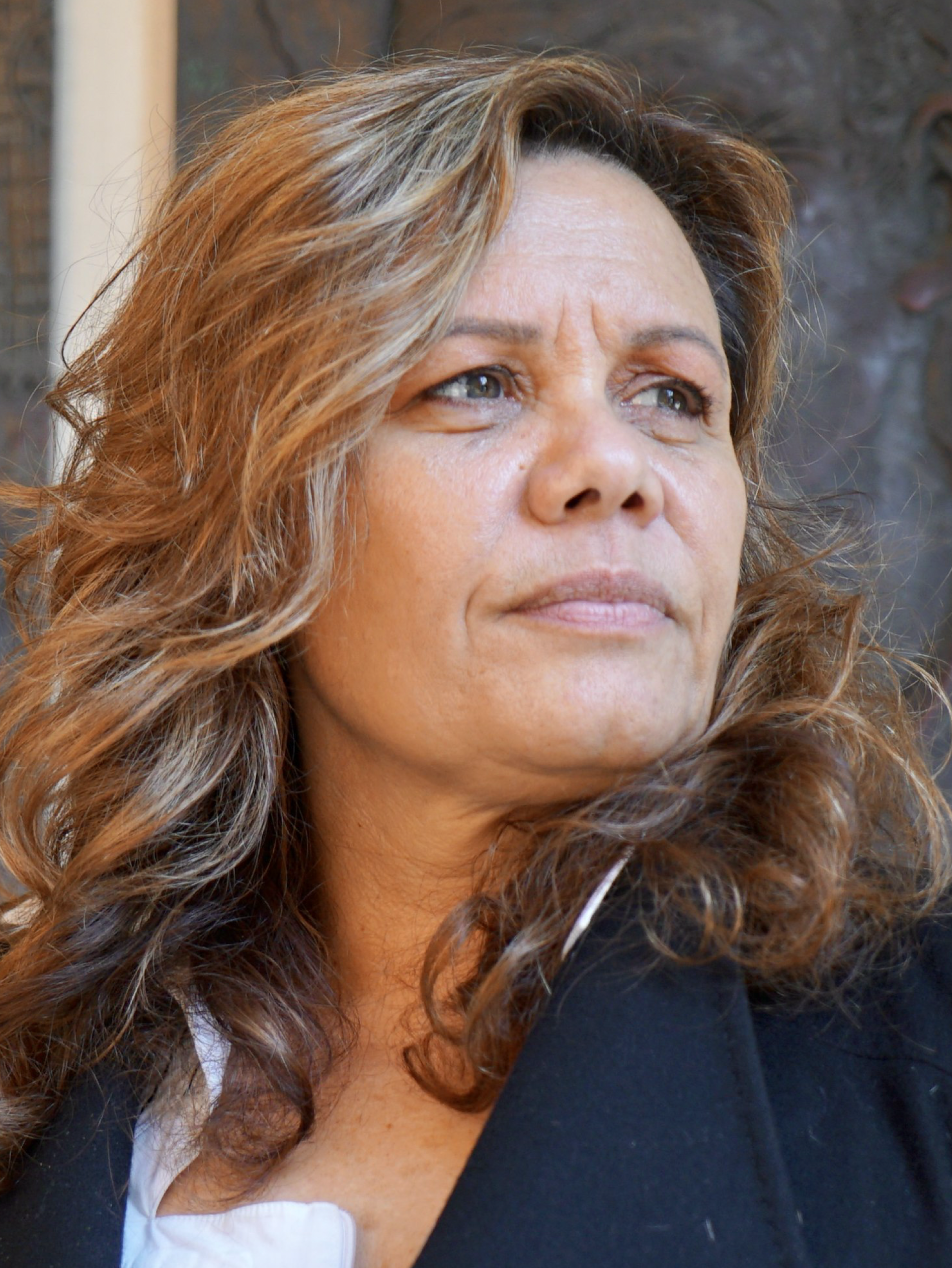

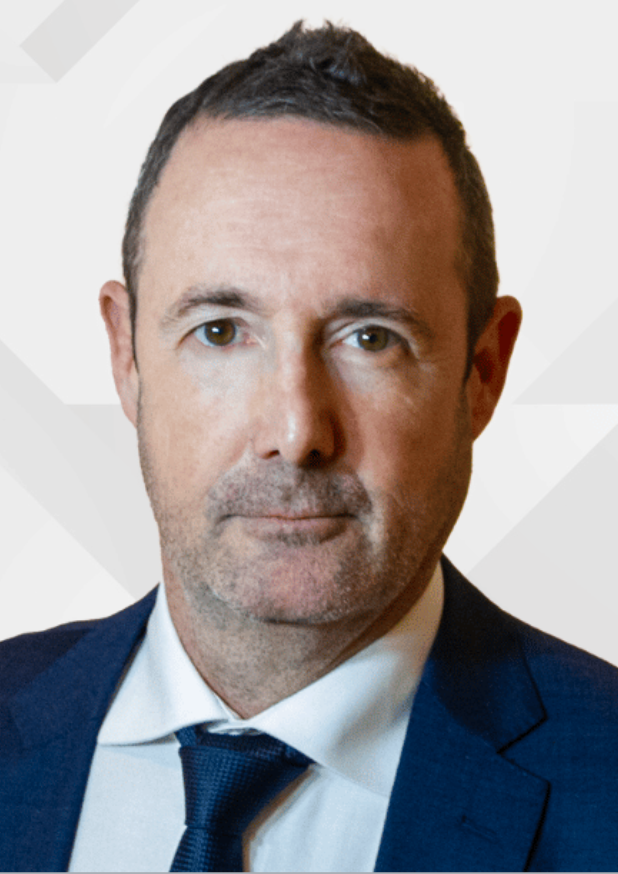
	First party	Second party	Third party
Candidate	Clover Moore	Zann Maxwell	Sylvie Ellsmore
Party	Team Clover	Labor	Greens
Primary vote	33,018	15,392	11,617
Percentage	36.78%	17.15%	12.94%
Swing	▼6.12	▲2.45	▲4.64
TCP	62.90%	37.10%
TCP swing	▼5.00	▲5.00
	Fourth party	Fifth party	Sixth party
Candidate	Lyndon Gannon	Yvonne Weldon	Sean Masters
Party	Liberal	Weldon Inds	Libertarian
Primary vote	10,857	9,038	3,234
Percentage	12.09%	10.07%	3.60%
Swing	▼3.01	▼2.03	▲3.60
Lord Mayor before election
Clover Moore
Team Clover
Subsequent Lord Mayor
Clover Moore
Team Clover
- Councillors
Party	Leader	Vote %	Seats	+/–
Team Clover	Clover Moore	31.9	3	−1
Labor	Zann Maxwell	19.9	2	+1
Greens	Sylvie Ellsmore	16.1	2	+1
Liberal	Lyndon Gannon	14.4	1	−1
Weldon Inds	Yvonne Weldon	9.2	1	0
This lists parties that won seats. See the complete results below.

The 2024 Sydney City Council election was held on 14 September 2024 to elect nine councillors and a lord mayor to the City of Sydney. The election was held as part of the statewide local government elections in New South Wales, Australia.

Incumbent Clover Moore was re-elected to a record sixth term as Lord Mayor of Sydney.

== Electoral system ==
Sydney uses instant-runoff voting to elect its mayor and single transferable voting to elect its city councillors.

Like in all other New South Wales local government areas, Sydney City Council elections use optional preferential voting. Under this system, voters are only required to vote for one candidate or group, although they can choose to preference other candidates.

All elections for councillor positions are elected using proportional representation. Sydney is an undivided council and uses an Australian Senate-style ballot paper with above-the-line and below-the-line voting.

Voting is compulsory for anyone on the New South Wales state electoral roll.

=== Business vote removal ===
In New South Wales, property owners, rate-paying occupiers or lessees can apply to be on the "non-residential roll" in an LGA, as long as they are not already enrolled as a resident in that area and if they are eligible to be enrolled for state and federal elections. Voting is not compulsory for those on non-residential rolls, although it is still compulsory in the LGA where they are on the residential roll.

However, in 2014, then-Liberal premier Mike Baird introduced a law that gave businesses that own, lease, or occupy rateable land in the City of Sydney two votes each. Voting for businesses in Sydney also became compulsory. Many critics saw the decision as an attempt by the Liberals to unseat Clover Moore as lord mayor. The business vote came into effect at the 2016 election and was again in force at the 2021 election.

Following Labor's victory at the 2023 state election, independent MP Alex Greenwich wrote to the new local government minister, Ron Hoenig, requesting that the business vote was removed.

On 13 September 2023, Hoenig formally announced that the business vote would be removed, starting at the 2024 election. Eligible people will still be able to apply to be on the non-residential roll, however only one person would now be entitled to be enrolled on behalf of non-residents − the same as all other LGAs.

== Campaign ==
The Libertarian Party contested Sydney City Council for the first time, choosing Sean Masters as their lord mayoral candidate. The party ran on the slogan "No Moore" and called for "keeping ideology out of council".

Socialist Alliance campaigned on a platform of creating an "anti-racism and anti-war council" with "housing, environmental, and economic justice".

=== Endorsements ===
Group	Endorsement
Turning Point Australia	Libertarian
We Vote For Palestine	Greens
We Vote For Palestine	Socialist Alliance

== Candidates ==
All candidates are listed in ballot paper order.

=== Lord Mayor ===
Party	Candidate	Background
Independent	Susan Ritchie	Co-owner of The Beacham Hotel
Team Clover	Clover Moore	Lord Mayor of Sydney since 2004
Yvonne Weldon Independents	Yvonne Weldon	Sydney councillor since 2021
We Love Sydney Independents	Sam Danieli	Mayor of Warringah from 1996–98
Libertarian	Sean Masters	Creative director in advertising industry
Liberal	Lyndon Gannon	Sydney councillor since 2021
Greens	Sylvie Ellsmore	Sydney councillor since 2021
Socialist Alliance	Rachel Evans	Activist
Independent	Baiyu Chen	Background in graphic design and fashion design
Labor	Zann Maxwell	Former electorate officer for Bill Shorten

=== Councillors ===
Incumbent councillors are highlighted in bold text.

Libertarian	Weldon Independents	Labor	Liberal	Greens
1. Sean Masters; 2. Rahn Wood; 3. Clinton Mead; 4. James Hanks; 5. Rosalind Hecker	1. **Yvonne Weldon**; 2. Rod Morrison; 3. Daniel McDonald; 4. Alison Davey; 5. Murray Gatt	1. Zann Maxwell; 2. Mitch Wilson; 3. Tamira Stevenson; 4. Holly Rebeiro; 5. Michelle Perry; 6. Luc Harvey	1. **Lyndon Gannon**; 2. Patrice Pandeleos; 3. Alex (Ke) Xu; 4. Bearte McDonald; 5. James Dore	1. **Sylvie Ellsmore**; 2. Matthew Thompson; 3. Jay Gillieatt; 4. Caroline Alcorso; 5. Chetan Sahai
Team Clover	Socialist Alliance	We Love Sydney	Ungrouped	
1. **Clover Moore**; 2. **Robert Kok**; 3. Jess Miller; 4. **Adam Worling**; 5. **William Chan**; 6. **Emelda Davis**; 7. Lachlan Barker-Kennedy; 8. Jenny Burn; 9. Christine Byrne; 10. Claudia Bowman	1. Rachel Evans; 2. Andrew Chuter; 3. Adam Haddad; 4. Coral Wynter; 5. Suelin McCauley; 6. Jim McIlroy	1. Sam Danieli; 2. Geoffrey Alder; 3. Mirjana Andric; 4. Scott Davis; 5. Catherine Yang	Susan Ritchie (Ind); Baiyu Chen (Ind)	

=== Retiring councillors ===
- Linda Scott (Labor) − announced 7 June 2024
- Shauna Jarrett (Liberal) − lost preselection

== Results ==
=== Lord Mayor ===
2024 New South Wales mayoral elections: Sydney
Party	Candidate	Votes	%	±%
Team Clover	Clover Moore	33,018	36.78	–6.12
Labor	Zann Maxwell	15,392	17.15	+2.45
Greens	Sylvie Ellsmore	11,617	12.94	+4.64
Liberal	Lyndon Gannon	10,857	12.09	−3.01
Weldon Independents	Yvonne Weldon	9,038	10.07	−2.03
Libertarian	Sean Masters	3,234	3.60	+3.60
We Love Sydney	Sam Danieli	3,209	3.57	+3.57
Independent	Susan Ritchie	1,798	2.00	+2.00
Socialist Alliance	Rachel Evans	918	1.02	+1.02
Independent	Baiyu Chen	686	0.76	+0.76
Total formal votes		89,767	97.71	−0.89
Informal votes		2,111	2.29	+0.89
Turnout		91,878		
Two-candidate-preferred result
Team Clover	Clover Moore	41,522	62.90	–5.00
Labor	Zann Maxwell	24,489	37.10	+5.00
Team Clover hold		Swing	–5.00	

=== Councillors ===
2024 New South Wales local elections: Sydney
Party	Candidate	Votes	%	±%
Team Clover	1. Clover Moore; 2. Robert Kok (elected 1); 3. Jess Miller (elected 5); 4. Adam Worling (elected 6); 5. William Chan; 6. Emelda Davis; 7. Lachlan Barker-Kennedy; 8. Jenny Burn; 9. Christine Byrne; 10. Claudia Bowman	28,201	31.9	−8.9
Labor	1. Zann Maxwell (elected 2); 2. Mitch Wilson (elected 7); 3. Tamira Stevenson; 4. Holly Rebeiro; 5. Michelle Perry; 6. Luc Harvey	17,605	19.9	+5.2
Greens	1. Sylvie Ellsmore (elected 3); 2. Matthew Thompson (elected 9); 3. Jay Gillieatt; 4. Caroline Alcorso; 5. Chetan Sahai	14,223	16.1	+5.0
Liberal	1. Lyndon Gannon (elected 4); 2. Patrice Pandeleos; 3. Alex (Ke) Xu; 4. Bearte McDonald; 5. James Dore	12,704	14.4	−3.0
Weldon Independents	1. Yvonne Weldon (elected 8); 2. Rod Morrison; 3. Daniel McDonald; 4. Alison Davey; 5. Murray Gatt	8,144	9.2	+0.2
Libertarian	1. Sean Masters; 2. Rahn Wood; 3. Clinton Mead; 4. James Hanks; 5. Rosalind Hecker	3,616	4.1	+4.1
We Love Sydney Independents	1. Sam Danieli; 2. Geoffrey Alder; 3. Mirjana Andric; 4. Scott Davis; 5. Catherine Yang	2,478	2.8	+2.8
Socialist Alliance	1. Rachel Evans; 2. Andrew Chuter; 3. Adam Haddad; 4. Coral Wynter; 5. Suelin McCauley; 6. Jim McIlr	984	1.1	+1.1
Independent	Susan Ritchie	343	0.4	+0.4
Independent	Baiyu Chen	56	0.1	+0.1
Total formal votes		88,354	96.0	
Informal votes		3,690	4.0	
Turnout		92,044	72.87	
