= George Moseley =

George Moseley may refer to:

- George Van Horn Moseley (1874–1960), United States Army general
- George Van Horn Moseley Jr. (1905–1976), his son, United States Army officer
- George Moseley (civil servant), Scottish civil servant
- George Clark Moseley, American football player
- George G. Moseley, state legislator in Mississippi
