= William McCristal =

Australian soldier and left-wing political activist

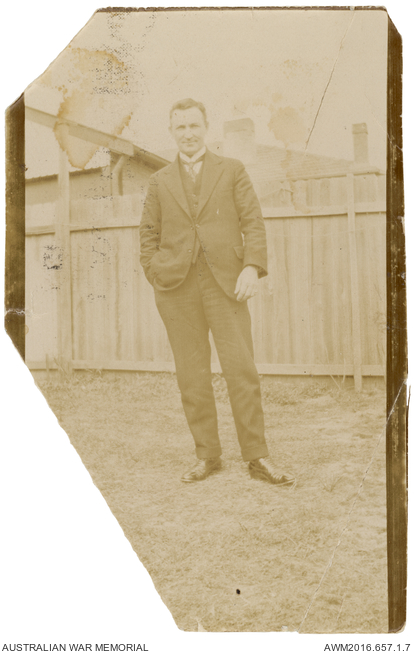
- Occupations: Soldier, activist
- Known for: Unsuccessful election contests
- Political party: Independent (1911–1919, 1922–1925, 1934–1943, 1945–1949, after 1951)
- Other political affiliations: Labor (1907–1910, 1925–1934, 1937); Social Democrat (1910); Industrial Socialist Labor (1919–1922); Independent Labor (1921); Lang Labor (1934); Soldiers Labor (1943); Australia's Labor Movement (1944); Australian Republican (1949–1951)
- Military career
- Allegiance: British Empire; Australia
- Rank: Trooper; Private
- Units: 2nd New South Wales Mounted Rifles; 1st Australian Light Horse Regiment
- Conflicts: Second Boer War; World War I; Gallipoli Campaign

Timothy William McCristal (1881 – 24 June 1963) was an Australian soldier and left-wing activist, and one of the most prolific unsuccessful candidates for political office in Australian history.

He was born in Bellingen into a large Catholic family. He fought in the Boer War as part of the 2nd New South Wales Mounted Rifles, arriving in South Africa in April 1901. He returned to New South Wales in June 1902, and in 1903 married Kathleen Carney, settling at Raleigh. Here he became involved in the labour movement, running unsuccessfully as the Labor Party candidate for Raleigh in the 1907 state election. In 1910 he moved to Sydney after the death of his wife, and began work as a wharf labourer. He ran as an independent social democrat for the seat of Pyrmont in the 1910 state election.

McCristal became active in the local Wharf Labourers' Union, forming an association with Billy Hughes who remained its secretary while serving in federal parliament. He enlisted in the Australian Imperial Force at the outbreak of World War I, serving in the 1st Light Horse Regiment. He arrived in Egypt in December 1914 and also served at Gallipoli, where he was wounded in August 1915. He was evacuated, and the shrapnel in his legs made further active service impossible. He was returned to Australia to serve as an army recruiter, arriving in Melbourne in April 1916. This occupation was short-lived and he was discharged on health grounds in June.

In 1916, on his return from the war, McCristal had become President of the Sydney Wharf Labourers' Union, and became a campaigner against conscription. He was involved in expelling his former friend Hughes from the union, and the union submitted his name as a potential Labor candidate for Hughes' vacated seat of West Sydney at the 1917 federal election; he lost to Con Wallace, who went on to win the seat. McCristal remained active in the anti-conscription campaign, and in August 1917 he was arrested and charged with sedition following a meeting at the Sydney Domain, in which he called the King and parliamentarians "parasites". Convicted on 16 November 1917, he was sentenced to nine months' imprisonment, which he served at Goulburn Gaol.

On his release McCristal became involved with the Industrial Socialist Labor Party, running as its candidate for the seat of Cook in 1919. He also contested the 1921 West Sydney by-election. In 1922 he became NSW president of the Waterside Workers' Federation, and ran again for the ISLP in the state election of that year. Back in the official Labor fold by 1925, he contested Ryde at the state election, and in 1934 he ran as the Lang Labor candidate for the federal seat of Cowper against Earle Page. During this period he was in court three times: once in 1922, when he was fined £10 for encouraging a strike; again in 1932, when he was acquitted of causing bodily harm after a conflict with a sub-tenant; and finally in 1933, when he unsuccessfully sued the Sun for libel regarding its account of the 1932 case.

In 1937 he was again endorsed as the Labor candidate for Cowper, but the executive refused to endorse him and he left the Labor Party for good. He contested the 1943 federal election for the "Soldiers, Citizens and War Workers Labor Party" (sometimes spelt 'Labour'), running in the seat of West Sydney. He ran for Oxley in the 1944 state election for Australia's Labor Movement, and in 1947 contested Marrickville. He now became associated with the Australian Republican Party, a group supporting a United States-style republic for Australia. He contested the 1949, 1951, 1954, 1955 and 1958 federal elections and the 1950, 1953, 1956 and 1962 state elections, as well as a 1954 by-election for the state seat of Leichhardt. By now he was generally polling very small totals.

McCristal attracted some attention in 1952 when he attended the funeral of his old foe Hughes, who he said had "contributed much to Labor's cause and been a great Australian". He contested his last election in 1962 at the age of 81, and died at Repatriation General Hospital at Concord. He had contested twenty-one elections unsuccessfully over a period of fifty-five years.

== See also ==
- Perennial candidate
