= Henry Morton =

Henry Morton may refer to:

- H. V. Morton (Henry Vollam Morton, 1892–1979), British journalist and travel writer
- Henry Morton (politician) (1867–1932), Australian politician
- Henry Morton (scientist) (1836–1902), American scientist
- Henry Thorne Morton (1888–1966), New Zealand politician
- Henry Edgar Morton (1872–1952), Australian civil engineer, town planner and public servant
- Henry Morton, a character in Walter Scott's novel Old Mortality
