= Henry Edgar Morton =

Australian civil engineer

Henry Edgar Morton MInstCE, MIE(Aust)
- Morton, pictured in The Melbourne Punch, 1898.

Commissioner of the City of Sydney
- In office 3 January 1928 – 30 June 1930 Serving with Fleming, Garlick, Bennett
- Preceded by: John Harold Mostyn (Lord Mayor)
- Succeeded by: Ernest Marks (Lord Mayor)

Councillor of the City of Melbourne for Batman Ward
- In office 24 August 1939 – 28 August 1952 Serving with Carlyon, Coles
- Preceded by: Raynes Dickson
- Succeeded by: Maurice Arnold Nathan

Personal details
- Born: 1872 Melbourne, Colony of Victoria
- Died: 12 October 1952 (aged 79–80) Malvern, Victoria, Australia
- Resting place: Springvale Crematorium
- Other political affiliations: Independent
- Spouse(s): Edith Caroline Bond (b.1875–m.1898–d.1940)

Henry Edgar Morton (1872 – 12 October 1952), was an Australian civil engineer, town planner, architect, surveyor and public servant. He was an appointed Commissioner of the City of Sydney (1928–1930) and a Councillor of the City of Melbourne (1939–1952).

== Early life and background ==
Henry Edgar Morton was born in 1872 in Melbourne, Colony of Victoria, to Leonora Callanan and William Charles Morton.

== City surveyor and engineer ==
On 10 June 1907, the Melbourne City Council appointed Morton, then serving as the assistant building surveyor, to the new position of City Architect, with the role of supervising all Melbourne Corporation construction projects.

In October 1915, when the City Surveyor, A. C. Mountain, retired, the Melbourne City Council approved the abolition of the positions of City Architect and City Surveyor, and their amalgamation into the single position of City Engineer and Building Surveyor, with Morton as the appointee. A major achievement as Morton's long tenure as City Engineer was his campaign to spend £5,000,000 to surface streets with wood-blocks to help end dust nuisance. Morton supervised all significant building projects of the Melbourne City Council including the administration buildings of the Melbourne Town Hall (1909) and the Grand Stand of the Arden Street Oval (1928).

On 27 March 1923, Morton was appointed to serve as a Member of the Board of the Metropolitan Town Planning Commission, and in this role advised the Victorian state government on the future planning and development of metropolitan Melbourne. The Commission produced the foundational town planning document, the Plan of General Development, in 1929.

== Political career ==
In December 1927, Morton was appointed to serve as a Commissioner of the City of Sydney, when the conservative NSW state government of Thomas Bavin passed the Sydney Corporation (Commissioners) Act, which dismissed the elected Labor-controlled city council and replaced the council with a board of three commissioners to administer to City of Sydney until new elections could be held. Although intending to return to his position of Melbourne City Engineer once his work in Sydney was done, the Melbourne City Council refused leave and Morton resigned his position on 20 December 1927.

In 1939, Morton decided to run for election as an independent councillor of the City of Melbourne's Batman Ward. At the election held on 24 August 1939, Morton topped the ward vote and unseated one of the sitting councillors, Raynes Dickson.

Morton retired as a councillor in August 1952, with his seat being filled by Maurice Arnold Nathan. On his retirement, The Age noted him as "one of the most colorful personalities in Melbourne's civic life during the past half century".

== Personal life ==
Morton married Edith Caroline (Carrie) Bond on 5 April 1898 in a double wedding at the same time as her sister's marriage at 'The Elms', Riversdale Road, Hawthorn. Setting up residence at 51 Hawksburn Road, Hawksburn, the marriage soon produced a son, Edgar George Geoffrey Morton (born 30 May 1899). Later, at 12 Elm Grove Armadale, a daughter was born on 31 December 1906, Elizabeth Lenore (Bettie) Morton. Morton was a Right Worshipful Brother of Ancient Free and Associated Masons.

Morton died on 12 October 1952 at a private hospital in Malvern, survived by his daughter. His wife had died in 1940 and his son had pre-deceased him at the age of 51 on 14 February 1951. His funeral was held at the chapel of the Malvern office of Drayton & Garson, funeral directors, and was buried at Springvale Crematorium.

Government offices
New title	City Architect of the City of Melbourne; 1907 – 1915	Succeeded by Himself as City Engineer
Preceded by Himself (City Architect); A.C. Mountain (City Surveyor)	City Engineer of the City of Melbourne; 1915 – 1927	Succeeded by C. Kemp (acting)
Civic offices
Preceded by John Harold Mostyn as Lord Mayor	Commissioner of the City of Sydney; 1928 – 1930; Served alongside: Fleming, Garlick, Bennett	Succeeded by Ernest Marks as Lord Mayor
Preceded by Raynes Dickson	Councillor of the City of Melbourne for Batman Ward; 1939 – 1952; Served alongside: Carlyon, Coles	Succeeded by Maurice Arnold Nathan
