= John Meeks =

English-born Australian politician

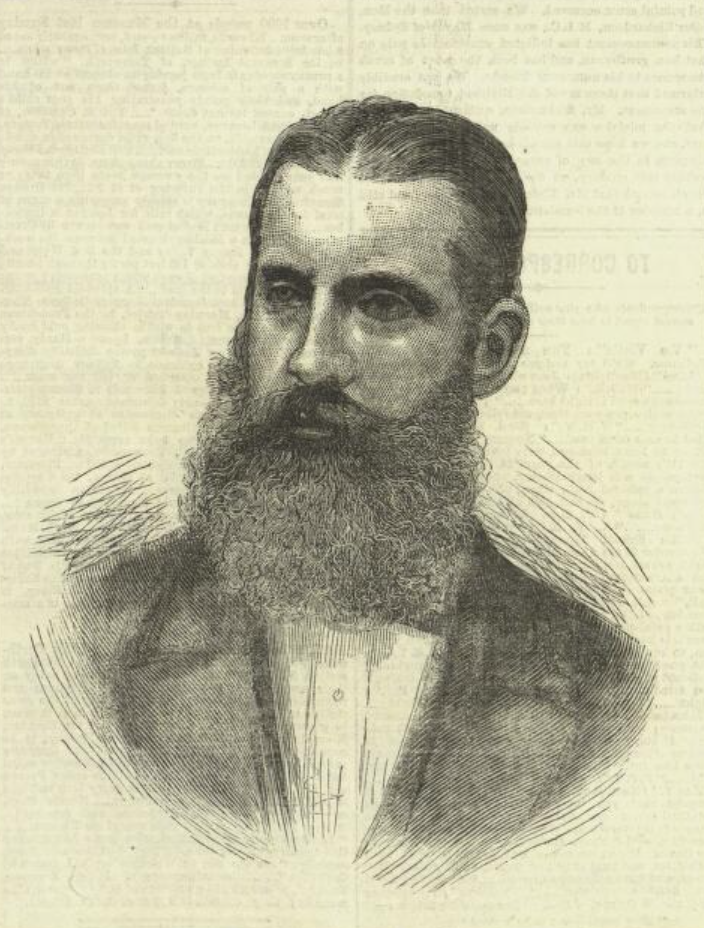
John Meeks in 1881

John Meeks (17 October 1839 – 2 May 1899) was an English-born Australian politician.

He was born at Ashton-under-Lyne in Lancashire to bricklayer William Meeks and Julia Bromley. Around 1861 he married Mary Pickup, with whom he had seven children. He migrated to Brisbane in 1862 and soon moved to Sydney, where he worked for the Australian Gaslight Company. He established his own smelting works, which he ran until 1880, and also served on Sydney City Council from 1879 to 1892. In 1885 he was elected to the New South Wales Legislative Assembly for Glebe, but he was defeated in 1887. Meeks died at Forest Lodge in 1899.

New South Wales Legislative Assembly
Preceded by Michael Chapman	Member for Glebe; 1885–1887; Served alongside: William Wilkinson	Succeeded by Michael Chapman
