= Con Wallace =

Australian politician

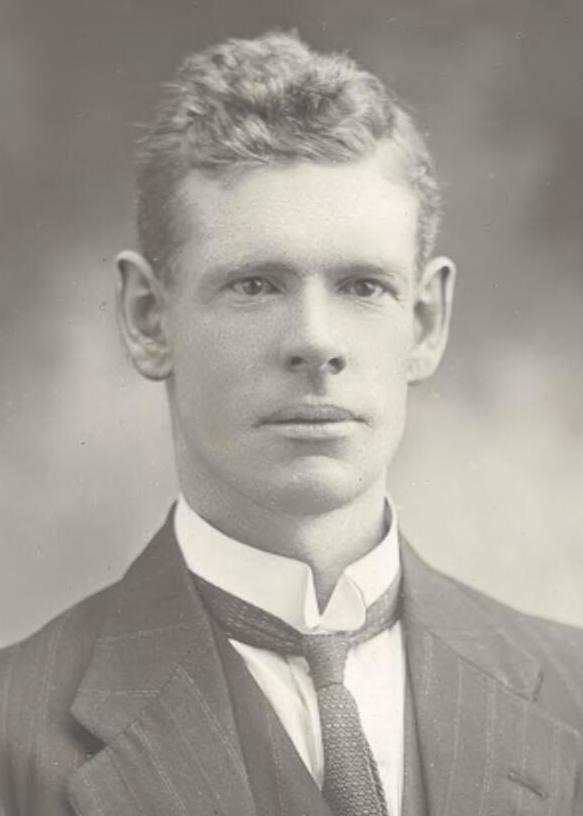

Member of the Australian Parliament for West Sydney
- In office 5 May 1917 – 13 December 1919
- Preceded by: Billy Hughes
- Succeeded by: T. J. Ryan

Personal details
- Born: 19 January 1881 Sydney, New South Wales, Australia
- Died: 20 September 1921 (aged 40) Auburn, New South Wales, Australia
- Party: Australian Labor Party
- Spouse: Bridget Gallagher
- Occupation: Navigator

Cornelius "Con" Wallace (19 January 1881 – 20 September 1921) was an Australian politician. Born in Sydney, he received a primary education before becoming a seaman and an organiser of the Seamen's Union of Australia. In 1917, he was elected to the Australian House of Representatives as the Labor member for West Sydney, succeeding Prime Minister Billy Hughes (elected as a member of the Labor Party but now a Nationalist), who contested Bendigo instead. In 1919, Wallace contested Nepean to make way for former Queensland Premier T. J. Ryan, but was defeated.

After Wallace's defeat in the 1919 election, Ryan's successor Ted Theodore appointed him to a position in the Queensland Navigation Department. He found the salary too small and returned to Sydney. After Ryan's death on 1 August 1921, he stood for Labor preselection in the 1921 West Sydney by-election; he lost to William Lambert. Wallace suffered a heart attack on 19 September and died the following day at St. Joseph's Hospital, Auburn, aged 40. His wife, the former Bridget Gallagher, was left destitute with three young children [Mary Elizabeth (known as Molly), 8yrs old, Cornelius Carr (known as Con), 5yrs old, and John Mithcell, 3yrs old] but was supported by his parliamentary colleagues. Their son Cornelius Carr Wallace was an ALP member of the Sydney City Council from 1967 to 1972.

Parliament of Australia
Preceded by Billy Hughes	Member for West Sydney; 1917–1919	Succeeded by T. J. Ryan
