= Yvonne Weldon =

Australian local government politician

Councillor Yvonne Weldon AM
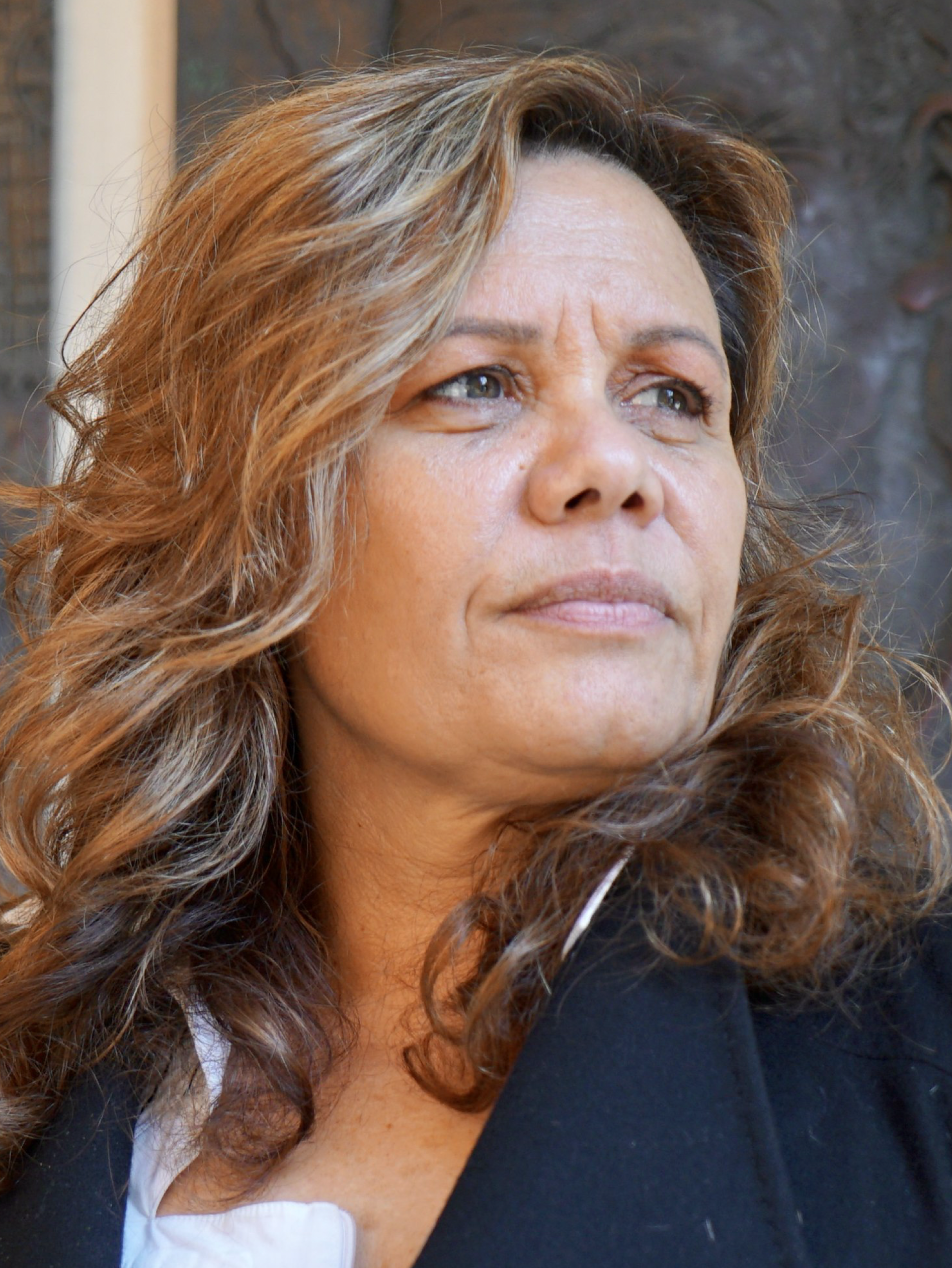

Councillor of the City of Sydney
- Incumbent
- Assumed office 4 December 2021

Personal details
- Born: New South Wales, Australia
- Party: Labor (Since 2026)
- Other political affiliations: Yvonne Weldon Independents (2023-2026); Independent (until 2023)
- Known for: Aboriginal rights, social justice, health justice, domestic violence prevention, and child protection
- Awards: 2019 NSW Volunteer of the Year for the South Sydney Region, 2022 Cancer Institute NSW Aboriginal Woman of the Year Award

Yvonne Weldon AM is an Australian local government politician. She was elected deputy chairwoman of Metropolitan Local Aboriginal Land Council and was the first Aboriginal candidate for Lord Mayor of the City of Sydney in 2021, running again in 2024. She is the first Aboriginal councillor elected in the City of Sydney.

== Early life and background ==
Weldon is a Wiradjuri person. From a young age, she developed a strong passion and commitment to bringing about positive change for Aboriginal people and communities. She attended public school in Redfern, Sydney. Weldon is currently the Deputy Chair of the Metropolitan Local Aboriginal Land Council, Deputy Chair of the New South Wales Australia Day Council, a board member of Domestic Violence NSW and a former board member of Redfern Jarjum College. She has spent more than 20 years working in key First Nations and government organisations across the country.

In 2016, she was short-listed for the Queensland Literary Awards, David Unaipon Award for her unpublished manuscript 67 Days and was awarded the 2017 Allen & Unwin Faber Writing Academy scholarship. Sixty-Seven Days was published by Michael Joseph in 2022. Sydney Morning Herald reviewer Juliette Hughes claimed the book was more than a romance and that it "should be on every book club’s list".

Weldon conducted the welcome to country ceremony for Australia Day 2019 at Sydney harbourside with the then New South Wales Premier Gladys Berejiklian and Governor David Hurley.

== Awards ==
Weldon was awarded the 2019 NSW Volunteer of the Year for the South Sydney Region and she was awarded the 2022 Cancer Institute NSW Aboriginal Woman of the Year Award. She was appointed a Member of the Order of Australia in the 2022 Queen's Birthday Honours for her work with the Indigenous community of New South Wales.
