= Terence Heiser =

Former British senior civil servant

Sir Terence Heiser GCB

Permanent Secretary at the Department of the Environment
- In office 1985–1992
- Minister: Patrick Jenkin; Kenneth Baker; Nicholas Ridley; Chris Patten; Michael Heseltine
- Preceded by: Sir George Moseley
- Succeeded by: Sir Richard Wilson (later, Lord Wilson)

Personal details
- Born: May 24, 1932 (age 93)

Sir Terence ("Terry") Michael Heiser GCB (born 24 May 1932) is a former British senior civil servant.

Heiser served as Permanent Secretary at the Department of the Environment from 1985 to 1992.

Heiser was appointed Companion of the Order of the Bath (CB) in the 1984 New Year Honours. He was promoted to Knight Commander (KCB) in the 1987 Birthday Honours, and to Knight Grand Cross (GCB) in the 1992 New Year Honours.

Government offices
Preceded by Sir George Moseley	Permanent Secretary at the Department of the Environment; 1985–1992	Succeeded by Sir Richard Wilson (later, The Lord Wilson)
