= Walter Renny =

English-born politician and painter in colonial Australia

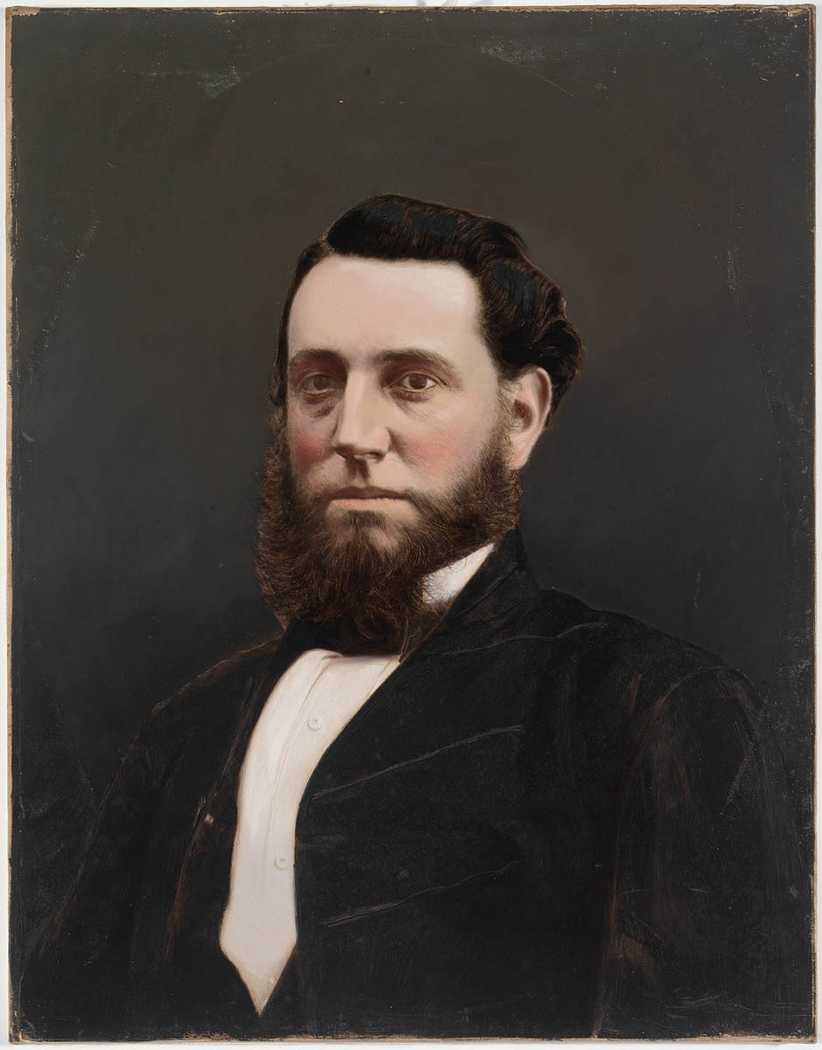
- Walter Renny, c. 1870

23rd Lord Mayor of Sydney
- In office 1869–1870
- Preceded by: Charles Moore
- Succeeded by: Michael Chapman

Personal details
- Died: 24 June 1878 Forest Gate, Essex, England

Walter Renny (died 24 June 1878) was an English settler in colonial Australia who served as mayor of Sydney from 1869 to 1870. He was a painter and decorator by profession.

== Biography ==
Born and raised in England, he was the son and namesake of Walter Renny. Details of his birth date have not been determined. He emigrated to the colony of New South Wales in 1853. He married Mary Ann White in Balmain, Sydney, in 1857. He operated an oil, colour, glass and paper-hanging warehouse.

Renny was an alderman for the City of Sydney from 1863 to 1865, and again from 1866 to 1870, serving as mayor in 1869–70. He moved to Victoria during the mid-1870s. He died at his mother's residence in Forest Gate, Essex, on 24 June 1878 aged 49. Probate in his will was granted in 1879, leaving most of his estate to his widow and mother for their lives, and to several Sydney charities on their deaths. A bubbler commemorated to Renny in 1869 is still present at Argyle Place Park in Millers Point, Sydney.

Civic offices
Preceded by Charles Moore	Lord Mayor of Sydney; 1869–1870	Succeeded by Michael Chapman
