= Doug Sutherland (Australian politician) =

Australian businessman and politician

Doug Sutherland AM

76th Lord Mayor of Sydney
- In office 20 September 1980 – 26 March 1987
- Preceded by: Nelson Meers
- Succeeded by: Jeremy Bingham

Alderman/Councillor of the City of Sydney
- In office 17 September 1977 – 26 March 1987
- Constituency: Fitzroy Ward
- In office January 1989 – September 1995

Personal details
- Born: 23 September 1932 (age 93)
- Party: ALP (to 1987); Independent (1987–1995)

Douglas William Sutherland AM (born 23 September 1932) is an Australian businessman, former Lord Mayor of the City of Sydney and Mayor of Burwood. Sutherland was a founding member of Australians for Constitutional Monarchy and was a delegate at the Australian Constitutional Convention 1998.

Civic offices
Preceded by Nelson Meers	Lord Mayor of Sydney; 1980–1987	Succeeded by Jeremy Bingham
