= Richard Richards (Australian politician) =

Australian mayor (1863–1920)

Sir Richard Richards
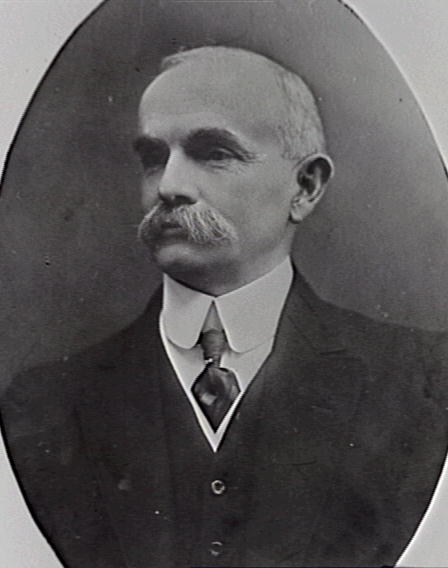

46th Lord Mayor of Sydney
- In office 1 January 1914 – 31 December 1915
- Preceded by: Arthur Cocks
- Succeeded by: Richard Meagher
- In office 11 March 1919 – 12 March 1920
- Preceded by: John English
- Succeeded by: William Patrick Fitzgerald

Alderman of the Sydney City Council
- In office 1 December 1902 – 25 November 1905
- In office 2 December 1912 – 30 November 1915
- Constituency: Cook Ward
- In office 23 May 1917 – 12 March 1920
- Constituency: Lang Ward

Personal details
- Born: Richard Watkins Richards; 19 July 1863 Pembroke, Pembrokeshire, Wales
- Died: 12 March 1920 (aged 56) Elizabeth Bay, New South Wales, Australia
- Spouse(s): Minnie Adeline Booth (m. 1890–1920; his death)

Sir Richard Watkins Richards (19 July 1863 – 12 March 1920), commonly referred to as R. W. Richards, was Lord Mayor of Sydney in 1914–1915 and 1919–1920.

== Early life and career ==
Richards was born in Wales in 1863 and came to New South Wales as a child. He was appointed City Surveyor in 1887 and retained this position until 1901. In 1919 he was appointed as a Director on the board of Sydney Hospital.

He was appointed to Dunedin City Council as Town Clerk and City Engineer in 1905 and was responsible for designing the first underground conveniences in this city, after designing the first one in Sydney on 24 May 1901. His voluminous report into the options around underground facilities brought Dunedin into a new age of modernity around publicly supplied facilities. His plans can be found in the Dunedin City Council Archives. He resigned from Dunedin City Council in 1911 and returned to Sydney where he went into private practice.

== Political career ==
He was knighted in the 1920 New Year Honours but died three months later after a long illness.

Richards was buried on 13 March 1920 at South Head Cemetery, Vaucluse, New South Wales.

== Footnotes ==
Civic offices
Preceded by Arthur Cocks	Lord Mayor of Sydney; 1914–1915	Succeeded by Richard Meagher
Preceded by John English	Lord Mayor of Sydney; 1919–1920	Succeeded by William Patrick Fitzgerald
