= 2021 Sydney City Council election =

- 4 December 2021
- Turnout: 118,511 (68.7%)
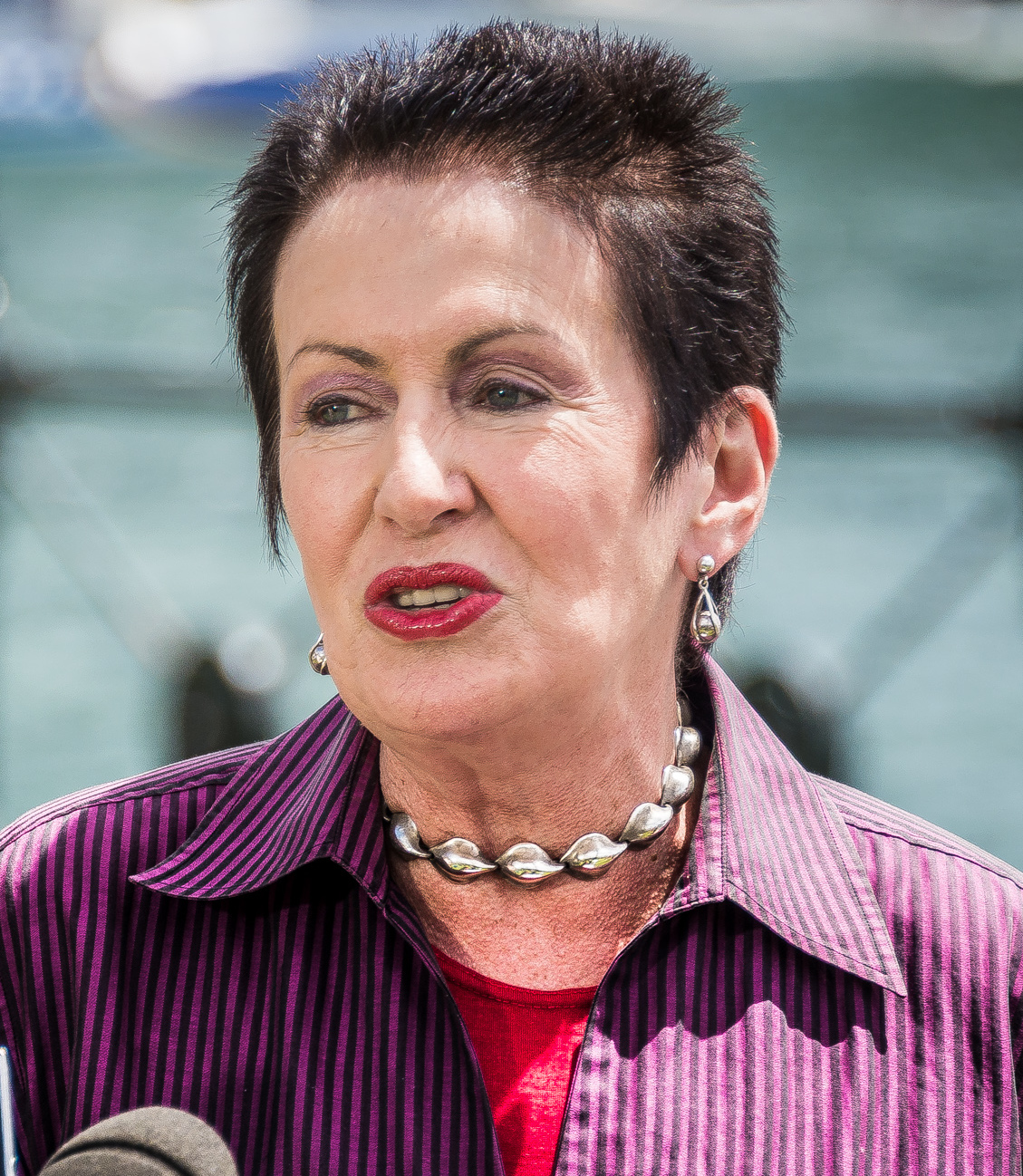

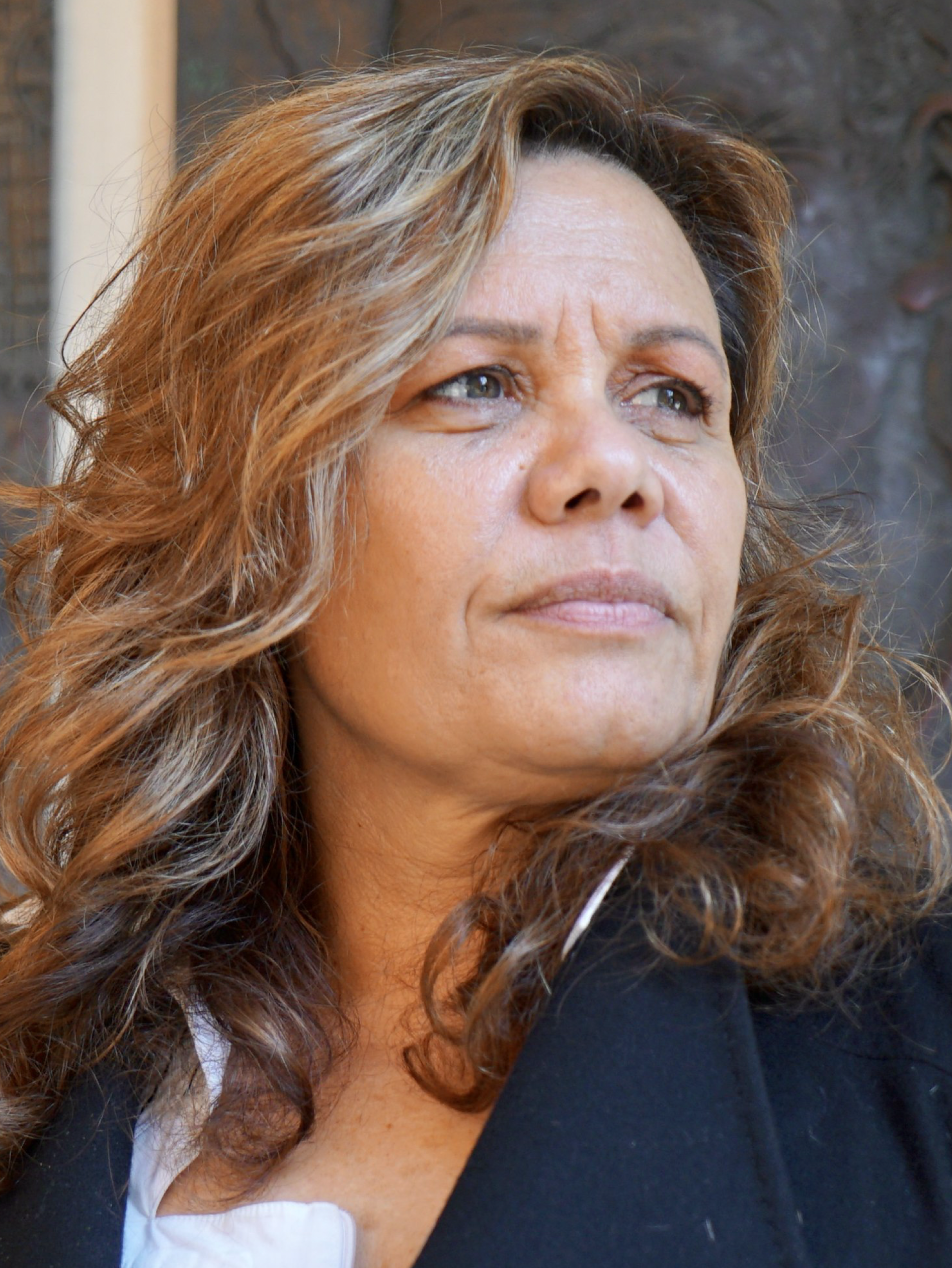

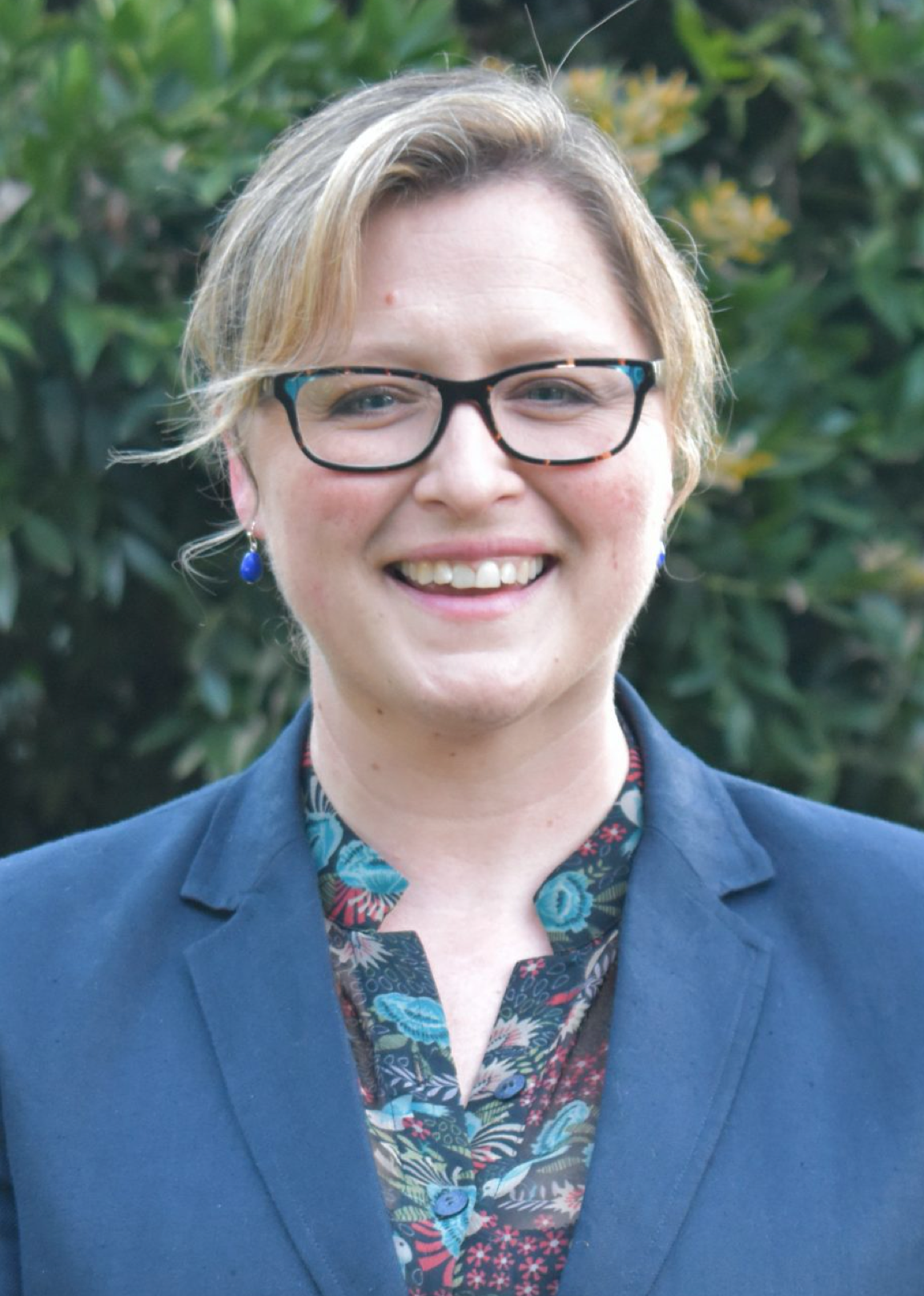

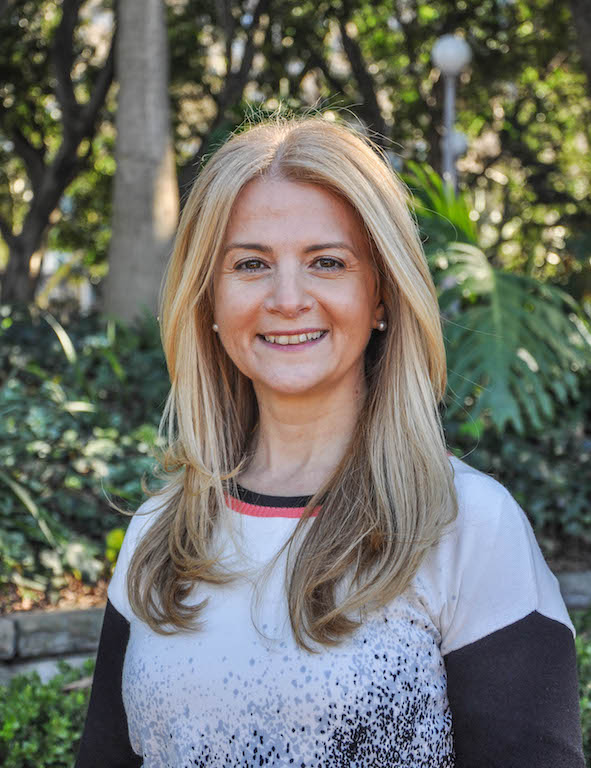
	First party	Second party	Third party
Candidate	Clover Moore	Shauna Jarrett	Linda Scott
Party	Team Clover	Liberal	Labor
Popular vote	50,896	17,891	17,367
Percentage	42.9%	15.1%	14.7%
Swing	▼14.9	▼3.9	▲4.2
2CP	67.9%		32.1%
	Fourth party	Fifth party	Sixth party
Candidate	Yvonne Weldon	Sylvie Ellsmore	Angela Vithoulkas
Party	Unite for Sydney	Greens	Small Business
Popular vote	14,368	9,812	8,177
Percentage	12.1%	8.3%	6.9%
Swing	▲12.1	▲3.2	▼0.8
Lord Mayor before election
Clover Moore
Team Clover
Subsequent Lord Mayor
Clover Moore
Team Clover

An election was held in the City of Sydney local government area on 4 December 2021 to elect nine councillors and a Lord Mayor to the City of Sydney. The election was held as part of the statewide local government elections in New South Wales, Australia.

Clover Moore was re-elected Lord Mayor.

== Candidates ==
Incumbent councillors are highlighted in bold text.

Team Clover	Liberal	Unite for Sydney	Small Business
1. Clover Moore; 2. **Jess Scully**; 3. **Robert Kok**; 4. Emelda Davis; 5. William Chan; 6. Adam Worling; 7. Mike Galvin; 8. Elaine Czulkowski; 9. Philip Thalis; 10. **Jess Miller**	1. Shauna Jarrett; 2. Lyndon Gannon; 3. Sam Danieli; 4. Phyllisse Stanton; 5. Richard Hicklin; 6. Ricky Lee	1. Yvonne Weldon; 2. Karen Freyer; 3. Stephen Conlon; 4. Meead Saberi Kalaee; 5. Kiran De Silva; 6. Mark Hodge	1. **Angela Vithoulkas**; 2. Paul Crossin; 3. Tatiana Coulter; 4. Phillip Joel; 5. Allan Sudale; 6. Lisa Jayne; 7. Nicole Santer
Greens	Labor	Ungrouped	
1. Sylvie Ellsmore; 2. Dejay Toborek; 3. Caroline Alcorso; 4. Chetan Sahai; 5. Mark Smith	1. **Linda Scott**; 2. Damien Minton; 3. Norma Ingram; 4. Tamira Stevensen; 5. Tony Pooley; 6. Meagan Lawson; 7. Ian Roberts; 8. Frier Bentley	John McFadden (Ind); Wen Zhou (Ind)	

=== Retiring councillors ===
- Christine Forster (Liberal) − announced 10 February 2021
- Kerryn Phelps (Independent) − announced 2 May 2021
- Craig Chung (Liberal) − announced 22 June 2021
- Jess Miller (Team Clover) − announced 2021, remained on ticket

== Results ==
=== Lord Mayor ===
2021 New South Wales mayoral elections: Sydney
Party	Candidate	Votes	%	±%
Team Clover	Clover Moore	50,896	42.9	−14.9
Liberal	Shauna Jarrett	17,891	15.1	−3.9
Labor	Linda Scott	17,367	14.7	+4.2
Unite for Sydney	Yvonne Weldon	14,368	12.1	+12.1
Greens	Sylvie Ellsmore	9,812	8.3	+3.2
Small Business	Angela Vithoulkas	8,177	8.9	−0.8
Total formal votes		118,511	98.6	+0.2
Informal votes		1,675	1.4	−0.2
Turnout		120,186	68.7	+8.9
Two-candidate-preferred result
Team Clover	Clover Moore	60,926	67.9	
Labor	Linda Scott	28,786	32.1	
Team Clover hold		Swing		

=== Councillors ===
2021 New South Wales local elections: Sydney
Party	Candidate	Votes	%	±%
Team Clover	1. Clover Moore; 2. Jess Scully (elected 1); 3. Robert Kok (elected 5); 4. Emelda Davis (elected 6); 5. William Chan (elected 7); 6. Adam Worling; 7. Mike Galvin; 8. Elaine Czulkowski; 9. Philip Thalis; 10. Jess Miller	47,877	40.8	−14.13
Liberal	1. Shauna Jarrett (elected 2); 2. Lyndon Gannon (elected 8); 3. Sam Danieli; 4. Phyllisse Stanton; 5. Richard Hicklin; 6. Ricky Lee	20,432	17.4	−2.3
Labor	1. Linda Scott (elected 4); 2. Damien Minton; 3. Norma Ingram; 4. Tamira Stevensen; 5. Tony Pooley; 6. Meagan Lawson; 7. Ian Roberts; 8. Frier Bentley	18,077	14.7	+3.07
Greens	1. Sylvie Ellsmore (elected 3); 2. Dejay Toborek; 3. Caroline Alcorso; 4. Chetan Sahai; 5. Mark Smith	12,972	11.1	+5.12
Unite for Sydney	1. Yvonne Weldon (elected 9); 2. Karen Freyer; 3. Stephen Conlon; 4. Meead Saberi Kalaee; 5. Kiran De Silva; 6. Mark Hodge	10,577	9.0	+9.0
Small Business	1. Angela Vithoulkas; 2. Paul Crossin; 3. Tatiana Coulter; 4. Phillip Joel; 5. Allan Sudale; 5. Lisa Jayne; 7. Nicole Santer	7,219	6.2	−1.15 (Note: Compared with the Sydney Matters result at the 2016 election.)
Independent	Wen Zhou	133	0.1	
Independent	John McFadden	75	0.1	
Total formal votes		118,511	98.6	
Informal votes		1,675	1.4	
Turnout		120,186	68.7	
Party total seats			Seats	±
Team Clover			4	▼1
Liberal			2	Steady
Labor			1	Steady
Greens			1	▲1
Independent			1	▲1
Small Business			0	▼1
