= William Patrick Fitzgerald =

Australian politician (1864–1938)

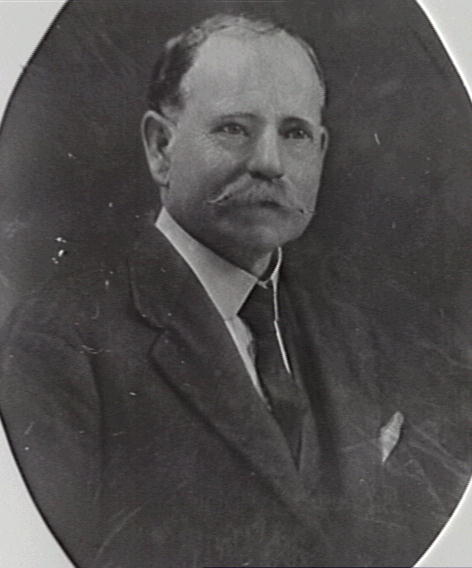
Fitzgerald, 1920s

William Patrick Fitzgerald (26 July 1864 – 26 February 1938) was an Australian politician who served as Lord Mayor of Sydney in 1920. Actively involved in Labor Party politics, Fitzgerald was an alderman for the City of Sydney from 1904 to 1927.

Fitzgerald was born in Sydney, New South Wales, the son of William and Ellen Fitzgerald. Outside of politics, he was a grocer and merchant. He married Matilda Louise Byrne in 1899. The couple had three children. He died on 26 February 1938 at his residence in Randwick, Sydney, aged 73.

Civic offices
Preceded by Sir Richard Richards	Lord Mayor of Sydney; 1920	Succeeded by William Lambert
