= John Garlick =

English civil servant

Sir John Garlick, KCB (17 May 1921 – 17 August 2005) was an English civil servant. Educated at the University of London, Garlick was an engineer with the Post Office before he entered the civil service in 1948; from 1974 to 1977, he was the Second Permanent Secretary of the Cabinet Office with responsibility for the Constitution Unit. He was then Permanent Secretary of the Department for the Environment from 1977 to 1981. After retiring, he was a member of the London Docklands Development Corporation until 1992 and chairman of Alcohol Concern from 1985 to 1996.

He was made a Knight Commander of the Order of the Bath in 1976.

Government offices
Preceded by Sir Ian Bancroft (later, The Lord Bancroft)	Permanent Secretary at the Department of the Environment; 1978–1981	Succeeded by Sir George Moseley
