= Dan Minogue (politician) =

Australian politician

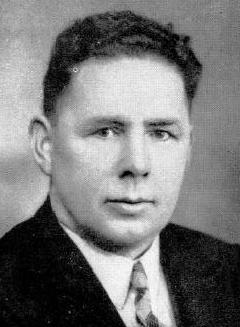

Member of the Australian Parliament for West Sydney
- In office 10 December 1949 – 29 September 1969
- Preceded by: William O'Connor
- Succeeded by: Division abolished

Personal details
- Born: Daniel Patrick Minogue; 18 July 1893 Feakle, County Clare, Ireland
- Died: 7 January 1983 (aged 89) Sydney, New South Wales, Australia
- Party: Labor
- Other political affiliations: Lang Labor
- Spouse: Matilda Wallace (m. 1924)
- Occupation: Shopkeeper, hotelier

Daniel Patrick Minogue (18 July 1893 – 7 January 1983) was an Australian politician. He was born in Ireland and worked as a shopkeeper and hotelier before entering politics. He served on the Sydney City Council from 1938 to 1950, leading the Lang Labor faction on the council. He later represented the Australian Labor Party (ALP) in the House of Representatives from 1949 to 1969, holding the seat of West Sydney. Crescent Street in Glebe was renamed Minogue Crescent in his honour and the Minogue Reserve in Glebe was similarly named after him.

== Early life ==
Minogue was born on 18 July 1893 in Feakle, County Clare, Ireland, the son of Elizabeth (née McMahon) and Patrick Minogue. He was educated at the local national school. He arrived in Australia in 1913. After immigrating to Australia he settled in Sydney and found work as a shunter at Darling Harbour Yard. He later bought a produce store on Crown Street and ran the White Horse Hotel in Surry Hills.

== Local government ==
Minogue was prominent in the Redfern branch of the Australian Labor Party (ALP). was elected as an alderman on the Sydney City Council at a 1938 by-election for Flinders ward, winning 67 percent of the vote on a 20 percent turnout. He was associated with Jack Lang's "Inner Group" within the ALP and was listed as a Lang Labor candidate, defeating a Heffron Labor candidate. In 1940 he announced that he had been elected chairman of the Australian Labor Party (Non-Communist) group on the council.

Minogue helped establish an aged care home in Glebe. He was a supporter of Mathew Talbot Hostel for Homeless Men and the Our Lady of Consolation Home for the Aged, as well as an "honorary citizen" of Boys' Town in Engadine. He was a councillor on electricity provider Sydney County Council from 1949 to 1950.

== Federal politics ==
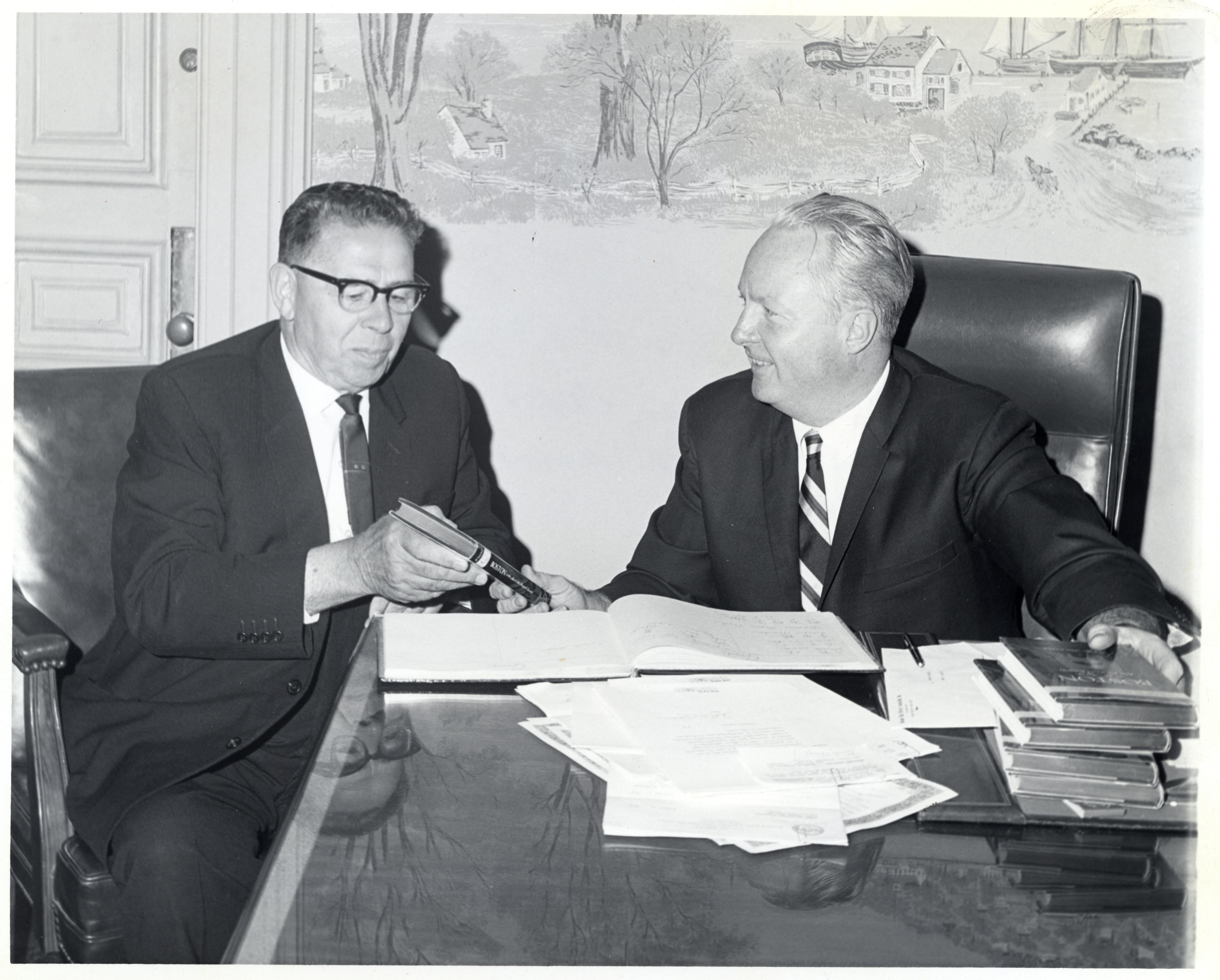
Minogue (left) with Irish-American mayor of Boston John F. Collins

In December 1945, Minogue unsuccessfully contested ALP preselection for the federal seat of West Sydney, losing to William O'Connor. He was also an unsuccessful candidate for preselection in the state seat of Redfern in 1947, finally being preselected for West Sydney on his second attempt in January 1949. He defeated six other candidates. Minogue retained the seat for the ALP at the 1949 federal election and served in the House of Representatives until its abolition prior to the 1969 election, at which time he retired.

== Personal life ==
Minogue married Matilda Wallace in 1924, with whom he had one daughter. In 1947, he purchased the home of William McKell, the former premier of New South Wales and newly appointed governor-general of Australia.

Minogue had a long involvement with the Irish National Association of Australasia. He was influential in the 1944 acquisition of a site for the organisation's permanent headquarters in Sydney. He officially opened the INA Cultural Centre in 1957, and in 1973 also opened the Gaelic Club on the building's first floor. He reportedly "spoke in a well-known Irish brogue".

Minogue died on 7 January 1983 at the age of 89.

Parliament of Australia
Preceded by William O'Connor	Member for West Sydney; 1949–1969	Division abolished
