= George G. Moseley =

American politician

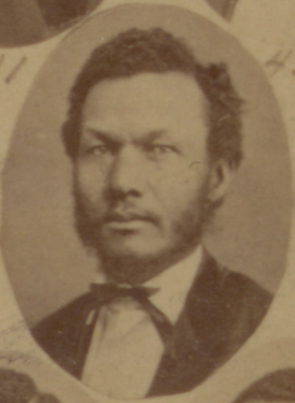

Member of the Mississippi House of Representatives
- In office 1874–1875

Personal details
- Born: c. 1843
- Profession: Politician

George G. Moseley (c. 1843–before 1880) was an American politician who was a state legislator in Mississippi. He served in the Mississippi House of Representatives from Hinds County, Mississippi in 1874 and 1875. He was described as a "mulatto".

== See also ==
- African American officeholders from the end of the Civil War until before 1900
