= Leo Port =

Australian businessman and mayor (1922–1978)

Leo Port MBE
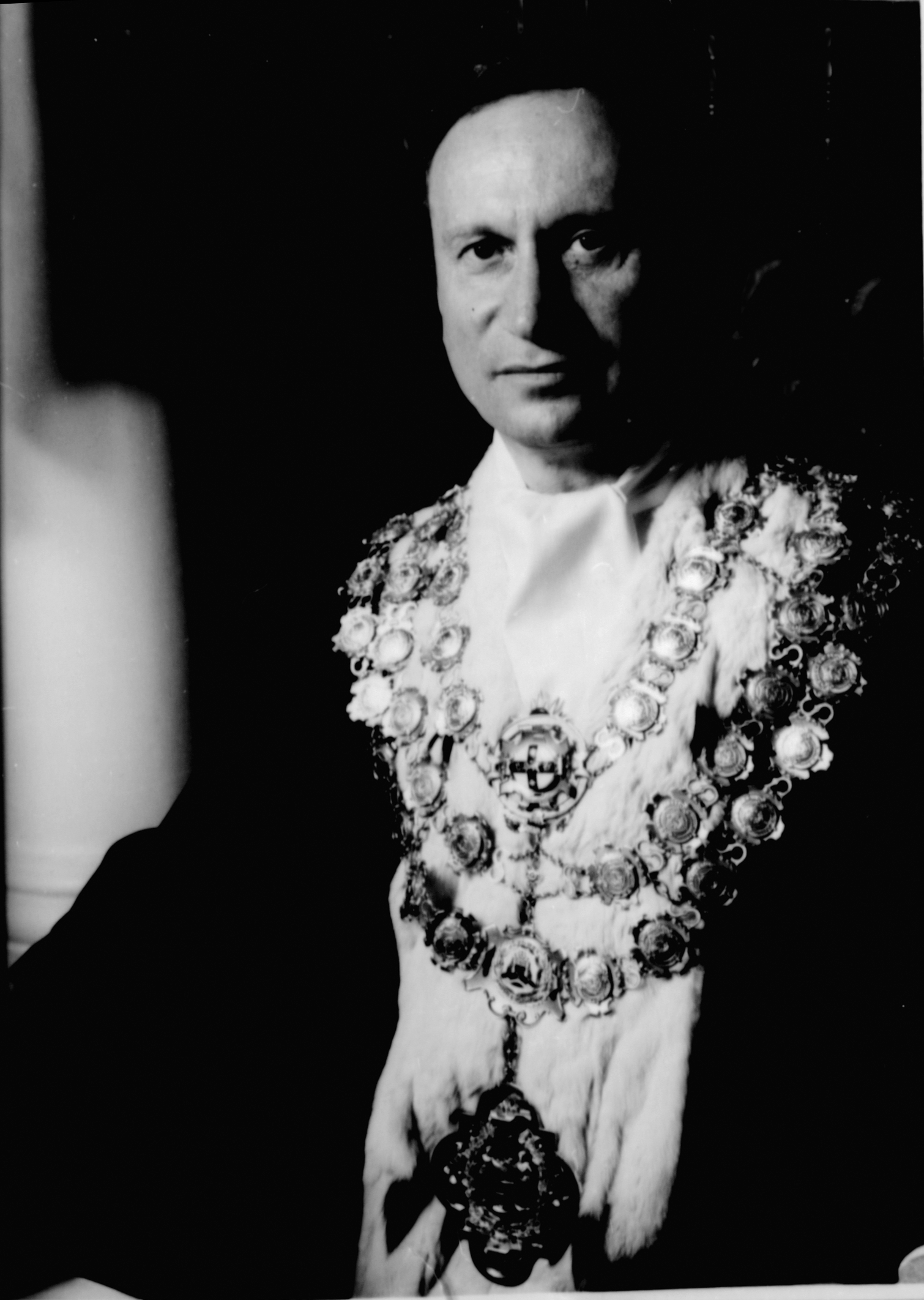

76th Lord Mayor of Sydney
- In office 26 September 1975 – 26 August 1978
- Preceded by: Nicholas Shehadie
- Succeeded by: Nelson Meers

Personal details
- Born: Leo Weiser Rapoport; 7 September 1922 Kraków, Poland
- Died: 26 August 1978 (aged 55) Sydney, Australia

Leo Weiser Port MBE (7 September 1922 – 26 August 1978) was an Australian businessman, engineer, television personality, and Lord Mayor of Sydney from 1975 until his sudden death in 1978.

== Biography ==
Leo Weiser Rapoport was born in Kraków, Poland in 1922 to Jewish parents. His family moved to Berlin in 1928 and fled to Prague in 1939, reaching Sydney later that year. At that time his father and brother changed their surname to "Port", and Leo did likewise.

Schooled at Sydney Boys High School, he became an electrical and mechanical engineer. During his engineering career, he came up with what would become known as destination dispatch, although said system would never come into existence during his lifetime.

=== Mayoral career ===
He was elected to the Sydney City Council in 1969 representing the Civic Reform Association. He served as Lord Mayor between 1975 and 1978. Port was an advocate of civic design, and was partly responsible for the pedestrianisation of Martin Place and Sydney Square.

He was appointed a Member of the Order of the British Empire (MBE) in the New Year's Honours of 1974.

Port was a panelist on the popular ABC television program The Inventors.

=== Death ===
Port died in 1978 of myocardial infarction, survived by his wife, daughter and three sons. At Port's funeral, Rabbi Raymond Apple of the Great Synagogue, Sydney, described Port as a person with "remarkable capacities", possessing a "strong character, resourceful mind, generous heart, broad vision, quick imagination, and tireless industry".

Civic offices
Preceded by Nicholas Shehadie	Lord Mayor of Sydney; 1975–1978	Succeeded by Nelson Meers
