= Jeremy Bingham =

Australian politician (born 1936)

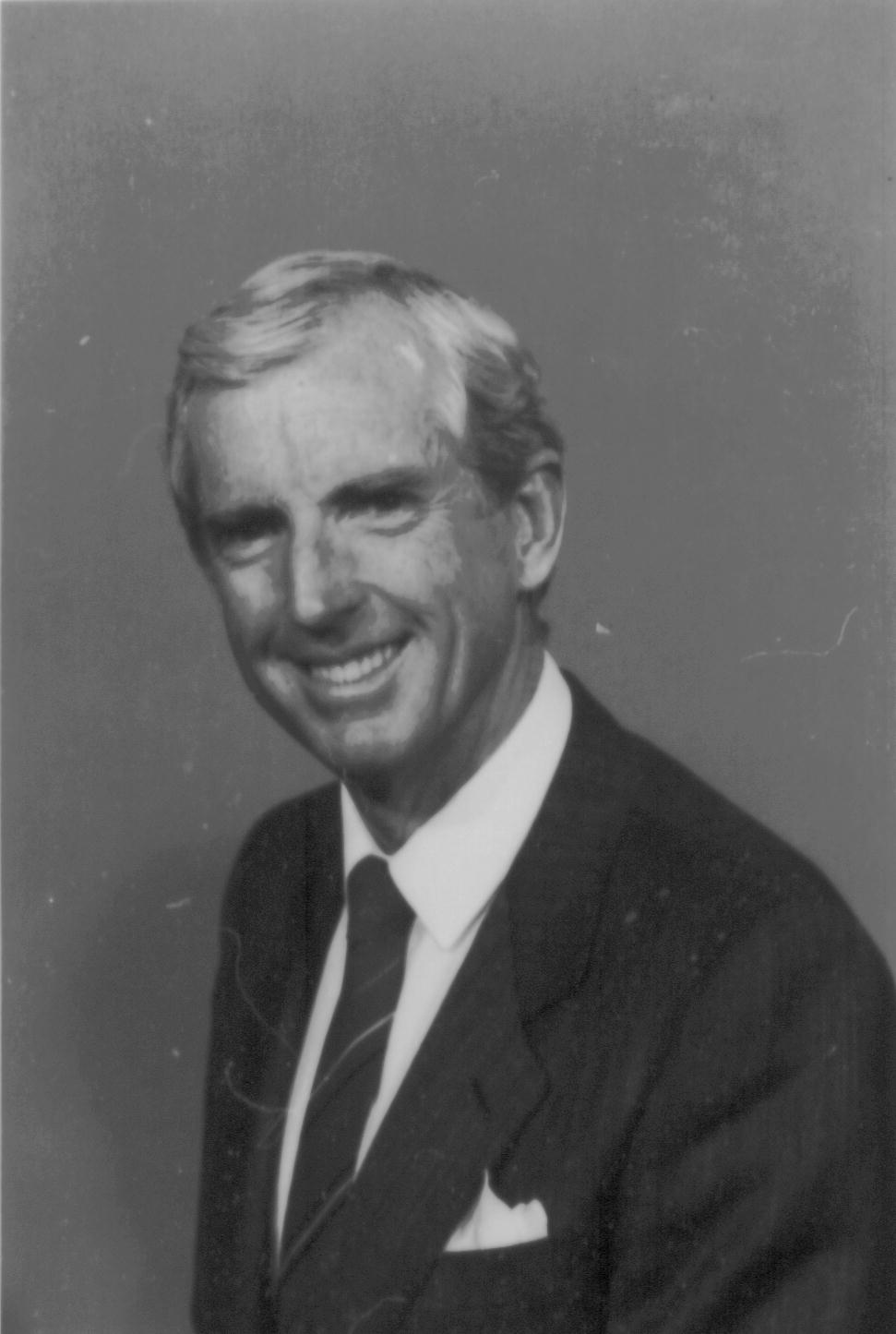

78th Lord Mayor of Sydney
- In office 3 January 1989 – 23 September 1991
- Deputy: Ross Bonthorne
- Preceded by: Sir Eric Neal
- Succeeded by: Frank Sartor

Alderman of the Sydney City Council
- In office 21 September 1974 – 26 March 1987
- In office 31 December 1988 – 23 September 1991

Alderman of the Hunter's Hill Municipal Council
- In office 4 December 1965 – 18 September 1971

Personal details
- Born: 16 March 1936 (age 90) Gosford, New South Wales, Australia
- Party: Citizens' Reform Association
- Spouse(s): Jill Smith (1955-1971); Carol Foreman (1973-1985); Candy Tymson (1987–)
- Occupation: Solicitor and property development consultant

Jeremy Bingham (born 16 March 1936) is an Australian property development consultant, solicitor and New South Wales local government politician who was Lord Mayor of Sydney and an Alderman of the Sydney City Council from 1974 to 1991 and Hunter's Hill Municipal Council from 1965 to 1971.

Bingham was involved in heritage and planning matters relating to the Queen Victoria Building (QVB) in Sydney during the 1980s. As an Alderman of the City of Sydney, he participated in council processes associated with the building’s restoration, including matters considered by committees overseeing the redevelopment and leasing of the QVB. Council minutes from the period record his involvement in matters relating to the Queen Victoria Building Restoration Committee and associated planning activities.

In later commentary on heritage planning, Bingham observed that the Queen Victoria Building had not previously been widely recognised as a heritage item, reflecting changing attitudes toward heritage conservation in Sydney.

Civic offices
Preceded by Nelson Meers	Deputy Lord Mayor of Sydney; 1978 – 1980	Succeeded by Joseph Bradford
Preceded by Sir Eric Neal as Chief Commissioner of Sydney	Lord Mayor of Sydney; 1989 – 1991	Succeeded by Frank Sartor
