= George Moseley (civil servant) =

Scottish civil servant

Sir George Walker Moseley, KCB (7 February 1925 – 28 September 2011) was a Scottish civil servant.

The son of William Moseley, MBE, he was educated at the High School of Glasgow and entered the Royal Air Force in 1943 and served as a pilot in Iraq, leaving the force in 1948. He studied at Wadham College, Oxford, before entering the civil service. For much of his career he was in the Ministry of Housing and Local Government (where he was principal private secretary to the minister from 1963 to 1965) and then its successor the Department of the Environment, where he was Permanent Secretary from 1981 to his retirement in 1985. He was then chairman of the Civic Trust from 1990 to 2000 and chairman of the British Cement Association at the same time.

Moseley was appointed a Companion of the Order of the Bath (CB) in the 1978 Birthday Honours, and promoted to Knight Commander of the Order (KCB) in the 1982 Birthday Honours.

Government offices
Preceded by Sir John Garlick	Permanent Secretary at the Department of the Environment; 1981–1985	Succeeded by Sir Terry Heiser
