= List of mayors, lord mayors and administrators of Sydney =

Lord Mayor of Sydney

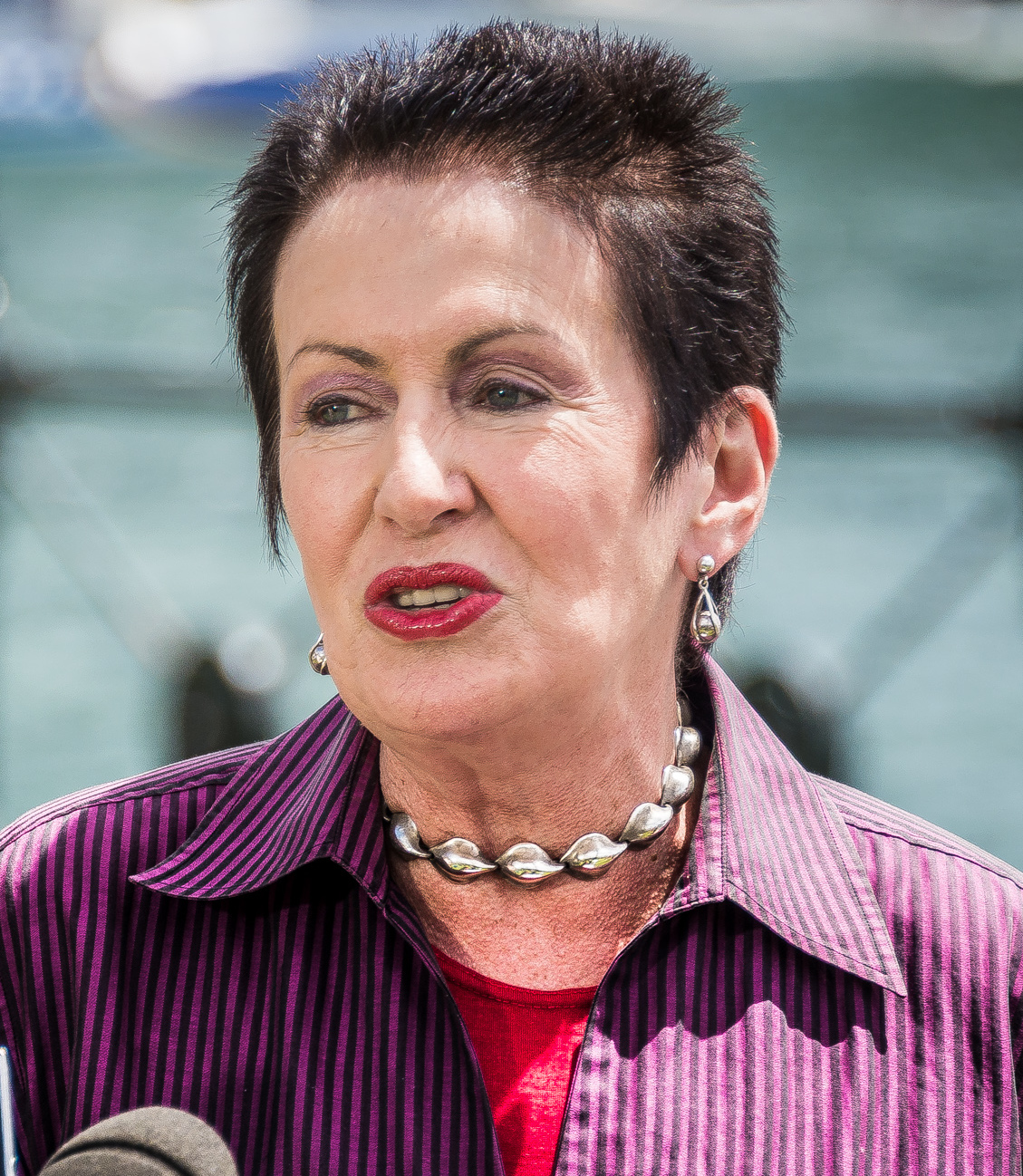
- Incumbent; Clover Moore since 27 March 2004
- Style: The Right Honourable the Lord Mayor of Sydney, Councillor
- Appointer: Council of the City of Sydney
- Term length: 4 years, renewable indefinitely (Since 1995)
- Inaugural holder: Charles Windeyer (Mayor); Sir Thomas Hughes (Lord Mayor)
- Formation: 1842 (as Mayor); 1902 (as Lord Mayor)
- Deputy: Robert Kok
- Website: Lord Mayor of Sydney

The Right Honourable the Lord Mayor of Sydney is the head of the City of Sydney, which is the local government area covering the Sydney central business district and surrounding suburbs in New South Wales, Australia. The Lord Mayor has been directly elected since 1995, replacing the previous system of annual indirect election by councillors, and serves a four-year term. The most recent election was held on 14 September 2024, at which the incumbent Lord Mayor, Clover Moore, was re-elected to a sixth term. The Lord Mayor is assisted in their work by the Deputy Lord Mayor, who is elected on an annual basis by the elected councillors.

== Office history ==
The office of the Mayor of Sydney along with the City of Sydney was created on 20 July 1842 pursuant to the Sydney City Incorporation Act 1842 by Governor Sir George Gipps. Prior to the first municipal election, the governor nominated magistrate Charles Windeyer to serve as interim mayor. The first council, consisting of 24 aldermen elected across six wards, was declared elected on 3 November 1842 and first met in the George Street Market Building (now the site of the Queen Victoria Building) on 9 November and elected John Hosking as the first elected mayor of Sydney.

The title of Mayor (in full: The Right Worshipful the Mayor) was elevated to "Lord Mayor" on 23 November 1902 by King Edward VII, and as part of this process received the honorific The Right Honourable, a title which attaches to the title of Lord Mayor and not to the individual holding the office. In December 1915, the Parliament of New South Wales passed the Sydney Corporation (Election of Mayor) Act, 1915 which amended the 1902 act to allow for the governor to appoint the lord mayor should the council be unable to elect a candidate on or before 30 December of any year. This occurred three times, in 1916, 1920 and 1934.

The office of lord mayor, along with the City of Sydney, was governed by the Sydney Corporation Act, 1932 until the passing of the Local Government (Areas) Act 1948, which placed Sydney under the terms of the Local Government Act 1919, which governed all other local governments in the state. This meant that the election of lord mayor (until 1971 in December of each year, and then in September) marked the beginning of the term, instead of the previous system, where the lord mayoral term began on 1 January and expired on 31 December. When the City of Sydney Act 1988 was passed, the City of Sydney was once again governed under a separate law, but the election of lord mayor did not change until the Local Government Legislation Amendment Act 1995, which allowed for popular direct elections from 1995.

=== Vestments of office ===
As head of the council, the lord mayor is entitled to wear the chains and robes of office, as befitting the ancient status of lord mayor of a large city. In 1902 the Sydney Chamber of Commerce commissioned the first link of a mayoral chain. In 1903, the governor of New South Wales, Sir Harry Rawson presented the first lord mayor, Thomas Hughes, with the chain of office. It features the coat of arms of the Sydney Chamber of Commerce and the Stock Exchange and a pendant depicting the coat of arms of Sydney. Successive mayors each added a medallion, on which was embossed their term of office. By 1945, this practice had ended because of the size and weight of the chain. Today, the chain is worn with the robes of office only for rare civic ceremonies, a smaller collar being worn for most civic duties.

The original civic robe for the mayor of Sydney in 1842 was purple, trimmed with ermine and worn with a court dress hat. The current robes worn by the lord mayor and deputy lord mayor are black, trimmed with ermine, and worn with bicorne hat, lace jabot and white gloves. They are worn rarely and only at major civic functions. Recently, it has become the custom not to wear the robes.

== List of mayors, lord mayors and administrators ==
#	Officeholder	Party/Affiliation	Title	Term start	Term end	Time in office	Notes
1	Charles Windeyer	n/a	Mayor	12 August 1842	9 November 1842	89 days	
2	John Hosking	n/a	Mayor	9 November 1842	1843		
3	James Robert Wilshire	n/a	Mayor	25 September 1843	November 1844		
4	George Allen	n/a	Mayor	November 1844	November 1845		
5	Henry Macdermott	n/a	Mayor	1846	1846		
6	Thomas Broughton	n/a	Mayor	1847	1847		
7	Joshua Frey Josephson	n/a	Mayor	1848	1848		
8	Edward Flood	n/a	Mayor	1849	1849		
9	George Hill	n/a	Mayor	1850	1850		
10	William Edward Thurlow	n/a	Mayor	1851	1852		
11	Daniel Egan	n/a	Mayor	1853	1853		
n/a	Gilbert Elliot	n/a	Chief Commissioner	1854	1856		
n/a	Frederick Orme Darval	n/a	Commissioner	1854	1856		
n/a	John Rae	n/a	Commissioner	1854	1856		
12	George Thornton	n/a	Mayor	1857	1857		
13	John Williams	n/a	Mayor	1858	1858		
14	George Smith	n/a	Mayor	1859	1859		
15	James Murphy	n/a	Mayor	1860	1860		
16	John Sutherland	n/a	Mayor	1861	1861		
17	James Oatley	n/a	Mayor	1862	1862		
18	Thomas Spence	n/a	Mayor	1863	1863		
19	William Speer	n/a	Mayor	1864	1864		
20	John Woods	n/a	Mayor	1865	1865		
21	John Sutton	n/a	Mayor	1866	1866		
22	Charles Moore	n/a	Mayor	1867	1869		
23	Walter Renny	n/a	Mayor	1869	1870		
24	Michael Chapman	n/a	Mayor	1871	1872		
25	James Merriman	n/a	Mayor	1873	1873		
26	Stephen Styles Goold	n/a	Mayor	1874	1874		
27	Benjamin Palmer	n/a	Mayor	1875	1876		
–	James Merriman	n/a	Mayor	1877	1878		
28	Charles James Roberts	n/a	Mayor	1879	1879		
29	Robert Fowler	n/a	Mayor	1880	1880		
30	John Harris	n/a	Mayor	1881	1883		
31	John Hardie	n/a	Mayor	1884	1884		
32	Thomas Playfair	n/a	Mayor	1 January 1885	31 December 1885	364 days	
33	John Young	n/a	Mayor	1 January 1886	31 December 1886	364 days	
34	Alban Joseph Riley	Independent	Mayor	1 January 1887	31 December 1887	364 days	
35	John Harris	Independent	Mayor	1 January 1888	31 December 1889	1 year, 364 days	
36	Sydney Burdekin	Independent	Mayor	1 January 1890	10 April 1891	1 year, 99 days	
37	Sir William Patrick Manning	Independent	Mayor	10 April 1891	31 December 1894	3 years, 265 days	
38	Samuel Edward Lees	Independent	Mayor	1 January 1895	31 December 1895	364 days	
39	Isaac Ives	Independent	Mayor	1 January 1896	31 December 1897	1 year, 364 days	
40	Sir Matthew Harris	Independent	Mayor	1 January 1898	31 December 1900	2 years, 364 days	
41	Sir James Graham	Independent	Mayor	1 January 1901	31 December 1901	364 days	
42	Thomas Hughes	Independent	Mayor	1 January 1902	23 November 1902	326 days	
42	Thomas Hughes	Independent	Lord Mayor	23 November 1902	31 December 1903	1 year, 38 days	
–	Samuel Edward Lees	Independent	Lord Mayor	1 January 1904	31 December 1904	365 days	
43	Allen Taylor	Independent	Lord Mayor	1 January 1905	31 December 1906	2 years, 364 days	
–	Thomas Hughes	Independent	Lord Mayor	1 January 1907	31 December 1908	1 year, 365 days	
–	Sir Allen Taylor	Independent	Lord Mayor	1 January 1909	1 May 1912	3 years, 121 days	
44	George Thomas Clarke	Independent	Lord Mayor	1 May 1912	31 December 1912	244 days	
45	Sir Arthur Cocks	Independent	Lord Mayor	1 January 1913	31 December 1913	364 days	
46	Richard Watkins Richards	Independent	Lord Mayor	1 January 1914	31 December 1915	1 year, 364 days	
47	Richard Meagher	Labor	Lord Mayor	15 January 1916	31 December 1917	1 year, 350 days	
48	James Joynton Smith	Independent	Lord Mayor	1 January 1918	31 December 1918	364 days	
49	John English	Labor	Lord Mayor	1 January 1919	8 March 1919	66 days	
–	Sir Richard Watkins Richards	Independent	Lord Mayor	11 March 1919	12 March 1920	1 year, 1 day	
50	William Patrick Fitzgerald	Labor	Lord Mayor	16 March 1920	31 December 1920	290 days	
51	William Lambert	Labor	Lord Mayor	1 January 1921	31 December 1921	364 days	
52	William McElhone	Independent	Lord Mayor	1 January 1922	31 December 1922	364 days	
53	David Gilpin	Civic Reform	Lord Mayor	1 January 1923	31 December 1924	1 year, 365 days	
54	Patrick Vincent Stokes	Labor	Lord Mayor	1 January 1925	31 December 1926	1 year, 364 days	
55	John Harold Mostyn	Labor	Lord Mayor	1 January 1927	3 January 1928	1 year, 2 days	
n/a	Edmund Patrick Fleming	n/a	Chief Commissioner	3 January 1928	3 October 1928	274 days	
n/a	John Garlick	n/a	Commissioner	3 January 1928	30 October 1928	301 days	
n/a	Henry Edgar Morton	n/a	Commissioner	3 January 1928	30 October 1928	301 days	
n/a	John Garlick	n/a	Chief Commissioner	30 October 1928	30 June 1930	1 year, 243 days	
n/a	Henry Edgar Morton	n/a	Commissioner	30 October 1928	30 June 1930	1 year, 243 days	
n/a	Gordon Bennett	n/a	Commissioner	30 October 1928	30 June 1930	1 year, 243 days	
56	Ernest Marks	Civic Reform	Lord Mayor	1 July 1930	31 December 1930	183 days	
57	Joseph Jackson	Civic Reform	Lord Mayor	1 January 1931	31 December 1931	364 days	
58	Sir Samuel Walder	Civic Reform	Lord Mayor	1 January 1932	31 December 1932	365 days	
59	Richard Hagon	Independent	Lord Mayor	1 January 1933	31 December 1933	364 days	
60	Sir Alfred Parker	Civic Reform	Lord Mayor	1 January 1934	18 October 1935	1 year, 290 days	
61	Arthur McElhone	Independent	Lord Mayor	22 October 1935	31 December 1935	70 days	
62	Archibald Howie	Civic Reform	Lord Mayor	1 January 1936	31 December 1937	1 year, 364 days	
63	Sir Norman Nock	Civic Reform	Lord Mayor	1 January 1938	31 December 1939	1 year, 364 days	
64	Stanley Crick	Civic Reform	Lord Mayor	1 January 1940	31 December 1942	2 years, 364 days	
65	Reg Bartley	Civic Reform	Lord Mayor	1 January 1943	31 December 1944	1 year, 365 days	
66	William Harding	Civic Reform	Lord Mayor	1 January 1945	31 December 1945	364 days	
–	Reg Bartley	Civic Reform	Lord Mayor	1 January 1946	31 December 1948	2 years, 348 days	
67	Ernest Charles O'Dea	Labor	Lord Mayor	1 January 1949	9 December 1952	3 years, 361 days	
68	Pat Hills	Labor	Lord Mayor	9 December 1952	30 November 1956	3 years, 357 days	
69	Harry Jensen	Labor	Lord Mayor	1 December 1956	3 December 1965	9 years, 2 days	
70	John Armstrong	Labor	Lord Mayor	4 December 1965	13 November 1967	1 year, 344 days	
n/a	Vernon Treatt	n/a	Chief Commissioner	14 November 1967	26 September 1969	1 year, 316 days	
n/a	John Shaw	n/a	Deputy Chief Commissioner	14 November 1967	26 September 1969	1 year, 316 days	
n/a	William Pettingell	n/a	Commissioner	14 November 1967	26 September 1969	1 year, 316 days	
71	Sir Lawrence Emmet McDermott	Civic Reform	Lord Mayor	7 October 1969	25 September 1972	2 years, 364 days	
72	David Griffin	Civic Reform	Lord Mayor	25 September 1972	24 September 1973	364 days	
73	Sir Nicholas Shehadie	Civic Reform	Lord Mayor	24 September 1973	26 September 1975	2 years, 2 days	
74	Leo Port	Civic Reform	Lord Mayor	26 September 1975	26 August 1978	2 years, 334 days	
75	Nelson Meers	Civic Reform	Lord Mayor	26 August 1978	19 September 1980	2 years, 24 days	
76	Doug Sutherland	Labor	Lord Mayor	20 September 1980	26 March 1987	6 years, 187 days	
n/a	Sir Eric Neal	n/a	Administrator	26 March 1987	6 April 1987	11 days	
n/a	Sir Eric Neal	n/a	Chief Commissioner	7 April 1987	31 December 1988	1 year, 268 days	
n/a	Sir Nicholas Shehadie	n/a	Deputy Chief Commissioner	7 April 1987	31 December 1988	1 year, 268 days	
n/a	Norman Oakes	n/a	Commissioner	7 April 1987	31 December 1988	1 year, 268 days	
77	Jeremy Bingham	Civic Reform	Lord Mayor	3 January 1989	18 September 1991	2 years, 258 days	
78	Frank Sartor	Living Sydney Independents	Lord Mayor	23 September 1991	7 April 2003	11 years, 201 days	
79	Lucy Turnbull	Living Sydney Independents	Lord Mayor	7 April 2003	6 February 2004	305 days	
n/a	Tony Pooley	n/a	Commissioner	6 February 2004	27 March 2004	50 days	
n/a	Garry Payne	n/a	Commissioner	6 February 2004	27 March 2004	50 days	
n/a	Lucy Turnbull	n/a	Commissioner	6 February 2004	27 March 2004	50 days	
80	Clover Moore	Clover Moore Independent Team	Lord Mayor	27 March 2004	Incumbent	22 years, 238 days	

== List of town clerks, general managers, and chief executive officers ==
The first Town Clerk of Sydney was appointed on 3 September 1842 on a provisional basis by the Governor, pending the election of aldermen. When the council was dismissed in December 1853 and replaced by a board of three commissioners, the post of town clerk was left vacant. The Local Government Act, 1993 removed the requirement that the administrative head of a council be a "Town or Shire Clerk" and specified that the head was to be known as the general manager. The Sydney City Council had previously recognised the changing nature of role in appointing their first general manager in December 1992. In May 2005, the title of general manager was changed to chief executive officer (CEO).

#	Officeholder	Title	Term start	Term end	Time in office	Notes
1	Richard O'Connor	Provisional Town Clerk	3 September 1842	16 November 1842	74 days	
2	Charles Henry Chambers	Town Clerk	16 November 1842	27 July 1843	253 days	
3	John Rae	Town Clerk	27 July 1843	December 1853		
4	Charles Henry Woolcott	Town Clerk	1857	1887		
5	Henry J. Daniels	Town Clerk	1887	31 January 1898		
6	John R. Palmer	Town Clerk	19 July 1898	4 October 1899	1 year, 77 days	
7	Robert Anderson	Town Clerk	24 October 1899	25 January 1901	1 year, 93 days	
–	John R. Palmer	Acting Town Clerk	19 February 1901	31 December 1901	315 days	
8	Thomas Huggins Nesbitt	Town Clerk	1 January 1902	30 June 1924	22 years, 181 days	
9	William Glazebrook Layton	Town Clerk	1 July 1924	31 May 1931		
10	Roy Hendy	Town Clerk	1 June 1931	28 February 1956	24 years, 272 days	
11	Edward William Adams	Town Clerk	1 March 1956	July 1962		
12	Jack Hercules Luscombe	Town Clerk	July 1962	30 March 1974		
13	Leon Parmeter Carter	Town Clerk	1 April 1974	August 1992		
14	Graham Joss	Acting Town Clerk	17 August 1992	4 December 1992	109 days	
15	Katie Lahey	General Manager	14 December 1992	25 August 1995	2 years, 254 days	
16	Greg Maddock	General Manager	1 February 1996	January 2001		
17	Murray Douglas	General Manager	February 2001	June 2001		
18	John Kass	Acting General Manager	July 2001	October 2001		
19	Robert Domm	General Manager	November 2001	September 2004		
20	Petar Vladeta	Acting General Manager	October 2004	March 2005		
21	Peter Seamer	General Manager	March 2005	May 2005		
21	Peter Seamer	Chief Executive Officer	May 2005	April 2006	11 months	
22	Monica Barone	Chief Executive Officer	7 August 2006	incumbent	20 years, 105 days	

== Election results ==
In 1995, the Local Government Legislation Amendment Act 1995 amended the City of Sydney Act 1988, to allow for popular direct elections of the Lord Mayor from September 1995.

=== 2024 ===
2024 New South Wales mayoral elections: Sydney
Party	Candidate	Votes	%	±%
Team Clover	Clover Moore	33,018	36.78	–6.12
Labor	Zann Maxwell	15,392	17.15	+2.45
Greens	Sylvie Ellsmore	11,617	12.94	+4.64
Liberal	Lyndon Gannon	10,857	12.09	−3.01
Weldon Independents	Yvonne Weldon	9,038	10.07	−2.03
Libertarian	Sean Masters	3,234	3.60	+3.60
We Love Sydney	Sam Danieli	3,209	3.57	+3.57
Independent	Susan Ritchie	1,798	2.00	+2.00
Socialist Alliance	Rachel Evans	918	1.02	+1.02
Independent	Baiyu Chen	686	0.76	+0.76
Total formal votes		89,767	97.71	−0.89
Informal votes		2,111	2.29	+0.89
Turnout		91,878		
Two-candidate-preferred result
Team Clover	Clover Moore	41,522	62.90	–5.00
Labor	Zann Maxwell	24,489	37.10	+5.00
Team Clover hold		Swing	–5.00	

=== 2021 ===
2021 New South Wales mayoral elections: Sydney
Party	Candidate	Votes	%	±%
Team Clover	Clover Moore	50,896	42.9	−14.9
Liberal	Shauna Jarrett	17,891	15.1	−3.9
Labor	Linda Scott	17,367	14.7	+4.2
Unite for Sydney	Yvonne Weldon	14,368	12.1	+12.1
Greens	Sylvie Ellsmore	9,812	8.3	+3.2
Small Business	Angela Vithoulkas	8,177	8.9	−0.8
Total formal votes		118,511	98.6	+0.2
Informal votes		1,675	1.4	−0.2
Turnout		120,186	68.7	+8.9
Two-candidate-preferred result
Team Clover	Clover Moore	60,926	67.9	
Labor	Linda Scott	28,786	32.1	
Team Clover hold		Swing		

=== 2012 ===
2012 New South Wales mayoral elections: Sydney
Party	Candidate	Votes	%	±%
Team Clover	Clover Moore	34,903	51.1	−5.4
Liberal	Edward Mandla	11,031	16.1	+2.1
Labor	Linda Scott	7,124	10.4	−4.6
Living Sydney Team	Angela Vithoulkas	6,722	9.8	+9.8
Greens	Irene Doutney	4,462	6.5	−6.9
Sex Party	Zahra Stardust	2,241	3.3	+3.3
Independent	Dixie Coulton	1,303	1.9	+1.9
Housing Action Team	Denis Doherty	557	0.8	+0.8
Total formal votes		68,343	97.4	
Informal votes			2.6	
Turnout			69.2	
Team Clover hold		Swing	−5.4	
