= Division of West Sydney =

Former Australian federal electoral division

Coordinates: 33.8723°S 151.1990°E

West Sydney Australian House of Representatives Division
- Created: 1901
- Abolished: 1969
- Namesake: West Sydney

The Division of West Sydney was an Australian electoral division in the state of New South Wales. It was located in the inner western suburbs of Sydney, and at various times included the suburbs of Pyrmont, Darling Harbour, Surry Hills, Balmain, Glebe, and from 1955 to 1969, Lord Howe Island.

The division was proclaimed in 1900, and was one of the original 75 divisions to be contested at the first federal election. It was abolished at the redistribution of 21 November 1968. It was held by the Australian Labor Party for all but seven months of its existence, and for most of that time was a comfortably safe Labor seat. It was the first of four seats to be held by Billy Hughes, the eleventh Prime Minister of Australia and the longest-serving member of the Australian Parliament. He was expelled from the ALP in November 1916; the time between then and the 1917 federal election was the only time the seat was out of Labor hands. It was also held by Thomas Ryan, a former Premier of Queensland.

== Members ==
Image	Member	Party	Term	Notes
	Billy Hughes (1862–1952)	Labor	29 March 1901 – 14 November 1916	Previously held the New South Wales Legislative Assembly seat of Sydney-Lang. Served as minister under Watson and Fisher. Served as Prime Minister from 1915 to 1923. Transferred to the Division of Bendigo
	Billy Hughes (1862–1952)	National Labor	14 November 1916 – 17 February 1917	Previously held the New South Wales Legislative Assembly seat of Sydney-Lang. Served as minister under Watson and Fisher. Served as Prime Minister from 1915 to 1923. Transferred to the Division of Bendigo
	Billy Hughes (1862–1952)	Nationalist	17 February 1917 – 5 May 1917	Previously held the New South Wales Legislative Assembly seat of Sydney-Lang. Served as minister under Watson and Fisher. Served as Prime Minister from 1915 to 1923. Transferred to the Division of Bendigo
	Con Wallace (1881–1921)	Labor	5 May 1917 – 13 December 1919	Did not contest in 1919. Failed to win the Division of Nepean
	Thomas Ryan (1876–1921)	Labor	13 December 1919 – 1 August 1921	Previously held the Legislative Assembly of Queensland seat of Barcoo. Died in office
	William Lambert (1881–1928)	Labor	3 September 1921 – 6 September 1928	Died in office
	Jack Beasley (1895–1949)	Labor	17 November 1928 – 27 March 1931	Served as minister under Curtin, Forde and Chifley. Retired to become the High Commissioner to the United Kingdom
	Jack Beasley (1895–1949)	Labor (NSW)	27 March 1931 – February 1936	Served as minister under Curtin, Forde and Chifley. Retired to become the High Commissioner to the United Kingdom
	Jack Beasley (1895–1949)	Labor	February 1936 – 2 May 1940	Served as minister under Curtin, Forde and Chifley. Retired to become the High Commissioner to the United Kingdom
	Jack Beasley (1895–1949)	Labor (Non-Communist)	2 May 1940 – February 1941	Served as minister under Curtin, Forde and Chifley. Retired to become the High Commissioner to the United Kingdom
	Jack Beasley (1895–1949)	Labor	February 1941 – 14 August 1946	Served as minister under Curtin, Forde and Chifley. Retired to become the High Commissioner to the United Kingdom
	William O'Connor (1910–1987)	Labor	28 September 1946 – 10 December 1949	Transferred to the Division of Martin
	Dan Minogue (1893–1983)	Labor	10 December 1949 – 29 September 1969	Retired after West Sydney was abolished in 1969
