= 1921 West Sydney by-election =

- 3 September 1921
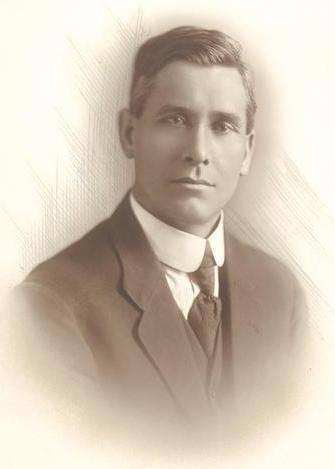
	First party	Second party
		NAT
Candidate	William Lambert	Alfred Henry
Party	Labor	Nationalist
Popular vote	7,857	5,237
Percentage	57.3%	38.2%
Swing	▼14.9pp	▲10.4pp
TPP	59.6%	40.4%
TPP swing	▼12.6pp	▲12.6pp
MP before election
T. J. Ryan
Labor
Elected MP
William Lambert
Labor

A by-election was held for the Australian House of Representatives seat of West Sydney on 3 September 1921. This was triggered by the death of Labor MP T. J. Ryan.

The by-election was won by Labor candidate William Lambert.

== Results ==
West Sydney by-election, 1921
Party	Candidate	Votes	%	±%
Labor	William Lambert	7,857	57.3	−14.9
Nationalist	Alfred Henry	5,237	38.2	+10.4
Independent Labor	William McCristal	430	3.1	+3.1
Taxpayers' Association	John Powell	186	1.4	+1.4
Total formal votes		13,710	95.8	
Informal votes		606	4.2	
Turnout		14,316	45.3	
Two-party-preferred result
Labor	William Lambert		59.6	−12.6
Nationalist	Alfred Henry		40.4	+12.6
Labor hold		Swing	−12.6	
