= Nelson Meers =

Australian mayor (1938–2022)

Nelson John Meers AO
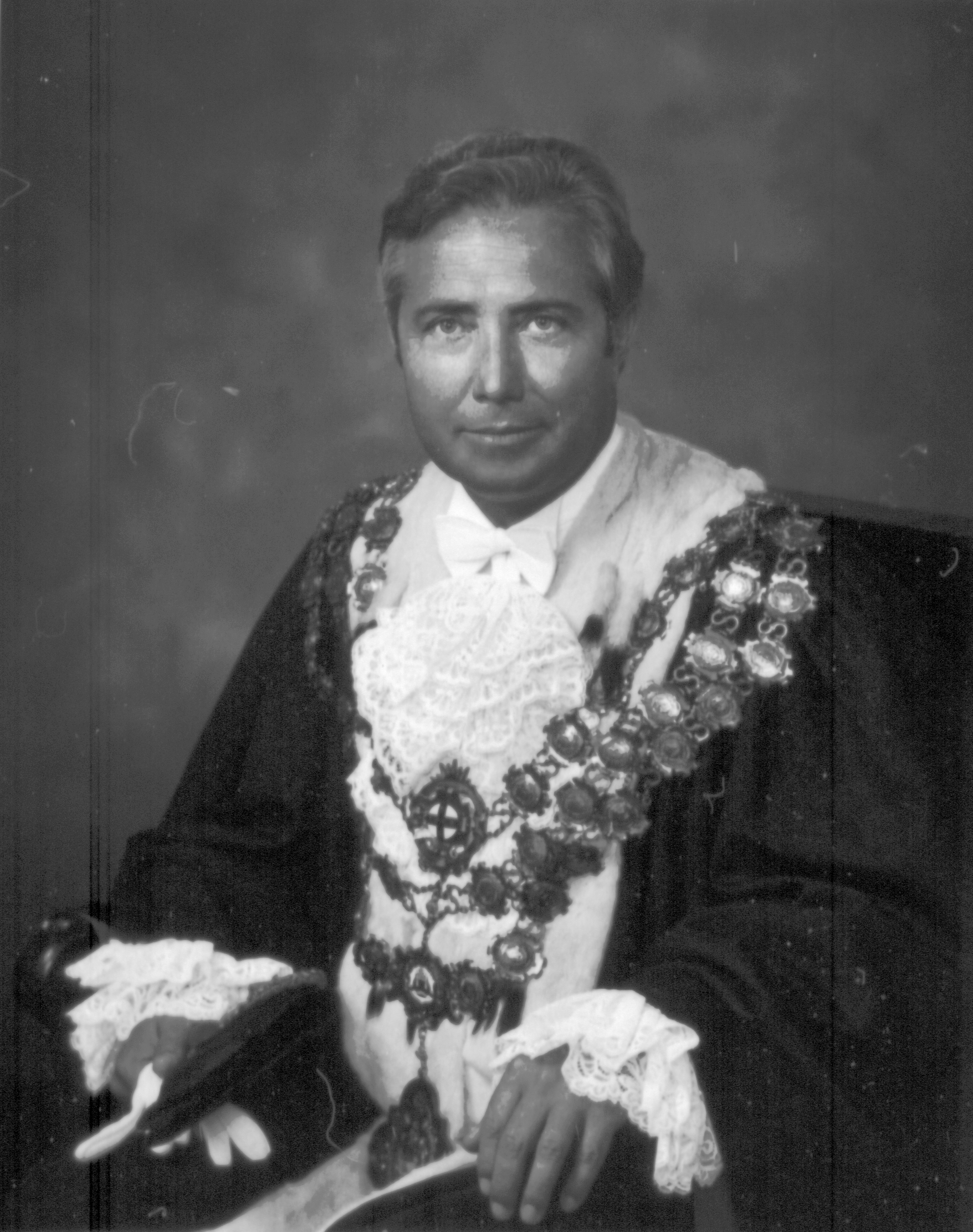
- Meers wearing mayoral robes

77th Lord Mayor of Sydney
- In office 1978–1980
- Preceded by: Leo Port
- Succeeded by: Doug Sutherland

Personal details
- Born: 6 January 1938 Australia
- Died: 23 September 2022 (aged 84)

Nelson John Meers, AO (6 January 1938 – 23 September 2022) was Lord Mayor of Sydney between 1978 and 1980. He held a degree in law from the University of Sydney.

== Biography ==
Meers was born on 6 January 1938. Elected in 1974 as an Alderman of the City of Sydney, Meers served in successive years as Chairman of Properties, Chairman of Works and Deputy Lord Mayor. Prior to his own term as Lord Mayor (which began upon the sudden death of incumbent Leo Port), Meers established an extensive commercial and defamation practice as a partner of two leading international law firms. Meers is also a past President of the Civic Reform Association. He stepped down from the mayoralty in 1980; Doug Sutherland succeeded him.

In 2001 Meers, to formalise his personal tradition of philanthropic giving, founded the Nelson Meers Foundation. The Nelson Meers Foundation was the first ‘Prescribed Private Fund’ to commence operation in Australia. Four years later, the Foundation won the Goldman Sachs JBWere Artsupport Australia Philanthropy Leadership Award. Meers was the subject of a portrait commission by Australian sculptor Jody Pawley. Meers died on 23 September 2022, at the age of 84.

Preceded by Leo Port	Lord Mayor of Sydney; 1978-1980	Succeeded by Doug Sutherland
