= William Lambert (Australian politician) =

Australian politician and unionist

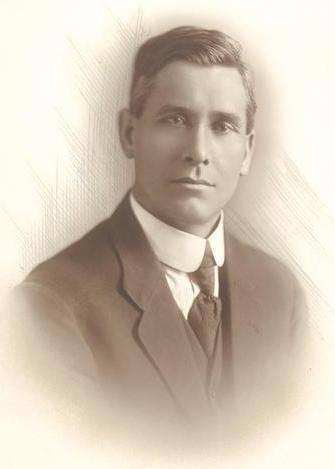

52nd Lord Mayor of Sydney
- In office 1921–1921
- Preceded by: William Patrick Fitzgerald
- Succeeded by: William Percy McElhone

Member of the Australian Parliament for West Sydney
- In office 3 September 1921 – 6 September 1928
- Preceded by: T. J. Ryan
- Succeeded by: Jack Beasley

Personal details
- Born: 24 March 1881 Swallow Creek, Australia
- Died: 6 September 1928 (aged 47) Randwick, New South Wales, Australia
- Party: Australian Labor Party

William Henry Lambert (24 March 1881 – 6 September 1928) was an Australian politician and unionist, serving for one term as Lord Mayor of Sydney in 1921.

== Early life ==
Lambert was born at Swallow Creek, near Orange, on 24 March 1881 to Irish-born stonemason James Lambert and Elizabeth, née O'Brien. He received a primary education and subsequently worked as a shearer. He soon became involved with the Australian Workers' Union. On 9 October 1909 he married waitress Bertha Anne McConnell at Dubbo, Dubbo. In 1915 he became secretary of the AWU's central branch.

== Lord Mayor ==
Lambert was active in the anti-conscription movement during World War I. He was elected to Sydney Municipal Council in December 1918 and was Lord Mayor of Sydney in 1921. He used his casting vote to support Labor policy, and was noted for preferring the Australian flag to the Union Jack.

== Federal politics ==
Lambert was elected to the Australian House of Representatives for the seat of West Sydney in the 1921 by-election following the death of T. J. Ryan, representing the Australian Labor Party. He kept a fairly low profile in Parliament, but became intimately involved in faction politics. His political fortunes declined after Jack Lang became leader of the New South Wales Labor Party. As such, he lost pre-selection for West Sydney in 1928.

Lambert told the Daily Telegraph Pictorial that he had been offered £8000 in 1925 to resign his seat in favour of Ted Theodore. Lambert had denied this when it appeared in the Evening News in 1925, but the Bruce government nevertheless appointed a royal commissioner, who discounted Lambert's testimony but found that William Mahony had been compensated in such a way.

Lambert died on 6 September 1928 of heart disease.

Parliament of Australia
Preceded by T. J. Ryan	Member for West Sydney; 1921–1928	Succeeded by Jack Beasley
Civic offices
Preceded by William Patrick Fitzgerald	Lord Mayor of Sydney; 1921	Succeeded by William Percy McElhone
