= Gold (surname) =

Gold is a surname. Notable people with the surname include:

- Adam Gold (disambiguation), multiple people

- Adam Golde, politician
- Adam Gold (radio presenter) on WPTK
- Adam Gold (musician) of The Mendoza Line (band)

- Alan Gold (disambiguation), multiple people

- Alan Gold (author) (1945–2024), Australian author, literary critic and human rights activist
- Alan B. Gold (1917–2005), chief justice of the Quebec Superior Court
- Alan Stephen Gold (born 1944), American lawyer and judge

- Alison Gold (born 2002), American pop singer
- Andrew Gold (1951–2011), American singer-songwriter
- Andrew Gold (journalist) (born 1989), British journalist, YouTuber, podcaster, filmmaker and author
- Ari Gold (disambiguation), multiple people

- Ari Gold (musician) (1974–2021), R&B artist
- Ari Gold (album), eponymous album, released 2001
- Ari Gold (filmmaker), filmmaker, actor, musician

- Arielle Gold (born 1996), American Olympic bronze medalist and world champion snowboarder
- Bela Gold (1915–2012), Hungarian-born American businessman and professor
- Ben-Zion Gold (1923–2016), Polish-American rabbi
- Bill Gold (1921–2018), American graphic designer
- Bonnie Gold (born 1948), American mathematician
- Brian and Tony Gold, Jamaican dance hall duo
- Charles Gold (disambiguation), multiple people

- Charles Gold (British Army officer) (d. 1842), British artillery officer, fought at Waterloo for 2nd Infantry Division (United Kingdom)
- Charles Emilius Gold (1809–1871), New Zealand soldier and artist, son of the above
- Sir Charles Gold (MP) (1837–1923), Liberal Member of Parliament for Saffron Walden

- Daisy Hendley Gold (1893–1975), American author and journalist
- Dave Gold (1932–2013), founder of 99 Cents Only chain
- David Gold (disambiguation), multiple people

- David Gold (1980–2011), frontman of the band Woods of Ypres
- David Gold, Baron Gold (born 1951), British lawyer and Conservative life peer in the House of Lords
- David Gold (bridge), English bridge player
- David Gold (businessman) (1936–2023), English businessman
- David Gold (footballer) (born 1993), Scottish footballer
- David Gold (talk radio host), American conservative talk radio host

- Dore Gold (born 1953), Israeli diplomat
- Edgar Gold (born 1934), Australian-Canadian lawyer, author, academic, and Master Mariner
- Edward Gold (1936–2022), American composer
- Eli Gold (born 1953), American sportscaster
- Elon Gold (born 1970), American comedian, actor, writer and producer; brother of Ari Gold
- Emanuel R. Gold (1935–2013), New York politician

- Ernest Gold (meteorologist) (1881–1976), British meteorologist
- Ernest Gold (composer) (1921–1999), American composer

- Gary Pig Gold (born 1955), Canadian singer-songwriter, record producer, filmmaker and author
- Gracie Gold (born 1995), American figure skater
- Glen David Gold (born 1954), American author
- Hadas Gold (born 1988), American media and business reporter
- Harry Gold (disambiguation), multiple people
- Harvey Gold (born 1952), American guitarist, bassist, and organist
- Henry Gold (born c. 1934), Australian photographer
- Herbert Gold (1924–2023), American novelist
- H. L. Gold (Horace Leonard Gold, 1914–1996), American science fiction writer and editor
- Ian Gold (born 1978), American football linebacker
- Jack Gold (1930–2015), British film and television director
- Jacqueline Gold (1960–2023), British businesswoman
- Jake Gold (born 1958), Canadian music manager
- Jamie Gold (born 1969), winner of the 2006 World Series of Poker Main Event
- Jared Gold (born 1972), American fashion designer
- Joe Gold (1922–2004), American bodybuilder and entrepreneur
- Joe Dan Gold (1942–2011), American college basketball player and coach
- John Gold (born 1988), American football player
- Jonathan Gold (1960–2018), Pulitzer Prize–winning food critic
- Joseph Gold (disambiguation), multiple people

- Joseph Gold (lawyer) (1912–2000), international law scholar and official of the International Monetary Fund
- Joseph Gold, chemist who proposed the medical use of hydrazine sulfate in 1970s

- Judy Gold (born 1962), American comedian and actress
- Julie Gold, American singer-songwriter
- Kathe Gold (1907–1997), Austrian actress
- Kristi Gold, American romance novelist
- LauraMaery Gold, American psychotherapist and non-fiction writer
- Lauren Gold (born 1980), British model
- Lee Gold, California SF fandom notable
- Les Gold, star of Hardcore Pawn
- Lex Gold (born 1940), football administrator
- Lloyd Gold (born 1950), American television soap opera writer and playwright
- Louise Gold (born 1956), British singer, actress and puppeteer
- Marian Gold (born 1954), German singer
- Mark Gold (disambiguation), multiple people

- Mark S. Gold, American medical researcher
- E. Mark Gold, American physicist, mathematician and computer scientist

- Mary Jayne Gold (1909–1997), American heiress
- Marty Gold (1915–2011), American composer, pianist, and bandleader
- Max Gold, Austrian soccer player
- Mike Gold (1893–1967), American literary critic
- Missy Gold (born 1970), American child actress
- Morton J. Gold (1917–2013), United States Air Force general
- Murray Gold (born 1969), English composer and dramatist
- Nathan Gold (1663–1723), American colonial leader and deputy governor of Connecticut
- Robin Gold, International Commissioner of the Scout Association
- Phil Gold (born 1936), Canadian physician, scientist, and professor
- Pleasant Daniel Gold (1833–1920), American publisher and clergyman
- Sam Gold (director)
- Samuel Gold, composer of chess problems
- Sharon Anderson-Gold, chair at the Science and Technology Studies Department at Rensselaer Polytechnic Institute
- Simone Gold, American anti-vaccine activist, founder of America's Frontline Doctors
- Stanley Gold, American business manager
- Tanya Gold (born 1973), British journalist
- Taylor Gold (born 1993), American Olympian snowboarder
- Ted Gold (1947–1970), radical Columbia University student leader
- Theodore Sedgwick Gold (1818–1906), American politician and farmer
- Thomas Gold (disambiguation), multiple people

- Thomas Gold (1920–2004), Austrian-born astrophysicist
- Thomas R. Gold (1764–1827), United States Representative from New York
- Thomas Gold (DJ) (born 1981), German DJ and producer
- Tom Gold (dancer), ballet dancer
- Tom Gold (rally driver), English rally driver

- Tracey Gold (born 1969), American actress
- Victor Gold (disambiguation), multiple people

- Victor Gold (chemist) (1922–1985), British chemist
- Victor Gold (journalist) (1928–2017), American journalist, author and Republican political consultant
- Victor J. Gold, dean of Loyola Law School

- Walter Kelvington Gold (1847–1895), South Australian painter
- William Gold (born 1996), known online as Wilbur Soot, British musician and internet personality
- Xaviera Gold, African American dance music singer

== Fictional characters ==
- Rumplestiltskin, also known as Mr. Gold, in television series Once Upon a Time
- Harry Gold (EastEnders), in the soap opera
- Ari Gold (Entourage), in the HBO comedy
- Mark Gold, in the film 17 Again

== See also ==
- Gould (name)
- Gold (disambiguation)
