= Gould (name) =

Origin
- Languages: England, Scotland and Ireland
- Origin: Old English

Other names
- Variant form: Gold

Gould is a surname, a variant of "Gold."

== Acting ==
- Alexander Gould (born 1994), American actor
- Dana Gould (born 1964), American comedian and writer
- Desiree Gould (1945–2021), American actress
- Elliott Gould (born 1938), American actor
- Harold Gould (1923–2010), American actor
- James Nutcombe Gould (1849–1899), English stage actor
- Jason Gould (born 1966), American actor, writer and director
- Julia Gould (1824–1893), English-born stage actress and singer
- Kelly Gould (born 1999), American actress
- Mitzi Gould (1918–2004), American actress
- Nolan Gould, (born 1998), American actor
- Peter Gould, American television drama screenwriter
- Sandra Gould (1916–1999), American actress and comedian

== Arts and letters ==
- Alan J. Gould (1898–1993), American newspaper editor
- Chester Gould (1900–1985), creator of popular comic book character Dick Tracy
- Edd Gould (1988–2012), British animator, creator of Eddsworld
- Edward Sherman Gould (1808–1885), American author, translator and critic
- Elizabeth Porter Gould (1848–1906), American poet and author
- Emily Gould (born 1981), American author
- Francis Carruthers Gould (1844–1925), British caricaturist and political cartoonist
- Gerald Gould (1885–1936), English writer, journalist, reviewer, essayist and poet
- Hal Gould (1920–2015), American photographer and gallery curator
- Hannah Flagg Gould (1789–1865), American poet
- John Jamesen Gould (J. J. Gould, born 1971), Canadian journalist and entrepreneur
- Joan Gould (1927–2022), American author and journalist
- Karen L. Gould (born 1948) American scholar of French-Canadian literature, president of Brooklyn College
- Lewis L. Gould (born 1939) American historian
- Manny Gould (1904–1975), American animator
- Mary Gould Almy (1735–1808), diarist during the American Revolution
- Nat Gould (1857–1919), English journalist and writer of horse racing novels
- Rebecca Gould, American writer, translator, and Professor of Islamic Studies
- Steven Gould (born 1955), American science fiction writer
- Thomas Ridgeway Gould (1818–1881), American sculptor
- Warwick Gould (born 1947), Australian literary scholar

== Business ==
- Andrew Gould (businessman) (born 1946), Schlumberger executive
- Erastus F. Gould (1822–1896), American businessman and banker
- George Jay Gould (1864–1923), American railroad president
- Irving Gould (1919–2004), Canadian businessman
- Jay Gould (1836–1892), American financier
- James Childs Gould (1882–1944), British/American industrialist
- Kingdon Gould Jr. (1924–2018), American businessman and diplomat
- Kingdon Gould Sr. (1887–1945), American businessman

== Math and science ==
- Alice Bache Gould (1868–1953), American mathematician, philanthropist, and historian
- Augustus Addison Gould (1805–1866), American conchologist
- Benjamin Apthorp Gould (1824–1896), American astronomer
- Elizabeth Gould (illustrator) (1804–1841), English artist, scientific illustrator and lithographer
- Elizabeth Gould (psychologist) (born 1962), professor of psychology at Princeton University
- Gordon Gould (1920–2005), American physicist, inventor of the laser
- Henry W. Gould (born 1928), American mathematician
- Ian Gould (geologist), Australian geologist, chancellor of the University of South Australia
- John Gould (1804–1881), English ornithologist and artist
- John Stanton Gould (1810–1874), American science lecturer, temperance reformer, agricultural scientist and politician
- Laurence McKinley Gould (1896–1995), American geologist, educator, polar explorer
- Rupert Gould (1890–1948), British horologist
- Stephen Jay Gould (1941–2002), American paleontologist and science writer
- William Gould (naturalist) (1715–1799), English naturalist and cleric

== Military ==
- Charles Gilbert Gould (1845–1916), Union Army soldier and Medal of Honor recipient
- Davidge Gould (1758–1847), Royal Navy admiral
- Herbert Gould (1891–1918), Royal Air Force World War I flying ace
- Michael C. Gould (born 1953), 18th Superintendent of the U.S. Air Force Academy
- Thomas William Gould (1914–2001), English recipient of the Victoria Cross

== Music ==
- Billy Gould (born 1963), American musician and producer
- Boon Gould (1955–2019), English musician, member of the band Level 42
- Glenn Gould (1932–1982), Canadian pianist
- Morton Gould (1913–1996), American composer, conductor and arranger
- Phil Gould (musician) (born 1957), English musician, member of the band Level 42
- Stephen Gould (tenor) (1962–2023), American tenor

== Politics ==
- Arthur R. Gould (1857–1946), U.S. senator
- Basil Gould (1883–1956), British political officer
- Benjamin Gould (politician) (1849–1922), South Australian politician
- Bryan Gould (born 1939), British politician
- Georgia Gould (politician) (born 1986), British politician, daughter of Philip
- James Childs Gould (1880–1944) industrialist and British Member of Parliament
- James J. Gould (1823–1909), Michigan state representative
- John Gould (MP) (c. 1695–1740), British politician and Director of the East India Company
- John Stanton Gould (1810–1874), American science lecturer, temperance reformer, agricultural scientist and politician
- Joseph Gould (politician, born 1808) (1808–1886), farmer, businessman and political figure in Ontario, Canada
- Joseph Gould (politician, born 1911) (1911–1965), Canadian politician
- Karina Gould (born 1987), Canadian politician
- Kenneth H. Gould (1938–2019), American politician
- Marti Gould Cummings, American political activist and drag queen
- Monica Gould (born 1957), Australian former politician
- Nathaniel Gould (1661–1728) (1661–1728), British politician and Governor of the Bank of England
- Nathaniel Gould (died 1738) (c. 1697–1738), British politician
- Philip Gould, Baron Gould of Brookwood (1950–2011), British political advisor
- Barbara Ayrton-Gould (1886–1950), British Labour Party politician, suffragist and pacifist

== Sports ==
- Al Gould (1888–1935), American baseball player
- Anthony Gould (cricketer) (born 2001), American football player
- Arthur Corbin Gould (1850–1903), American shooter and writer on guns
- Arthur Gould (rugby union) (1864–1919), Welsh rugby union player
- Bert Gould (1870–1913), Welsh international rugby player
- Bob Gould (rugby union) (1863–1931), Welsh international rugby player
- Bobby Gould (ice hockey) (1957–2026), National Hockey League player
- Bobby Gould (born 1946), English footballer and manager
- Carol Gould (athlete) (born 1944), English long-distance runner
- Chad Gould (born 1982), Philippines footballer, England beach soccer international
- Charlie Gould (1847–1917), American baseball player
- Donna Gould (born 1966), Australian cyclist
- Georgia Gould (cyclist) (born 1980), mountain biker
- Horace Gould (1921–1968), English motor racing driver
- Ian Gould (born 1957), English former cricketer and umpire
- James Gould (rower) (1914–1997), New Zealand rower
- Jay Gould II (1888–1935) champion tennis player
- Jonny Gould, English radio sports broadcaster
- Martin Gould (born 1981), English snooker player
- Phil Gould (rugby league) (born 1958), Australian rugby league footballer, coach and commentator
- Robbie Gould (born 1982), placekicker for the San Francisco 49ers
- Shane Gould (born 1956), Australian swimmer
- Wally Gould (1938–2018), English footballer

== Other ==
- Alfred Gould (surgeon) (1852–1922), British physician, Dean of Medicine and Vice-Chancellor of the University of London
- Arthur L. Gould (1879–1956), American educator
- Bob Gould (activist) (1937–2011), Australian activist and bookseller
- Carl Freylinghausen Gould (1873–1939), American architect
- Cecil Gould (1918–1994), English art historian
- Ezra Palmer Gould (1841–1900), minister and biblical scholar
- Frederick James Gould (1855–1938), English teacher, writer and pioneer secular humanist
- Harry Gould (editor) (died 1974), editor of the Tribune, Australian Communist newspaper
- James Gould (jurist) (1770–1838), American law school professor
- Jay Gould (1836–1892), railroad developer and speculator
- Louisa Gould (1891–1945), Jewish activist
- Matt Kennedy Gould (born 1975), American former television personality
- Matthew Gould (born 1971), British Ambassador to Israel
- Robert S. Gould (1826–1904), Texas Supreme Court justice and Confederate colonel
- Sara K. Gould, American feminist and philanthropist
- Steven B. Gould (born 1966), American lawyer and judge
- Thomas Gould (Baptist) (c. 1619–1675), first pastor of the First Baptist Church of Boston, Massachusetts
- Todd Gould, American psychiatrist

== See also ==
- Justice Gould (disambiguation)
- Gulda
