= Harry Gould =

Harry Gould may refer to:

- Harry Gould (footballer) (1925–2010), English footballer
- Harry Gould (golfer) (1914–2000), Welsh golfer
- Harry Gould (editor) (Llewellyn Harry Gould, died 1974), Australian communist and newspaper editor

== See also ==
- Henry Gould (disambiguation)
- Harry Gold (disambiguation)
