= The Communist =

The publication name The Communist may refer to:

- The Communist (UK, 1920) — weekly organ of the Communist Party of Great Britain (1920–1923), renamed Workers' Weekly in 1923.
- The Communist (UK, 2024) — monthly newspaper of the British Trotskyist Revolutionary Communist Party
- The Communist (US):
  - Series of publications issued by the Communist Party USA during various factional forms (1919–1923)
  - CPUSA's theoretical magazine (1927–1946), became Political Affairs (magazine)
- The Communist (Australia), Australian Communist Party organ from 1921 to 1923. Later known as Tribune

== Other uses ==
- The Communist (novel), a 1976 novel by Italian author Guido Morselli
- The Communist (film), Soviet film
