= David Gold =

David Gold may refer to:

- David Gold, Baron Gold (born 1951), British lawyer and Conservative life peer
- David Gold (bridge) (fl. 2000s–2020s), English bridge player
- David Gold (businessman) (1936–2023), English businessman
- David Gold (fashion retailer) (fl. 1960s), co-founder of the British fashion house Lord John
- David Gold (footballer) (born 1993), Scottish footballer
- David Gold (musician) (1980–2011), leader of the band Woods of Ypres
- David Gold (talk radio host) (1949/1950–2025), American conservative talk radio host
- Dave Gold (1932–2013), founder of 99 Cents Only chain

== See also ==
- Gold (surname)
- Dave Gould (1899–1969), Hungarian-American choreographer and dance director
- Dave R. Gould (born 1969), Canadian musician
