= Victor Gold =

Victor Gold may refer to:

- Victor Gold (chemist) (1922–1985), British chemist
- Victor Gold (journalist) (1928–2017), American journalist, author and Republican political consultant
- Victor J. Gold, dean of Loyola Law School

== See also ==
- Gold (surname)
