= Maidstone Grammar School =

Grammar school in Maidstone, England

Location
- Barton Road; Maidstone, Kent, ME15 7BT; England; 51°15′55″N 0°31′52″E

Information
- Type: Foundation Grammar School
- Motto: Olim Meminisse Juvabit "One day it will be pleasing to remember." from the Aeneid 1.203
- Established: 1549; 477 years ago
- Local authority: Kent
- Department for Education URN: 118835 Tables
- Ofsted: Reports
- Chair of Governors: Mark Rolfe
- Head teacher: Mark Tomkins
- Staff: 112
- Gender: Boys (11-16) Mixed (16-18)
- Age: 11 to 18
- Enrolment: 1,292
- Capacity: 1,314
- Houses: Barton; College; Corpus Christi; Tonbridge
- Colours: Blue; Yellow
- Alumni: Old Maidstonians
- School Song: "Gaudeamus"
- Website: http://www.mgs.kent.sch.uk/

Maidstone Grammar School (MGS) is a grammar school in Maidstone, England. The school was founded in 1549 after Protector Somerset sold Corpus Christi Hall on behalf of King Edward VI to the people of Maidstone for £200. The Royal Charter for establishment of a grammar school was also granted at this time.

== Admissions ==
Maidstone Grammar School is a selective school, taking boys at the age of 11 and over based on their 11+ results, and also admits male and female pupils at 16+ based on their GCSE results.

The school currently has 1292 pupils and 112 members of staff, with 69 teachers as of the academic year 2018–2019.

== Buildings ==
The main school building surrounds a Tudor-style quadrangle with a cloister on one side. Two new blocks were added in the 1960s and 80s to complete a second quadrangle, nicknamed the 'Court'. In 2005, a new refectory and teaching block (renamed the 'Walker Building') opened, followed by Sixth Form buildings in 2011.

Additional funding from Kent County Council allowed the school to open a designated Performing Arts building, new sports pavilion, and computing and science block between 2017 and 2019. The pavilion was constructed to replace the traditional pavilion which had fallen into disrepair, with a second floor having recently been added to house the Modern Foreign Languages department. As well as that, the school opened a refurbishment of the War Memorial Library and a new all-weather sports pitch.

== Houses ==
A house system was inaugurated in 1899 with three houses of 'School', 'East Borough' and 'West Borough'; allocation was based on local geography. In September 2007, the school reformed the tradition with the introduction of six new school houses, named after military vehicles: Challenger (purple), Churchill (yellow), Endeavour (red), Hurricane (green), Invincible (blue), and Spitfire (white). It was again reformed in September 2017, splitting the school into four houses, named after locations of the school: Barton (blue), College (green), Corpus Christi (red), and Tonbridge (yellow). This was due to the transition into vertical forms, where each form consists of a few members from every year.

== Sport ==
The main sports at the school are rugby, football and cricket, but participation also includes rowing, cross country, athletics, handball, and basketball. The school has won various district and county competitions.

In the 1999/2000 season, the 1st XI football team reached the final of the ESFA U18 Cup, narrowly losing to The Kingsway School

In the 2004/05 season, the U15 rugby team won the Schools Vase, having won the Kent Schools Cup earlier in the season, beating Oakham School 33-7.

In the 2025/26 season, the 1st XV rugby team won the National Schools Vase, beating Dame Allan's School 22-21.

== Combined Cadet Force (CCF) ==
The school has a Combined Cadet Force, with Navy, Army and RAF sections accepting students on a voluntary basis when they reach year nine. The Combined Cadet Force, in particular the Army section, has roots in the Royal Engineers. The Navy section is affiliated with HMS Collingwood and, a land establishment in Portsmouth, and also has an affiliated ship (HMS Kent (F78)). The RAF section enters teams into both regional and national competitions and has won a total of nine Air Squadron Trophies.

In 2001 two senior students pled guilty to a series of violent and racially aggravated charges relating to abuse of junior CCF cadets. Staff were accused of turning a blind eye or, according to the prosecutor, involved in some of the incidents.

== School song ==
In 1908, Rev C. G. Duffield (the headmaster from 1898 to 1913), wrote Latin lyrics to the music of music-master Dr H. F. Henniker for Gaudeamus, the school song. The words, based on verses in Virgil's Aeneid, are still sung on special occasions such as upper and lower school speech days.

== Notable events ==
In May 2016, former Maidstone Grammar School teacher Steve Restarick was found guilty of fraud charges, involving embezzling £6,258 of the school's resources over several years.

In December 2020, Maidstone Grammar School was widely reported in the news for choosing to delay the reopening of the school over concerns of the impact of Brexit on its students and staff being able to access the school.

== Notable alumni ==
Former pupils of the school are called "Old Maidstonians" and include:

Art, music & literature

- Dan Abnett, comic book writer
- William Alexander†, painter
- Edmund Blunden†, writer & poet
- Daniel Blythe, writer
- James Butler (artist) MBE, sculptor
- Philip Langridge† CBE, tenor
- Philip Moore, organist of York Minster from 1983 to 2008, organist of Guildford Cathedral from 1974 to 1983
- Christopher Smart†, poet

Business and commerce

- Richard (Dick) Beeching, Baron Beeching†, physicist, British Railways chairman, cause of the Beeching cuts
- Mark F. Watts, lobbyist & former Labour MEP
- Jason Tarry, retail, Chairman John Lewis Partnership

Media, television and film

- James Burke, science historian and TV presenter
- David Chater, television foreign correspondent and former chairman of the Old Maidstonian Society
- Andrew Dilnot CBE, principal of St Hugh's College, Oxford since 2002, and former presenter of BBC Radio 4's More or Less
- James Hillier, actor
- Paul Lewis, financial journalist and presenter of Money Box & Money Box Live on BBC Radio 4
- Kevin Loader, film and television producer
- Shaun McKenna, screenwriter
- Stuart Miles, Blue Peter presenter from 1994 to 1999
- Tom Riley, film and television actor

Military

- Lt-Gen Sir Frederick Dobson Middleton CB, Commandant from 1874 to 1884 of RMC Sandhurst
- Sir Timothy Jenner CB, Station Commander of RAF Shawbury from 1987 to 1988
- Giles Legood MBE QHC, Chaplain-in-Chief of the Royal Air Force Chaplains Branch and Archdeacon for the Royal Air Force

Politics and government

- Sir Samuel Egerton Brydges†, MP from 1812 to 1818 for Maidstone
- Nick Gibb, Conservative Minister of State for School Standards from 2010 to 2012 and from 2015 to 2021, and MP for Bognor Regis and Littlehampton since 1997
- Stuart Gilbert†, director of National Saving in the 1980s
- John Pugh, Liberal Democrat MP 2001-2017 for Southport
- Adam Sampson, Legal Services Ombudsman from 2009 to 2014 and chief executive from 2003 to 2009 of Shelter
- Mark F. Watts, Labour MEP from 1994 to 1999 for Kent East, then South East England from 1999 to 2004
- Phil Wynn Owen CB, civil servant

Religion

- Rt Rev David John Atkinson, bishop of Thetford from 2001 to 2009
- Leo Avery†, abbot of Quaarr Abbey
- Rt Rev Bob Evens, Bishop of Crediton 2004-2012
- Henry Gould†, vicar of St Paul's Cathedral 1908–1913
- George Harris (Unitarian)†
- Very Rev Robert William Pope OBE†
- Martin Warner (bishop), SSC, Bishop of Whitby 2010–12, Bishop of Chichester 2012-present

Science and academia

- Peter Day†, Fullerian Professor of Chemistry from 1994 to 2008, and Director of the Royal Institution from 1991 to 1998
- Frank Finn†, ornithologist
- Peter Heather, academic and historian
- Geoffrey Hosking, professor of Russian history from 1984 to 2007 at University College London
- William Morfill†, professor of Russian from 1900 to 1909 at the University of Oxford
- John Orrell†, theatre historian
- John Pond†, Astronomer Royal 1811–1835
- Ivan Roots†, historian, biographer of Oliver Cromwell

Sport

- David Flatman, Bath Rugby Union player
- Tom Parsons, Kent and Hampshire county cricketer
- Frank Sando, Olympic athlete, two-time winner at the International Cross Country Championships (1955, 1957), represented Great Britain in two consecutive Summer Olympic Games
- Steven Haworth, wrestler also known as Nigel McGuinness and Desmond Wolfe

Other

- Julius Brenchley†, explorer
- Francis Fane, 1st Earl of Westmorland†, English landowner and politician
- Sir Thomas Fane†, convicted of treason for his involvement in Wyatt's rebellion, sentenced to death, pardoned by Queen Mary; later became High Sheriff of Kent and was knighted for services to the crown

== Notable staff ==
- William Golding, author of Lord of the Flies, taught English and Music at the school between 1938 and 1940, when he met his wife Ann Brookfield
- John Nunn, chess grandmaster
- Steve Restarick, former professional footballer, taught P.E. at the school before his suspension in 2014 amid fraud allegations
