= Charles Gold =

Charles Gold may refer to:

- Charles Gold (British Army officer) (1768–1842), British artillery officer
- Charles Emilius Gold (1809–1871), New Zealand soldier and artist, son of the above
- Sir Charles Gold (politician) (1837–1923), Liberal member of parliament for Saffron Walden
