= Ernie Friedlander =

Australian-Jewish anti-racism activist

Ernie Friedlander OAM (born 1935) is a Holocaust survivor, and an Australian-Jewish activist working in the area of anti-racism and prejudice prevention, and runs the Moving Forward Together Association. Friedlander is also closely associated with B'nai B'rith organisation in Sydney, Australia.

== Biography ==
Ernie Friedlander was born in Vienna, Austria in 1935, however, he and his family were forced to leave the country in 1938 due to the Nazi efforts of the Anschluss, the annexation of Austria. Friedlander's family re-settled in Hungary, which was his father's birthplace. Once World War II and the Holocaust began, Friedlander's family face Nazi persecution and by the war's end, only Friedlander and his mother survived. Friedlander has attributed his survival to the kindness and humanity of an individual German soldier, who allowed he and his mother to escape from a transport to a concentration camp.

Following the war, Friedlander arrived in Australia in 1950 where he began a career in the textile industry.

=== Activism ===
In the area of community activism, Friedlander serves as the chairman of the Moving Forward Together Association, a group that promotes social harmony in Australia, commonly in conjunction with the Australian Government's annual Harmony Day. In 2007, Ernie Friedlander received the Order of Australia (OAM) for his contributions to Australian society. Related causes supported by Friedlander includes participation in the B'nai B'rith organisation, the prevention of antisemitism in Australia, and participation in the Courage to Care exhibition programs.

In 2017, Friedlander's work promoting social harmony was recognised by the New South Wales premier, Gladys Berejiklian.

In 2021, Friedlander's "Stop Racism Now AU" campaign was recognised by Australian parliamentarians from both major parties and was launched by the Governor of New South Wales, Margaret Beazley AC, QC.

=== B'nai B'rith ===
In his involvement with the Australian B'nai B'rith, Friedlander serves as President of the B'nai B'rith Alfred Dreyfus Unit in Sydney. Previously, he has served as President of B'nai B'rith New South Wales (1997–2001) and as President of the B'nai B'rith Aviv Lodge (1992–1993).

== See also ==
- Anti-Defamation Commission - a former division of B'nai B'rith in Melbourne
- Dvir Abramovich - anti-racism activist in Melbourne, formerly associated with B'nai B'rith.
