= Harry Gold (disambiguation) =

Harry Gold (Henrich Golodnitsky, 1910–1972) was a Swiss-born American scientist and spy for the Soviets.

Harry Gold or Harold Gold may also refer to:

- Harry Gold (musician) (Hyman Goldberg, 1907–2005), British dixieland jazz saxophonist and bandleader
- Harold Gold (fashion retailer), co-founder of the British fashion house Lord John
- Harry Gold (EastEnders), a fictional character in the British soap opera

== See also ==
- Henry Gold (born c. 1934), Australian photographer and environmental activist
- Harry Gould (disambiguation)
- Ari Gold (disambiguation)
