= Moving Forward Together =

Australian charitable organization

Moving Forward Together (MFT) is an Australian charitable organisation based in Sydney that promotes social harmony and the prevention of prejudice. The organisation was founded in 2005 and is led by Holocaust survivor Ernie Friedlander.

== Harmony Day campaigns ==
Moving Forward Together promotes social harmony, commonly in conjunction with the annual Australian Government's Harmony Day celebrations. The group's Harmony Day activities include community walks, poster competitions, songwriting competitions, and public exhibitions.

Moving Forward Together and its activities are recognised by Australian government members as well as by the government of New South Wales.

=== Hamony poster competition ===
Moving Forward Together runs an annual poster competition in New South Wales in conjunction with the annual Harmony Day celebrations with an emphasis on themes of pride and belonging. In 2016, competition posters were displayed at Parliament House, Sydney before being added to a travelling exhibition. In 2021, the poster competition involved submissions from over 5,300 students.

=== Stop Racism Now (campaign) ===
In 2021, the organisation initiated an anti-racism campaign titled "Stop Racism Now AU" which was launched by the Governor of New South Wales, Margaret Beazley AC, QC, as well as other Australian parliamentarians. The campaign involves promoting messages of mutual respect and understanding as well as the development of educational materials for schools in New South Wales.

The Executive Council of Australian Jewry (ECAJ), the peak representative body of the Australian Jewish community, noted the campaign in its annual study of antisemitic activity in Australia following the rejection of the Stop Racism Now campaign by a student union based in the University of Technology Sydney (UTS). The ECAJ determined that the manner in which the student union rejected the campaign's outreach efforts reflected a prevailing trend of anti-Jewish sentiment expressed by some progressive activists.

== See also ==
- Courage to Care
- Anti-Defamation Commission
