= Anthony Gould =

Anthony or Tony Gould may refer to:

- Tony Gould (arts director) (1937–2020), Australian theatre impresario, arts director, producer and manager
- Tony Gould (journalist) (1938–2026), British journalist and author
- Anthony Gould (cricketer) (born 1944), English cricketer
- Tony Gould (musician), Australian jazz musician, pianist, composer, and educator
- Anthony Gould (American football) (born 2001), American football player

== See also ==
- Anthony Golds (1919–2003), British diplomat
