= Courage to Care =

Courage to Care (also known as B'nai B'rith Courage to Care) is an organization based in Australia founded by the Jewish service organization B'nai B'rith. The group's mission is to prevent discrimination and bullying through educational programs.

The organisation's programme is student-centred, focused exclusively on the stories of people who rescued Jews during the Holocaust. The programme's aim is to convey community tolerance and living in harmony.

Courage to Care has three divisions, one based in Sydney, New South Wales (covering the states of New South Wales and Queensland), one in Melbourne, Victoria, and one based in Perth, Western Australia.

== Activities ==
Courage to Care operates a traveling exhibition featuring stories of Holocaust survivors and those who rescued them.

Other activities include programs and workshops for schools and workplaces.

In 2016, the program was delivered for new recruits at the Queensland Police Service.

== See also ==
- Courage to Care Award
- The Courage to Care (film)
- Ernie Friedlander - anti-racism activist associated with B'nai B'rith and Courage to Care
  - Moving Forward Together
- Alan Gold (author) - former Vice-President of Courage to Care
- Anti-Defamation Commission
