= Henry Gould =

Henry Gould may refer to:

- Henry Gould (priest), New Zealand churchman
- Henry W. Gould, American mathematician
- G. Henry P. Gould, American businessman, manufacturer, and politician from New York

== See also ==
- Harry Gould (disambiguation)
