= Mark Gold =

Mark Gold is the name of:

- Mark Gold, English animal rights and vegetarianism activist and writer
- Mark S. Gold, American medical researcher
- E. Mark Gold, American physicist, mathematician and computer scientist
- Mark Gold, a character in the film 17 Again

== See also ==
- Marc Gold - Canadian Senator
- Gold mark
