= Ivan Roots =

British historian

Ivan Alan Roots (3 March 1921, Maidstone, Kent – 8 February 2015) was a British historian, known as the author of The Great Rebellion (1966) and a leading expert on Oliver Cromwell.

== Biography ==
Ivan Roots was one of five sons of Frank Roots and his wife Ellen née Snashfold. He attended Maidstone Grammar School then studied at Balliol College, Oxford. At Oxford he was tutored by Christopher Hill and developed an interest in the history of England in the 17th century, especially in the period 1649–1660 and the Protestant radicals known as the Diggers. After his graduation in 1941 he joined the Royal Signal Corps and served in India and Burma. He saw action in the Battle of the Admin Box in Burma in 1944 and left the army with the rank of captain.

After WW II Roots obtained a lectureship at University College, Cardiff.

In 1967 Roots moved from Cardiff to a chair of history at Exeter, where he was dean of the Faculty of Arts (1974-77) and, from 1977, head of the department of History, then the first head of the reorganised department of History and Archaeology. With Maurice Goldsmith, of Exeter’s Politics department, he established The Rota, a publishing venture that made available, in the days before the internet, facsimile copies of scarce 17th-century tracts and books.

His best-known work is The Great Rebellion, 1642-1660, which first appeared in 1966 and is still in print today. ... Among scholars he will be remembered, too, for his first published academic work, The Committee at Stafford 1643-5, an edition of the order book of the Staffordshire county committee, a collaborative project with Pennington. Later studies of the local administration of 1640-60 inevitably reference this pioneer text. He also wrote a number of influential articles on aspects of Cromwellian governance and was responsible for fresh imprints of two major texts of the 1640s and 50s. In 1974 he reissued The Diary of Thomas Burton, first published in 1828 and an immensely valuable source; in the same year he was behind a new edition of A.S.P. Woodhouse’s Puritanism and Liberty, which contains the most accessible text of the Putney Debates of 1647.

Roots was for 12 years, from the late 1970s onwards, president of the Cromwell Association (which was started in 1937 by Isaac Foot).

He married in 1947 and was the father of a son and a daughter.

== Selected publications ==
- with Donald Pennington (ed.): The Committee at Stafford, 1643–1645 (1957)
- The Great Rebellion (1966)
- (ed.): Into Another Mould: Aspects of the Interregnum (1981)
- The Monmouth Rising (1986)
- (ed.): Speeches of Oliver Cromwell (1989)
- Cromwellian and Restoration Devon (2003)
