= Michael Bishop, Baron Glendonbrook =

British businessman and life peer

The Right Honourable The Lord Glendonbrook CBE AM

Member of the House of Lords
- Lord Temporal
- Life peerage 1 February 2011 – 24 July 2025

Personal details
- Born: Michael David Bishop; 10 February 1942 (age 84) Bowdon, Cheshire, England
- Party: Conservative
- Occupation: Businessman
- Net worth: ▼£200 million (2013)

Michael David Bishop, Baron Glendonbrook CBE AM (born 10 February 1942) is a British-Australian businessman and life peer who rose to prominence as owner of the airline BMI. He sold his stake in the airline to Lufthansa on 1 July 2009 and (as of 2008) had an estimated personal fortune of £280 million. He was one of the UK's first openly gay senior executives.

== Early life ==
Michael Bishop was born in Bowdon, Cheshire. The son of a factory boss, he was given a pleasure flight at the age of six. In 1949 his parents took him on an Aer Lingus flight to Dublin in search of chocolate, a rarity during post-war rationing.

Educated at the independent Mill Hill School in north London, he enjoyed flying and as a result took a series of school holiday jobs with an aerial photographer.

== British Midland ==
In 1963, Bishop joined the ground handling operation of Manchester-based Mercury Airlines, a schedule and charter airline, which was taken over by British Midland Airways (later re-branded as BMI) in October 1964. Bishop joined British Midland, and rose to become General Manager of the airline in 1969 and managing director in 1972.

In 1978, the London-based Minster Assets investment group, which owned British Midland, decided to sell its stake. With the help of an entrepreneurial Californian dentist, Bishop raised £2.5 million to lead a management buyout, and was subsequently appointed chairman. He later said: "I had to borrow the money from an American citizen. Most venture capitalists want a return of 40% to make up for all their other failures, and they want an exit strategy." From 1969 he was the key driving force behind the steady growth of the airline, which held 11% of the landing and take-off slots at London Heathrow Airport, second only to British Airways, and had a route network spanning Europe, North America, Asia and Africa.

Bishop formerly held a controlling 50% + 1 share stake of BMI, with German airline Lufthansa holding 30% minus 1 share, and SAS Airlines a further 20%. In October 2008, under a deal agreed in 1999 as part of the package for BMI to join the Star Alliance, Bishop agreed to sell his 50% stake to Lufthansa for an undisclosed sum, though reports suggested it was about £318m. BDLH (Lufthansa's holding vehicle) acquired Bishop's share on 1 July 2009, assuming full control of the company.

== Honours and appointments ==
Between 1991 and 1993, Bishop was deputy chairman of Channel 4 television, becoming chairman from 1993 to 1997. He was also a board member at Sir Nigel Rudd's Williams plc., and deputy chairman at Airtours.

In 1986, he was appointed CBE, and in 1991 he was knighted. The University of Leicester awarded him an honorary Doctor of Law (LL.D) degree on 12 July 2007.

In an annual survey by The Independent of the UK's most influential gay men and women, Bishop was ranked as number 5 in 2005 and number 6 in 2006.

In February 2011, Bishop was created a life peer as Baron Glendonbrook, of Bowdon in the County of Cheshire, and was introduced in the House of Lords the next month, where he sits as a Conservative.

Bishop was appointed Member of the Order of Australia (AM) in the 2023 Australia Day Honours for "significant service to the not-for-profit sector through philanthropic support".

== Arms ==
Coat of arms of Michael Bishop, Baron Glendonbrook
| Crest A nightingale singing Or grasping with the dexter foot a flute erect Gules. Escutcheon Argent three dahlia flowers Gules seeded Or slipped and leaved Vert. Supporters Dexter a pegasus Argent winged Or sinister a kangaroo Or. |

== Personal life ==
Bishop is openly gay and, since 2008, has spoken out publicly about gay rights and success in the workplace. He is often referred to as "dapper" by the press, to note his keen sense of elegance.

He has been a member of the Conservative Party since the age of 17. He is chairman of the Board of Trustees of the D'Oyly Carte Opera Company due to his personal financial sponsorship.

Bishop lives in London and at Bruern Abbey, West Oxfordshire. Since purchasing the 18th-century country house on the Bruern site in 2013, he has completely refurbished it, installing a "large and impressive cantilever stone staircase and twenty-five kilometres of data cabling" and an underground car park.

Bishop is a member of the Lord Lyon Society.

Media offices
| Preceded by Richard Attenborough | Chairman of Channel 4; 1993–97 | Succeeded by Vanni Treves |
Orders of precedence in the United Kingdom
| Preceded by The Lord Stirrup | Gentlemen; Baron Glendonbrook | Followed by The Lord Gold |
