= Alan Gold =

Alan Gold may refer to:

- Alan Gold (author) (1945–2024), author, literary critic and human rights activist
- Alan B. Gold (1917–2005), chief justice of the Quebec Superior Court
- Alan Stephen Gold (born 1944), American lawyer and judge
