= Joseph Gold =

Joseph Gold may refer to:

- Joseph Gold (lawyer) (1912–2000), international law scholar and long-time official of the International Monetary Fund
- The chemist who proposed the medical use of hydrazine sulfate in 1970s
- Joe Gold (1922–2004), American gym owner
- Joe Dan Gold (1942–2011), American basketball player and coach
