= Stuart Gilbert (civil servant) =

British civil servant

Stuart William Gilbert CB (August 1926 in Maidstone, Kent, England – December 2007 near Cambridge, England) was a British Civil Servant who was Director of National Savings from 1981 to 1986.

== Early life ==
Gilbert was born in Maidstone Kent. His father was Rodney Stuart Gilbert. His mother was Edith Esgate.

Gilbert gained entry to Maidstone Grammar School where he was a member of the ATC. His progression on to Emmanuel College Cambridge as an Open Exhibitioner and State Scholar to read history (later changed to economics), was interrupted by wartime service in the Royal Air Force.

== Royal Air Force ==
In 1943 conscripts in the UK became eligible to be chosen by lot such that ten percent of all male conscripts aged 18–25 became Bevin Boys, a programme of wartime conscription of coal mining labour. Gilbert was conscripted and volunteered for Signals Intelligence in the Royal Air Force on 30 May 1944 as an AC2 with the trade C/CSL (Clerk Signals Linguist). He joined the famous Bedford Japanese School above the gas showroom in Bedford where he learned Japanese. He was then posted via RAF Mauripur to serve in Burma with 164 S.W., 368 W.U. and 164(S) Wing. After serving close to the front line intercepting enemy signals for the Y Service feeding Bletchley Park and its outposts around the empire, Gilbert succumbed in April 1946 to malaria and was shipped back via Bombay by hospital ship. By June 1946 Gilbert had recovered sufficiently to be posted to RAF Chicksands, then in January 1947 to "NSA Boston Spa", and in February 1947 to RMU London "Gen". He was discharged on 15 September 1947, though remained in the reserve till 1959. In 2020 Gilbert was added to the Bletchley Park Roll of Honour as a former member of the Y Service, in recognition of his wartime service in the Burma Campaign.

== Civil Service career ==
Gilbert joined the British Civil Service as an assistant principal, in the Ministry of Health in 1949. He was promoted as follows: Assistant Private Secretary: to Minister of Housing and Local Government, 1952; Parliamentary Secretary, 1954; Principal, 1955; Secretary to the Parker Morris Committee on Housing Standards, 1958–61, Rapporteur to ECE Housing Committee, 1959–61; Reporter to ILO Conference on Workers’ Housing, 1960; Assistant Secretary to the Local Government Finance Division, 1964; Under-Secretary, Department of the Environment, 1970–80 (for New Towns, 1970, Business Rents, 1973, Construction Industries, 1974, Housing, 1974, Planning Land Use, 1977); Deputy Director, 1980–81, Director (Deputy Secretary grade), 1981–86, Department for National Savings.

In February 1981 Gilbert corresponded with the Financial Secretary to the Treasury in respect of likely industrial action by the Society of Civil Service and Public Servants (a trade union), in the DNS HQ Transaction Accounting Branch.

In 1980, Chancellor Geoffrey Howe had decided that National Savings should fund a substantial part of the Public Sector Borrowing Requirement (PSBR), and for the first time in its history, National Savings was given a specific target (£2Bn), and under Gilbert's leadership it met that target, and subsequent targets for 1981-82 (£3.5Bn target), and for 1982-3 (£3Bn target). In August 1983, Gilbert commented: "It's easier to run an organisation which has a clear objective". Gilbert further commented that the Department had a "close and informal relationship" with the Treasury. In 1983-84 the Department's target was again £3Bn, which at that time was about one third of PSBR.

In August 1982, Income Bonds were launched for the first time, and by the end of the financial year they had taken £891 million, after National Savings' own research suggested that there was a low awareness among the investing public of monthly income accounts. Gilbert noted that: "We don't have as large a research capacity as some institutions seem to have, but we're increasingly hoping to use outside organisations".

In May 1984 Gilbert presided over the end of the "Save as You Earn" scheme (SAYE), which was replaced by the new National Savings Yearly Plan.

On 2 August 1986, Mr J.A. Patterson succeeded Gilbert, who had previously been his deputy, as Director of Savings at National Savings.

== In retirement ==
Gilbert worked as a Trustee (1988–2002) at Upkeep (a Trust for training and education in building maintenance, formerly the Building Conservation Trust). He was Chairman, 1993–96, and Vice-President 2003–2007.

== Personal life ==
Gilbert married Marjorie Laws Vallance (1924–2004) in 1955. They had a daughter (born 1956) and a son (born 1959).

Gilbert was made Companion of the Order of the Bath in June 1983.
