= Air Squadron Trophy Competition =

Royal Air Squadron Trophy Competition
- Combined Cadet Force Badge

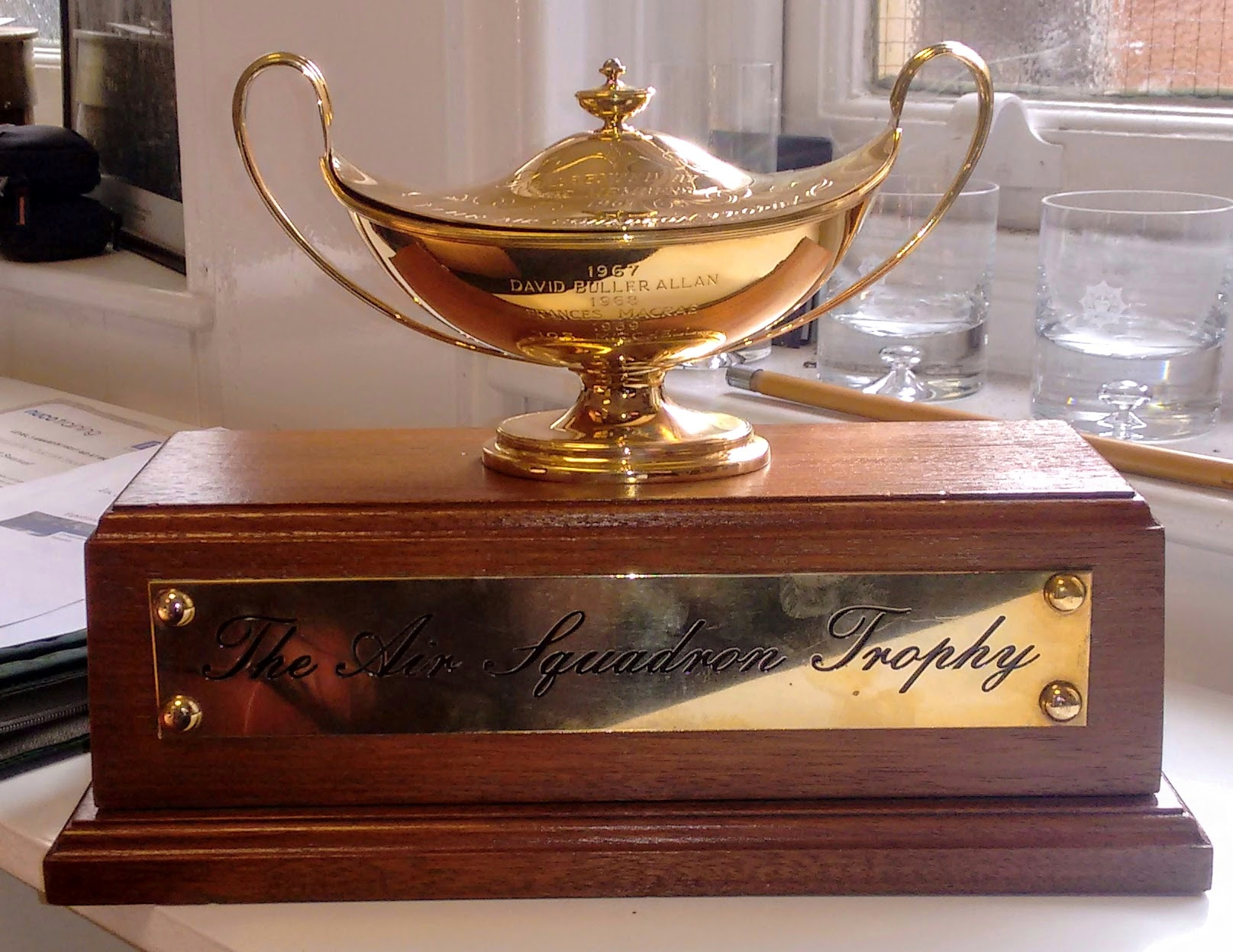
- The Air Squadron Trophy
- Nickname: National Ground Training Competition
- Frequency: Annual
- Locations: RAF Cosford, Wolverhampton, RAF Wittering (National finals), RAF Halton (former)
- Country: United Kingdom
- Inaugurated: 1985; 41 years ago
- Participants: CCF(RAF) Cadets
- Major events: Foot Drill; First Aid; Shooting; Command Task; RAF Knowledge; Aircraft Recognition; Fitness
- Patron: Royal Air Squadron
- Organiser: Combined Cadet Force
- Member: Royal Air Force Air Cadets

== Overview ==
The Royal Air Squadron Trophy Competition, also known as the National Ground Training Competition, was created as a way for Royal Air Force sections of the Combined Cadet Force to contest the Air Squadron Trophy.

The trophy has been competed for since 1985, when it was awarded to the "year's outstanding CCF(RAF) Section". Starting in 1998, the winner of the National Ground Training Competition would be awarded the trophy, marking the beginning of the modern format of the competition. The trophy had originally been presented by the Royal Air Squadron as part of the British Aerobatic Association's annual competition, first contested in 1967. The names of some of the inaugural winners are still engraved on the trophy.

RAF Air Command and the Royal Air Force Air Cadets have recognised the annual competition provides "substantial external profile and value", particularly for the competitive spirit, camaraderie, and experience the competition generates amongst cadets.

== Competition structure ==
Any CCF(RAF) section that can field a full team of 13 cadets, ideally drawn from a wide range of age groups, is able to take part in the competition. The Training, Evaluation & Support Teams (TEST) Officers & SNCOs, who act as a training and support liaison between CCF contingents and the wider RAF, tailor the "composition and conduct" of the six regional competitions to the local needs of their area, held in Autumn or Spring. The first, second, and third placed teams from each of the six regions qualify for the national finals, held at RAF Cosford in Spring each year. The competition involves a round robin of activities that include:

- Space (13 Cadets)
- Drill and Uniform (13 Cadets)
- Command Task (13 Cadets)
- Shooting (4 Cadets)
- Cyber (5 Cadets)
- First Aid (4 Cadets)

More than 230 cadets from 18 different CCF sections took part in the national finals in 2016, after the number of teams qualifying for the national round was increased from two to three per region for the first time. Individual event winners at the national finals, such as in Drill or First aid, are usually invited and given direct entry to the national competition of that discipline within the Royal Air Force Air Cadets or the wider UK Military Cadet Forces in the following year.

In 2025, changes were made to the activities on offer, modernising them inline with the RAFAC Astra campaign. Activities such as the RAF Knowledge quiz and Aircraft Recognition activity were replaced and renamed to Space and Cyber respectively.

=== Requirements for entry ===
Each team has 13 cadets: one team captain at a rank of Cadet Corporal or above, and 12 other cadets. The team should represent a "wide cross-section" of age groups from their RAF Section. The Team Captain manages the team and delivers orders in the Drill competition. An RAFAC Officer should accompany the teams to the competition.

== Royal Air Squadron Day ==
Cadets with the Air Squadron Trophy, Sir John Thomson Memorial Sword, and Geoffrey de Havilland Flying Foundation Medals, in front of a Hawker Sea Hurricane Mk.Ib (G-BKTH)

The first, second and third place teams are invited to attend the Royal Air Squadron Day which is usually held in June or July each year at the Shuttleworth Collection, a working aviation, automotive, and agricultural collection at the Old Warden Aerodrome, Bedfordshire. During the day cadets are offered flights in aircraft belonging to the Royal Air Squadron members. Past aircraft have included Tiger Moths, Dragon Rapides, YAKs, Cessnas, and helicopters.

The cadets also attend a formal parade, where the captains of the three teams receive the Geoffrey de Havilland Flying Foundation Medals for CCF Achievement along with the presentation of The Air Squadron Trophy to the first placed team. The Sir John Thomson Memorial Sword is also presented on the day to the best overall cadet in the CCF(RAF), along with Flying Foundation Medals to the six finalists of the interview process.

== Results ==
Year	1st place	2nd place	3rd place
1985	Bedford Modern School		
1986	George Heriot's School		
1987	Queen Mary's Grammar School, Walsall		
1988	Bedford Modern School		
1989	Judd School		
1990	Birkenhead School		
1991	Adams Grammar School		
1992	Monmouth School		
1993	Birkenhead School		
1994	Lancing College		
1995	Maidstone Grammar School		
1996	Queen Mary's Grammar School, Walsall		
1997	Maidstone Grammar School		
1998	Dulwich College	Victoria College, Jersey	Lancaster Royal Grammar School
1999	Maidstone Grammar School	Dulwich College	Bedford Grammar School
2000	Maidstone Grammar School		
2001	The King's School, Grantham		
2002	The King's School, Grantham		
2003	Victoria College		
2004	Maidstone Grammar School		
2005	Hampton School		
2006	Maidstone Grammar School		
2007	The King's School, Grantham	Royal Grammar School, High Wycombe	
2008	Maidstone Grammar School	The King's School, Grantham	King Edward's School, Birmingham
2009	Maidstone Grammar School	Monmouth School	King Edward's School, Birmingham
2010	Maidstone Grammar School	The Judd School	The King's School, Grantham
2011	The King's School, Grantham	Victoria College, Jersey	Wilson's School
2012	Dulwich College	The King's School, Grantham	Maidstone Grammar School
2013	Dulwich College	Maidstone Grammar School	Kimbolton School
2014	Kimbolton School	Dulwich College	Wilson's School
2015	Kimbolton School	Dulwich College	The King's School, Worcester
2016	Dulwich College	Wilson's School	Kimbolton School
2017	Wilson's School	Dulwich College	Kimbolton School
2018	Kimbolton School	Wilson's School	Loughborough Grammar School
2019	Wilson's School	Kimbolton School	Dulwich College
2020	Dulwich College	George Heriot's School	Victoria College, Jersey
2021	Not Contested (COVID-19 pandemic)		
2022	Wilson's School	George Heriot's School	Dulwich College
2023	George Heriot’s School	Loughborough Grammar School	Dulwich College
2024	Loughborough Grammar School	George Heriot’s School	Dulwich College
2025	Loughborough Grammar School	Merchant Taylors' School, Crosby	George Heriot's School
2026	Loughborough Grammar School	The King's School, Worcester	Reading School

== See also ==
- Combined Cadet Force
- Royal Air Force Air Cadets
- Royal Air Squadron
