= Thomas Gold (disambiguation) =

Thomas Gold (1920–2004) was an Austrian-born astrophysicist.

Thomas Gold may also refer to:

- Thomas R. Gold (1764–1827), United States Representative from New York
- Thomas Gold (DJ) (born 1981), German DJ and producer
- Tom Gold (dancer), ballet dancer
- Tom Gold (rally driver), English rally driver
