= Tribune (Australian newspaper) =

Official newspaper of the Communist Party of Australia

- Tribune, 1 September 1939
- Type: Weekly newspaper
- Format: Tabloid
- Owner: Communist Party of Australia
- Editor: Harry Gould
- General manager: Jack Simpson; Adam Ogston
- Staff writers: Rupert Lockwood; Malcolm Salmon
- Joint editor: Norman Jeffery
- Founded: September 1, 1939
- Ceased publication: April 3, 1991
- Language: English
- City: Sydney, Australia
- Country: Australia
- Circulation: 30,000 to 40,000
- ISSN: 2204-8782 (print); 2204-8790 (web)
- Website: trove.nla.gov.au/newspaper/title/1002

Tribune was the official newspaper of the Communist Party of Australia. It was published by the Central Committee of the Communist Party of Australia from 1939 to 1991. Initially it was subtitled as Tribune: The People's Paper. It was also published as the Qld Guardian, Guardian (Melbourne), Forward (Sydney). It had previously been published as The Australian Communist, (1920–1921) The Communist, (1921–1923) and the Workers' Weekly (1923–1939).

The Tribune for the years 1939–1991 has been digitised, as part of the Australian Newspapers Digitisation Program of the National Library of Australia.

== Publication history ==
The Tribune was the flagship of Australia's left wing newspapers.

=== Two competing papers ===
Two newspapers claiming to represent the Communist Party of Australia were published 1920–1921:

The Australian Communist was a weekly newspaper published from Sydney, Australia between 24 December 1920 and 29 April 1921. In total, 19 issues of The Australian Communist were published. Tom Glynn served as the editor of The Australian Communist until 25 March 1921. For the last issues C.W. Baker served as the editor.
The International Communist

=== The Communist ===
In May 1921 the two publications merged as The Communist. It continued publishing under the new title from 1921 to 1923.

=== Workers' Weekly ===
The Communist folded in 1923 to be replaced by Workers' Weekly which became the official organ of the CPA. Esmonde Higgins served as editor of the Weekly until 1925.

Workers' Weekly ceased publication in 1939, Tribune becoming the official organ. Both CPA papers reviewed New Theatre productions, including the period 1948–1960 when that theatre was blacklisted by the major newspapers.

=== Tribune ===
The Tribune was, on 24 May 1940, banned for publication within Australia on the grounds of weakening the war effort, along with Soviets To-day (Sydney), Communist's Review (Sydney), The Wharfie (Sydney), The Militant (imported), World Peace (Sydney). The Guardian (Melbourne), Workers' Star (Perth), and North Queensland Guardian (Townsville). On 15 June 1941 the Communist Party was banned and hundreds of properties were searched for printing presses and evidence of illegal membership.

On 29 July 1941 Tribune returned as a pamphlet, initially printed on rough paper using a manual press, which had been purchased by editor Harry Gould in anticipation of such an action. Searches by Commonwealth police failed to discover its location. The Socialist newspaper Forward (board members included Lance Sharkey, Jim Healy, Tom Wright and Ernie Thornton, with Harry Gould as business manager) acknowledged its communist affiliation in 1942, when it became a partial replacement for the Tribune, and merged with that paper when its legal status was restored.

On 3 June 1943, restrictions on the Communist Party having been lifted, the paper was re-launched as Tribune; The People's Paper, an 8-page publication with a new print series: Volume 1, No. 1, published every Thursday, price 3d. (Note: Three pence; perhaps $2 in today's money.)

In 1945 T. N. P. "Big Tom" Dougherty, general secretary of the Australian Workers' Union, was awarded £1500 in damages in a libel suit against Tribune in respect of an article which appeared in the issue of 8 February 1945.

The paper was declared illegal one more time, briefly, in the early 1950s.

=== Summary ===
Publication	Commenced publication	Ceased publication
The International Socialist	1910	1920
The Australian Communist	1920	1921
The Communist	1921	1923
Workers' Weekly	1923	1939
Tribune	1939	1991

== Staff ==
In 1941 Jack Simpson was manager of the paper. When it became illegal, he moved to Western Australia, where he was jailed.

In 1943 Harry Gould was editor and Adam Ogston the manager.

In 1946 Norman Jeffery and Harry Gould were joint editors.

== See also ==
- List of newspapers in New South Wales
- List of newspapers in Australia
