= Courage to Care Award =

Award to honor rescuers of Jews during the Holocaust era

Since April 23, 1987, the Anti-Defamation League has awarded the Courage to Care Award to honor rescuers of Jews during the Holocaust. In 2011, the award was renamed the Jan Karski Courage to Care Award in honor of one of its 1988 recipients, Jan Karski, a Polish Righteous who provided one of the first eyewitness accounts of the Final Solution to the West.

== Background ==
Since 1962, the Yad Vashem Holocaust Martyrs' and Heroes' Remembrance Authority conferred the title "Righteous Among the Nations" on non-Jews who risked their lives to save Jews. Yad Vashem was established in 1953 to perpetuate the memory of the Jewish world destroyed in the Holocaust. A special committee is impaneled to study the evidence gathered from survivors and documents in order to establish the authenticity of each rescue story. To date, over 9,000 men and women have been so honored by Yad Vashem.

In addition to examining its own records, ADL consults with Yad Vashem before conferring the Courage to Care award. The Courage to Care program is sponsored by Eileen Ludwig Greenland.

== Award ==
The award plaque features miniature bas-reliefs depicting the backdrop for the rescuers’ exceptional deeds during the Nazi persecution, deportation and murder of millions of Jews. It is a replica of the plaques which constitute the Holocaust Memorial Wall created by noted sculptor Arbit Blatas, who also created the Holocaust Memorial in Paris and the display in the old ghetto of Venice. The award is given during specific programs and ceremonies sponsored by the ADL, often occurring several times a year, when possible.

Miep Gies and her husband Jan received the first Courage to Care award on Thursday, April 23, 1987.

== Recipients ==
Courage to Care honorees.

- János Eszterházy, 2011
- Irene Gut Opdyke, 2009
- Gilberto Bosques Saldivar, 2008
- Eduardo Propper de Callejón, 2008
- Clara M. Ambrus (Bayer), 2008
- Martha and Waitstill Sharp, 2007
- Khaled Abdelwahhab, 2007
- Ernst Leitz II, 2007
- Mefail and Njazi Biçaku, 2007
- Hiram "Harry" Bingham IV, 2006
- Nicholas Winton, 2006
- Konstantin Koslovsky, 2006
- The People of Turkey, (accepted by Prime Minister Recep Tayyip Erdogan, 2005)
- Giovanni Palatucci, 2004
- Dimitrios P. Spiliakos, 2004
- Kostas Nikolaou, 2003
- Johanna Vos, 2003
- The Partisans of Riccone, Italy, 2003
- Hans Georg Calmeyer, 2002
- Hannah Pick-Goslar, 2000
- Monsignor Beniamo Schivo, 1999
- The People of Bulgaria (accepted by President Petar Stoyanov), 1998
- Shyqyri Myrto, 1997
- Renia & Jerzy Kozminski, 1996
- Emilie & Oskar Schindler, 1993
- Alice & Paul Paulus, 1993
- People of Denmark, 1993
- Peter Vlcko, 1991
- Stefania Burzminski née Podgórska, 1991
- Mela & Alex Roslan, 1990
- Friedrich Born, 1990
- Marion P. Pritchard, 1990
- Jan and Anna Puchalski, 1989
- Le Chambon-sur-Lignon, 1989
- Chiune Sugihara, 1989
- Selahattin Ülkümen, 1988
- Jan Karski, 1988
- Aristides De Sousa Mendes, 1987
- Jan & Miep Gies, 1987

== See also ==
- Courage to Care (organization)
- The Courage to Care (film)
