= Dvir Abramovich =

Israeli-Australian academic, columnist, and editor

- דביר אברמוביץ
- Born: 1 January 1971 (age 55)

Academic background
- Education: Monash University, University of Melbourne
- Thesis: Bringing the Margins to the Centre : the Ethnic-Tribal Novel, Second Generation Holocaust Literature and Detective Fiction in the Contemporary Israeli Canon (2000)

Academic work
- Discipline: Jewish studies
- Institutions: University of Melbourne
- Main interests: Hebrew language, Israel, Holocaust studies

Dvir Abramovich (Hebrew: דביר אברמוביץ; Russian: Двир Абрамович; born 1971) is an Israeli-Australian Jewish studies academic, columnist, and editor. Abramovich is the chairman of the Anti-Defamation Commission (ADC), a former division of B'nai B'rith in Melbourne, and director of the Program for Jewish Culture and Society at The University of Melbourne. Abramovich's areas of study are the Hebrew language, Israel and Holocaust studies.

== Career ==
=== Education ===
Abramovich attended Monash University where he earned his undergraduate degrees in Arts and Law. In 1995 he earned an MA in Jewish Studies and in 1999 a PhD from The University of Melbourne. He won the A.D. Hallam Prize for excellence in Hebrew studies in 1992.

=== Academia ===
Abramovich began teaching Hebrew language and literature at The Centre for Jewish History and Culture at the University of Melbourne. He was appointed Centre Director in 2006. While at the university, Abramovich has taught a range of subjects including Hebrew language at various levels, as well as Introduction to Modern Jewish Culture, Israeli Film, A History of Israel, A History of the Arab Israeli conflict, "Jerusalem in Jewish Literature", "Reading the Holocaust" and "Israel: Conflicts and Culture". He has helped foster links between Israeli and Australian tertiary institutions.

Abramovich has served as editor of the Australian Journal of Jewish Studies (from 2002 to 2010) and as president of the Australian Association for Jewish Studies.

An area of interest are the works of Israeli author Amos Oz, Abramovich nominated Oz for an honorary Doctor of Letters which the writer was awarded at The University of Melbourne in August 2011.

He has authored a number of books. He has been co-editor of the 2008 book Testifying to the Holocaust and author of Back to the Future: Israeli Literature of the 1980s and 1990s, as well as Hebrew Classics: A Journey Through Israel Timeless Prose and Poetry.

=== Anti-Defamation Commission ===
Abramovich is the chairman of the community group Anti-Defamation Commission (ADC), whose purview is to fight all racism and hate, although Abramovich has shifted the focus of the organisation to antisemitism, Holocaust trivialization and Israel advocacy. Originally, the ADC was a division of B'nai B'rith in Melbourne. However, the organisation since became an independent entity.

Commonly, Abramovich's activism involves protesting perceived actions that exploits or trivialises the legacy and memory of the Holocaust and its victims. Abramovich has spoken out against Holocaust trivialisation and any perceived exploitation for ideological and artistic purposes. He has criticised the tendency to use the Holocaust as material for Hollywood films, and opposes the use of Holocaust imagery by artists and comedians. Abramovich has objected to the use of Holocaust imagery by comedians.

In one instance, Abramovich took issue with a skit by John Safran on his 2009 show Race Relations in which the presenter made out in Anne Frank's attic with his supposed girlfriend Katherine Hicks, whom Safran described as a "A blonde-haired Aryan". Abramovich wrote that "Safran's exploitative approach drains the Holocaust of its tragic context (the death camps, the starvation, the shootings, the burning of bodies, the mounds of hair, shoes and glasses)". Another comedic stunt by Safran that Abramovich reacted to was a mock-gassing of Holocaust denier David Irving. Abramovich saying "Why didn't anyone tell him (Safran)... that there was no humour to be mined from atrocity, that trivialising genocide for silly comic pay-off is inexcusable?"

In 2017, Justice Michael Kirby compared the same sex marriage plebiscite to aspects of the Nazi regime. On this matter, Abramovich was at odds with the Executive Council of Australian Jewry. Abramovich responded to Kirby that "invoking such inappropriate and offensive analogies to advance any agenda undermines the historical truth and the meaning of the Holocaust, and only serves to trivialise the extermination of six million Jews and millions of others, which, as we know, included gay people." while ECAJ responded that Abramovich's views were a "misconstruction of Justice Kirby's comments in the media and was manifestly unwarranted." Abramovich responded by criticising the ECAJ for increasing divisions in the community.

Abramovich and the Anti-Defamation Commission under his leadership have been criticised for focusing too much on defending the Israeli government and targeting anti-Zionists rather than its original mission of challenging racism and bigotry. One of the critics, the Australian Jewish Democratic Society, have alleged that Abramovich has used his position in the ADC for self-aggrandisement.

=== Other activities ===
Abramovich has been a columnist at The Australian Jewish News since 2001, authoring the Counterpunch column. He has also contributed opinion pieces for both Fairfax and News Ltd publications.

Abramovich is notable within the Jewish community and at times has been asked to speak at communal events, such as the Melbourne Writers Festival, Melbourne Film Festival as well as being interviewed on ABC Radio.

In July 2024, Abramovich claimed on Melbourne radio station 3AW that a Hamas flag had been flown at Melbourne's Fitzroy Gardens. He called the display of the flag, which was later revealed by Media Watch to be a flag commemorating the martyrdom of the grandson of Muhammad, "a declaration of war ... against every Australian". While 3AW and the Herald Sun removed references to the story, the interview remains on Abramovich's Facebook page.

== Published works ==
=== Books ===
- Abramovich, Dvir (1995). Stereotypes and Myths : Gender Binarisms and Dominant Patriarchal Ideologies in the Fiction of Amos Oz (M.A. Thesis). Melbourne: University of Melbourne.
- Abramovich, Dvir (2000). Bringing the Margins to the Centre : the Ethnic-Tribal Novel, Second Generation Holocaust Literature and Detective Fiction in the Contemporary Israeli Canon (PhD Thesis). Melbourne: University of Melbourne.
- Abramovich, Dvir (2011). Back to the Future : Israeli Literature of the 1980s and 1990s. Newcastle: Cambridge Scholars. ISBN 9781443833387.
- Abramovich, Dvir (2012). Hebrew Classics : A Journey Through Israel's Timeless Fiction and Poetry. Boston: Academic Studies Press. ISBN 9781618110756.
- Abramovich, Dvir (2014). Flashpoints : Israel, Anti-semitism and the Holocaust. Ormond: Hybrid Publishers. ISBN 9781925000900.

=== Chapters and articles ===
- Abramovich, Dvir (2003). "Beyond Right and Wrong There is a Field - I'll Meet You There: Reconciliation Efforts between Israelis and Palestinians". Arena Journal. 22: 83–97. ISSN 1320-6567.
- Abramovich, Dvir (2005). "Overcoming the Cultural Barriers of Conflict: Dialogue between Israelis and Palestinians, Jews and Muslims". Journal of Intercultural Studies. 26 (4): 293–313. doi:10.1080/07256860500270189. ISSN 0725-6868. S2CID 144367535.
- Abramovich, Dvir (2007). "Eli Amir's Mafriah Hayonim". Modern Judaism. 27 (1): 1–19. doi:10.1093/mj/kjl008. ISSN 0276-1114.
- Abramovich, Dvir (2007). "Messianic Jews in Australia: a clash or hybrid?". Australian Jewish Historical Society Journal. 18 (4): 615–639. ISSN 0819-0615.
- Abramovich, Dvir (2011). "Relationship Building in the Middle East among Adversaries: Israelis and Palestinians". In Anceschi, L.; Camilleri, J.; Palapathwala, R.; Wicking, Andrew (eds.). Religion and Ethics in a Globalizing World: Conflict, Dialogue, and Transformation. Palgrave Macmillan. pp. 117–140. ISBN 978-1-349-28921-9.
- Abramovich, Dvir (2011). "Jesus-Believing Jews in Australia: Celebrate Messiah as a Case Study". Studies in Christian-Jewish Relations. 4 (1). doi:10.6017/scjr.v4i1.1518.

== See also ==
- Ernie Friedlander - B'nai B'rith anti-racism activist in Sydney
