= Harry Gould (footballer) =

English footballer

Personal information
- Full name: Henry Gould
- Date of birth: 5 January 1925
- Place of birth: Birkenhead, England
- Date of death: 20 May 2010 (aged 85)
- Place of death: Preston, England
- Position: Inside forward

Senior career*
Years	Team	Apps	(Gls)
1946–1949	Tranmere Rovers	5	(2)
1949–1950	Northwich Victoria		
1950–1951	Southport	16	(2)
Total		21	(4)
- * Club domestic league appearances and goals

Harry Gould (5 January 1925 – 20 May 2010) was an English footballer, who played as an inside forward in the Football League for Tranmere Rovers and Southport.
