= The International Socialist (newspaper) =

Newspaper in Sydney, Australia, from 1910 to 1920

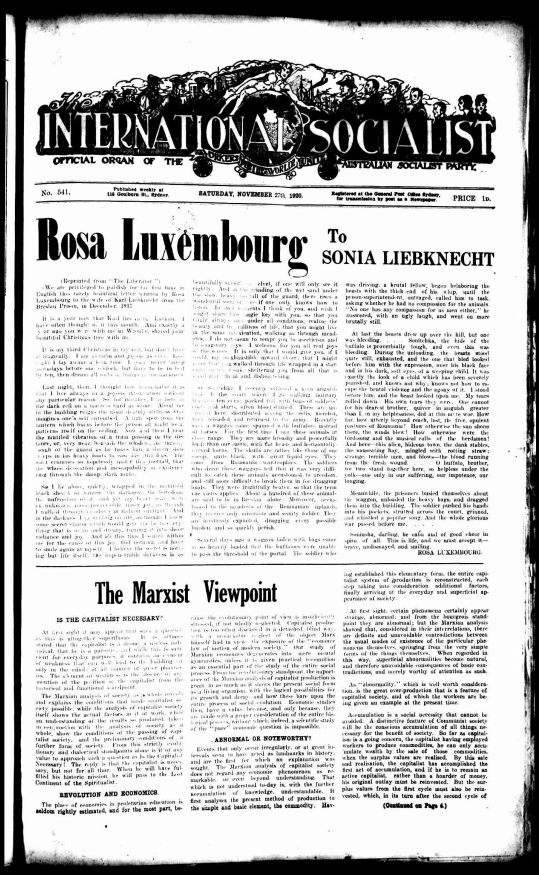
Image from the front page of 27 November 1920 issue with a letter written by Rosa Luxemburg.

The International Socialist was a newspaper published in Sydney, Australia from 1910 to 1920. It has also been published as International Socialist Review for Australasia.

== History ==
The International Socialist Review for Australasia was first published on 30 April 1910. It was printed and published by Henry Edmund Holland from 1910 to 1920 for the International Socialists, and by William Robert Winspear after 4 November 1916 for the Sydney Branch of the Australasian Socialist Party. It was labelled as the Official organ of revolutionary socialism in N.S.W. and later continued to be published as The International Communist. The newspaper in 1920 became The Australian Communist following the formation of the Communist Party of Australia.

== Digitisation ==
This paper has been digitised as part of the Australian Newspapers Digitisation Program project of the National Library of Australia.

== See also ==
- List of newspapers in Australia
- List of newspapers in New South Wales
