= Adam Sampson =

Adam Sampson (born 13 June 1960) was previously the Chief Ombudsman of the Legal Ombudsman, the free service that investigates complaints about lawyers in England and Wales. He took up the post on 1 July 2009: prior to this he was the chief executive of the charity Shelter for seven years.

He was dismissed in November 2014 after ‘irregularities’ were found with his expenses claims.

As of 2012 he was the chair of the charity FareShare, a Commissioner on the UK Drug Policy Commission and non-executive chairman of C4H, a community interest housing company.

As of 2021, he was the CEO of the Association of Optometrists.

== Personal life ==
He is married with two children.
