= Julia Gould =

English-American blackface performer (1824–1893)

- Born: Julia Wildman Gould; 28 August 1824; London, England
- Died: 29 January 1893 (aged 68); Kinmundy, Illinois, U.S.
- Occupation(s): Singer, actress
- Years active: 1835–1869

Julia Wildman Gould (28 August 1824 – 29 January 1893) was an English-born singer and actress, who was the first woman to become a leading blackface performer in American minstrel shows.

== Life and career ==
She was born in London into a musical family, in 1824 according to official records though historian Kurt Gänzl suggests 1819. Her mother, Caroline Gould née Wildman, married Henry James Panormo, the grandson of Sicilian-born luthier Vincenzo Panormo, in 1827, and, as Mme. Gould Panormo, became a singing teacher in London in the 1830s. Julia's brother, Napoleon Gould (1819–1881), became a well-known musician on guitar, banjo and concertina. He moved to New York City in 1848, and performed in minstrel shows, appearing in New York in the 1860s with Christy's Minstrels, Bryant's Minstrels, and others.

Julia Gould was first known to have performed in 1835, as a soprano singer in an oratorio written by her stepfather. She toured the country with her stepfather, mother and brother, until her stepfather's death in Kent in 1839. In 1841, credited as a pupil of John Barnett, she appeared at the newly established English Opera House in Michael Balfe's opera Keolanthe, and then in Ambroise Thomas' comic opera The Matrimonial Ladder. Her performance in the latter was praised in The Times as having "a great deal of sprightliness and a certain quaint oddity of manner which was very amusing." For the next two years, she performed frequently in London at the English Opera House, the Theatre Royal, Drury Lane, the Princess's Theatre, and elsewhere, but was injured in a fall when performing in Handel's Acis and Galatea.

She appeared onstage again in 1848, and the following year emigrated to the United States to join her brother. For the next four years, she appeared regularly in theatre performances in New York City, as well as in oratorios, concerts, operettas and comedies, sometimes working together with her friend Laura Keene. She made her first trip to California in 1853, in the company of actress Catherine Norton Sinclair, and remained there for three years. In San Francisco, she sang and performed with various theatre companies, in some cases alongside Laura Keene, Anna Thillon, and Anna Bishop.

In 1855, she married John Holywell Collins in San Francisco. He was a well-established blackface performer with several minstrel companies, including the Buckley Serenaders. Initially she continued with orthodox theatre performances, but in 1856 she and her husband moved to New York, and shortly afterwards she began performing with the Buckley Serenaders. She became the featured star of the troupe, travelling around the U.S., and returning to Britain to perform with the minstrel show. Described as the minstrels' prima donna, she performed a mixture of songs and scenes. Minstrelsy historian Edward Le Roy Rice wrote that she "was an actress of rare and versatile talents", and that she "was the first woman to achieve prominence in minstrelsy.... She essayed the principal female roles in the great operatic burlesque that made the Buckleys famous, always appearing in blackface".

Her husband, John Collins, died in Cuba in 1860 while touring with another minstrel company. She continued to perform with the Buckley Serenaders until 1863, when, after becoming a naturalized citizen, she sought to return to California. On her journey, a group of secessionists tried but failed to take over her ship, the bark Emily Banning, and the trunk containing her belongings was lost. The subsequent legal action in which she tried to recover the disputed value of her belongings, Julia Gould Hall v. The Bark “Emily Banning”, 33 Cal. 522 (1867), reached the Supreme Court of California, and became the subject of legal rulings on the admissibility of conflicting evidence which set a legal precedent for decades to come.

She returned safely to California, and performed with Maguire's San Francisco Minstrels in 1864. The following year she remarried, to a Scottish-born doctor, Alexander Hall (1819–1909). She continued to perform in concerts and theatre performances in San Francisco until 1869, when she retired from the stage. She and her husband then moved to Kinmundy, Illinois, where Alexander Hall set up a farm and Julia taught music and painting. Her pupils included William Lines Hubbard, later a widely respected music critic and author.

She died in Kinmundy, Illinois, in 1893, probably aged 68.
