= Erastus F. Gould =

American businessman and banker

Erastus Franklin Gould
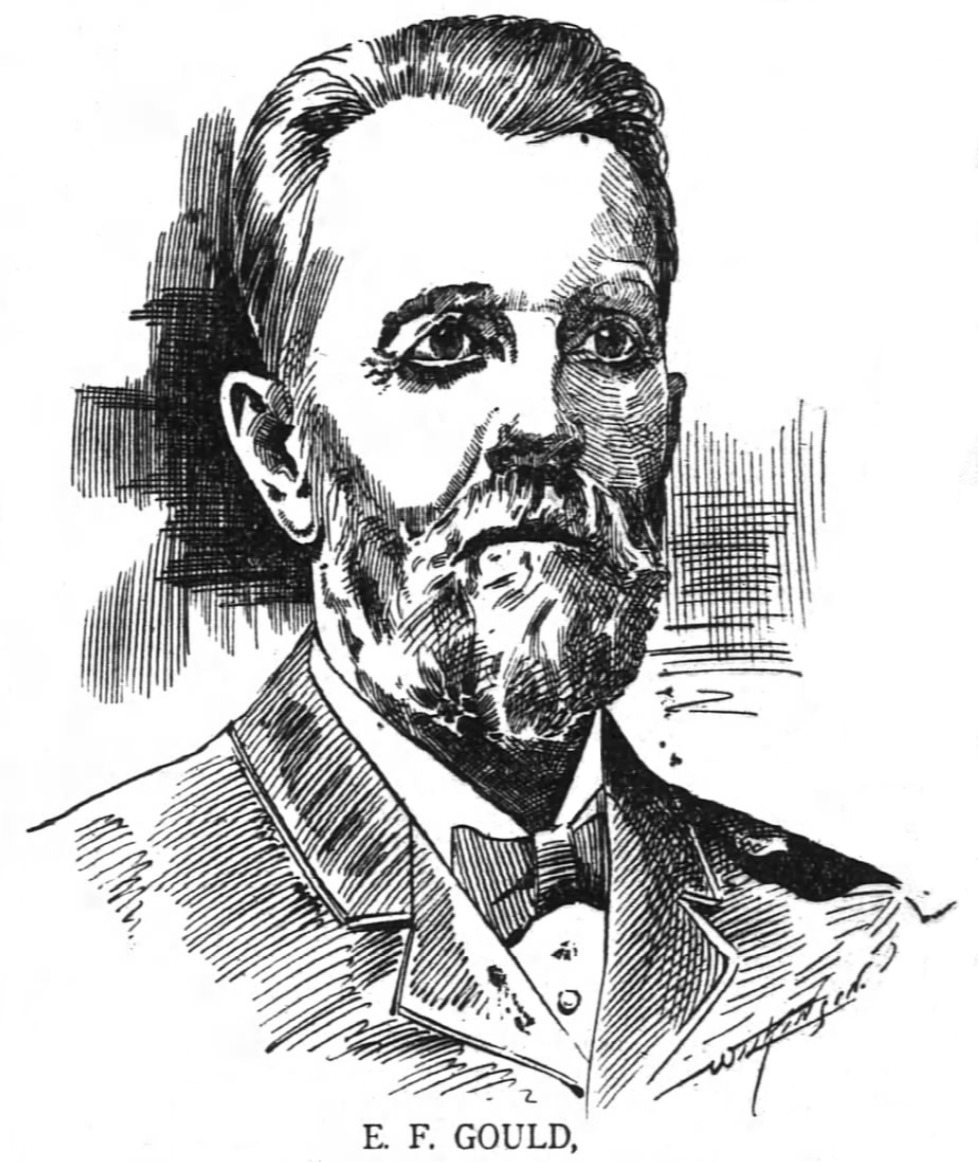
- Born: July 1, 1822; Oswego County, New York, United States
- Died: June 2, 1896 (aged 73); Atlanta, Georgia, United States
- Resting place: Oakland Cemetery (Atlanta)

Erastus Franklin Gould (July 1, 1822 – June 2, 1896) was an American businessman and banker during the 19th-century. Born in Oswego County, New York, he became a successful businessman in the banking industry in Minneapolis, Minnesota before moving to Atlanta, Georgia in 1886.

== Early life ==
Erastus Franklin Gould was born in Oswego County, New York. He later move to Minneapolis, where he became financially successful in the banking industry.

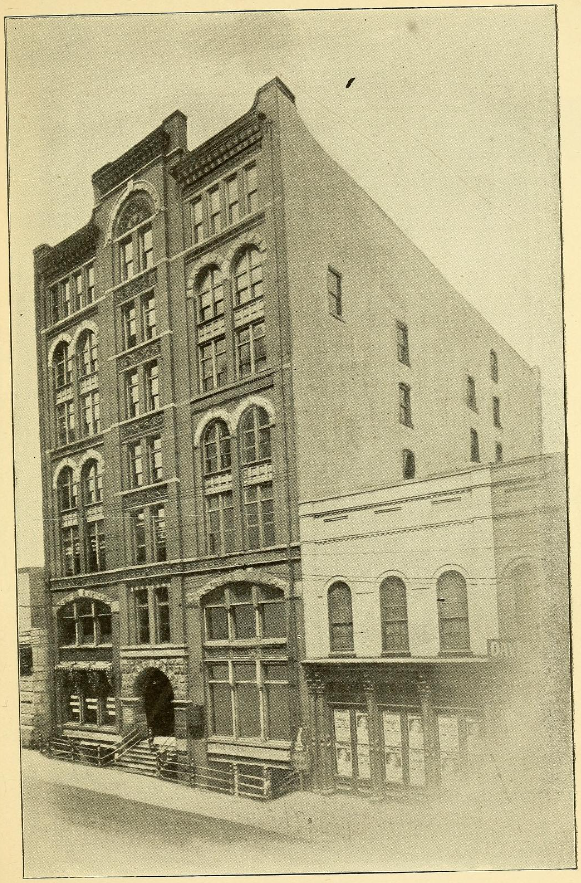
The Gould Building in Atlanta, c. 1907

In 1886, he moved to Atlanta. The following year, he helped found the Traders Bank of Atlanta, which was chartered on October 24, 1887, and officially opened November 1, 1888. Other founders included Hugh T. Inman and Clifford Anderson. Gould had constructed the bank's headquarters in 1887 on Decatur Street. Known as the Traders Bank Building, it was the first office-building skyscraper in Atlanta, rising 7 stories. In 1890, following the renaming of the Traders Bank, the building was known as the Gould Building. Additionally, Gould also had a home constructed for himself in Inman Park. Located on Edgewood Avenue, it was known as "Gould's Marble Palace" because of the Georgia marble used in the building's construction.

== Later life and death ==
Gould died on June 2, 1896, in Atlanta. He was interred in a mausoleum in Oakland Cemetery. The Gould Building was demolished several years after his death in 1935.

== Bibliography ==
- Davis, Ren; Davis, Helen (2012). Atlanta's Oakland Cemetery: An Illustrated History and Guide. University of Georgia Press. ISBN 978-0-8203-4313-6 – via Google Books.
- Garrett, Franklin M. (1969). Atlanta and Environs: A Chronicle of Its People and Events, 1880s-1930s. Vol. II. University of Georgia Press. ISBN 978-0-8203-3904-7 – via Google Books.
- Hornady, John R. (1922). Atlanta, Yesterday, Today and Tomorrow. American Cities Book Company – via Google Books.
