= Axogen =

- Traded as: Nasdaq: AXGN; Russell 2000 Component
- Founded: 1 January 2002
- Headquarters: United States

Axogen is a developer of surgical solutions, including human tissue grafts, based in Tampa, Florida. Axogen products are designed to remedy peripheral nerve damage. In 2013 the company raised $18 million in its initial public offering (IPO). Axogen uses a cell graft technology Avance to mimic a human nerve. The company also creates nerve connectors and soft tissue membranes. The company reports sensory and movement recovery in 87 percent of patients with peripheral nerve injuries. Axogen is part of the Sid Martin Biotechnology Incubator.

As of 2019, Axogen was the only commercially available nerve allograft approved by the Food and Drug Administration (FDA) for clinical use.

== See also ==
- Nerve allograft
