= John Stanton Gould =

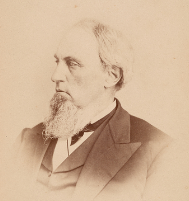
- A photograph of John Stanton Gould by Purdy & Frear
- Born: March 14, 1812; Newport, Rhode Island, United States
- Died: August 8, 1874 (aged 62); Hudson, New York, United States

John Stanton Gould (March 14, 1812 - August 8, 1874) was a 19th-century Quaker scientist and philanthropist of the United States.

== Biography ==
Gould was a member of the Society of Friends. He received a thorough education, especially in physical science, and was well known as an industrious student and a popular essayist and lecturer on scientific subjects. He had a farm in Columbia County, New York and took an active part in agricultural improvement. For several years, he was president of the New York State Agricultural Society and did much to advance its interests.

He was also an earnest temperance advocate. Although in earlier years he was a Whig, and a member of the assembly from that party in 1846 (subsequently acting generally with the Republicans), he held his temperance principles above party allegiance, and was recognized as a prohibitionist. He was much interested in the subject of prison reform and was for many years one of the directors and executive officers of the New York Prison Association.
