= Henry Gould (priest) =

Henry George Gould (b Wolverhampton 4 January 1851 – d Dunedin 28 September 1914) was the Archdeacon of Oamaru from 1897 until his death.

Gould was born in Wolverhampton and educated at Maidstone Grammar School; and ordained in 1877. His first post was as Curate at Malvern. Later he held incumbencies at Woodend, Leithfield, Hokitika and Lincoln. He was Vicar of St. Paul's Cathedral, Dunedin from 1907.
