= Mark S. Gold =

American physician and academic

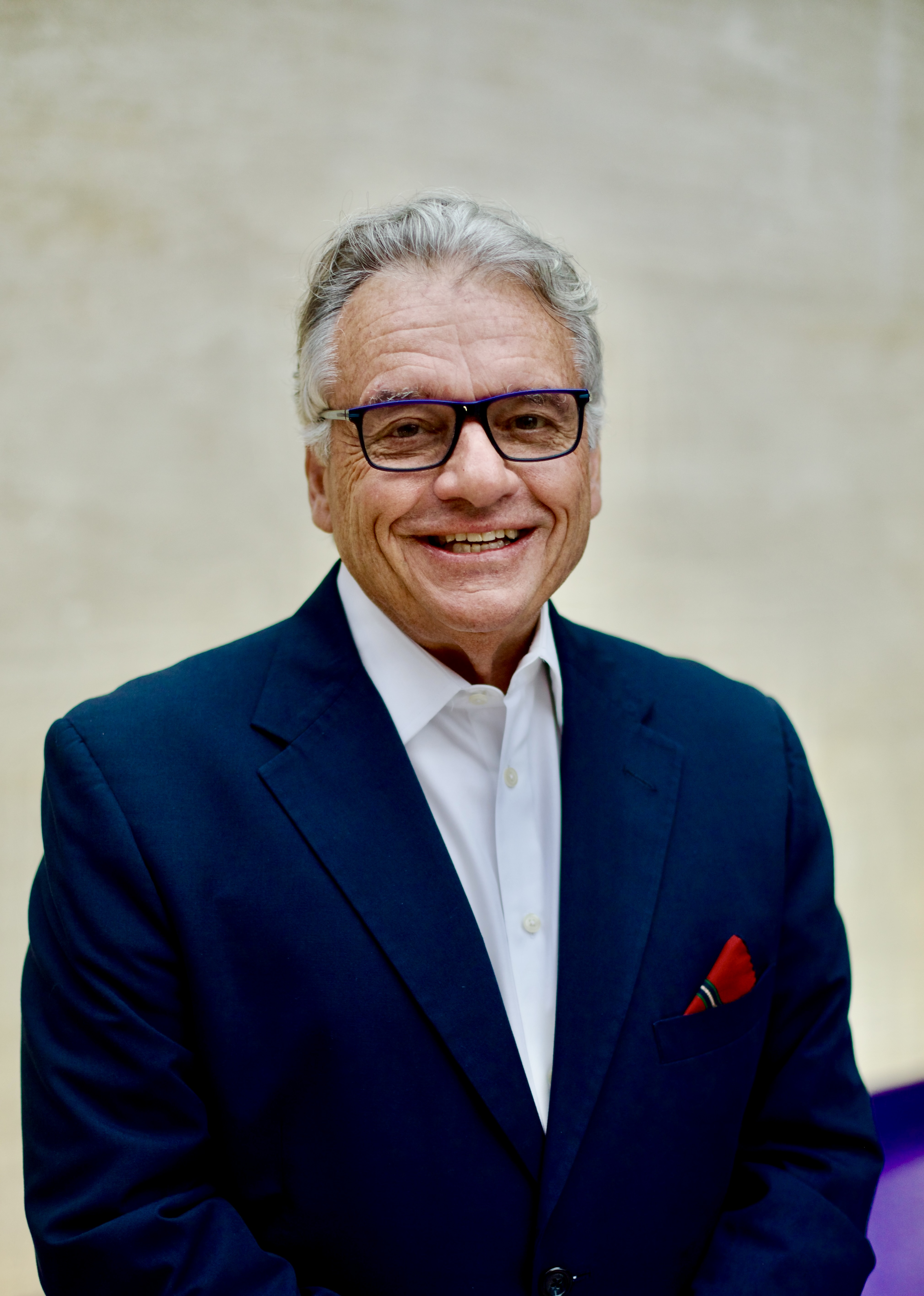
- Born: 1949 (age 76–77)
- Education: Washington University in St. Louis; University of Florida
- Scientific career
- Workplaces: Yale School of Medicine; University of Florida College of Medicine; University of Southern California; Tulane University School of Medicine; Washington University School of Medicine

Mark S. Gold (born 1949) is an American physician, academic, and researcher known for his work on the effects of opioids, cocaine, tobacco, and food on brain function and behavior. He has held academic positions as a professor of neuroscience and psychiatry and served as chair of the Department of Psychiatry at the University of Florida College of Medicine, where he established the Division of Addiction Medicine.

Gold's research has focused on the mechanisms underlying opioid addiction, particularly the role of the locus coeruleus in dependence and withdrawal, contributing to treatment methods developed in 1978. He contributed to the use of opioid antagonists, such as naltrexone, in treating opioid addiction and helped develop treatment strategies for substances including cocaine, methamphetamine, and alcohol. His research on dopamine's role in addiction extended to compulsive behaviors like overeating and gambling, examining links between substance addiction and behavioral compulsions. His work also contributed to the concept of food addiction, especially regarding highly processed, high-fat, and high-sugar foods.

== Early life and education ==
Raised in Teaneck, New Jersey, Gold graduated from Teaneck High School in 1967. He attended Washington University in St. Louis, graduating with honors in psychology and was inducted into Phi Beta Kappa. In 1987, he received a Distinguished Alumni Award from Washington University.

Gold began his career at the University of Florida in 1970, researching brain processes related to sleep and memory in the Department of Neuroscience. He later earned his medical degree from the University of Florida College of Medicine and completed a psychiatry residency and fellowship at Yale University School of Medicine.

== Career ==
At the University of Florida, Gold held professorships in neuroscience, psychiatry, anesthesiology, community health, and family medicine. He became chair of the Department of Psychiatry in 2009, founded the Division of Addiction Medicine, and established the Florida Recovery Center. His research at the UF McKnight Brain Institute explored topics including methamphetamine neurotoxicity, second-hand tobacco smoke, self-administration of sugar and drugs, and opioid- and fentanyl-induced anhedonia.

In 2011, Gold was named a University of Florida Distinguished Alumni Professor and served a second term. He retired from full-time academia in 2014 but continues teaching and research as an Emeritus Eminent Scholar at the University of Florida and as a clinical professor at Tulane University and Washington University School of Medicine. He has also served on the National Council for the Washington University School of Medicine Public Health Institute and as a professor at the University of Southern California.

== Research contributions and academic work ==
Gold's research has used laboratory models to study addiction mechanisms associated with drugs, food, and other behaviors, contributing to new treatment methods. His research demonstrated clonidine's effectiveness for opioid withdrawal, marking one of the earliest applications of a non-opioid medication for withdrawal symptoms. He co-authored the dopamine depletion hypothesis for cocaine addiction, offering insights into cocaine's addictive properties.

Gold and colleagues studied how different routes of administration affect cocaine's effects, safety, and misuse potential. His work included studies with Dr. Robert Byck on cocaine pharmacokinetics and documented early patterns of crack use, cocaine-opioid combinations, and other behaviors. In 1983, Gold co-founded a national drug helpline, later expanding its scope in collaboration with the National Institute on Drug Abuse (NIDA) to include support for cocaine and heroin addiction.

Gold has researched food-related addictive behaviors and co-edited Food and Addiction (2012), examining overeating through an addiction model. He co-chaired the Yale Conference on Food Addiction in 2007.

Other research topics include second-hand tobacco and cannabis smoke, methamphetamine's effects, physician addiction outcomes, behavioral addictions, exercise in neurodegenerative recovery, and treatment-resistant opioid use disorder. Recently, Gold has investigated the risks associated with adulterated illicit drugs and advocated for preventive education in response to the overdose crisis. He has edited special issues on addiction medicine in the Journal of the Neurological Sciences and Psychedelic & Interventional Psychiatry.

== Honors and recognitions ==
Gold was the chief scientist for the "Afghanistan National Urban Drug Use Survey," conducted by the U.S. State Department and the Bureau of International Narcotics and Law Enforcement Affairs, which studied opium exposure among children in urban Afghanistan. Working with Herbert D. Kleber, Deputy Director for Demand Reduction at the White House Office of National Drug Control Policy, he helped develop prevention and treatment programs that incorporated medication in addiction treatment. He has also collaborated with DARE, the Partnership for a Drug-Free America, and the Center on Addiction and Substance Abuse. Gold served on the board of the Betty Ford Center Foundation, focusing on drug use and youth, and was a founding director of the DEA Museum.

Gold's awards include the Addiction Policy Forum Pillar of Excellence Award, the John P. McGovern Award for contributions to public policy and addiction treatment, the National Association Addiction Treatment and Policy Lifetime Achievement Award, and an International Scientist Award from the Chinese National Academy of Sciences. He is a member of Alpha Omega Alpha, the national medical honor society. At the University of Florida, he was recognized as a Donald Dizney Eminent Scholar and University Distinguished Professor, and the White Coat Ceremony at UF College of Medicine was named in his honor. He has received multiple Inventor Awards from UF's Office of Technology Transfer, the UF College of Medicine (COM) Wall of Fame, as well as Exemplary Teaching and Minority Mentoring Awards from the College of Medicine. While a full-time professor, Gold was awarded patents for developing systems to improve patient medication compliance and outcomes, new approaches for overeating treatments, and a detector to identify second-hand tobacco smoke.

Gold was a founding director of Viewray, specializing in MR-guided radiotherapy for oncology, and AxoGen, which develops technologies for peripheral nerve repair. He continues to present research on opioid and cocaine addiction, overdose prevention, and behavioral addictions. Gold serves as Co-Editor of the Encyclopedia of Neurological Sciences and Conn's Therapy sections on addiction and regularly reviews for Current Addiction Reports and Frontiers in Public Health.

He frequently lectures at academic institutions and conferences on addiction topics and has edited recent special issues on addiction medicine and psychedelics in the Journal of the Neurological Sciences. Gold also contributes to public education on addiction through his work on Psychology Today's blog Addiction Outlook, where he advocates for evidence-based treatment, improved access to care, and recognition of addiction as a chronic condition.
