= LauraMaery Gold =

American author and licensed marriage and family therapist (born 1959)

- Gold organizing volunteer event at Washington State Capitol
- Born: 1959; Seattle, Washington, U.S.
- Education: Brigham Young University (B.S.); Northcentral University (MA-MFT); University of Wolverhampton (School of Law, D.HEd.); University of Missouri (Graduate School of Journalism); Regent University (Ph.D., Counseling Psychology)
- Occupations: Author, therapist, public speaker, director
- Writing career
- Language: English
- Genres: non-fiction; Self-help
- Notable works: Skripts Model; AiKi Relationship Training (series); Homeschool Your Child for Free; JK Lasser's Invest Online
- Website: skripts.org therelationship.institute

LauraMaery Gold (born 1959) is an American author and licensed marriage and family therapist noted for her numerous published works on subjects related to family functioning. She is the founder and director of The Relationship Institute, an organization devoted to educating couples and families in building emotional intimacy. She has been widely published in such diverse fields as marital communications, childhood education, personal technology, religion, and family financial planning. Several of her books have been translated into multiple languages. She has been a guest on a variety of national and local radio and television programs.

== Early life ==
LauraMaery Gold was born in Seattle and attended Brigham Young University, where she studied family counseling and financial planning, and attended the University of Missouri graduate school of journalism. She also earned post-graduate degrees and certifications in law, personal finance, and marriage and family therapy from British and American universities. She earned her doctorate in counseling psychology from Regent University, writing her Ph.D. dissertation on the formation and use of principle-based dyadic communication 'Skripts'.

== Career ==
LauraMaery Gold has had an extensive career as both an author and a therapist.

=== Journalism ===
She began her writing career in high school as columnist at the Kent (Washington) News Journal. During college she was the religion editor and business editor at the Provo, Utah Daily Herald. She was a freelance writer for the China Economic News, and was a bureau chief and editor for various tech publications throughout Asia. She was editor in chief of several Asian editions of PC World, Computerworld, and MacWorld magazines.

Her first published book, The Complete Idiot's Guide to Excel (co-written with Dan Post), was published in 1995. Since that time, she's authored more than a dozen books on family and consumer topics.

=== Counseling ===
Her therapeutic work began in the mid 1980s with clients seeking financial counseling through a university counseling center. She later advised low-income clients through the Community Action Agency, mediated business disputes with the Better Business Bureau, and advised delegates to various youth programs administered through the YMCA in Utah and the Pacific Northwest. She did extensive volunteer work with various not-for-profit organizations, including the Recovery Help Line of the Seattle Crisis Clinic.

She later entered private practice with Allied Family Therapy, a marriage and family counseling clinic based in Renton, Washington. In 2015 she became director of The Relationship Institute, an organization that uses a martial arts metaphor to teach better communication to couples, groups, and corporate and organizational clients.

== Personal life ==
LauraMaery Gold and her husband Dan Post are the parents of two daughters and five sons, and presently reside outside of Paris, France.

== Bibliography ==
- 2014 The Vegan Family Cookbook Aristotle Press. ISBN 0307451631
- 2009 Homeschool Your Child for Free: More Than 1,400 Smart, Effective, and Practical Resources for Educating Your Family at Home (2nd Edition). Three Rivers Press. ISBN 0307451631
- 2004 Boot Your Broker Que Publishing. ISBN 0789712318
- 2002 Homeschooling Step-by-Step: 100 Simple Solutions to Homeschooling Toughest Problems. Prima Publishing. ISBN 0761535888
- 2001 Homeschool Your Child for Free: More Than 1,200 Smart, Effective, and Practical Resources for Home Education on the Internet and Beyond. Prima Publishing. ISBN 0761525130
- 2001 Mormons on the Internet (2nd Edition). Prima Publishing. ISBN 0761515682
- 2000 J.K. Lasser's Invest Online (2nd Edition). Wiley and Sons. ISBN 0028623983
- 1997 Mormons on the Internet. Prima Publishing. ISBN 0761511482
- 1997 Jk Lassers Invest Online: Do-It-Yourself and Keep More of What You Earn. Wiley and Sons. ISBN 0028623983
- 1995 The Complete Idiot's Guide to Excel. Alpha. ISBN 1567616046
