= Adam Gold =

Adam Gold(e) may refer to:

- Adam Golde, politician
- Adam Gold (radio presenter) on WPTK
- Adam Gold (musician); see The Mendoza Line (band)
