= Dave R. Gould =

Canadian sound-art percussionist (born 1969)

- Born: 1 September 1969 (age 57)
- Origin: Hamilton, Ontario, Canada
- Genre: Sound art
- Occupations: Musician; music teacher
- Instruments: Drums; percussion; vocals
- Years active: 2000s–present
- Award: Hamilton Arts Award for Performance (2013)

Dave R. Gould (born 1 September 1969) is a Canadian musician and professional percussionist who lives in Hamilton, Ontario. Gould is a found-sound artist who creates instruments from unique and household items. These instruments include the toilet, the washboard, and moose and caribou antlers, among others. The bone section of his self-created instruments was recently featured in Hamilton's Anne Foster Windows.

Gould has recorded on several albums, including three solo albums: The Passion of Bobby Bedeque (2005), ADAD (2011) and Truck for Sale (2011).

In addition to drumming and singing in live shows, Gould also teaches music to and performs for children and hosts an open mic and jam weekly at Corktown Pub in Hamilton, Ontario.

Gould received the Hamilton Arts Award for Performance in 2013.

== Discography ==
=== Solo ===
- The Passion of Bobby Bedeque (2005)
- ADAD (2011)
- Truck for Sale (2011)
