= Phil Wynn Owen =

Philip Wynn Owen, CB (born 1960) was a Member of the European Court of Auditors from January 2014 to January 2020. He was previously a British civil servant from 1981 to 2013.

== Education and early career ==
Born in 1960, Wynn Owen joined HM Civil Service in 1981 after graduating from University College, Oxford, with a history degree (BA, MA). He spent eighteen years at HM Treasury, including two spells in private office – as Assistant Private Secretary to the Chancellor (1984-86), and as Principal Private Secretary to the Permanent Secretary to the Treasury (1991-93).

Between 1988 and 1990, Wynn Owen also completed a Master of Business Administration (MBA) degree at London Business School; and in 2008 attended the Advanced Management Programme at Harvard Business School.

== Senior civil servant ==
After 1993, Wynn Owen successively led the Transport, Tax and Budget, and Tax Policy teams of the HM Treasury before moving to the Cabinet Office in 1999 where he was Director of the Regulatory Impact Unit until 2003.

After a posting back at the HM Treasury, in 2003-04, as Director for the Financial Sector, Wynn Owen was appointed Director-General for Strategy and Pensions at the Department for Work and Pensions in 2004, succeeding Paul Gray who had been Head of the Pensions Client Group. As part of the government's plans to reform the state pension system to encourage people to save for private pensions, Wynn Owen oversaw efforts to "increase the basic pension and cut means-tested pension benefits, [and create] personal accounts". He was responsible for the creation of a non-political quango to run the National Pension Savings Scheme, and for the organization of a National Pensions Day.

In 2009, he moved to the Department of Energy and Climate Change as Director-General for National Climate Change and Consumer Support; in 2011, he was appointed Director-General for International Climate Change and Energy Efficiency. The Daily Telegraph described him as the "official in charge of 'greening' Britain's economy". He left the department in 2013, having also served as the acting Permanent Secretary between Moira Wallace's departure in October 2012 and Stephen Lovegrove's appointment in January 2013.

Wynn Owen was also Deputy Chair and Non-Executive Director of Maidstone and Tunbridge Wells NHS Trust from 2008-13.

== European Court of Auditors ==
At the start of 2014, Wynn Owen became a Member of the European Court of Auditors (ECA), to serve a 6-year term. Wynn Owen served for two years in Chamber II of the ECA, auditing EU Cohesion policy (2014-16). In 2016, he moved to Chamber I, where, as Dean for two years (2016-18), he led an expansion of its audit work on “Sustainable Use of Natural Resources”. He was responsible of a wide range of publications:

• Using new imaging technologies to monitor the Common Agricultural Policy: steady progress overall, but slower for climate and environment monitoring - ECA Special Report 04/2020

• EU action on Ecodesign and Energy Labelling: important contribution to greater energy efficiency reduced by significant delays and non-compliance - ECA Special Report 01/2020

• EU support for energy storage – Review 4/2019

• Combatting desertification in the EU: a growing threat in need of more action - ECA Special Report 33/2018

• Floods Directive: progress in assessing risks, while planning and implementation need to improve - ECA Special Report 25/2018

• EU Action on energy and climate change - ECA Landscape Review 2017

• Spending at least one euro in every five from the EU budget on climate action: ambitious work underway, but at serious risk of falling short - ECA Special Report 31/2016

• EU nuclear decommissioning assistance programmes in Lithuania, Bulgaria and Slovakia: some progress made since 2011, but critical challenges ahead - ECA Special Report 22/2016

• Improving the security of energy supply by developing the internal energy market: more efforts needed - ECA Special Report 16/2015

• Efforts to address problems with public procurement in EU cohesion expenditure should be intensified - ECA Special Report 10/2015

• Is the ERDF effective in funding projects that directly promote biodiversity under the EU biodiversity strategy to 2020? - ECA Special Report 12/2014

== Honours and awards ==
In 2008, Wynn Owen was appointed a Companion of the Order of the Bath (CB).

== Personal life ==
Wynn Owen married Elizabeth (Liz) Mary Fahey in 1989. They have three sons.

Other offices
Preceded by Paul Gray (as Head of Pensions Client Group)	Director-General, Strategy and Pensions; Department for Work and Pensions; November 2004–June 2009	Succeeded by Richard Heaton (Alan Woods acted in the interim)
