= The Australian Communist =

The Australian Communist was a weekly newspaper published from Sydney, Australia between 24 December 1920 and 29 April 1921. The newspaper was the official organ of the Communist Party of Australia. In total, 19 issues of The Australian Communist were published. Tom Glynn served as the editor of The Australian Communist until 25 March 1921. For the last issues C.W. Baker served as the editor.

== The Communist ==
The newspaper changed its title to The Communist. It continued publishing under the new title from 1921 to 1923 to be replaced by Workers' Weekly that became the official organ of the Australian Communist Party.

== Workers' Weekly ==
The Communist folded in 1923 to be replaced by Worker' Weekly which became the official organ of the party from 1923 to 1939. Workers' Weekly stopped publication with Tribune becoming the official organ starting 1939.

== Publication history ==
Publication	Commenced publication	Ceased publication
The International Socialist	1910	1920
The Australian Communist	1920	1921
The Communist	1921	1923
Workers' Weekly	1923	1939
Tribune	1939	1991

== See also ==
- Tribune (Australian newspaper)
