= Todd Gould =

American psychiatrist and academic

Todd Denton Gould is an American psychiatrist and associate professor of psychiatry at the University of Maryland School of Medicine. He earned his MD from the University of Virginia, after which he completed a research fellowship at the National Institute of Mental Health's Laboratory of Molecular Pathophysiology and Experimental Therapeutics. His research has shed light on the pharmacological mechanism by which ketamine-related drugs are able to treat depression in mice.
