= Justice Gould =

Justice Gould may refer to:

- Andrew Gould (judge) (born 1963), associate justice of the Arizona Supreme Court
- Ashley Mulgrave Gould (1859–1921), associate justice of the Supreme Court of the District of Columbia
- James Gould (jurist) (1770–1838), associate justice of the Connecticut Supreme Court
- Robert S. Gould (1826–1904), associate justice and chief justice of the Texas Supreme Court
- Steven B. Gould (born 1966), justice of the Maryland Supreme Court

== See also ==
- Ronald M. Gould (born 1946), judge of the United States Court of Appeals for the Ninth Circuit
