= Victor Gold (chemist) =

British chemist (1922–1985)

Victor Gold FRS FRSC (29 June 1922 – 29 September 1985) was a chemist who served on the faculty of King's College, London.

Gold was born in Vienna, the son of lawyer Oscar Gold and his first wife, the former Emmy Kopperl. He was raised primarily by his mother. Gold arrived in England, at Croydon aerodrome, in the spring of 1938, aged 15. His entry to the UK had been arranged by his uncle Max Gold (father of Thomas Gold, FRS). He was sent, with a cousin, to Loughborough College to learn English and work in the engineering workshops (probably with Herbert Schofield).

By the autumn of 1939, Gold had gained a place at University College (transferred to King's and Bristol, because of the war) to study chemistry, but the following summer all Austrian and German aliens were interned, mostly in Douglas, Isle of Man. In the camp Gold met Hans Pelzer, one of the founders of transition state theory, who taught Victor some quantum mechanics.

Gold was released from internment in December 1940, and joined UCL, now in Aberystwyth; Bristol was out of bounds for him. After a poor start he gained a first-class honours degree, largely thanks to the encouragement of Sir Christopher Ingold. In 1944, Gold was appointed Demonstrator at King's, now back in the Strand. He remained at King's for the rest of his life. Milestones along the way were:

- 1946 — Assistant Lecturer
- 1947 — Lecturer
- 1956 — Reader in Physical Organic Chemistry
- 1964 — Professor of Chemistry
- 1971 — Head of Department
- 1975 — Fellowship of King's College
- 1978 — Dean of the Faculty of Natural Science

Gold's specialty was physical organic chemistry. His research focused on the kinetics of organic chemical reactions. He established the Advances in Physical Organic Chemistry publication series in 1963 and edited it for many years.

He initiated the development of the IUPAC Compendium of Chemical Terminology, which is published with a gold-colored cover and is known as the "Gold Book" in recognition of his work as its first author and compiler.

Gold was elected a Fellow of the Royal Society in 1972.

Ten years after his appointment at King's, Gold married Jean Sandiford, who had read chemistry at King's. They had two children: Elizabeth Helen in 1957, and Martin in 1959. Victor Gold, whose home was in South Croydon, died on 29 September 1985.

== Publication ==
- pH Measurements: Their Theory and Practice, Metheun & Co., London, 1956.
