= Henry Gold =

Henry Gold (born c. 1934) is an Australian photographer and environmental activist.

Gold emigrated to Australia from his native Austria in 1955, joined a hiking society (the Sydney Bush Walkers Club) and took up wilderness photography. His interest in landscape photography led him to travel to America, where he studied the work of photographers such as Ansel Adams. In the 1960s, his work was used in a campaign to protect the Colong Caves in New South Wales, and from this point onwards Gold's work began to receive wider attention.

He was awarded the Medal of the Order of Australia in 2006 for "service to wilderness preservation through the use of photographic documentation".
