= David Gold, Baron Gold =

British lawyer (born 1951)

The Right Honourable The Lord Gold
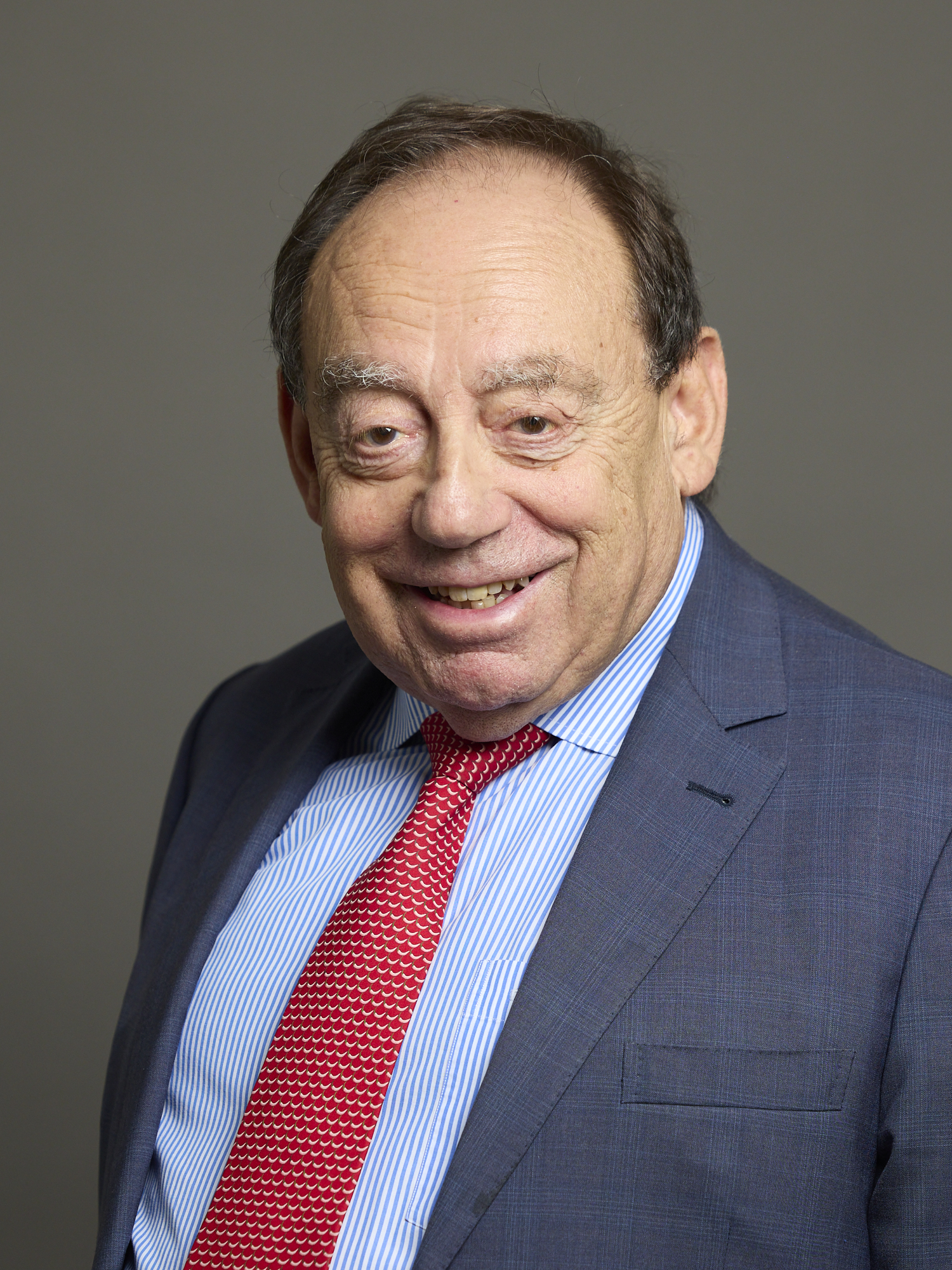
- Official portrait, 2025

Member of the House of Lords
- Lord Temporal
- Life peerage 1 February 2011

Personal details
- Born: 1 March 1951 (age 75)
- Party: Conservative

David Laurence Gold, Baron Gold (born 1 March 1951) is a British lawyer and Conservative life peer in the House of Lords.

In March 2011 he set up David Gold & Associates high level strategic litigation advisors. He was senior litigation partner at Herbert Smith LLP, an international law firm headquartered in London.

On 19 November 2010, it was announced that Gold would be created a life peer. He was created Baron Gold, of Westcliff-on-Sea in the County of Essex on 1 February 2011.

In January 2013 Rolls-Royce announced that it had retained the services of Lord Gold to review their global anti-corruption compliance policies following bribery allegations in China and Indonesia.

In April 2015, Lord Gold became an adviser to Balance Legal Capital LLP, a leading provider of litigation finance based in London.

== Arms ==
Coat of arms of David Gold, Baron Gold
Crest A mallard drake Proper resting its dexter foot on a bezant. Escutcheon Gules a bend barry wavy Azure and Argent between in sinister chief scales of justice and in dexter base a menorah Or. Supporters Dexter a lion guardant sinister a beaver guardant both Or.

Orders of precedence in the United Kingdom
Preceded by The Lord Glendonbrook	Gentlemen; Baron Gold	Followed by The Lord Storey
