= Harry Gould (editor) =

Australian communist and newspaper editor

Llewellyn Harry Gould (died 1974), generally known as Harry Gould, was a prominent Australian communist, best known as editor of the Tribune, the official organ of the Communist Party of Australia (CPA).

== History ==
Gould, who may have been of Jewish descent, was educated at Dublin University.

He joined the Communist Party in 1934. By 1937 he was in Sydney working as a Workers' Educational Association (WEA) lecturer.

Gould was editor of the Workers' Weekly and its successor Tribune.

In July 1941 Gould was jailed for 40 days on the basis of WEA material found on a table at the Bondi School of Arts.

He was appointed manager of Forward which acknowledged its communist affiliation in 1942, when it became a partial replacement for the (banned) Tribune.

In preparation for the CPA being declared illegal, he bought a printing press, which was brought into operation as Tribune's press in 1942.

He was jailed for three months for membership of the CPA, and despite increasing disillusionment with the party in Moscow, retained his membership to the end. He began writing a book about his disappointment, but was killed in a car accident before it was completed.

== Publications ==
- Gould, Llewellyn Harry; William A. Wood (1942). How Russia smashed its fifth column. Sydney: Current Book Distributors..
- A Marxist Glossary (various editions, 1943–1967)
- The Sharkey Writings (c. 1974)
- Art, Science & Communism (1946)

== Family ==
Gould married Diana Maud Reeve in Sydney in 1937. She was a prominent communist, and a regular speaker at "Speakers' Corner" in Sydney's Domain. She remained a member and regular contributor until at least 1990. The Tribune ceased publication on 3 April 1991.
