= Anthony Gould (cricketer) =

English cricketer (born 1944)

Personal information
- Full name: Anthony Victor Endersby Gould
- Born: 22 February 1944 (age 82); Windsor, Berkshire, England
- Batting: Right-handed
- Bowling: Right-arm off break

Domestic team information
- Years: Team
- 1964–1966: Cambridge University

Career statistics
Competition	First-class
Matches	13
Runs scored	241
Batting average	10.04
100s/50s	–/–
Top score	38
Balls bowled	32
Wickets	1
Bowling average	16.00
5 wickets in innings	–
10 wickets in match	–
Best bowling	1/10
Catches/stumpings	3/–
- Source: Cricinfo, 14 January 2022

Anthony Victor Endersby Gould (born 22 February 1944) is an English former first-class cricketer.

Gould was born at Windsor in February 1944 and later studied at Fitzwilliam College, Cambridge. While studying at Cambridge, he played first-class cricket for Cambridge University Cricket Club between 1964 and 1966, making 13 appearances, with 12 of his appearances coming in 1966. Playing as a middle order batsman in the Cambridge side, he scored 241 runs at an average of 10.04, with a highest score of 38.
