= Alan Gold (author) =

Australian writer (1945–2024)

- Born: 13 August 1945; Leicester, England
- Died: June 2024 (aged 78); Katoomba, New South Wales, Australia
- Writing career
- Language: English
- Years active: 1975–2024
- Genre: Historical fiction

Alan David Gold (13 August 1945 – June 2024) was an Australian novelist, columnist and human rights activist.

== Life and career ==
Born in Leicester, United Kingdom, Alan Gold began his working life on British provincial newspapers such as the Leicester Mercury before becoming a freelance correspondent in the United Kingdom and Europe. He and his wife Eva moved to Australia in 1970.

He wrote more than thirty books which were published and translated internationally. His novels dealt with a wide range of subjects, most often associated with modern and ancient history and politics and Judaism.

He was a regular literary critic for The Australian and also an opinion columnist for The Spectator Australia. In June 2000, he was the New South Wales Human Rights Orator, as well as the B'nai B'rith Human Rights Orator in Sydney and Melbourne. He was a visiting guest lecturer in literature at major Australian universities and a regular lecturer and speaker on matters of literature, racism and human rights.

He was a past President of the Anti-Defamation Unit of B'nai B'rith, was a member of think tanks the Sydney Institute and the Centre for Independent Studies, and a board member of the international writers' centre, Varuna, the Vice President of the human rights program Courage to Care, and the literary co-ordinator of the New South Wales University Shalom College's Festival, Limmud Oz. He was a visiting scholar to the Melbourne Limmud Oz.

He was married with three children and lived in Sydney, New South Wales.

Gold died after a long illness in June 2024. His funeral was held at Rookwood Cemetery on 19 June 2024.

== Bibliography ==
=== Books ===
Year	Title	Imprint	ISBN
1975	The Pregnant Father (illustrated by Graham Austin)	Fontana	ISBN 0006341470
1992	Marketing for Small Business	Allen & Unwin	ISBN 1863730915
1993	The Jericho Files	HarperCollins	ISBN 0732249945
1994	The Lost Testament	HarperCollins	ISBN 0732250773
1995	The Final Candidate	HarperCollins	ISBN 0732251788
1998	The Marmara Contract	HarperCollins	ISBN 0732259916
1998	The Gift of Evil	HarperCollins	ISBN 0732256534
1999	Minyan	HarperCollins	ISBN 0732264006
1999	Berlin Song	HarperCollins	ISBN 0732265851
2001	Jezebel	HarperCollins	ISBN 073226829X
2003	The Pirate Queen	HarperCollins	ISBN 0732268281
2005	Warrior Queen: The Story of Boudica, Celtic Queen	New American Library	ISBN 0451215257
2006	El Imperio de la Reina	Via Magna (Spain)	ISBN 8493467960
2013	Bloodline	Simon & Schuster	ISBN 9781922052834
2014	Stateless	Simon & Schuster	ISBN 9781922052889
2014	Bell of the Desert	Yucca Publishing	ISBN 9781631580079
2015	Birthright	Atria Publishing Group	ISBN 9781476759869
2015	Bat Out of Hell	Yucca Publishing	ISBN 9781631580628
2016	The Mechanic	Yucca Publishing	ISBN 9781631580857
2016	Redemption: Three Thousand Years of Rulers, Religion, Power, Politics, Corruption, and a City Named Jerusalem	CreateSpace	ISBN 9781537145525
2018	The Pretender's Lady	Skyhorse Publishing	ISBN 1510732829
2020	The Book of Mary	GWPublishers	ISBN 0648710254

=== Essays and columns ===
- Gold, Alan (4 January 2014). "Diary". The Spectator Australia. 324 (9671): v.
- Gold, Alan. "Growing internet dependence sapping our life skills". The Australian.
