= Ari Gold =

Ari Gold may refer to:

- Ari Gold (filmmaker) (born 1970), American filmmaker, actor, and musician
- Ari Gold (musician) (1974–2021), American singer, and the title of his 2001 album
- Ari Gold (Entourage), a fictional character in the HBO comedy Entourage

== See also ==
- Ari L. Goldman (born 1949), Professor of Journalism at Columbia University and former reporter for The New York Times
- Ari Goldwag (born 1979), Jewish recording artist
