= Joseph Gold (lawyer) =

English lawyer

Sir Joseph Gold (July 12, 1912 – February 22, 2000) was an English lawyer who served as general counsel and director of the legal department of the International Monetary Fund since its inception for many years.

== Background ==
Gold was born on July 12, 1912, in London, United Kingdom. He received undergraduate and law degrees from the University of London and an SJD from Harvard University.

== Career ==
Early in his career, Gold served as legal adviser to the British Merchant Shipping Mission and secretary to the British Seaman's Welfare Board.

In 1946, Gold joined the International Monetary Fund (or IMF, established by the Bretton Woods Conference of 1944). In 1949, he became IMF assistant general counsel. In 1960, he became the IMF's general counsel and director of its legal department. He retired in 1979 but continue to consult to the IMF until 1999.

Gold was well acquainted with many IMF, World Bank, and economics colleagues who came under accusation for Communist associations, including: Harry Dexter White, George Eddy, and Paul Samuelson.

During his retirement, he lectured in law at Southern Methodist University, the University of Michigan, Columbia Law School, and Creighton University. He gave guest lectures in Europe and in Beijing.

== Awards ==
In 1980, he was awarded a knighthood by Queen Elizabeth II, entitling him to the style of Sir Joseph Gold.

== Personal life and death ==
In 1940, Gold married Ruth Schechter; they had three children.

Gold died age 87 on February 22, 2000, in Bethesda, Maryland, United States.

== Works ==
Gold published numerous articles and books on international law, especially relating to the IMF. He has been called "a leading authority on international monetary law" and a "key legal architect of the IMF's development in the post-World War II period".

== Legacy ==
In 1999, Gold gave a collection of works by Samuel Beckett to the University of Delaware.
