= Tom Gold (rally driver) =

Former driver

- Nationality: English
- Born: Thomas Anderson Gold; 1932; Stoke-on-Trent
- Died: 2014; Rhosneigr North Wales

Thomas A. Gold was an English rally driver.

== Career ==
He has finished on the podium a couple of times in the RAC Rally; third in 1958 driving a Standard Pennant and second in 1959 driving an Austin Healey Sprite. Driving the same car, he also finished eighth on the 13th Tulip Rally in 1961.
