= Charles Gold (British Army officer) =

Royal Artillery officer and painter (1768–1842)

- Born: 1 November 1768; Ireland
- Died: 17 April 1842 (aged 73); Leamington Spa, Warwickshire, England
- Spouse: Anne Kilvington
- Military career
- Allegiance: British Army
- Branch: Royal Artillery
- Rank: Lieutenant Colonel
- Unit: 2nd Division
- Conflicts: Battle of Waterloo

Lieutenant Colonel Charles Gold (1 November 1768 – 17 April 1842) was a British military officer painter.

He was born in Ireland on 1 November 1768 He was a passionate painter, his sketches depict the people of the Coromandel coast and Mysore and sites including Tipu Sultan's palace and tomb.

Gold had served in India between 1791 and 1798, where he sketched scenes that later became his published aquatints. He served in the West Indies from 1803.

During the advance of the 2nd Division in the afternoon a French howitzer shell penetrated an ammunition wagon of Charles' command and exploded its cargo. Few men were hurt, but the horses were horribly mutilated and galloped madly about the field. Later, in a last-ditch attempt to beat the British before turning onto the Prussians, Napoleon sent in his Imperial Guard which advanced upon the British centre. Several regiments of the Imperial Guard Cavalry attacked the 2nd Division. Charles' guns turned on the Old Guard as it advanced up the ridge, but the Old Guard, even though rocked, stood their ground until the Duke gave the order; "Put every gun to them Sir". The Middle Guard was stopped, and began to retreat which ended up as a rout, spreading throughout the French Army as the Old Guard was completely destroyed to a man where they stood.Charles survived the battle and was mentioned in despatches.

He was made a CB.

He was the father of three sons (who all served in army) and two daughters. He was the father of the renowned army officer Charles Emilius Gold. Charles retired his commission in December 1827 due to bad health. He retired to Leamington Spa, Warwickshire, where he lived until his death in 1842.
