= Victor J. Gold =

American lawyer

Dean of Loyola Law School
- In office 2008–2015
- Preceded by: David W. Burcham
- Succeeded by: Paul T. Hayden

Personal details
- Born: Victor James Gold; October 17, 1950 (age 75) Los Angeles County, California
- Education: University of California, Los Angeles (BA, JD)
- Occupation: law professor

Victor James Gold (born October 17, 1950, in Los Angeles County, California) is an American law professor and former dean of Loyola Law School in Los Angeles, California.

== Biography ==
Gold was educated at the University of California, Los Angeles, where he received B.A. and J.D. degrees. He is the author of six books on the Federal Rules of Evidence and has written numerous articles on evidence and advocacy law. He is a member of the American Law Institute and the author of bar exam questions on contracts, remedies and evidence in California and Arizona.

From 1975 to 1980 he was an associate attorney with Nossaman LLP in Los Angeles, California. The firm offered him a partnership in 1981 but he declined to pursue a teaching career.

From 1980 to 1984 he was an associate professor of law and later professor of law at the Arizona State University. In 1992 he was a visiting fellow at Wolfson College, Cambridge University in England. From 2000 to 2005 he served as Associate Dean of Loyola Law School for Academic Affairs. From 2008 to 2015 he served as Dean of Loyola Law School and Senior Vice President of Loyola Marymount University.

He has since served as a dean emeritus and William H. Hannon Professor of Law at Loyola Law School. He has taught at Loyola since 1984.

He has served as a legal analyst for CBS News and provided legal commentary to The New York Times, Los Angeles Times, ABC News, NBC News, CNN and other outlets.
