= Charles Emilius Gold =

British Army officer and artist (1809–1871)

- Born: 6 January 1809; Woolwich, Kent, England
- Died: 29 July 1871 (aged 62); Dover, Kent, England
- Spouse: Eleanor Felicia Askin Geddes (m. 1839)
- Military career
- Allegiance: United Kingdom
- Branch: British Army
- Service years: 1828–1860
- Rank: Lieutenant-General
- Unit: 65th (2nd Yorkshire, North Riding) Regiment of Foot
- Commands: British Forces in New Zealand (1858–1860)
- Conflicts: First Taranaki War: Battle of Waireka; Battle of Puketakauere

Charles Emilius Gold (6 January 1809 – 29 July 1871) was a British Army officer of the 65th Regiment of Foot who served as Commander of the British forces during the First Taranaki War. He was also a prolific landscape painter whose watercolours provide an important historical record of nineteenth-century New Zealand.

== Early life and military career ==
Gold was born at Woolwich, Kent, on 6 January 1809, the son of Colonel Charles Gold, a Royal Artillery officer who served at Waterloo. He purchased an ensign's commission in the 65th Regiment of Foot on 28 March 1828. Gold served with the regiment in British Guiana, Barbados, and Canada before returning to England.

In 1846, the 65th Regiment was ordered to New Zealand. Gold arrived in Auckland in January 1847 and took command of the regimental detachment stationed in Wellington in August 1847, holding the rank of lieutenant-colonel. During his eleven-year stay in Wellington, Gold and his troops assisted the civilian population during local emergencies, notably following major fires and the 1855 Wairarapa earthquake. He was promoted to colonel by brevet in 1854, and in November 1858 he succeeded Colonel Robert Wynyard as commander of all British military forces in New Zealand.

== First Taranaki War ==
Following the outbreak of conflict over disputed land purchases at Waitara in early 1860, Gold assumed field command of British troops during the First Taranaki War. His leadership during the campaign was heavily criticized by settlers and the local press. At the Battle of Waireka in March 1860, Gold ordered a retreat back to New Plymouth to defend the township before colonial militia forces under Captain John Cracroft had fully disengaged, leading to accusations of abandonment. In June 1860, British forces suffered a severe defeat at the Battle of Puketakauere, where a tactical assault ordered by Gold resulted in heavy casualties against fortified Māori positions. Gold was relieved of his field command in August 1860 by Major-General Thomas Pratt. He retired from active military service on 1 October 1860 following his promotion to Major-General. He was later promoted to lieutenant-general on the retired list in 1869.

== Artwork ==
Throughout his postings in New Zealand, Gold was an enthusiastic watercolourist. Although art historians have described his artistic style as relatively simplistic, his extensive output documented native flora, Māori life, and early colonial settlements around Wellington and Auckland. His works are held in public collections including the Alexander Turnbull Library and Te Papa. Gold's paintings have served as historical documentation of geological events in nineteenth-century New Zealand. Following the 1855 Wairarapa earthquake, Gold painted a watercolour capturing a prominent landslide triggered by the seismic activity on the coastal cliffs between Wellington and the Hutt Valley. Modern geologists have noted that despite the painting's stylized appearance, Gold accurately rendered the local geological structures and rock outcrops, making the site clearly identifiable when compared to modern physical landforms.

== Gallery ==
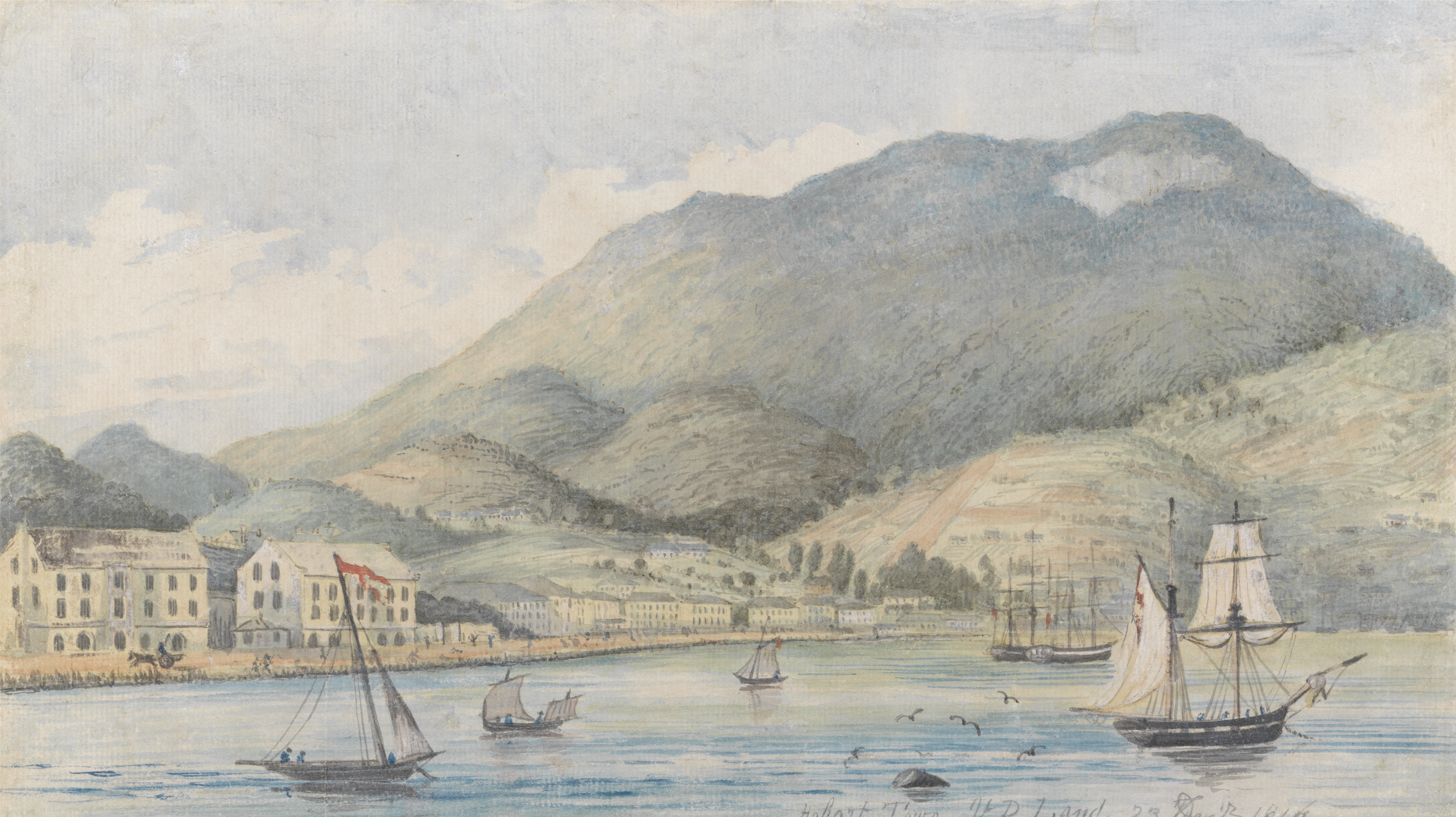
A View of Hobart, Tasmania (1846). Artist: Charles Emilius Gold

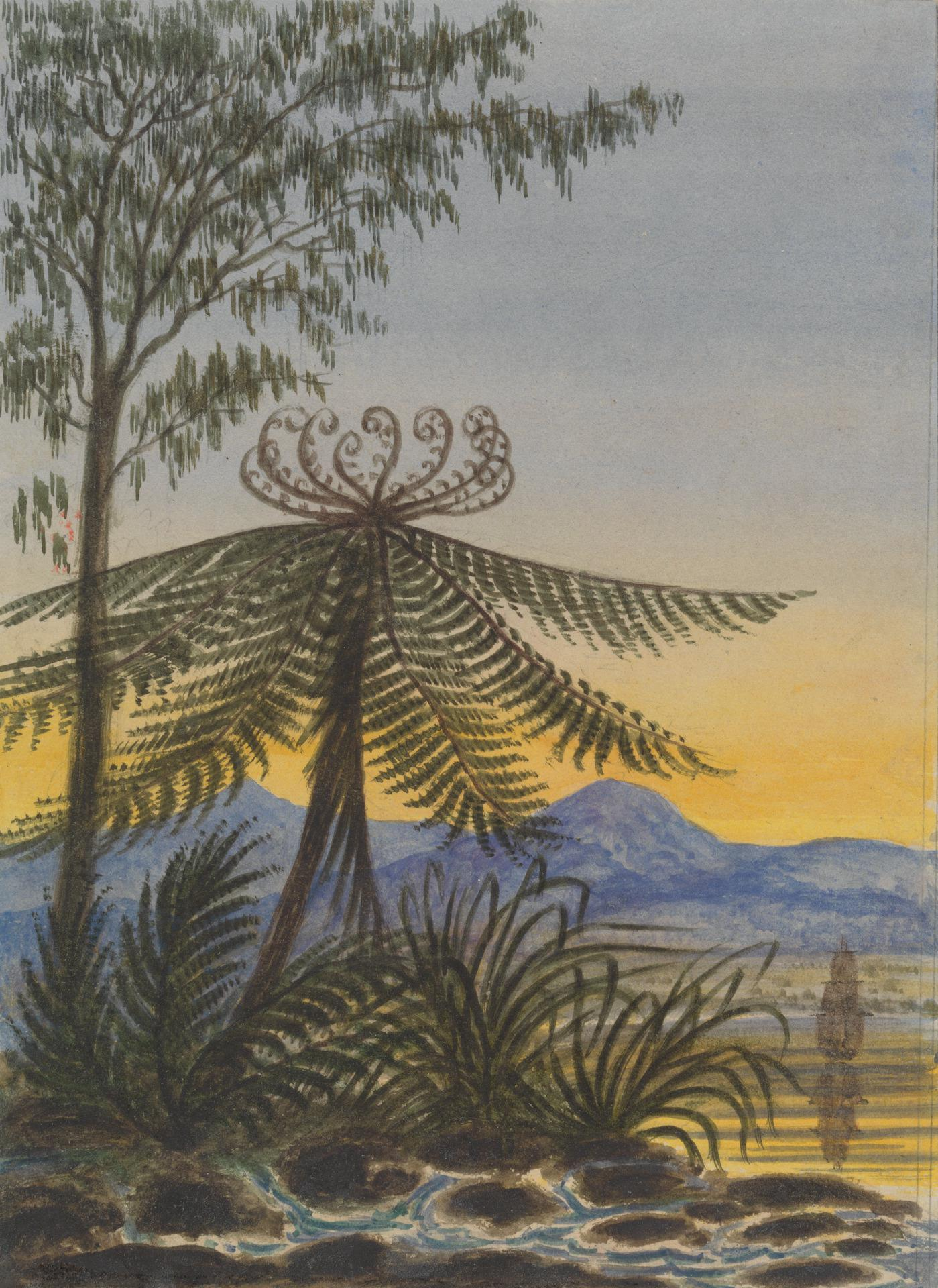
View near Auckland: Evening—Trees and Ferns (c 1849). Artist: Charles Emilius Gold

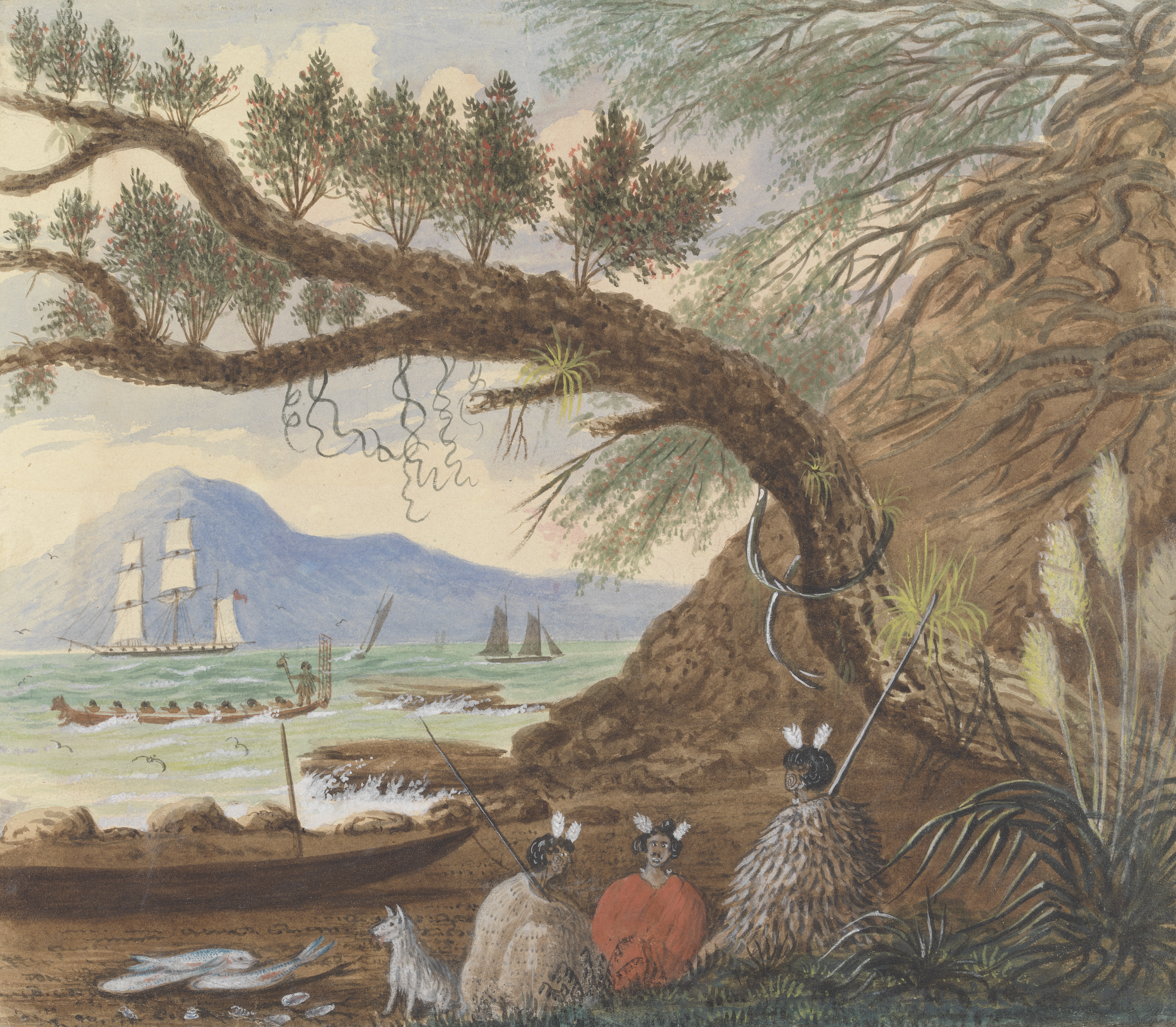
View near Auckland: Three Maoris and a Dog (1860). Artist: Charles Emilius Gold

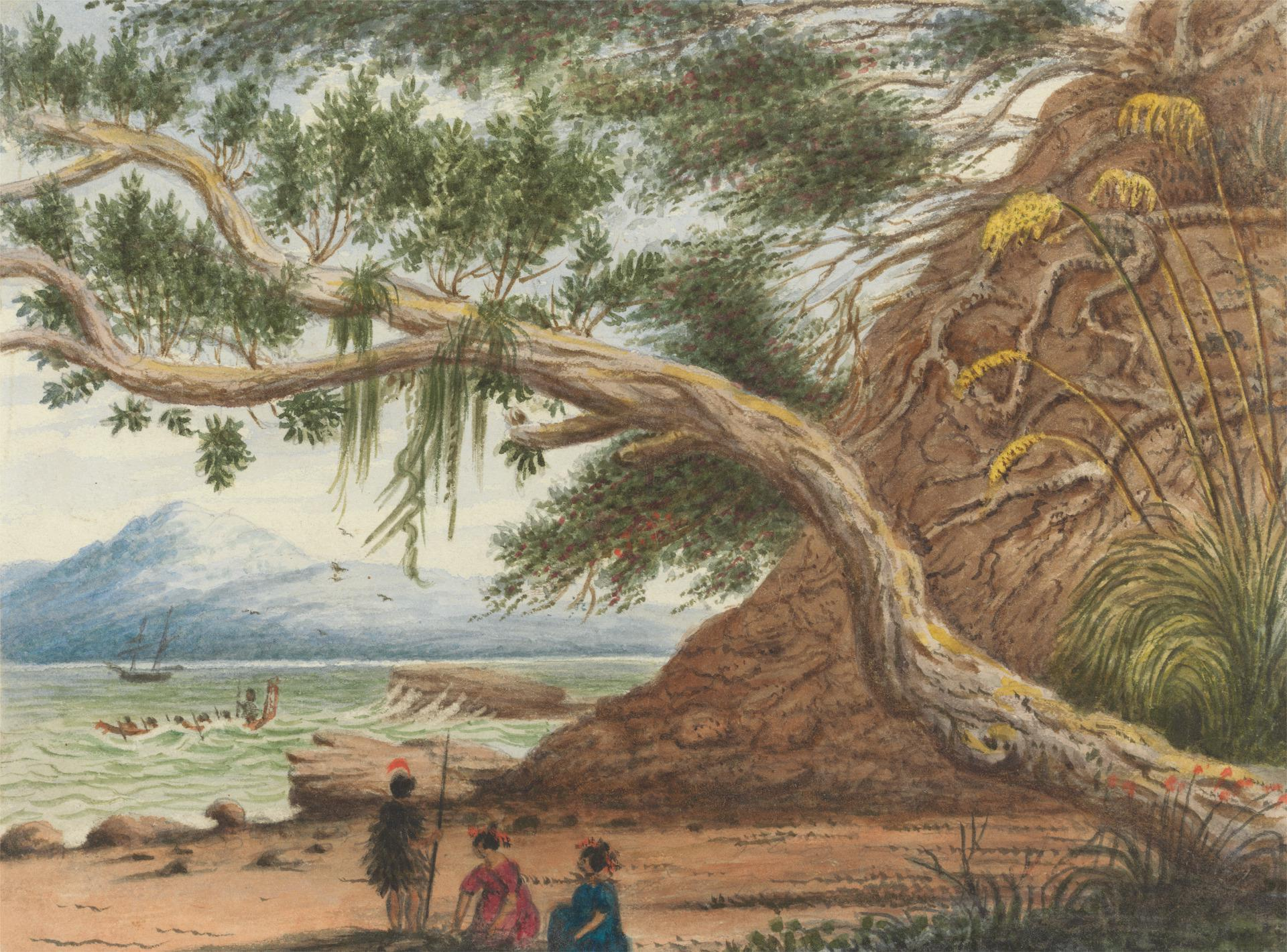
View near Auckland: Maori Warrior and Women (1860). Artist: Charles Emilius Gold

== Personal life and later years ==
On 1 June 1839, Gold married Eleanor Felicia Askin Geddes at Kingston, Upper Canada. The couple had fifteen children, several of whom died in infancy while the family was stationed in Wellington. Their son, Walter Kelvington Gold (c. 1847–1895), became a painter and served as secretary of the South Australian Society of Arts.

Facing significant debt, Gold departed New Zealand for Europe in 1861. He lived in Belgium for several years before returning to England, where he died in poverty at Dover on 29 July 1871.

== Legacy ==
Several geographical features in Charles Sound, Fiordland, were named after Gold and his family by Captain John Lort Stokes during his hydrographic survey aboard HMS Acheron. Both Emelius Arm and Gold Arm were named in his honour, while Eleanor Island—located where the sound forks into the two arms—was named after his wife, Eleanor Geddes.
