= Anti-Defamation Commission =

Jewish-Australian community organisation to combat antisemitism

The Anti-Defamation Commission (ADC) is a Jewish-Australian community organisation founded by B'nai B'rith to combat antisemitism in Australia. It was originally established as the B'nai B'rith Anti-Defamation Commission. The ADC's efforts have resulted in academic scrutiny of trends of fascism in Australia with emerging research on activists and militia movements that have promoted antisemitic views. The group is a former division of B'nai B'rith in Melbourne. Data collection on antisemitic incidents in Australia is a focus of the Anti-Defamation Commission. Aside from the ADC, the Executive Council of Australian Jewry also collects data on antisemitism in Australia.

== People ==
The chairman of the Anti-Defamation Commission is Dvir Abramovich, an Israeli-Australian academic, columnist and activist. Grahame Leonard, a former commissioner to the Victorian Multicultural Commission, is a past chairman of the organisation, and academic and filmmaker Danny Ben-Moshe is a former director.

== See also ==
- Anti-Defamation League, a similar organisation in the United States originally founded by B'nai B'rith
