= John Shaw (public servant) =

Australian engineer and public servant (1902–1983)

J. A. L. Shaw CBE, DSO

5th Commissioner for Main Roads
- In office 20 April 1962 – 25 August 1967
- Minister: Pat Hills; Pat Morton
- Preceded by: Howard Macoun Sherrard
- Succeeded by: Russell Thomas

Deputy Chief Commissioner of the City of Sydney
- In office 14 November 1967 – 26 September 1969 Serving with Vernon Treatt (Chief), William Pettingell
- Preceded by: John Armstrong (Lord Mayor)
- Succeeded by: Sir Emmet McDermott (Lord Mayor)

Personal details
- Born: 26 August 1902 Marrickville, New South Wales, Australia
- Died: 20 April 1983 (aged 80) Manly, New South Wales, Australia
- Resting place: Frenchs Forest Bushland Cemetery
- Spouse: Nellie Violet Hicks (m. 1926; died 1974)
- Children: John Shaw; David Lachlan Shaw
- Education: Sydney Technical High School
- Alma mater: University of Sydney
- Profession: Engineer and public servant

Military service
- Allegiance: Australia
- Branch/service: Citizen Military Forces (1924–40); Second Australian Imperial Force (1940–46)
- Years of service: 1924–1946
- Rank: Major
- Unit: 2/12th Field Company, Royal Australian Engineers
- Battles/wars: Second World War; Malayan campaign; Fall of Singapore
- Awards: Distinguished Service Order

John Alexander Lachlan Shaw, CBE, DSO (26 August 1902 – 20 April 1983) was an Australian civil engineer, soldier and New South Wales public servant, who served as the NSW Commissioner for Main Roads from 1962 to 1967.

== Early life and education ==
Shaw was born on 26 August 1902 in Marrickville, New South Wales, the son of John and Alice Shaw. He attended Sydney Technical High School and thereafter studied civil engineering at the University of Sydney. After graduating with honours with a Bachelor of Engineering in civil engineering in 1925, in February 1926 Shaw was recruited as an assistant engineer into the newly established Main Roads Board of New South Wales. In 1928 he was included amongst the first six divisional engineer appointments made by the Board, taking up the position of Divisional Engineer of the Lower Northern Division at Tamworth in August 1928. In May 1932, he was transferred to Newcastle to set up the divisional office of the newly-established Department of Main Roads, and then later was appointed the Metropolitan Engineer based in Sydney. Shaw became a member of the Institution of Engineers (Australia), a member of the Institute of Highway Engineers in London, and a Fellow of the Australian Planning Institute.

In 1926, Shaw married Nellie Violet Hicks in Chatswood. Their first child, John Shaw, was born at Manly on 3 April 1927. A second son, David Lachlan Shaw, was born in Newcastle on 28 October 1932.

== Military service ==
When the Second World War broke out, Shaw took a leave of absence from the department and enlisted on 8 July 1940 in the 2/12th Field Company, Royal Australian Engineers. As part of the 8th Division in the Second Australian Imperial Force, Shaw was sent over in February 1941 to Malaya to assist in the defence of Singapore. He surrendered along with all Allied forces in Malaya on 31 January 1942 and was taken prisoner, being held in Changi Prison. Liberated at the end of the war, he was discharged on 24 January 1946 with the rank of major. On 6 March 1947 for "Organisation, courage and coolness in Malaya" he was awarded the Distinguished Service Order (DSO) on the recommendation of the commander of the 8th Division, Major General Cecil Callaghan, and the Chief of the General Staff, Lieutenant General Vernon Sturdee. He was presented with his award by the Governor-General of Australia, Sir William McKell, on 24 January 1949 at Admiralty House, Sydney. His award citation reads:

During operations in Malaya in 1942, Major Shaw, the Officer Commanding 2/12 Field Company, Royal Australian Engineers, was responsible for the demolitions between Segamat and Johore Bahru, and, when on Singapore Island, for the destruction of oil stores and the wireless mast at Kranji. During the withdrawal of the 27th Australian Infantry Brigade from Gemas to Singapore he personally supervised all demolitions and remained behind with his detachments when the Infantry had withdrawn to ensure that they were successfully carried out. On most occasions this work had to be carried out under heavy fire. His organisation, courage and coolness under enemy fire were largely responsible for the great success of this work which proved very valuable on many occasions. He was at all times an inspiration and example to his men.

== Department of Main Roads ==
On returning to civilian life in Australia in March 1946, Shaw resumed his work with the Department of Main Roads as Assistant Chief Engineer, and as Chief Engineer from August 1946. In 1950 he visited the United Kingdom and North America on an official mission to study highway engineering. Rising to be Assistant Commissioner from 23 September 1953, Shaw oversaw various major projects such as the Warringah Freeway, the Gladesville Bridge, and the Roseville Bridge, at a time of major public investment in road projects.

After eight years as assistant commissioner, when commissioner Sherrard retired at the statutory retirement age of 65, Shaw rose to the office of Commissioner for Main Roads from 20 April 1962. As commissioner, in the 1966 New Year Honours he was made a Commander of the Order of the British Empire (CBE). He received the Queen Elizabeth II Coronation Medal in 1953. Shaw retired as Commissioner on 25 August 1967.

== Later career and legacy ==
After his retirement, Shaw served as the Deputy Chief Commissioner of the City of Sydney from its dismissal by the Askin Government on 14 November 1967 to 26 September 1969, being responsible for implementing the Askin Government's plans for reorganising the City of Sydney. Shaw also served as the National President of the Australian Road Federation from 1968 to 1979. He is the only Australian ever to have been honoured by the International Road Federation as "Man of the Year" in 1968. Shaw was then elected at the 6 February 1969 Election for the 1st Constituency of the Sydney County Council, which was responsible for the electricity network and utility services throughout much of Sydney. In January 1971, he was elected as chairman of the council, expressing his interest in the beautification of street electricity infrastructure: "I think that if undergrounding cannot be done then the poles should be made more attractive and erected straighter."

A long term resident of Manly and Balgowlah on the Northern Beaches of Sydney, Shaw died at Manly Hospital on 20 April 1983 at the ago of 80. Shaw's funeral was held on 26 April 1983 at St Matthew's Anglican Church, Manly, and he was buried at Frenchs Forest Cemetery.

In his memory, the "John Shaw Award" was initiated in the Queensland Region of the Australian Road Federation (now known as Roads Australia) in acknowledgment of "his outstanding contribution to roads". The national body of Roads Australia also has an award in his honour: the "John Shaw Medal", which is considered as one of the most significant achievements in the Australian road transport sector. In 1991, his son established the "JAL and DL Shaw Award" with the gift of $10 000 in memory of his father, for graduates of the University of Sydney Faculty of Engineering and Information Technologies.

Government offices
Preceded by Howard Macoun Sherrard	Assistant Commissioner for Main Roads; 1953–1962	Succeeded by Russell Thomas
Preceded by Howard Macoun Sherrard	Commissioner for Main Roads; 1962–1967	Succeeded by Russell Thomas
Civic offices
Preceded by John Armstrong as Lord Mayor of Sydney	Deputy Chief Commissioner of the City of Sydney; 1967–1969; With: Treatt, Pettingell	Succeeded by Sir Emmet McDermott as Lord Mayor of Sydney
Government offices
Preceded by Kath Anderson; Keith Joseph Murphy; Reginald Arthur Triggs	Councillor of the Sydney County Council; 1st Constituency; 1969–1971	Succeeded by Lynn Arnold
Preceded by George Ivan Ferris	Chairman of the Sydney County Council; 1970–1971	Succeeded by George Ivan Ferris
