= John Cramer (Australian politician) =

Australian politician

The Honourable Sir John Cramer
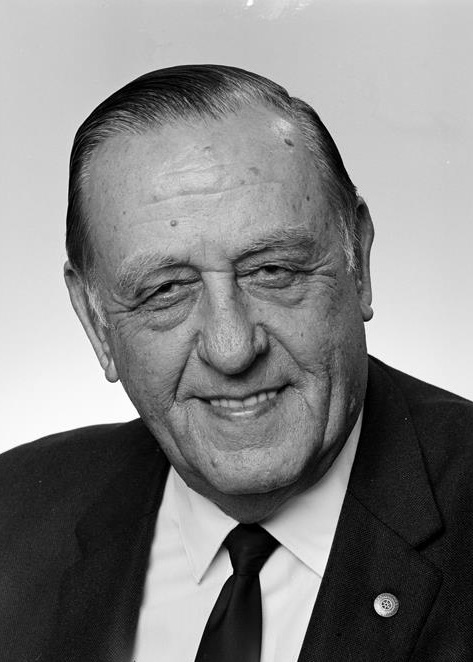
- Cramer in 1971

Minister for the Army
- In office 28 February 1956 – 18 December 1963
- Prime Minister: Robert Menzies
- Preceded by: Eric Harrison
- Succeeded by: Jim Forbes

Member of the Australian Parliament for Bennelong
- In office 10 December 1949 – 11 April 1974
- Preceded by: Division created
- Succeeded by: John Howard

Mayor of North Sydney
- In office 20 December 1939 – 6 December 1941
- Deputy: George Fowle
- Preceded by: James Stanton
- Succeeded by: George Fowle

Personal details
- Born: John Oscar Cramer; 18 February 1896 Quirindi, Colony of New South Wales
- Died: 18 May 1994 (aged 98) Sydney, New South Wales, Australia
- Party: UAP (to c. 1944); Democratic (1944); Liberal (from 1945)
- Spouse: Mary Therese Earls (m. 1922; died 1984)

Sir John Oscar Cramer (18 February 1896 – 18 May 1994) was an Australian businessman and politician. He was a member of the Liberal Party and served in federal parliament from 1949 to 1974, representing the seat of Bennelong. He served as Minister for the Army in the Menzies government from 1956 to 1963. He was also mayor of North Sydney from 1939 to 1941.

== Early life ==
Cramer was born on 18 February 1896 at Jacob and Joseph Creek near Quirindi, New South Wales. He was the fourth of six children born to Emily Eleanor (née Cullen) and John Nicholas Cramer; his mother was of Scottish and Irish descent and his father of German descent.

Cramer grew up on his father's farm, attending Gaspard Public School until the age of fourteen. He assisted his father with farm work and later managed a fruit shop in Quirindi. In 1917 he moved to Sydney and began working as a clerk with Paramount Pictures. He and his brother Charles were talented musicians and singers and provided musical accompaniment to silent films. In 1920, they established a real estate firm, Cramer Bros., with an office at Crows Nest in North Sydney. Later joined by another brother, Reg, they achieved success through several business ventures including a syndicate subdividing land in Willoughby and a partnership in a building firm specialising in apartment blocks.

== Early political involvement ==
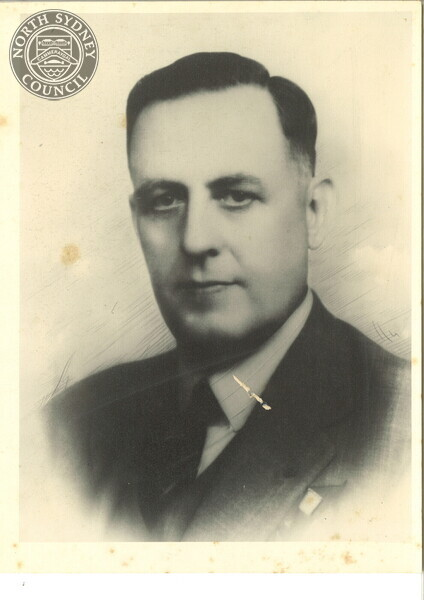
Cramer in 1939

Cramer became active in politics during the Great Depression, joining the All for Australia League which was later incorporated into the United Australia Party (UAP). After the collapse of the UAP in the early 1940s he joined the Democratic Party and was an unsuccessful candidate in the seat of Lane Cove at the 1944 New South Wales state election. He was subsequently involved in the formation of the Liberal Party of Australia (New South Wales Division) and was elected to the party's provisional executive in January 1945.

In 1931, Cramer was elected to the North Sydney Municipal Council in 1931. He was elected as mayor of North Sydney in 1939 and served until his defeat as an alderman at the December 1941 municipal elections. From 1935 to 1956, Cramer served on the Sydney County Council (3rd/4th Constituency). In 1939 and 1945, he was elected Deputy Chairman, and was later elected for three terms as Chairman of the County Council (1946–1947; 1948–1950).

== Federal politics ==
He was elected to the House of Representatives as the inaugural representative of the seat of Bennelong on its creation in 1949. In 1956, the Prime Minister Robert Menzies appointed him Minister for the Army, a portfolio he held until 1963. On 23 January 1956, on his appointment as army minister Cramer resigned his 4th Constituency seat on the county council.

Cramer's service as army minister included the final years of Australia's involvement in the Malayan Emergency and the prelude to Vietnam War. He toured South-East Asia in 1958 and met with South Vietnamese president Ngo Dinh Diem, who had toured Australia the previous year.

Cramer was the only Catholic in the Liberal Party parliamentary team, a fact Menzies would often joke about. He was "ardently opposed to communism, suspicious of socialism, and single-minded in his advocacy of free enterprise".

In 1964 Cramer was created a Knight Bachelor. He remained in parliament as a backbencher for a decade and was critical of Liberal leader John Gorton, supporting his eventual replacement by William McMahon. He announced his retirement from politics in November 1973, and was succeeded by future prime minister John Howard as the MP for Bennelong at the 1974 election. He died 20 years later to the very day, on 18 May 1994, aged 98. Cramer had been the last serving parliamentarian born before Federation, and he was the last surviving former MP who was born in the 19th century.

== Personal life ==
In 1922 he married Mary Therese Earls, a teacher, and his elder by two and a half years. The couple had four children: John, Erle, Bronwyn and Leonie. For her four decades of service as a charity worker and community activist, Lady Cramer was created a Dame Commander of the Order of the British Empire in 1971.

Dame Mary Cramer predeceased her husband by almost a decade, dying on 23 September 1984 (aged 91).

== Writings ==
- Cramer, John (1989). Pioneers, politics and people: a political memoir. Sydney: Allen & Unwin. p. 231. ISBN 978-0-04-442104-7.

Civic offices
Preceded by James Street Stanton	Deputy Mayor of North Sydney; 1937 – 1939	Succeeded by George Augustus Fowle
Preceded by James Street Stanton	Mayor of North Sydney; 1939 – 1941	Succeeded by George Augustus Fowle
Government offices
New title	Councillor of the Sydney County Council; 3rd Constituency; 1935 – 1949	Succeeded by Reginald William Bieler; Thomas Hogan
New title	Councillor of the Sydney County Council; 4th Constituency; 1949 – 1956; Served alongside: William Parker Henson	Succeeded by George Ivan Ferris
Preceded by Stanley Parry	Deputy Chairman of the Sydney County Council; 1939 – 1940	Succeeded by Stanley Parry
Preceded by Arthur McElhone	Deputy Chairman of the Sydney County Council; 1945 – 1946	Succeeded by Arthur McElhone
Preceded by Arthur McElhone	Chairman of the Sydney County Council; 1946 – 1947	Succeeded by Frank Grenville Pursell
Preceded by Frank Grenville Pursell	Chairman of the Sydney County Council; 1948 – 1950	Succeeded by William Parker Henson
Parliament of Australia
New division	Member for Bennelong; 1949 – 1974	Succeeded by John Howard
Political offices
Preceded by Eric Harrison	Minister for the Army; 1956 – 1963	Succeeded by James Forbes
