= Vernon Treatt =

Australian politician

The Honourable Sir Vernon Treatt KBE, MM, QC
- Treatt in 1940.

17th Leader of the Opposition of New South Wales
- In office 20 March 1946 – 10 August 1954
- Monarchs: George VI; Elizabeth II
- Deputy: Walter Howarth; Robert Askin
- Preceded by: Alexander Mair
- Succeeded by: Murray Robson

Minister for Justice
- In office 16 August 1939 – 16 May 1941
- Premier: Alexander Mair
- Preceded by: Lewis Martin
- Succeeded by: Reg Downing

Member of the New South Wales Parliament for Woollahra
- In office 26 March 1938 – 5 February 1962
- Preceded by: Harold Mason
- Succeeded by: Seat abolished

Chief Commissioner of the City of Sydney
- In office 14 November 1967 – 26 September 1969
- Deputy: John Shaw
- Preceded by: John Armstrong
- Succeeded by: Sir Lawrence Emmet McDermott

Personal details
- Born: Vernon Haddon Treatt; 15 May 1897 Singleton, New South Wales
- Died: 20 September 1984 (aged 87) Sydney, New South Wales
- Spouse(s): Dorothy Henderson; Frankie Wilson (Lady Treatt)
- Occupation: Politician and lawyer

Military service
- Allegiance: Australia
- Branch/service: Australian Army
- Years of service: 1913–1914; 1916–1919
- Rank: Sergeant
- Unit: Australian Cadet Corps; 6th Field Artillery, RAA
- Battles/wars: First World War; Western Front
- Awards: Military Medal

Sir Vernon Haddon Treatt KBE, MM, QC (15 May 1897 – 20 September 1984) was an Australian lawyer, soldier, Rhodes Scholar and politician. Born in Singleton, New South Wales and educated at Shore School, Treatt interrupted his studies at the University of Sydney to enlist at the outbreak of the First World War. Serving in the Royal Australian Artillery, Treatt served in France and was awarded the Military Medal. Upon returning to Australia he was awarded a Rhodes scholarship and further educated at New College, Oxford.

After briefly practising law in 1923 in Britain, Treatt returned to Australia and was admitted to the New South Wales bar that same year, serving as a Crown Prosecutor at the supreme court. Treatt also was the Challis law lecturer at the University of Sydney. Treatt entered the New South Wales Legislative Assembly on 26 March 1938, representing the Electoral district of Woollahra for the United Australia Party (UAP). When UAP Premier Bertram Stevens was ousted from the leadership in August 1939 and Alexander Mair became Premier, Mair appointed Treatt, after serving only a few months in Parliament, as the Minister for Justice. He served in this office until the UAP lost power in 1941.

During this time Treatt witnessed the break-up of the UAP into the various parties including the Democratic Party, which he joined, and then the establishment of the Liberal Party of Australia as the major conservative political force in Australia in 1945. When the second leader of the party, Alexander Mair, resigned in March 1946, Treatt was elected to succeed him. As the third leader of the new party, Treatt became the first leader to contest an election. After serving eight years and almost winning government at the 1950 election, Treatt resigned as Leader in August 1954 following a July attempt to depose him. He continued as a member of parliament until he was defeated in 1962 and thereafter served in various organisations and posts, including as a Chief Commissioner of the City of Sydney in 1969, until his death in 1984.

== Early life ==
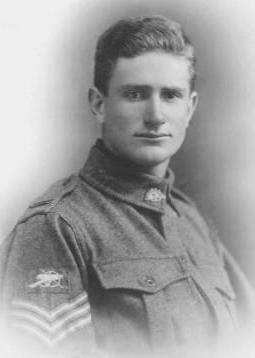
Sergeant Treatt during his military service in 1917

Vernon Treatt was born in Singleton, New South Wales, in 1897, the youngest son of Frank Burford Treatt (1845–1923), a Police Magistrate and migrant from Devon, England, and Kate Ellen Walsh (1856–1936), and was first educated at Young District School. When the Treatts moved to Sydney, he attended the Sydney Church of England Grammar School from 1913 to 1914, becoming a Prefect and Cadet Lieutenant. Treatt then took up residence in 1915 at St. Paul's College while studying for a Bachelor of Arts (BA) at the University of Sydney. During the First World War in 1916, Treatt interrupted his studies and enlisted as a gunner in the Royal Australian Artillery, 6th Field Artillery Battery. He was sent over on 5 November 1917 to the Western Front and was later promoted to Sergeant. For his service he received the Military Medal on 14 May 1919.

Upon returning from the military he completed his studies in 1920 and was awarded a Rhodes scholarship in the same year, at New College, Oxford. At Oxford, Treatt gained a Master of Arts and a Bachelor of Civil Law in 1923 and was briefly admitted to the bar at Lincoln's Inn in that year. When he returned to Australia, Treatt was appointed to the New South Wales Bar and also as the Sub Warden of St Paul's College, University of Sydney from 1925 to 1930. In 1927, he played first grade Rugby Union for the Drummoyne DRFC. He married Dorothy Isabelle Henderson (1902–1992) on 5 June 1930 and had four children: George Vernon, John Vernon (1930–1935), Rosemary Vernon (1930–1944), and Diana Vernon.

In 1927, Treatt was given the position of Challis lecturer in criminal law at the University of Sydney, a position he was to hold until 1959. One of his students was the future Justice of the High Court of Australia, Michael Kirby: "I can still see Mr Vernon Treatt QC coming on to the stage of the Phillip Street Theatre where we took some of our lectures. Treatt's task was to instruct a hundred first year law students in that most important discipline, criminal law. I can see him toss his hat onto the chair, open his notes and begin reading his latest lesson. I can hear him talking about the sections of the Crimes Act 1900 of New South Wales dealing with 'unnatural offences'. I can recall his rasping voice as he intoned the old provisions of section 79, spitting out the exceptionally ugly words of denunciation in the parliamentary prose". In March 1928, Treatt was appointed and served as a Crown Prosecutor for the Supreme Court of New South Wales and the Court of Quarter sessions for the metropolitan district.

== Political career ==
Treatt first entered politics at the 1927 state election as an Independent Nationalist candidate for the Legislative Assembly seat of Willoughby. He narrowly lost on a margin of 49.47%. After several years Treatt tried again to enter parliament at the 26 March 1938 state election as the United Australia Party candidate for the seat of Woollahra. On this occasion he was successful, gaining 53.62% of the vote.

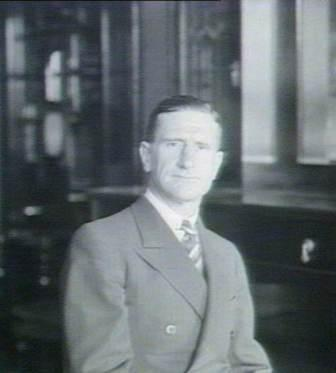
Treatt in his office as Minister for Justice in February 1940

=== Minister of the Crown ===
On 16 August 1938, after only serving a few months as a member of parliament, Treatt was appointed as the Minister for Justice in the government of Alexander Mair, who had become Premier after Bertram Stevens was defeated in a motion of no confidence in the house. In 1940, he was made a King's Counsel (KC).

As Minister for Justice, Treatt generated controversy when it was alleged that he had acted to reduce a fine imposed on the Abbco Bread Company who had sold short-weight bread to the Department of Defence. It resulted in a Royal Commission in the matter from March to August 1941, chaired by Justice Maxwell, after a censure motion introduced by Labor Leader William McKell was defeated. He was removed of any suspicion in the findings with the Royal Commissioner finding that: "There is no evidence, nor any thing even remotely to suggest that the Minister was guilty of any misconduct or irregularity either in the conclusion reached by him, and fully shared by the permanent head of his department, that the fine was too severe or in the manner of his dealing with the company's application. From start to finish I can discover nothing suggesting any irregularity in any action by the Minister."

=== Opposition ===
He served as Minister until the 10 May 1941 election when the Mair Government was defeated in a landslide defeat, losing 20 seats. Despite this, Treatt retained his seat with a significant margin increase of 67.68%. With the very poor results of the federal United Australia Party under Billy Hughes at the 1943 Federal election, the UAP disintegrated. A large number of former UAP members, including Treatt, then formed the Democratic Party in New South Wales, led by Alexander Mair, while others moved into the Commonwealth Party and the Liberal Democratic Party. The Democratic Party then merged with the Commonwealth Party in January 1944. Mair resigned in 1944 to be replaced by Reginald Weaver, who then led the hopelessly divided conservative forces to defeat at the 27 May 1944 election, losing another three seats. Treatt retained his seat with 50.50%.

In 1944, the Democratic Party and Commonwealth Party merged as the United Democratic Party, which became the NSW division of the Liberal Party a year later. The merged party's first state leader in NSW, Weaver, died in office in November 1945. Mair succeeded him, with Treatt succeeding Athol Richardson as Deputy Leader. After five months as Leader, Mair resigned in March 1946 and Treatt was then elected to succeed him as party leader and hence, Leader of the Opposition.

=== Leadership ===
The third Leader of the New South Wales Liberal Party, Treatt became the first to contest an election. At the election on 3 May 1947, Treatt's Liberals and Michael Bruxner's Country Party failed to defeat the Labor government, now under new Premier James McGirr, despite an overall swing of 4.5% and a gain of seven seats. Treatt retained his seat with an increased 69.75%.

As opposition leader, Treatt proved effective in attacking the shortcomings of the McGirr's Labor government and in the Labor Party on a national level, particularly in areas of economics: "Because of the inflationary pressure, which is largely a result of the Socialists' own low production policy, continuation of subsidies is necessary on basic everyday goods ..." and utilities: "The public is sick of seeing Ministers hunting up alibis, shifting about from one explanation to another and washing their hands of responsibility for powershortages on some flimsy pretext." In matters of ideology, Treatt supported Federal Liberal Leader Robert Menzies in his firm opposition to communism, particularly from the Soviet Union, China and Korea. After returning from the Empire Parliamentary Conference in London in December 1948, Treatt declared "The Communists are on the move throughout the world. Australians must sit up and take just as much notice of what is happening across our narrow northern waters … It is of outstanding importance to Australia that the Western Powers' should secure some uniform policy to combat the Communist Asian menace." Treatt led the Coalition again at the 17 June 1950 election, which resulted in a hung parliament, with Treatt's Coalition gaining 12 seats and a swing of 6.7% for a total of 46 seats. With the Labor Party also holding 46 seats, the balance of power lay with the two re-elected Independent Labor members, James Geraghty and John Seiffert, who had been expelled from the party for disloyalty during the previous parliament. Under a legalistic interpretation of the ALP rules, Seiffert was readmitted to the party (because he had not actually opposed an official ALP candidate, as Geraghty had) and, together with Geraghty, kept McGirr's government in power. On 20 June, Treatt declared that he and his party would not make any concessions or compromises to the Labor Party, particularly in regards to the election of a speaker. Treatt retained his seat with 76.09%.

In his third term as Leader, Treatt criticised government cuts in transport services, but supported reductions in death duty taxes. At a Remembrance Day address in 1952, Treatt criticised radical student politics embodied by the "long-haired intellectual types": "My belief in the value of university life and in higher education generally is a strong and abiding one … the sort of long-haired type I am thinking about may not even have a university degree. He is encased in self satisfied assurance of his own mental superiority."

In a speech at Sydney's Lyceum Hall, Treatt warned of Australia's attitudes on its success: "A sort of mental haze seems to obscure the vision splendid that lies before this country. We are proud of being a British country, a country with British traditions, institutions, and all those things which go to make up what we call our 'British heritage'. But this pride is not matched by a pride in being Australian. This seems to me one of the strongest sources of our weakness."

The near loss of the election by Labor further weakened McGirr's position and he was replaced as premier by Joseph Cahill in April 1952. Cahill had won popular support as a vigorous and impressive minister who had resolved problems with New South Wales' electricity supply and in his first 10 months as premier had reinvigorated the party. He appeared decisive and brought order to the government's chaotic public works program. In addition, he attacked the increasingly unpopular federal Coalition government of Menzies.

All this contributed to Treatt's Coalition being easily defeated at the 14 February 1953 election, with a total loss of ten seats and a swing against it of 7.2%. Treatt retained his seat with 67.61%. On 3 February 1954, Treatt received, along with Premier Cahill, Her Majesty Queen Elizabeth II, Queen of Australia, at Farm Cove, Sydney, at the beginning of her first visit to Australia. This was first occasion on which a reigning monarch (as opposed to an heir-apparent) had set foot on Australian soil. Treatt was also present on 4 February when Her Majesty opened the Parliament of New South Wales, the first time a monarch had opened an Australian parliament.

After three consecutive election losses, Treatt was no longer able to control the factional infighting among the Liberals. The party's deputy leader, Walter Howarth, resigned on 22 July 1954, having complained that Treatt doubted his loyalty. Robert Askin, the Liberal Whip, took Howarth's place. Howarth's resignation split the party and sparked a leadership challenge from Pat Morton, who criticised Treatt's "lack of aggression" towards the Labor government.

At the party meeting on 6 July, Treatt narrowly defeated Morton with 12 votes to 10. Nevertheless, he did not stay much longer as leader. On 6 August he announced that he would resign four days later:

"Following the unsuccessful challenge for the Parliamentary leadership, it was expected that there would be an end to activities so damaging to the party's morale and effectiveness. Unfortunately these activities have continued. The responsibilities of a political leader, particularly at the present time in New South Wales, are very heavy, and a leader giving of his best is entitled to receive the fullest support from every member of the party. This support has not been forthcoming, and without it the burdens on health and effectiveness would prove too much for any man."

The subsequent party meeting produced no obvious candidate for the leadership. Neither Askin nor Morton could obtain a majority of votes. Accordingly, Askin asked another prominent Liberal, Murray Robson, to nominate himself. This solved the problem, and Robson became leader, although Treatt remained in parliament. On 17 June 1955, the Queen granted Treatt permission to retain the title "The Honourable" for life, for having served as Leader of the Opposition and the Executive Council of New South Wales.

== Later life ==
Robson did not have the chance to lead the Liberals to an election. Morton deposed him in 1955, and proceeded to lead the Coalition to another defeat in March 1956, while Treatt increased his majority within his own electorate (where he remained very popular) to 70.84%. At the next election, in March 1959, Morton and the Coalition lost once more to Cahill, who thereby scored his third consecutive victory. Divorcing his first wife, Treatt remarried to Frankie Jessie Embleton Wilson on 16 May 1960. Frankie Wilson was a lawyer who attended St Mary's Anglican Girls' School in Perth and was the granddaughter of Frank Wilson who twice served as Premier of Western Australia.

Treatt stayed in Parliament until his seat was abolished before the upcoming election in 1962, at which point he stood for the new seat of Bligh. At the 1962 election, Treatt was defeated by the Labor candidate, Tom Morey, gaining only 45.29% of the vote. Treatt then joined local government circles, becoming Chair of the Boundaries Commission from 1964 to 1969 and was later appointed as the Chief Commissioner for the dismissed City of Sydney from 1967 to 1969, overseeing the redistribution of council boundaries and reorganisation of council agencies. He also served as the President of the Sydney Cricket and Sports Ground Trust from 1965 to 1967. For his service as Chief Commissioner, he was knighted as a Knight Commander of the Order of the British Empire (KBE) in 1970. Treatt died on 20 September 1984 in Sydney.

New South Wales Legislative Assembly
| Preceded by Harold Mason | Member for Woollahra; 1938 – 1962 | District abolished |
Political offices
| Preceded by Lewis Martin | Minister for Justice; 1939 – 1941 | Succeeded by Reg Downing |
| Preceded by Alexander Mair | Leader of the Opposition of New South Wales; 1946 – 1954 | Succeeded by Murray Robson |
Party political offices
| Preceded by Athol Richardson | Deputy Leader of the New South Wales Liberal Party; 1946 | Succeeded by Walter Howarth |
| Preceded by Alexander Mair | Leader of the New South Wales Liberal Party; 1946 – 1954 | Succeeded by Murray Robson |
Civic offices
| Preceded by John Armstrong as Lord Mayor of Sydney | Chief Commissioner of the City of Sydney; 1967 – 1969; With: Shaw, Pettingell | Succeeded by Sir Lawrence Emmet McDermott as Lord Mayor of Sydney |
