= William Parker Henson =

Australian politician

William Henson

Chairman of the Sydney County Council
- In office 24 January 1950 – 7 January 1952
- Preceded by: John Cramer
- Succeeded by: Pat Hills

Alderman of the City of Sydney
- In office 2 December 1944 – 30 November 1962
- Constituency: Fitzroy Ward; Macquarie Ward; City Ward; Gipps Ward

Councillor of the Sydney County Council for the 4th Constituency
- In office 19 July 1946 – 10 November 1971 Serving with George Ivan Ferris
- Preceded by: Arthur McElhone
- Succeeded by: Innes Stanley Haviland

Personal details
- Born: William Parker Henson; 21 January 1905 Stanmore, New South Wales
- Died: 21 September 1999 (aged 94) Epping, New South Wales
- Party: Civic Reform Association
- Occupation: Accountant; Company director

William Parker Henson (21 January 1905 – 21 September 1999) was an Australian local government representative who represented the Civic Reform Association on the Council of the City of Sydney and as a councillor and chairman of the Sydney County Council. In business and professional life he was an accountant and company director.

== Early life ==
Henson was born in Stanmore, an inner-western suburb of Sydney, New South Wales. He was the only son of Eustace Horatious Henson and Isabel (née Parker) and had an older sister, Jean, and a younger sister, Phillis. Henson attended his father's alma mater, Newington College (1918–1922), during the headmastership of the Rev Dr Charles Prescott. He continued to live in Stanmore until 1930.

== Working life ==
After school, Henson studied to become a chartered accountant and was the senior partner in the Sydney-based firm of Henson Gates & Co. He was the managing director of William Andrews Printing Co Pty Ltd and a director of Howard Auto Cultivators Ltd and of Gosford Quarries Pty Ltd.

In 1942, Henson became a member of the NSW Board of the Federal Institute of Accountants and was vice-chairman in 1949. He was NSW State President of the Australian Society of Accountants from 1953 to 1954. Henson was an executive member of the Constitutional Association and Secretary of the NSW Health Week Committee.

== Political career ==
Henson was elected for Fitzroy Ward on the Council of the City of Sydney on 2 December 1944 and served until 31 December 1948. he was the elected for Macquarie Ward on 4 December 1948 and served until 1 December 1950. He again was elected for Fitzroy Ward on 2 December 1950 and served until 4 December 1953. He was the elected for City Ward on 5 December 1953 and served until 4 December 1959 before finally being elected for Gipps Ward on 5 December 1959 and serving until 30 November 1962. Henson was a member of the Finance Committee from 1945 until 1959 and was its vice-chairman in 1948. He served on the City Planning and Improvements Committee from 1945 until 1948 and again from 1949 until 1959, the Health and Recreations Committee in 1948 and from 1960 until 1962 and also on the Works Committee from 1960 until his retirement from council in 1962.

In 1946, Henson was elected as a Councillor on the Sydney County Council, which was the authority responsible for electricity supplies in Sydney. He continued to be an elected member of that council until 1966 and served as its Deputy chairman in 1948 and 1956 and chairman in 1950.

At the state level, Henson was a member of the United Australia Party and ran in the Electoral district of Hornsby in 1938.

== Death ==
Henson died at his Epping home aged 95 and was cremated at the Northern Suburbs Crematorium. In lieu of flowers, it was requested that donations be sent to the Royal Blind Society.

Government offices
Preceded by John Cramer	Chairman of the Sydney County Council; 1950 – 1952	Succeeded by Pat Hills
