= Cammeray Substation =

Electrical substation in Australia

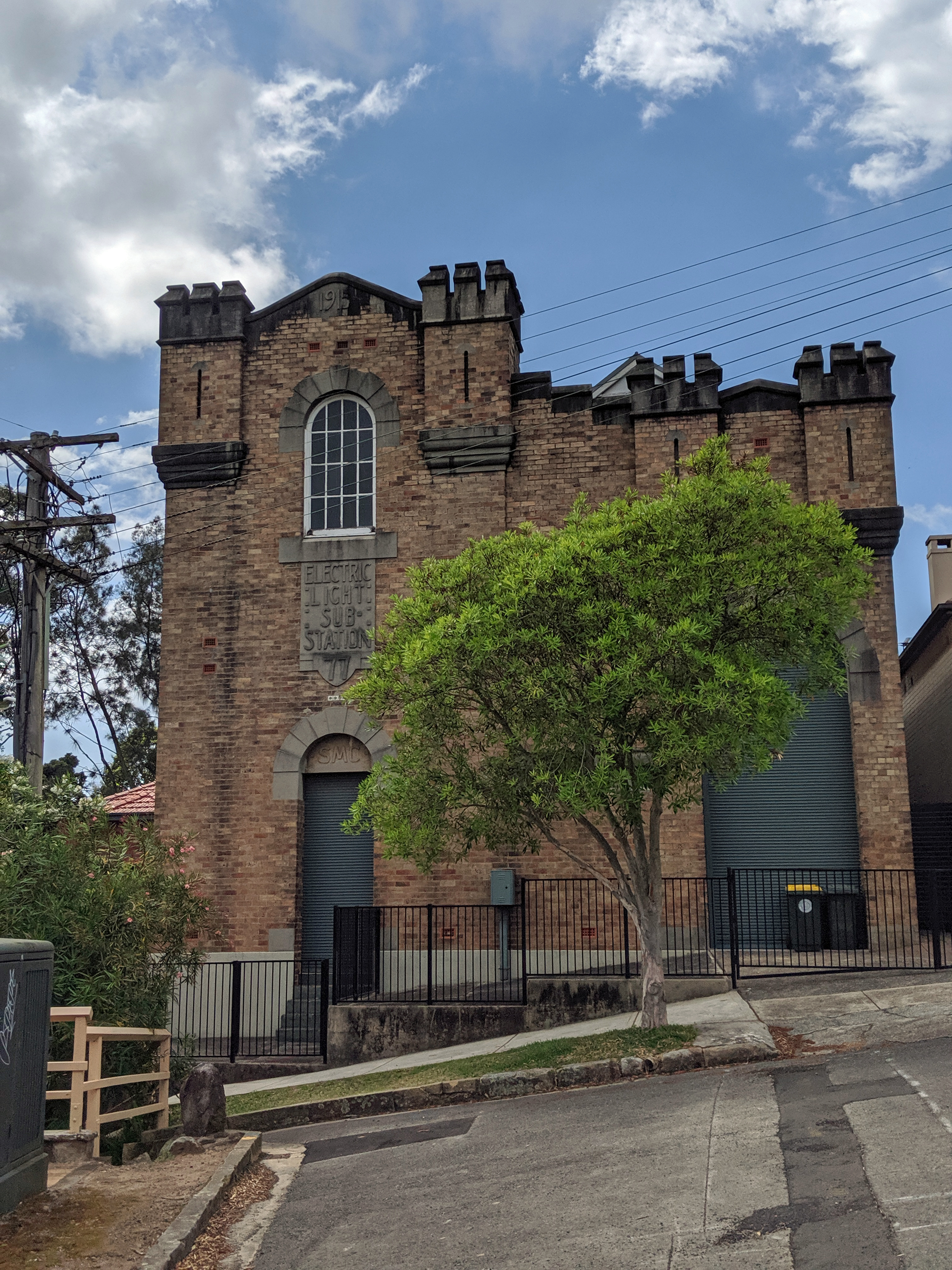
- Cammeray Electrical Substation, 143 Bellevue Street, Cammeray, New South Wales

- Location within Sydney Location within Australia
- 33°49′10″S 151°12′46″E
- Location: 143 Bellevue Street, Cammeray, North Sydney Council, New South Wales, Australia

History
- Built: 1915–

Site notes
- Owner: Ausgrid

New South Wales Heritage Register
- Official name: Substation - Bellevue, Cammeray; #77 Pine Street
- Type: State heritage (built)
- Designated: 2 April 1999
- Reference no.: 937
- Type: Electricity Transformer/Substation
- Category: Utilities - Electricity

The Cammeray Substation is a heritage-listed electrical substation at 143 Bellevue Street, Cammeray, New South Wales, a suburb of Sydney, Australia. The Substation was built in 1915. It is also known as Substation - Bellevue, Cammeray and #77 Pine Street. It was added to the New South Wales State Heritage Register on 2 April 1999.

== History ==
The Pine Street substation is a purpose designed and built structure dating from 1915. "1915" and "ELECTRIC LIGHT SUB-STATION" appear on the facade in relief. Historical Period: 1901-1925.

== Description ==
The Pine Street substation is an unusual, tall, two story well-detailed face brick building set back from the street. It has an asymmetrical facade designed in the Interwar Gothic style which features a Tudor inspired "tower" facade incorporating crenellations, a large arched doorway to one side, and a round headed window to the other. Stylistic elements include rounded-gable parapets, and an Art Nouveau lettering plaque over the smaller entrance. The Pine street substation is constructed using load bearing face brick with cement rendered details. It makes use of brick arches. The building was completed in the Interwar Gothic architectural style. Exterior materials include face brick, cement render, and a steel roller shutter.

=== Condition ===
As at 13 November 2000, good.

== Heritage Listing ==
As at 13 November 2000, the Pine Street substation is an unusual, rare and representative example of a well-detailed Interwar Gothic building built in face brick with rendered details.

The Cammeray Substation was listed on the New South Wales State Heritage Register on 2 April 1999.

== See also ==
- Ausgrid
