= Michael Towke =

Australian engineer, business executive

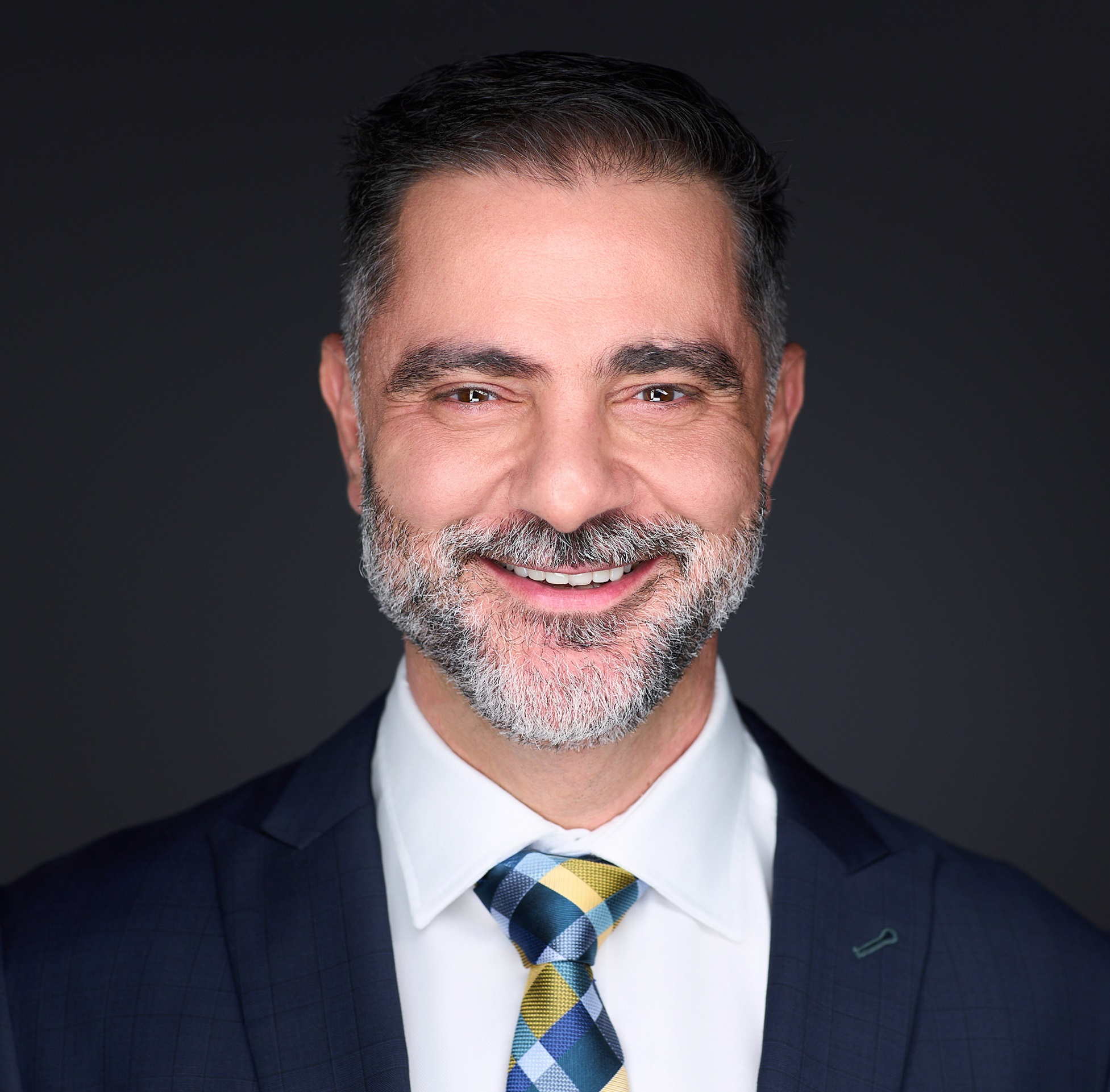
- Born: July 3, 1975 (age 51)
- Citizenship: Australian
- Education: University of Sydney (BE) AGSM (MBA)
- Occupations: Engineer, business executive, former political candidate

Michael Towke (born July 3, 1975) is an Australian engineer, business executive, and former political candidate. He is known for his involvement in the 2007 preselection for the Liberal Party of Australia in the federal seat of Cook, where he defeated several prominent candidates, including future Prime Minister Scott Morrison, by a margin of 82 votes to 8. Towke is a Fellow of the Australian Institute of Company Directors and has made significant contributions to the fields of renewable energy, intelligent transport systems (ITS), information communication technology (ICT), and voluntary community service.

== Early life and education ==
Towke (born Taouk) was born in Surry Hills, Sydney, Australia. His parents, Michael and Afifi Sarkis-Taouk are first-generation immigrants of Maronite Lebanese heritage. Towke is the first of their eight children and speaks fluent Arabic.

He completed a Bachelor of Engineering (Telecommunications) and a Bachelor of Arts (Social Policy and Philosophy), both with First Class Honours from the University of Sydney. Towke was recognized on the Dean of Engineering's List of Excellence for three consecutive years and won the Alan Davis Memorial Prize for Dux of Sociology.

He later completed a Master of Business Administration (MBA) from the Australian Graduate School of Management (AGSM). He is currently pursuing a Master of International Relations and Master of Security and Strategic Studies at Macquarie University. Towke also holds a certificate in Applied Business Analytics from the Massachusetts Institute of Technology (MIT) and served in the Australian Army Reserve's University of New South Wales regiment (UNSWR).

== Career ==
=== Engineering, Telecommunications, Intelligent Transport and Renewable Energy ===
Towke has worked as a software and telecommunications engineer, senior manager, and director in the information and communications technology (ICT), intelligent transport systems (ITS), and renewable energy sectors. He is currently Ausgrid's Battery Energy Storage Systems (BESS) Director, contributing to developing economically and environmentally sustainable energy solutions.

Towke has published several peer-reviewed scientific papers, including the use of AI and data dependence to optimize the public transport network, as well as the optimization of code allocations in wireless telecommunications systems. Towke has presented findings from this research at several conferences, including the Intelligent Transport Systems World Congress in Singapore, where he represented the Australian state government agency Transport for NSW.

=== Political career ===
In 2007, Towke won the Liberal Party preselection for the safe federal seat of Cook, easily defeating several high-profile candidates, including Scott Morrison, Mark Speakman, David Coleman, and Paul Fletcher. However, his candidacy was marred by a racially motivated media campaign containing false allegations, which led to his resignation from the race. Towke later successfully sued for defamation, securing apologies and settlements from several media outlets and the Liberal Party. Scott Morrison's direct involvement in the 2007 media scandal that led to Towke's resignation and Morrison's subsequent rise to prominence was revealed in a senate speech by then-Liberal Senator Concetta Fierravanti-Wells in March 2022. Towke subsequently spoke out about the 2007 events, confirming Fierravanti-Wells’ claims. Morrison denied the allegations, declaring he would sign a statutory declaration to that effect but never did. The fresh scandal impacted Morrison's election campaign, contributing to his eventual loss 4 weeks later.

=== Community Service ===
Towke has been an active St Vincent de Paul Society member for over 25 years, which included serving as its Sutherland Shire Regional President for four years. He has advocated for transparency and accountability within the organization, including whistleblowing on issues such as waste management and the mistreatment of a priest. His whistleblowing led to a full investigation by the Society's State Council and resulted in substantial changes in its governance.

Towke was also an active volunteer surf lifesaving guard and participated in a number of rescues providing first aid.

== Awards and recognition ==
- Alan Davis Memorial Prize for Dux of Sociology, University of Sydney.
- Dean of Engineering List of Excellence, University of Sydney (three consecutive years).
- Recognition for 2 years of voluntary service with the St Vincent de Paul Society.
