= David Griffin (politician) =

Australian politician

Sir David Griffin

74th Lord Mayor of Sydney
- In office September 1972 – 24 September 1973
- Deputy: Nicholas Shehadie
- Preceded by: Sir Emmet McDermott
- Succeeded by: Sir Nicholas Shehadie

Personal details
- Born: 8 July 1915 Leura, New South Wales
- Died: 25 March 2004 (aged 88) Mittagong, New South Wales

Sir Charles David Griffin CBE (8 July 1915 – 25 March 2004) was an Australian lawyer and businessman, and the Lord Mayor of Sydney from 1972 to 1973. He was a prisoner of war at Changi in Singapore during World War II, and a poet.

Always known as David, Griffin was born in Leura in the Blue Mountains and was educated at Cranbrook. In 1941 he sailed for Malaya and was present in Singapore at its fall to the Japanese in 1942. A prisoner of war in Changi for three years, he was released in 1945.

He returned to the legal profession in Sydney. He was elected to the council of the City of Sydney in 1962 representing the Civic Reform Association, before becoming Lord Mayor in 1972.

Griffin had been involved in radio and the theatre, and in 2002 published a book of poems written in Changi, including The Happiness Box. While in Changi, he collected many poems written by Australian and British soldiers there, and kept them in a cardboard box for over 45 years before releasing them. He retired to Mittagong in the Southern Highlands of New South Wales, and died on 25 March 2004.

== Honours ==
In 1972 Griffin was appointed a Commander of the Order of the British Empire for "services to industry", and appointed a Knight Bachelor in 1974 for "services to the community".

Preceded by Sir Emmet McDermott	Lord Mayor of Sydney; 1972–1973	Succeeded by Sir Nicholas Shehadie
