= Stanley Parry =

Australian politician

Stanley Evan Parry OBE (23 November 1895 – 23 June 1973) was an Australian politician.

He was born at Ashfield to master builder William Evan Parry and Bessie Locke. He attended Gordon Public School and became a builder before serving in World War I with the 1st Field Engineers. He was discharged due to shellshock in 1916 and returned to the building trade. On 26 May 1917 he married Gladys Victoria Green; they had two children. From 1928 to 1947 he was a Canterbury alderman, serving as mayor from 1932 to 1947, and from 1940 to 1952 he was an independent member of the New South Wales Legislative Council. He was appointed Officer of the Order of the British Empire in 1963. Parry died at Petersham in 1973.

Civic offices
Preceded by George Harold Bramston	Mayor of Canterbury; 1932 – 1947	Succeeded by Harold McPherson
Government offices
Preceded by Harry Gardiner	Chairman of the Sydney County Council; 1939 – 1940	Succeeded by Ernest Tresidder
Preceded by Ernest Tresidder	Chairman of the Sydney County Council; 1941 – 1942	Succeeded by William Neville Harding
Preceded by William Neville Harding	Chairman of the Sydney County Council; 1943 – 1945	Succeeded by Arthur McElhone
