= Mary Cramer =

Australian charity and community worker

Mary Cramer DBE
- Born: Mary Therese Earls; 10 July 1893; New South Wales
- Died: 23 September 1984 (aged 91)
- Spouse: Sir John Cramer

Mary Therese Cramer DBE (née Earls; 10 July 1893 – 23 September 1984) was an Australian charity and community worker. She was the wife of Sir John Cramer, a Liberal federal politician and minister.

== Biography ==
Mary Therese Earls was born in New South Wales in 1893, the eldest of six children of William Earls and his wife Maria (née Kirby), who had emigrated to Australia from Ireland several years earlier.

She became a teacher. On 14 January 1922, she married John Cramer in the Sydney suburb of Petersham, and they had four children: John, Erle, Bronwyn and Leonie.

John Cramer became Mayor of North Sydney in 1939, and Mary Cramer assumed the duties of Lady Mayoress.

When World War II broke out, she organised a Voluntary Aid Detachment for North Sydney, and also the first group of the Women's Australian National Service in Sydney and became its first commandant. She was president of the New South Wales division of the Australian Red Cross and of the Advisory Board of the Mater Misericordiae Hospital in North Sydney.

In the 1949 Australian federal election, John Cramer was elected the inaugural member for the Division of Bennelong in the Australian House of Representatives, representing the Liberal Party of Australia. He was Minister for the Army 1956-63 in Robert Menzies' government. In 1964, he was knighted and she was then known as Lady Cramer. On 12 June 1971, Lady Cramer was appointed a Dame Commander of the Order of the British Empire (DBE) in recognition of service to the public, which was said to have left an indelible mark on the lower North Shore. She had maintained her public activities for four decades although being prone to recurring illness. Sir John Cramer retired from parliament at the 1974 election.

== Death ==
Dame Mary Cramer died in September 1984, aged 91, and was buried at the Macquarie Park Cemetery and Crematorium. Her husband outlived her by almost a decade, dying in 1994, aged 98.
