= Sydney Showground Stadium =

Stadium in Sydney, Australia

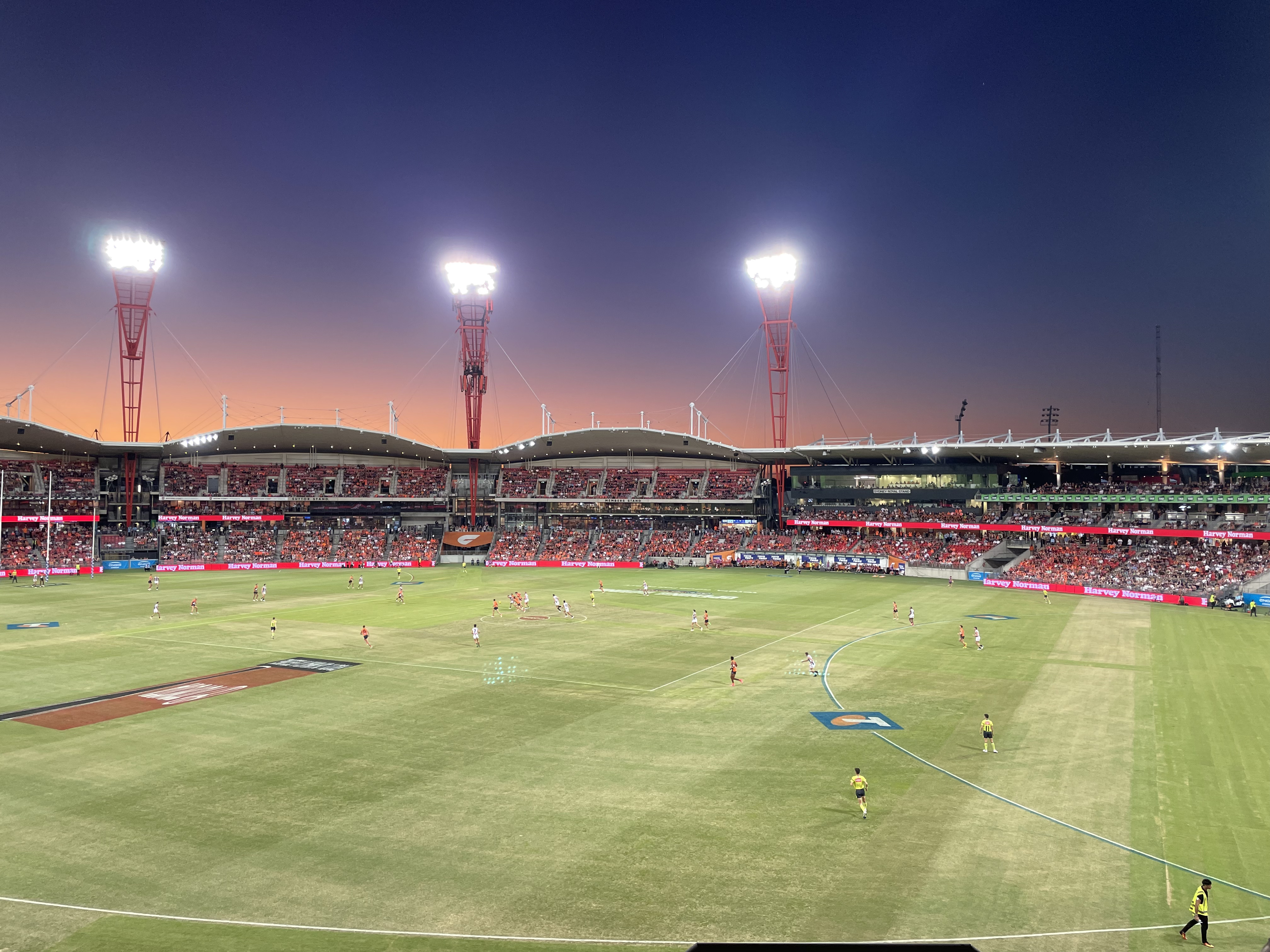
- View of the stadium in March 2024
- Interactive map of Sydney Showground Stadium
- Full name: Sydney Showground Stadium
- Former names: Sydney Showgrounds Main Arena (1998–2012); Sydney Baseball Stadium (2000); Škoda Stadium (2012–2014); Spotless Stadium (2014–2019); Giants Stadium (2019–2024)
- Location: Sydney Olympic Park, New South Wales
- Coordinates: 33°50′35″S 151°4′4″E
- Owner: New South Wales Government
- Operator: Royal Agricultural Society of NSW
- Capacity: 23,500; 22,102 (Cricket); 21,500 (1998–2011)
- Surface: Grass
- Field size: 164 m × 128 m (538 ft × 420 ft)
- Public transit: Olympic Park; Special event buses

Construction
- Groundbreaking: May 1996
- Opened: February 1998
- Renovated: 2001
- Expanded: 2012
- Architect: Populous (redevelopment)

Tenants
- Regular Tenants; Sydney Royal Easter Show (1998–present); GWS Giants (AFL) (2012–present); Sydney Thunder (BBL) (2015–present) Past Tenants; Sydney Storm (ABL) (1998–1999); Olympic Games (Baseball/Pentathlon) (2000); Canterbury Bulldogs (NRL) (2001–2005); Western Sydney Wanderers (A-League) (2016–2019); 2019 Sydney Sevens

Website
- www.sydneyshowground.com.au

Ground information
- Country: Australia
- Home club: Sydney Thunder
- Capacity: 24,000

International information
- First women's T20I: 21 February 2020: Australia v India
- Last women's T20I: 3 March 2020: South Africa v West Indies
- As of 7 September 2020; Source: CricketArchive

Sydney Showground Stadium (known under naming rights as ENGIE Stadium) is a sports and events stadium located at the Sydney Olympic Park in Sydney. It is primarily used for Australian rules football and cricket as the home ground of the Greater Western Sydney Giants in the Australian Football League (AFL) and the Sydney Thunder in the Big Bash League (BBL). The stadium also hosts flagship events of the Sydney Royal Easter Show, including the Grand Parade, equestrian competitions, and rodeos. The stadium is operated by the Royal Agricultural Society of NSW (RAS).

The stadium opened in 1998 as the Sydney Showground Main Arena, with a capacity of 21,500. In conjunction with an expansion and upgrade between 2011 and 2012, it was renamed Sydney Showground Stadium and received an updated capacity of 23,500, being reduced to 22,102 during cricket games. Energy retailer Engie have held naming rights to the stadium since 2024.

During the 2000 Summer Olympics, the stadium was renamed to Sydney Baseball Stadium, hosting baseball and the riding and running portions of the modern pentathlon.

== History ==
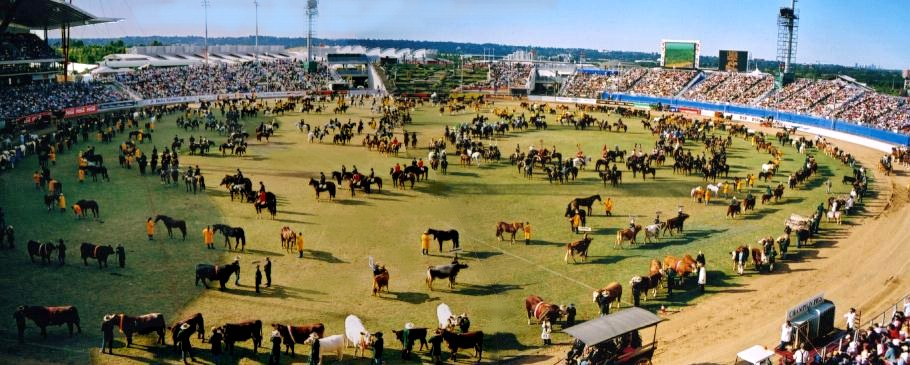
View of the 2001 Sydney Royal Easter Show Grand Parade, showing the Main Arena prior to redevelopment

The stadium was constructed as part of the development of the new Sydney Showground, it was built to replace the aging Showground at Moore Park and to provide a venue for the 2000 Summer Olympics.

A $65 million upgrade of the stadium to accommodate the GWS Giants was announced on 9 June 2010. Jointly funded by the NSW Government, the AFL and the RAS, the upgrade included two new stands which increased seating capacity from 13,000 to 25,000 (the stadium seated 13,000 but its full pre-redevelopment capacity was listed as 21,500), upgraded hospitality facilities, improved audio and sound systems and new media facilities. The playing surface was also reconfigured. The upgrade was officially opened on 23 May 2012.

The RAS is seeking funding from the New South Wales Government to expand the stadium as part of a major upgrade of the Showground precinct. It has targeted a total post-extension capacity of 30,000 seats but is considering revising the target capacity to 35,000 seats.

Following its redevelopment, the venue was known as Škoda Stadium from 2012 until 2013 in a deal with car manufacturer Škoda, then as Spotless Stadium from 2014 until 2018 in a deal with cleaning and catering company Spotless Group Holdings. From 2019 to 2024, it was known as Giants Stadium in a deal with its primary AFL tenant, the Greater Western Sydney Giants, making the club the only one in the league to play in a self-branded venue; the Giants name was stylised in all caps as GIANTS Stadium, consistent with the manner in which the club self-styles its name in all media. In March 2024, the venue became known as Engie Stadium under a three-year naming rights deal with energy company Engie. In May 2024, the original stadium lighting system was replaced with LED lights at a cost of $4 million.

=== Australian rules football ===
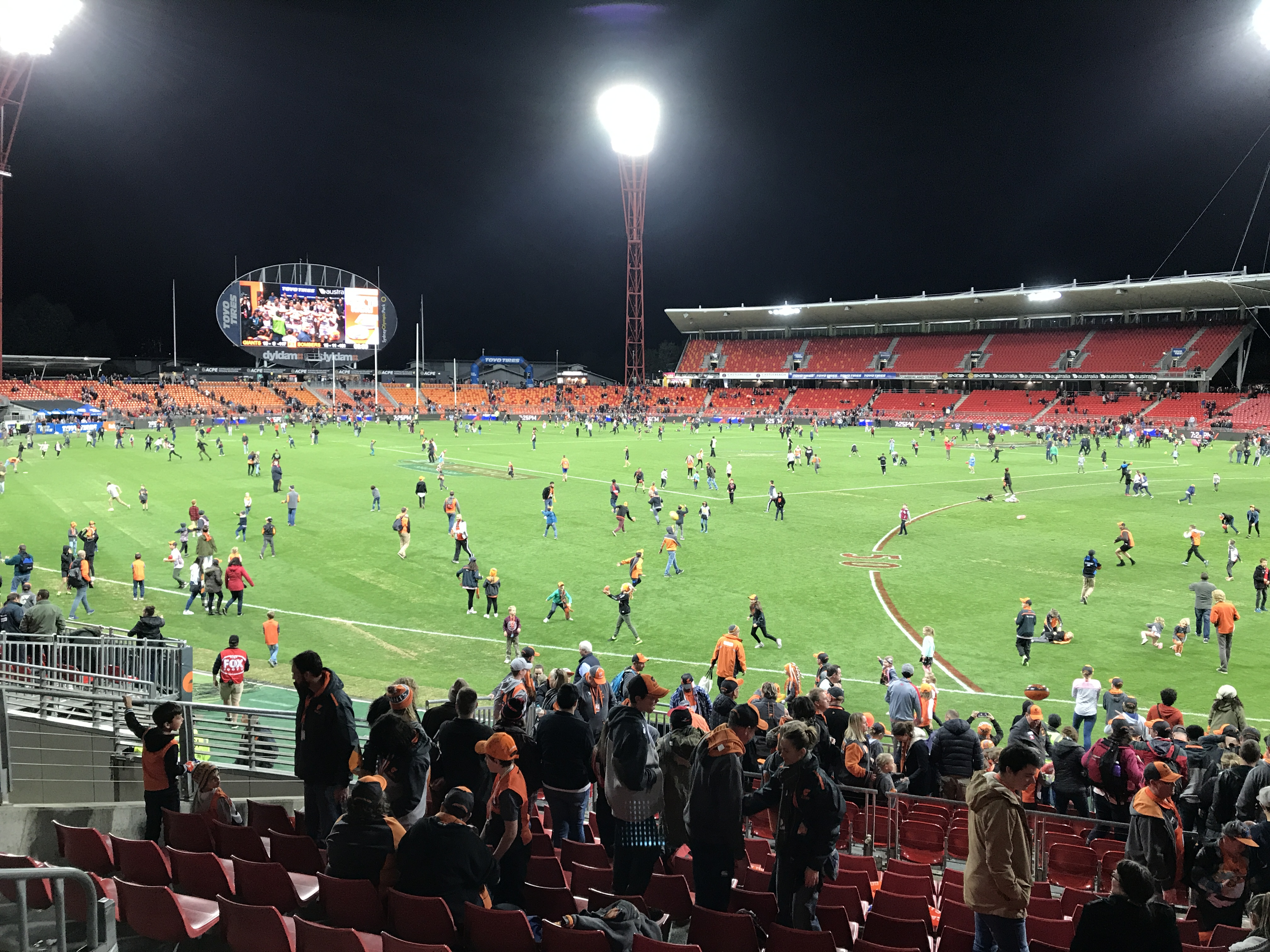
Patrons play on the surface of the stadium after an AFL game

The venue is the primary home ground for The Greater Western Sydney Giants. The club played its first game at the stadium on Saturday, 26 May 2012, Round 9 of the 2012 AFL season. In front of a crowd of 11,887 the Giants lost the match against Essendon by 66 points. The Giants' first win at the stadium occurred on 4 August that year, when they defeated Port Adelaide by 34 points. On 24 September 2016, the ground hosted its first ever AFL finals game with the Giants losing to the Western Bulldogs by six points in a close preliminary final.

=== Cricket ===
The Sydney Thunder played two games at the stadium during the 2014–15 Big Bash League season when ANZ Stadium was unavailable due to the 2015 AFC Asian Cup. In June 2015, the Sydney Thunder announced a 10-year agreement to play all home games at Sydney Showground Stadium until the 2024–25 BBL season.

The opening Sydney Derby of the fifth season (2015–16) of BBL attracted record audience, with more than 1.5 million people tuning in for this match between the Sydney Thunder and the Sydney Sixers. On 28 December 2015, Sydney Thunder defeated Adelaide Strikers at the stadium in front of 21,500 spectators.

The stadium hosted several games of the 2020 ICC Women's T20 World Cup.

=== Baseball and 2000 Olympics ===
The stadium hosted the Sydney Storm in the Australian Baseball League for the 1998 and 1999 championship. During the Olympics, it was known as the Sydney Baseball Stadium and was the main baseball venue. The gold medal game played in front of 14,107 saw the USA, managed by Tommy Lasorda, a former two time World Series winning manager with the Los Angeles Dodgers, defeated defending champions Cuba 4–0 to win their first ever Olympic gold medal in baseball.

Since the Olympics, no other baseball game has been played at the venue. Other Olympic events hosted were the riding and running portion of the modern pentathlon competitions.

=== Rugby league ===
In 2001, the Canterbury Bulldogs of the NRL moved some of their home games to the stadium, playing there until 2005 when they moved to full-time ANZ Stadium. During this period, the ground hosted two finals matches, a 2001 Qualifying Final where the Bulldogs defeated St. George Illawarra Dragons 23-22 in front of 17,975, and a 2003 Qualifying Final where the New Zealand Warriors defeated the Bulldogs 48-22.

=== Soccer ===
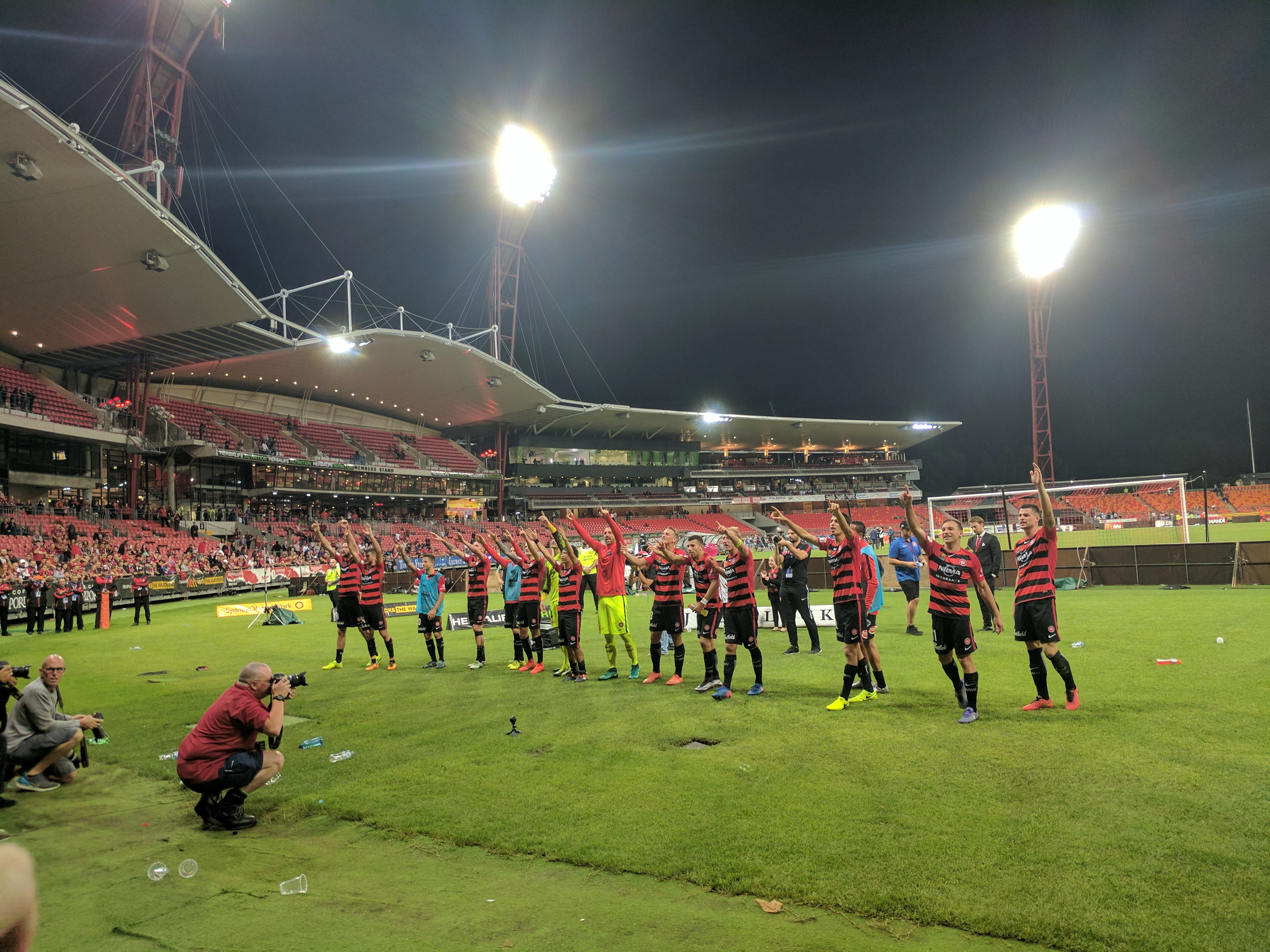
Western Sydney Wanderers celebrating after winning an A-League game

The Western Sydney Wanderers played most of their homes games at the stadium during the 2016–17 A-League season while Parramatta Stadium was rebuilt. Home games against Sydney FC, Melbourne Victory and Perth Glory were played at the nearby ANZ Stadium. The Wanderers played their first home game at the ground on 23 October 2016 against the Newcastle Jets.

=== Rugby sevens ===
The Showground became the new home of Australia's events in the men's and women's versions of the World Rugby Sevens Series effective with the 2018–19 seasons. This change was made because the Sydney Football Stadium, previously host to both events, was to be demolished to make way for a new stadium on the same site.

=== Motorsport ===
As the Showground was originally built for both the Royal Easter Show and as a baseball venue, the field included a 450 metres (490 yards) long track that surrounded the playing field of the Stadium prior to its removal during the 2011–12 redevelopment. In the tradition of the Sydney Showground Speedway at Moore Park which ran speedway from 1926 until 1996, the track was used as a Speedway venue, mostly for motorcycle racing, though with limited success. In 2007 and 2008 the Stadium hosted a round of the Australian Solo Championships, just as the old Showground had done on 21 separate occasions between 1935 and 1980. The 2007 championship round, which was the opening round of a five-round series, was won by Australia's reigning Speedway World Champion Jason Crump, the son of Phil Crump who won the Australian title at the old Showground in 1975. Jason Crump would go on to win his second Aussie title in 2007, winning three of the five rounds (Sydney, Newcastle Showgrounds, and Borderline Speedway in Mount Gambier), while finishing second in Mildura (Olympic Park Speedway) and the Gillman Speedway in Adelaide.

The track, which was tight and narrow (a criticism in common with its predecessor) and almost square in shape, was also used for Speedcar racing, also with little success. When the Speedcars raced at the Showground, a temporary fence was put in place on the inside of the track to protect the grass surface from any out of control cars.

The first speedway meeting at the new Showground was held on 1 May 1999 and included an unofficial Solo "Test" between Australia and the United States, won easily by Australia. The program also featured Sidecars, as well as demonstration runs by restored vintage Speedcars and Modifieds which had raced at the old Showground. The speedway was officially opened by 15 time World Champion Ivan Mauger of New Zealand, and the "King of the Royale" (the old Showground Speedway), four time Australian Solo Champion Jim Airey.

== Configuration ==
In its present configuration, the stadium is a playing field running north east to south west. The south western half is surrounded by a single grandstand structure. Additional stands are located on either side of the field, directly adjacent the main structure. A single video screen is located at the north-eastern end. When it was installed, the screen was the largest at a stadium in the southern hemisphere, The stands are:

Opened 1998:

- Members Stand
- Suttor Stand
- Vincent Fairfax Stand
- Sinclair Stand
- Martin & Angus Stand

Opened 2012:

- Sydney Royal Stand
- Cumberland Stand

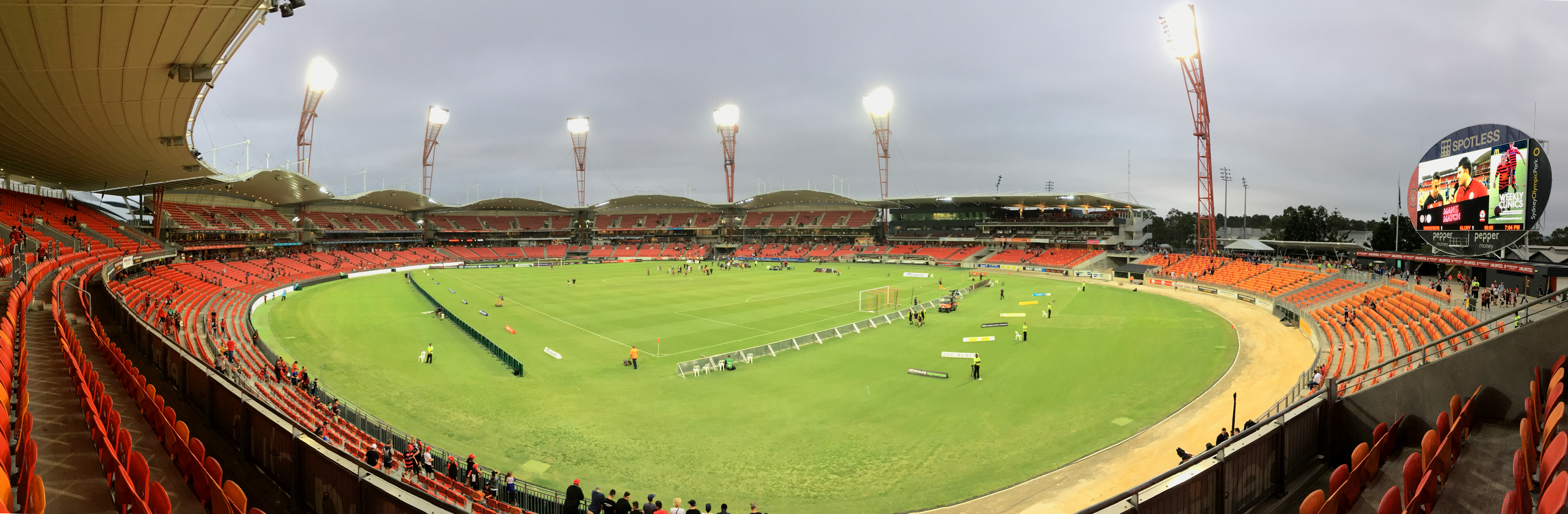
Panoramic view from the Cumberland Stand of the stadium in association football configuration.

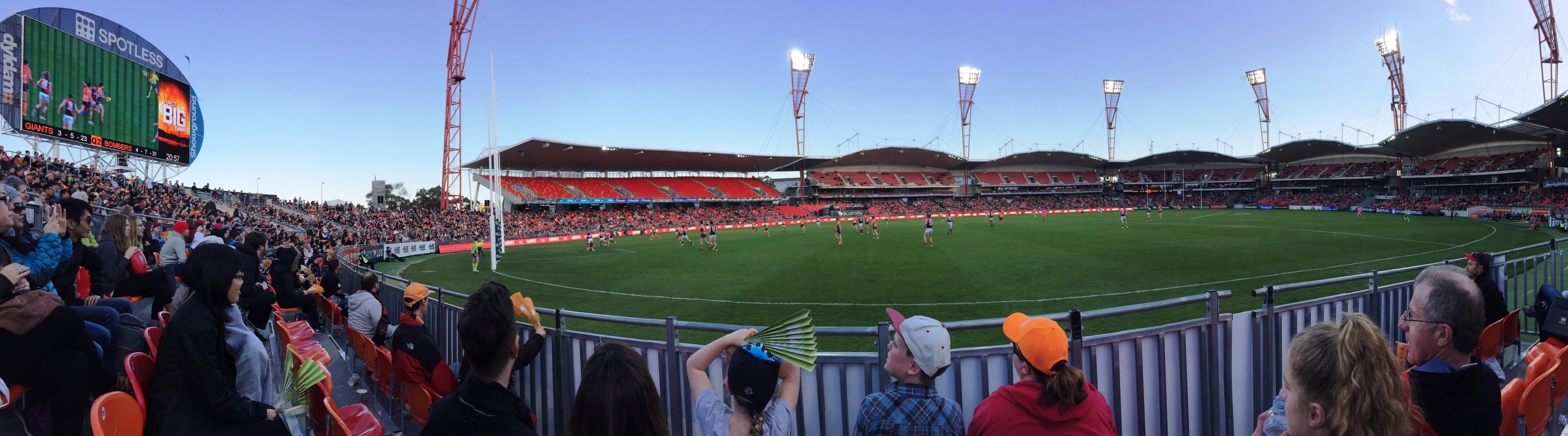
Panoramic view of the stadium for an Australian rules football match.

== AFL records ==
Players

- Most games played: Callan Ward (Western Bulldogs/Greater Western Sydney), Lachie Whitfield (Greater Western Sydney), 75
- Most goals kicked: Jeremy Cameron (Greater Western Sydney/Geelong), 164
- Most goals kicked in a match: Jack Riewoldt (Richmond), 11.2 (68) vs. Greater Western Sydney, 24 May 2014
- Most disposals in a match: Tom Mitchell (Hawthorn), 50 vs. Greater Western Sydney, 30 June 2018

Teams

- Highest score: Adelaide 29.13 (187) defeated Greater Western Sydney 7.10 (52), 12 May 2013
- Lowest score: Gold Coast 4.2 (26) defeated by Greater Western Sydney 20.14 (134), 9 June 2018
- Biggest margin: Adelaide defeated Greater Western Sydney, 135 points, 12 May 2013
- Longest winning streak: Greater Western Sydney (2015–16), 6 games

Last updated: 24 April 2024

== Attendance records ==
=== Top 10 sports attendance records ===
No.	Date	Teams	Sport	Competition	Crowd
1	30 December 2023	Sydney Thunder v. Sydney Sixers	Cricket	2023–24 BBL season	22,102
2	15 July 2017	Greater Western Sydney v. Sydney	Australian football	2017 AFL season	21,924
3	10 August 2001	Canterbury Bulldogs v. Parramatta Eels	Rugby league	2001 NRL season	21,895
4	20 December 2016	Sydney Thunder v. Sydney Sixers	Cricket	2016–17 BBL season	21,798
5	24 September 2016	Greater Western Sydney v. Western Bulldogs	Australian football	2016 AFL finals series	21,790
6	19 December 2017	Sydney Thunder v. Sydney Sixers	Cricket	2017–18 BBL season	21,589
7	12 June 2016	Greater Western Sydney v. Sydney	Australian football	2016 AFL season	21,541
8	28 December 2015	Sydney Thunder v. Adelaide Strikers	Cricket	2015–16 BBL season	21,500
9	18 August 2018	Greater Western Sydney v. Sydney	Australian football	2018 AFL season	21,433
10	9 March 2024	Greater Western Sydney v. Collingwood	Australian football	2024 AFL season	21,235

^{Source: Austadiums (2003 crowds onwards)}

=== Top 5 AFL attendance records ===
No.	Date	Teams	Crowd
1	15 July 2017	Greater Western Sydney v. Sydney	21,924
2	24 September 2016	Greater Western Sydney v. Western Bulldogs	21,790
3	12 June 2016	Greater Western Sydney v. Sydney	21,541
4	18 August 2018	Greater Western Sydney v. Sydney	21,433
5	9 March 2024	Greater Western Sydney v. Collingwood	21,235

^{Source: AFL Tables}

=== Top 5 BBL attendance records ===
No.	Date	Teams	Crowd
1	30 December 2023	Sydney Thunder v. Sydney Sixers	22,102
2	20 December 2016	Sydney Thunder v. Sydney Sixers	21,798
3	19 December 2017	Sydney Thunder v. Sydney Sixers	21,589
4	28 December 2015	Sydney Thunder v. Adelaide Strikers	21,500
5	18 January 2017	Sydney Thunder v. Adelaide Strikers	20,642
6	28 December 2016	Sydney Thunder v. Brisbane Heat	20,234

^{Source Austadiums}

=== Top 5 NRL attendance records ===
No.	Date	Teams	Crowd
1	10 August 2001	Canterbury Bulldogs v. Parramatta Eels	21,895
2	29 August 2003	Canterbury Bulldogs v. Canberra Raiders	20,016
3	16 August 2002	Canterbury Bulldogs v. Parramatta Eels	19,346
4	13 September 2003	Canterbury Bulldogs v. New Zealand Warriors	18,312
5	4 March 2001	Canterbury Bulldogs v. Newcastle Knights	18,109

^{Last updated on 1 January 2017}

== See also ==
- 2000 Summer Olympics venues
- List of sports venues in Australia
