= Sydney County Council =

Australian local government body

- SCC

County Council overview
- Formed: 17 August 1935
- Preceding County Council: Municipal Council of Sydney, Electricity Department
- Dissolved: 2 January 1990, taken over by NSW government
- Superseding County Council: Sydney Electricity
- Jurisdiction: Greater Metropolitan Sydney
- Headquarters: Queen Victoria Building (1935–1968); Sydney County Council Building, 570 George Street, Sydney (1968–1990)

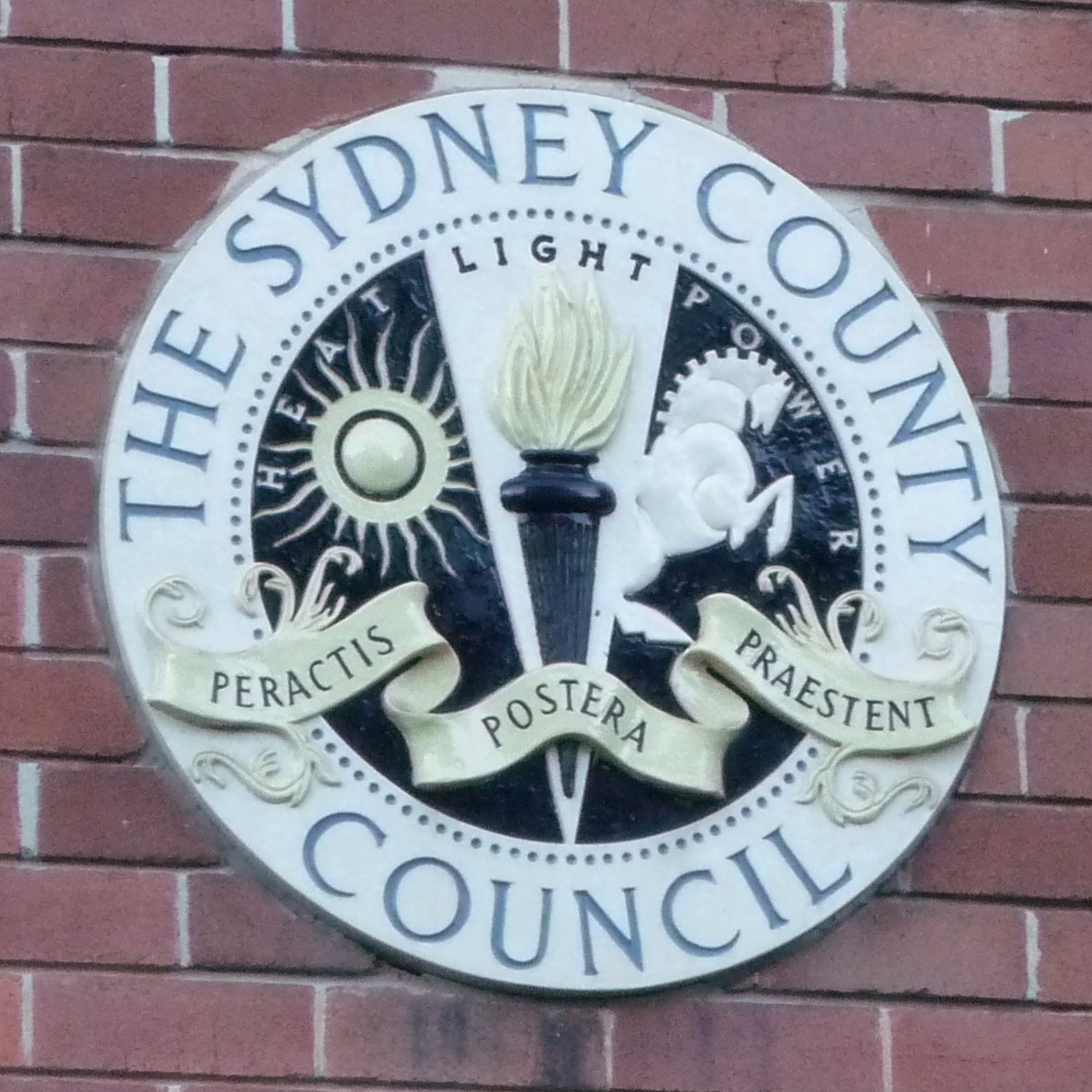
Plaque on exterior wall of The Sydney County Council Bulk Stores building, at 87-103 Epsom Road Rosebery, with its Latin motto, translated as "Let the future excel the past".

The Sydney County Council (SCC) was a county council established in 1935 to produce electricity and operate the electricity network in a number of municipalities in metropolitan Sydney.

SCC was established by the Gas and Electricity Act 1935 but, despite this and special legislative provisions which applied to it, SCC operated as a county council under the Local Government Act 1919. On SCC's establishment, it assumed control of the Electricity Department of the Sydney City Council, which was already supplying electricity to other municipalities. In 1952, the SCC lost most its electricity generation functions to the Electricity Commission of New South Wales (established 1950) and retained only its distribution functions. In 1990, SCC and other county councils were taken over by the NSW government and SCC was succeeded by Sydney Electricity, a state-owned statutory corporation.

== History ==
In 1904, the Municipal Council of Sydney's Electricity Department, one of the two main authorities responsible for electricity generation at the time, began to generate electricity for streetlights in the Sydney central business district. Pyrmont Power Station began operations in 1904, as the Sydney Electric Lighting Station, and was expanded over time. Construction of the Bunnerong Power Station began in 1926, and when Bunnerong 'A' Station was completed in 1937 it had a capacity of 175 MW, making it the largest power station in the State, and further expansion brought its capacity to 375 MW, making Bunnerong the largest power station in the southern hemisphere.

In 1935, the Sydney County Council was formed and took over ownership of the Municipality of Sydney's Electricity Department including its power stations, which by then supplied electricity for domestic, commercial and community uses in addition to the original purpose of supply for street lighting. SCC progressively took over the electricity operations of other local councils in its vicinity. SCC took over the electricity works of Sutherland Shire Council in 1949. After the Electricity Commission of New South Wales was created in 1950 to manage electricity generation and distribution across the state, the SCC's Bunnerong and Pyrmont power stations were transferred to it in 1952; and the SCC became an electricity distributor only. By 1982, Brisbane Water, Mackellar and St George County Councils had merged with SCC.

In 1989, the NSW government legislated to abolish the SCC and other electricity supply county councils formed under the Local Government Act. SCC became Sydney Electricity, a government-owned corporation. County council employees had been entitled to payment for unused accumulated sick leave but the NSW government legislated to prohibit such, leaving the now state-owned corporation with the money. County councils had also been profitable and had significant assets in accounting provisions for equipment renewal and maintenance. The NSW government, as the new owner, required the utility providers to pay it dividends and sought to privatize and sell them. In 1996, Sydney Electricity was merged with Orion Energy to form EnergyAustralia, a government-controlled enterprise. The retail business of EnergyAustralia and its name was sold to Hong-Kong listed TRUenergy in 2010, which in 2012, changed its name to EnergyAustralia. On 2 March 2011, the remaining electricity distribution business of EnergyAustralia changed its name to Ausgrid. The state government subsequently leased ownership of Ausgrid, retaining a stake.

== Areas and offices ==
=== Council areas of responsibility ===
- Sydney (1935–1990)
- Alexandria (1935–1949)
- Annandale (1935–1949)
- Ashfield (1935–1990)
- Auburn (1935–1990)
- Bankstown (1949–1990)
- Botany (1935–1990)
- Burwood (1935–1990)
- Canterbury (1935–1990)
- Concord (1935–1990)
- Darlington (1935–1949)
- Drummoyne (1935–1990)
- Enfield (1935–1949)
- Erskineville (1935–1949)
- The Glebe (1935–1949)
- Gosford (1980–1990)
- Homebush (1935–1947)
- Hornsby (1949–1990)
- Hunter's Hill (1935–1990)
- Hurstville (1980–1990)
- Kogarah (1980–1990)
- Ku-ring-gai (1935–1990)
- Lane Cove (1935–1990)
- Leichhardt (1969–1990)
- Lidcombe (1935–1949)
- Manly (1980–1990)
- Marrickville (1935–1990)
- Mascot (1935–1949)
- Mosman (1935–1990)
- North Sydney (1935–1990)
- Paddington (1935–1949)
- Parramatta (1949–1990)
- Randwick (1935–1990)
- Redfern (1935–1949)
- Rockdale (1969–1990)
- Ryde (1935–1990)
- South Sydney (1968–1982; 1989–1990)
- St Peters (1935–1949)
- Strathfield (1935–1990)
- Sutherland (1949–1990)
- Vaucluse (1935–1949)
- Warringah (1980–1990)
- Waterloo (1935–1949)
- Waverley (1935–1990)
- Willoughby (1935–1990)
- Woollahra (1935–1990)
- Wyong (1980–1990)

=== SCC Offices ===
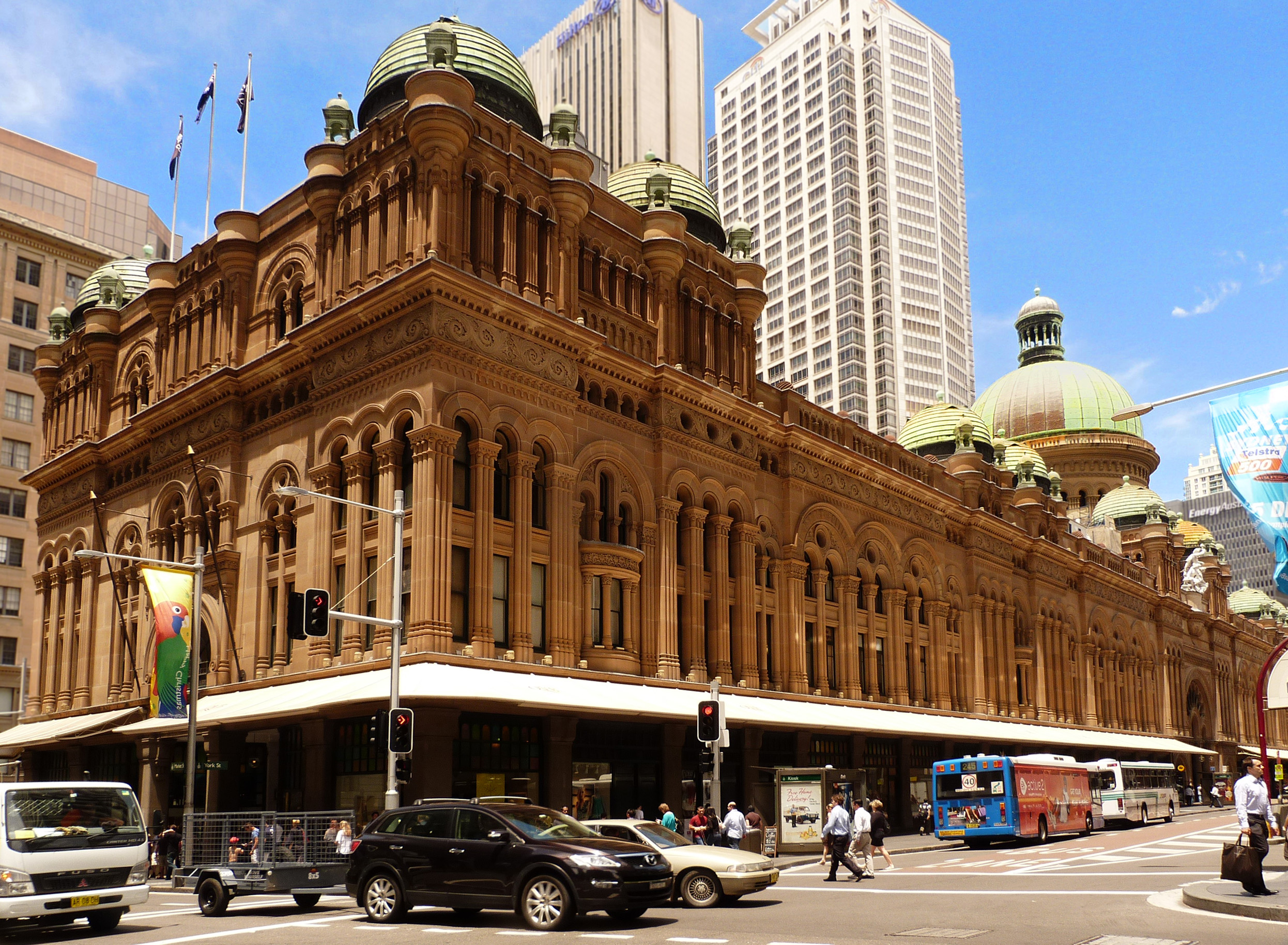
Queen Victoria Building on George Street

==== Queen Victoria Building, 1935–1968 ====
On 13 December 1935, the Minister for Local Government, Eric Spooner, officially opened the new offices of the Sydney County Council within the Queen Victoria Building on George Street, Sydney, marking the transfer of responsibility from the Electricity Department of the City of Sydney. The redesign of a substantial portion of the Victorian building in the distinctive Art Deco style was undertaken by the Architect's Branch of the City of Sydney, with the primary contractor being Beat Brothers and various fittings supplied by Wunderlich. The works included a demonstration hall, executive offices, electricity showrooms and general offices for County Council staff.

However, the QVB remained under the overall ownership and control of the City of Sydney, with various proposals emerging over subsequent years over the redevelopment of the site and/or its sale to the County Council, which rented its premises from the City Council. By 1945, the present amount of office space was recognised as inadequate for the SCC's needs, and the council authorised the general manager to investigate the possibilities of a new office or substantially remodelling the QVB.

==== SCC Building, 570 George Street, 1968–1990 ====
No further action was taken until 1957 when the County Council began acquiring sites on the corner of George and Bathurst streets (552A-570 George Street) for the site of a new headquarters building. With acquisitions underway, in 1959 the County Council staged a design competition for the new headquarters, to be judged by an eminent committee of architects, including Max Collard, George Molnar and Walter Osborn McCutcheon. The competition, which closed on 2 May 1960 and attracted 62 entrants, specified that the building had to have "an efficient flexible plan, large areas of open space with a minimum of solid or high partitions, minimum maintenance and operational costs, and a high architectural standard imparting civic dignity consistent with the importance of the site."

The first prize of £5,000 was awarded to a design from prominent Sydney firm Fowell, Mansfield & Maclurcan, with the design attributed to James Kell and Diana Parrott, with input from partner Osmond Jarvis. The winning design took the form of a tall slab block rising above the southern end of a low podium, recalling the seminal modernist International style design of Skidmore, Owings & Merrill’s Lever House in New York completed in 1952. Second prize was awarded to Stephenson & Turner of North Sydney, and the third prize went to Marcus Woodforde. However, when discovering that the headquarters project would cost up £4.5 million, the council voted in August 1961 to abandon the project. In June 1963, the council voted again to restart the aborted headquarters project and re-engaged Fowell, Mansfield, Jarvis & Maclurcan to finalise the design. Site excavation by builders E. A. Watts Pty Ltd began in February 1965 and construction was completed by early 1968, being officially opened by the Governor of NSW, Sir Roden Cutler, on 5 April 1968.

The building, completed at a cost of $9,300,000, at a height of 96.9 metres and 27 storeys with 200,000 square feet of office space to house 1,550 of the SCC's 7,000 staff. The dark exterior of the building contrasted greatly with the nearby QVB, St Andrews Cathedral and Sydney Town Hall, and was achieved by polished black granite cladding, with cladding at the ground floor level lined with marble. The new SCC Building remained the council's primary headquarters until its abolition in 1990. The NSW Government sold the building in 2013–2014.

=== Other offices and locations ===
- Testing Laboratory and Northern Depot, 14 Nelson Street and Mowbray Road, Chatswood (1954–1990).
- Central Bulk Stores Building, 87-103 Epsom Road, Rosebery (1956–1990)
- Crows Nest Showroom, 326 Pacific Highway
- Burwood Showroom, 208 Burwood Road
- Campsie Showroom, 257 Beamish Street
- Bondi Junction Showroom, 149 Oxford Street
- Gosford Office, 50 Mann Street Gosford (former Brisbane Water County Council headquarters).
- Manly Office, 48-52 Sydney Road Manly (former Mackellar County Council headquarters)

== Badge and motto ==
In 1936 the new Council adopted a badge for general use and on the Common Seal. A competition was conducted both among staff and the general public, with the final design chosen including the sun to depict heat, the classical torch to depict light and the figure of the horse to depict power. However the original motto of this design, the Latin "Imperium in populo ex populo" ("Power from the people to give the people power"), was not considered a well-constructed Latin phrase by experts, and Professor Frederick Augustus Todd, Professor of Latin and Dean of the Faculty of Arts of the University of Sydney (1930–1937), suggested instead that the motto be "Peractis Postera Praestent" ("Let the future excel the past"). This was accepted by the Council at its 1 September 1936 meeting, with the SCC General Manager, Forbes Mackay, noting: "I consider this motto suitably expresses what I believe to be the aim of the council: to give increasingly better service to the public that it serves."

== Chairmen ==
Years	Name	Council	Notes
28 August 1935 – 19 January 1937	Stan Lloyd	Enfield	
19 January 1937 – 19 January 1938	Arthur McElhone	Sydney	
24 January 1938 – 17 January 1939	Harry Gardiner	Redfern	
17 January 1939 – 23 January 1940	Stanley Parry	Canterbury	
23 January 1940 – 21 January 1941	Ernest Tresidder	Sydney	
21 January 1941 – 20 January 1942	Stanley Parry	Canterbury	
20 January 1942 – 19 January 1943	William Neville Harding	Sydney	
19 January 1943 – 23 January 1945	Stanley Parry	Canterbury	
23 January 1945 – 15 January 1946	Arthur McElhone	Sydney	
15 January 1946 – 14 January 1947	John Cramer	North Sydney	
14 January 1947 – 20 January 1948	Frank Grenville Pursell	Sydney	
20 January 1948 – 24 January 1950	John Cramer	North Sydney	
24 January 1950 – 7 January 1952	William Parker Henson	Sydney	
7 January 1952 – 12 January 1953	Pat Hills	Sydney	
12 January 1953 – 29 January 1954	Reginald Arthur Triggs	Strathfield	
29 January 1954 – 10 January 1955	Harry Jensen	Randwick	
10 January 1955 – 9 January 1956	Frank Green	Sydney	
9 January 1956 – 29 January 1957	Norman Grant Crook	Auburn	
29 January 1957 – 28 January 1958	Frank Joyce	Botany	
28 January 1958 – 27 January 1959	Ernest Charles O'Dea	Sydney	
27 January 1959 – 16 January 1961	William Murray	Marrickville	
16 January 1961 – 15 January 1962	William Charles Doherty	Sydney	
15 January 1962 – 23 January 1963	Gordon Raymond Ibbett	Sydney	
29 January 1963 – 26 January 1966	John Armstrong	Sydney	
1 February 1966 – 10 February 1969	Kath Anderson	Botany	
10 February 1969 – November 1970	George Ivan Ferris	Mosman	
November 1970 – 10 November 1971	John Shaw	Sydney	
29 November 1971 – November 1974	George Ivan Ferris	Mosman	
November 1974 – 25 November 1975	Stanley Lewis Hedges	Auburn	
24 November 1975 – 21 November 1977	Innes Stanley Haviland	North Sydney	
21 November 1977 – 20 November 1978	Sir Emmet McDermott	Sydney	
20 November 1978 – 5 November 1979	Douglas Burleigh Carruthers	Bankstown	
5 November 1979 – 17 November 1980	Michael Keith Fosbery Bray	Woollahra	
17 November 1980 – November 1981	Kath Anderson	Botany	
November 1981 – November 1983	Peter Clement Lewis	Sutherland	
November 1983 – November 1984	Noel Reidy	Willoughby	
November 1984 – November 1985	Ivan Petch	Ryde	
November 1985 – November 1987	George Francis Moore	Rockdale	
November 1987 – November 1988	Kevin Hill	Bankstown	
November 1988 – 2 January 1990	Michael Keith Fosbery Bray	Woollahra	

== Council elections and composition ==
Section 7F(8) of the Electricity Act, 1945 provided that:

"A person is eligible to be elected as a delegate to the Sydney County Council if the person is a member of a council of an area included in the Sydney County District or is eligible to be elected as an alderman or councillor of such an area."

=== 17 August 1935 Election ===
Constituency	Councillor	Notes
1st (Note: Two Councillors elected from the City of Sydney)	Arthur Joseph McElhone	Sydney
1st	Ernest Charles O'Dea (ALP)	Sydney
2nd (Note: Two Councillors elected from the Municipalities of Alexandria, Annandale, Auburn, Botany, Burwood, Canterbury, Concord, Darlington, Drummoyne, Enfield, Erskineville, The Glebe, Homebush, Lidcombe. Marrickville, Mascot, Paddington, Randwick, Redfern, St Peters, Strathfield, Vaucluse, Waterloo, Waverley and Woollahra)	John Henry Gardiner (ALP)	Redfern
2nd	Stanley Allan Lloyd	Enfield
3rd (Note: One Councillor elected from the Municipalities of Hunter's Hill, Ku-ring-gai, Lane Cove, Mosman, North Sydney, Ryde and Willoughby)	John Oscar Cramer	North Sydney

=== 19 January 1938 Election ===
Constituency	Councillor	Notes
1st	William Neville Harding	Sydney
1st	Ernest Philip Tresidder	Sydney
2nd	John Henry Gardiner (ALP)	Redfern
2nd	Stanley Evan Parry	Canterbury
3rd	John Oscar Cramer	North Sydney

=== 14 January 1942 Election ===
Constituency	Councillor	Notes
1st	William Neville Harding	Sydney
1st	Arthur Joseph McElhone	Sydney
2nd	Gordon Andrew Byrne	Auburn
2nd	Stanley Evan Parry	Canterbury
3rd	John Oscar Cramer	North Sydney

=== 9 January 1945 Election ===
Constituency	Councillor	Notes
1st	Reginald James Bartley	Sydney
1st	Arthur Joseph McElhone	Sydney
2nd	Gordon Andrew Byrne	Auburn
2nd	Stanley Evan Parry	Canterbury
3rd	John Oscar Cramer	North Sydney

14 February 1946 1st Constituency by-election

On 15 January 1946, Councillor Reginald James Bartley resigned his seat. A by-election was held for the resulting vacancy on the 1st Constituency on 14 February 1946, at which Frank Grenville Pursell (Sydney) was elected unopposed.

19 July 1946 1st Constituency by-election

On 17 June 1946, Councillor and Deputy Chairman Arthur Joseph McElhone died in office. A by-election was held for the resulting vacancy on the 1st Constituency on 19 July 1946, at which William Parker Henson (Sydney) was elected. On 30 July 1946, Councillor Frank Grenville Pursell was elected as deputy chairman.

10 September 1947 2nd Constituency by-election

On 12 August 1947, Councillor Stanley Evan Parry resigned his seat due to ill-health. A by-election was held for the resulting vacancy on the 2nd Constituency on 10 September 1947, at which John Henry Gardiner (Redfern) was elected.

=== 9 February 1949 Election ===
Constituency	Councillor	Notes
1st (Note: Three Councillors elected from the City of Sydney)	Joseph Anthony Bodkin (ALP)	Sydney
1st	Patrick Darcy Hills (ALP)	Sydney
1st	Daniel Patrick Minogue (ALP)	Sydney
2nd (Note: Two Councillors elected from the City of Bankstown and the municipalities of Ashfield, Auburn, Burwood, Canterbury, Concord, Drummoyne and Strathfield)	Colin Biggers	Burwood
2nd	Adam Kemball Dein	Marrickville
3rd (Note: Two Councillors elected from the municipalities of Randwick, Waverley, Woollahra, and Sutherland Shire)	Reginald William Bieler	Randwick
3rd	Thomas Hogan	Waverley
4th (Note: Two Councillors elected from the municipalities of Hunters Hill, Ku-ring-gai, Lane Cove, Mosman, North Sydney, Ryde, Willoughby, City of Parramatta, and Hornsby Shire)	John Oscar Cramer	North Sydney
4th	William Parker Henson	Parramatta

1 May 1950 1st Constituency by-election

On 18 March 1950, Councillor Joseph Anthony Bodkin died in office. Councillor Daniel Patrick Minogue also resigned his seat. A by-election was held for the two resulting vacancies on the 1st Constituency on 1 May 1950, at which Frank Green (Sydney) and Reginald Arthur Triggs (Strathfield) were elected.

=== 17 January 1951 Election ===
Constituency	Councillor	Notes
1st	Frank Green (ALP)	Sydney
1st	Patrick Darcy Hills (ALP)	Sydney
1st	Reginald Arthur Triggs (ALP)	Strathfield
2nd	Colin Biggers	Burwood
2nd	Norman Grant Crook	Auburn
3rd	Henry Frederick Jensen (ALP)	Randwick
3rd	Francis Bernard Joyce (ALP)	Botany
4th	John Oscar Cramer	North Sydney
4th	William Parker Henson	Parramatta

=== 22 January 1954 Election ===
Constituency	Councillor	Notes
1st	Frank Green (ALP)	Sydney
1st	Ernest Charles O'Dea (ALP)	Sydney
1st	Reginald Arthur Triggs (ALP)	Strathfield
2nd	Colin Biggers	Burwood
2nd	Norman Grant Crook	Auburn
3rd	Henry Frederick Jensen (ALP)	Randwick
3rd	Francis Bernard Joyce (ALP)	Botany
4th	John Oscar Cramer	North Sydney
4th	William Parker Henson	Parramatta

7 May 1954 2nd Constituency by-election

On 2 April 1954, Councillor Colin Biggers resigned from office. A by-election was held for his seat on the 2nd Constituency on 7 May 1954, at which Herbert Reuben Thorncraft (Canterbury) was elected.

9 March 1956 4th Constituency by-election

On 23 January 1956, Councillor John Oscar Cramer resigned from office. A by-election was held for his seat on the 4th Constituency on 9 March 1956, at which George Ivan Ferris (Mosman) was elected.

=== 23 January 1957 Election ===
Constituency	Councillor	Notes
1st	Ambrose James Cahill (ALP)	Sydney
1st	Robert Manning (ALP)	Sydney
1st	Ernest Charles O'Dea (ALP)	Sydney
2nd	William Thomas Murray (ALP)	Marrickville
2nd	Norman Grant Crook	Auburn
3rd	Lionel Frost Bowen (ALP)	Randwick
3rd	Francis Bernard Joyce (ALP)	Botany
4th	George Ivan Ferris	Mosman
4th	William Parker Henson	Parramatta

=== 20 January 1960 Election ===
Constituency	Councillor	Notes
1st	William Charles Doherty (ALP)	Sydney
1st	Gordon Raymond Ibbett (ALP)	Sydney
1st	Thomas Irving Morey (ALP)	Sydney
2nd	William Thomas Murray (ALP)	Marrickville
2nd	John Hammond Walshaw (ALP)	Bankstown
3rd	Lionel Frost Bowen (ALP)	Randwick
3rd	Francis Bernard Joyce (ALP)	Botany
4th	George Ivan Ferris	Mosman
4th	William Parker Henson	Parramatta

=== 23 January 1963 Election ===
Constituency	Councillor	Notes
1st	Kathleen Harris Anderson (ALP)	Sydney
1st	John Ignatius Armstrong (ALP)	Sydney
1st	Reginald Arthur Triggs (ALP)	Strathfield
2nd	William Thomas Murray (ALP)	Marrickville
2nd	Leo Michael Newton (ALP)	Leichhardt
3rd	George Nicholas Elias Dan	Randwick
3rd	Samuel Stuart Morton Harrison	Woollahra
4th	George Ivan Ferris	Mosman
4th	William Parker Henson	Parramatta

23 December 1964 3rd Constituency by-election

On 10 November 1964, Councillor George Nicholas Elias Dan died in office. A by-election was held for his seat on the 3rd Constituency on 23 December 1964, at which Keith Bates (Sutherland) was elected.

=== 26 January 1966 Election ===
Constituency	Councillor	Notes
1st	Kathleen Harris Anderson (ALP)	Sydney
1st	Keith Joseph Murphy (ALP)	Marrickville
1st	Reginald Arthur Triggs (ALP)	Strathfield
2nd	William Thomas Murray (ALP)	Marrickville
2nd	Leo Michael Newton (ALP)	Leichhardt
3rd	Maxwell Elliot Lawrence	Woollahra
3rd	William Henry Haigh (ALP)	Randwick
4th	George Ivan Ferris	Mosman
4th	William Parker Henson	Parramatta

=== 6 February 1969 Election ===
Constituency	Councillor	Notes
1st (Note: One Councillor elected from the City of Sydney)	John Alexander Lachlan Shaw	Sydney
2nd	Douglas Burleigh Carruthers	Strathfield
2nd	Stanley Lewis Hedges	Auburn
3rd	Maxwell Elliot Lawrence	Woollahra
3rd	Adrian Charles Molloy	Randwick
4th	George Ivan Ferris	Mosman
4th	William Parker Henson	Parramatta
5th (Note: Two Councillors elected from the municipalities of Botany, Leichhardt, Marrickville, Rockdale and South Sydney)	Kathleen Harris Anderson (ALP)	Botany
5th	Reginald Arthur Triggs	Strathfield

=== 10 November 1971 Election ===
Constituency	Councillor	Notes
1st	Lynn Arnold	Sydney
2nd	Stanley Lewis Hedges	Auburn
2nd	Douglas Burleigh Carruthers	Strathfield
3rd	John Francis Ford (ALP)	Randwick
3rd	Raymond Ambrose Farrelly (ALP)	Waverley
4th	George Ivan Ferris	Mosman
4th	Innes Stanley Haviland	North Sydney
5th	Kathleen Harris Anderson (ALP)	Botany
5th	James Leslie McMahon (ALP)	Leichhardt

=== 6 November 1974 Election ===
Constituency	Councillor	Notes
1st	Lawrence Emmet McDermott	Sydney
2nd	Douglas Burleigh Carruthers	Strathfield
2nd	Stanley Lewis Hedges	Auburn
3rd	Michael Keith Fosbery Bray	Woollahra
3rd	Peter Clement Lewis	Sutherland
4th	Innes Stanley Haviland	North Sydney
4th	John Cyril Moon	Hunters Hill
5th	Kathleen Harris Anderson (ALP)	Botany
5th	James Leslie McMahon (ALP)	Leichhardt

=== 9 November 1977 Election ===
Constituency	Councillor	Notes
1st	Lawrence Emmet McDermott	Sydney
2nd	Stanley Lewis Hedges	Auburn
2nd	Douglas Burleigh Carruthers	Strathfield
3rd	Michael Keith Fosbery Bray	Woollahra
3rd	Peter Clement Lewis	Sutherland
4th	Innes Stanley Haviland	North Sydney
4th	John Cossar Merrington	Hunters Hill
5th	Kathleen Harris Anderson (ALP)	Botany
5th	John William MacBean (ALP)	South Sydney

=== 5 November 1980 Election ===
Constituency	Councillor	Notes
1st	Jack Calpis (ALP)	Sydney
2nd	John Murray (ALP)	Drummoyne
2nd	John Gorrie (ALP)	Canterbury
3rd	Michael Keith Fosbery Bray	Woollahra
3rd	Peter Clement Lewis	Sutherland
4th (Note: Two Councillors elected from the municipalities of Hunters Hill, Ku-ring-gai, Lane Cove, Mosman, North Sydney, Ryde, Willoughby, and Hornsby Shire)	Noel Aloysius Reidy	Willoughby
4th	Ivan Petch	Ryde
5th (Note: Two Councillors elected from the municipalities of Botany, Leichhardt and Marrickville)	Kathleen Harris Anderson (ALP)	Botany
5th	Leslie Rodwell	Leichhardt
6th (Note: Three Councillors elected from the municipalities of Hurstville, Kogarah and Rockdale)	George Francis Moore	Rockdale
6th	Philip Lang	Kogarah
6th	Noel Vincent Bergin	Hurstville
7th (Note: Two Councillors elected from the Municipality of Manly and Warringah Shire)	William Manning	Manly
7th	Thomas Bamborough (ALP)	Warringah
8th (Note: Two Councillors elected from the City of Gosford and Wyong Shire)	Reginald Tarbox (ALP)	Gosford
8th	Dennis Swadling (ALP)	Gosford

=== 6 June 1984 Election ===
Constituency	Councillor	Notes
1st	Jack Calpis	Sydney
2nd	Kevin Herbert Hill	Bankstown
2nd	Erling Harold Calver	Ashfield
3rd	Michael Keith Fosbery Bray	Woollahra
3rd	Peter Clement Lewis	Sutherland
4th	Noel Aloysius Reidy	Willoughby
4th	Ivan Petch	Ryde
5th	Kathleen Harris Anderson (ALP)	Botany
5th	Brian Joseph Thompson	Leichhardt
6th	George Francis Moore	Rockdale
6th	Philip Lang	Kogarah
6th	Noel Vincent Bergin	Hurstville
7th	Frank Michael Beckman	Warringah
7th	Mervyn Paine	Manly
8th	Robert Bell	Gosford
8th	Francis Norman Farrell	Wyong

=== 25 November 1987 Election ===
Constituency	Councillor	Notes
1st	Sir Eric Neal	Sydney
2nd	Kevin Herbert Hill	Bankstown
2nd	Michael Cantali	Drummoyne
3rd	Michael Keith Fosbery Bray	Woollahra
3rd	Peter Clement Lewis	Sutherland
4th	Michael Lardelli	Ryde
4th	Noel Aloysius Reidy	Willoughby
5th	Kathleen Harris Anderson	Botany
5th	Brian Joseph Thompson	Leichhardt
6th	George Francis Moore	Rockdale
6th	Noel Vincent Bergin	Hurstville
6th	Leslie Maxwell Jarman	Kogarah
7th	Frank Michael Beckman	Warringah
7th	Mervyn Paine	Manly
8th	Francis Norman Farrell	Wyong
8th	Derek Brian O'Connor	Gosford

== General Managers ==
The General Manager's suite in the Queen Victoria Building, 1937. The office was panelled in Queensland Walnut (Endiandra palmerstonii) supplied by Beale & Company.

#	Name	Years	Notes
1	Hugh Rose Forbes Mackay	17 August 1935 – 6 October 1939	
2	Roger Vine Hall	7 October 1939 – 6 April 1944	
3	David John Nolan	7 April 1944 – 27 May 1946	
4	Gwynne Stuart Boyd	27 May 1946 – 24 August 1950	
5	Charles James Craggs	25 August 1950 – 30 September 1953	
6	Cyril Eric Ranger	1 October 1953 – 7 June 1965	
7	G. Washington	8 June 1965 – 1970	
8	Robert W. Mitchell	1970 – 10 May 1979	
9	Frederick Rainbird	10 May 1979 – December 1987	
10	Donald K. Gray	December 1987 – 2 January 1990	
