= Alfred Parker (mayor) =

Australian politician and lord mayor (1875–1935)

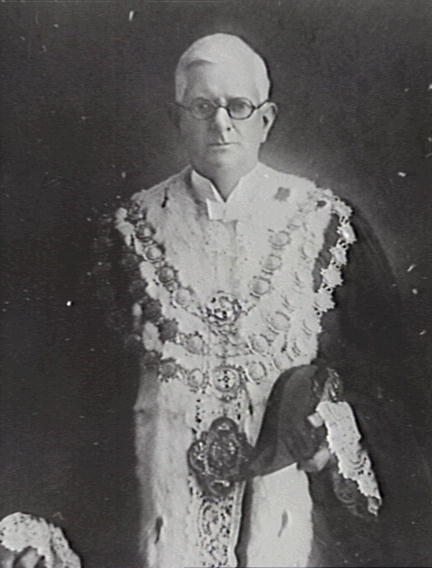
- Lord Mayor, 1934

60th Lord Mayor of Sydney
- In office 1 January 1934 – 18 October 1935
- Deputy: Arthur McElhone
- Preceded by: Richard Hagon
- Succeeded by: Arthur McElhone
- Constituency: Gipps Ward

Personal details
- Born: Alfred Livingstone Parker; 19 February 1875 Balmain, New South Wales, Australia
- Died: 18 October 1935 (aged 60) Waitara, New South Wales, Australia
- Party: Civic Reform Association

Sir Alfred Livingstone Parker (19 February 1875 – 18 August 1935) was a New South Wales politician who served as the Lord Mayor of Sydney between 1934 and 1935. He was first an Alderman in the Hornsby Shire Council and was later elected as an Alderman in the City of Sydney Council, serving from 1930 to his death in 1935.

== Early life ==
Parker was born in the Sydney suburb of Balmain in 1875 to William and Lucy Parker. He was educated at Fort Street High School in Petersham and later at the University of Sydney.

== Legal career ==
After his education at the University of Sydney, Parker became an articled clerk under Thomas Burton Dibbs, son of Thomas Allwright Dibbs, whom he would later work with as a senior partner in the firm Dibbs, Parker and Parker. He became a solicitor of the Supreme Court of New South Wales in 1902 and was appointed Notary Public by the Archbishop of Canterbury in 1934.

== Political career ==
Parker's career in local politics began with a position as Alderman on the Hornsby Shire Council from 1923 to 1930.

He was elected as an Alderman of the City of Sydney council in 1930, holding various positions, including Vice-Chairman of the Health and by-laws Committee in 1930 and Vice-Chairman of the Finance Committee in 1931. In 1934, he was elected Lord Mayor and presided over the council during the visit of the Duke of Gloucester, who would later serve as the Governor-General of Australia.

He was awarded a Knight Bachelor on the occasion of the King's Silver Jubilee.

Parker died at his home in Waitara, New South Wales on 18 October 1935. He was given a State Funeral at St John's Church of England, Gordon.
