= Engie Australia =

Australian electricity and natural gas company

ENGIE
- Industry: Energy
- Founded: 2005
- Headquarters: Melbourne, Victoria, Australia
- Products: Energy retailer
- Parent: Engie
- Website: engie.com.au

Engie Australia (stylised as ENGIE), is an Australian energy retailer, providing electricity and gas to more than 700,000 accounts across Victoria, South Australia, New South Wales, Queensland and Western Australia, with sales totalling 12% of the Australian market. It is the Australian retail arm of French company ENGIE.

ENGIE is a world leader in renewable energy production, flexible power generation solutions and gas and electricity supply to residential and business customers across multiple states. In March 2025, Shannon Hyde was appointed Chief Executive Officer (CEO), succeeding Rik De Buyserie; the company also confirmed that its retail subsidiary, Simply Energy, had been rebranded to ENGIE.

== Leadership ==
On 31 March 2025, ENGIE announced the appointment of Shannon Hyde as CEO for Australia. The Executive Leadership Team (ELT) is made up of local and international leaders with a wealth of experience in the energy industry.

== Products and services ==
Engie Australia provides electricity and gas to homes and businesses in Victoria, New South Wales, South Australia, Queensland and Western Australia.

== History ==
In 2005, the EA-IPR Retail Partnership was launched as a retail brand by International Power in a partnership with New South Wales state-owned enterprise EnergyAustralia, and the partnership operated in the electricity and gas retail and wholesale markets of Victoria and South Australia.

In August 2007, International Power completed a buy out of the partnership. Subsequently, International Power launched the retail brand as Simply Energy in those two states.

Between 2010 and 2012, International Power was progressively acquired by French company GDF Suez, with the French Government having control of the entity and its subsidiaries, including Simply Energy. GDF Suez changed its name to ENGIE in 2015. The Simply Energy brand was subsequently phased out in favour of its parent company's Engie branding about a decade later in 2024.

== Operations and Assets ==
Renewable and Flexible Energy Generation

ENGIE produces and stores low-carbon and flexible energy. Specifically, it develops, builds, and operates renewable and thermal assets, and storage projects.

ENGIE operates the Pelican Point Power Station in South Australia. In 2025, ENGIE partnered with GE Vernova to integrate Advanced Extendor Valve (AEV) technology into gas turbines at Pelican Point to enhance operational flexibility.

In November–December 2025, construction commenced on a co‑located grid‑forming battery energy storage system (BESS) adjacent to the Pelican Point power station, sized at 200 MW / 400 MWh. and it is expected to begin operation in the second half of 2027.

Wind

ENGIE’s 46 MW Canunda Wind Farm in South Australia marked its 20th anniversary in 2025. Following a life‑extension assessment with turbine manufacturer Vestas, ENGIE extended the wind farm’s operational life by ten years to 2035.

The Willogoleche Wind Farm, also in South Australia, was commissioned by ENGIE in 2019 and has a maximum capacity of 119MW. The proposed Willogoleche 2 Wind Farm is intended to sit adjacent to the existing site and could produce up to 110MW.

Solar

The Goorambat East Solar Farm (near Benalla, Victoria) is under construction and is planned to deliver up to 250 MW of capacity across approximately 500,000 photovoltaic panels on a 630‑hectare site. Construction commenced in late 2024 with commissioning and energisation milestones progressing through 2025–2026.

Battery Energy Storage (BESS)

The Hazelwood BESS, located on the site of the former coal mine, can store up to 150 MWh of energy - equivalent to an hour of energy generation from the rooftop solar systems of 30,000 homes. ENGIE is also pursuing opportunities to develop a BESS at Pelican Point in SA.

Supply and Energy Management

ENGIE Global Energy Management & Sales offer a wide range of solutions from energy supply to risk management. Their B2B team supply energy and risk management solutions to large commercial customers.

ENGIE has expanded the use of “virtual battery” offtake agreements to hedge load and support firming services. In May 2025, ENGIE Global Energy Management & Sales signed a virtual PPA for the 270 MW / 540 MWh Stage 1 of Neoen’s Western Downs Battery (Queensland). Later in December 2025, Neoen announced additional virtual battery contracts with ENGIE tied to Stage 2 and planned Stage 3, further increasing ENGIE’s contracted virtual storage capacity.

== Retail and Customer Service ==
ENGIE retails electricity and gas across several Australian states. In Q1 2025, the Australian Customer Experience Professionals Association (ACXPA) ranked ENGIE first nationally for overall call‑centre customer experience and reported ENGIE among the fastest average call wait times across assessed energy retailers.

== Hazelwood Rehabilitation Project ==
ENGIE is rehabilitating the former Hazelwood Mine and Power station to deliver a safe, stable and non-polluting site that enables productive future uses.

Key points:

- The first project of its kind in Australia.
- Located in the Latrobe Valley in Victoria, near the town of Morwell.
- 4,000 hectare site.
- Remains a major employer in the region, with the majority living in local areas.
- The project is being assessed through an Environment Effect Statement (EES).

== Awards and Recognition ==
In October 2025, ENGIE was recognised by Canstar with “Outstanding Value” awards for both electricity plans and solar electricity plans in South Australia.

In the 2025 Finder Customer Satisfaction Awards, ENGIE received state‑level recognition for gas retailing in Western Australia, including “Most Loved” and reliability commendations.

ENGIE also received WeMoney’s “Business Energy Provider of the Year 2025”, and state accolades for “Best for Value” in South Australia (gas) and Queensland (electricity).

== Naming rights deal ==
Under a three-year naming rights deal since March 2024, Engie Australia secured the naming rights of the Sydney Showground Stadium, with the stadium renamed ENGIE Stadium.
