= EnergyAustralia (state government enterprise) =

Former New South Wales, Australia agency

- Type: State–owned enterprise
- Industry: Public utility
- Predecessor: Sydney Electricity; Orion Energy
- Founded: 1996
- Defunct: 2011
- Fate: De-merged, retail business sold.
- Successor: EnergyAustralia; Ausgrid
- Headquarters: Sydney, Australia
- Area served: Sydney, Newcastle and Central Coast areas of NSW
- Services: Electricity retail and distribution Natural gas retail and distribution
- Owner: Government of New South Wales
- Number of employees: 4,767 (2006)
- Website: [

EnergyAustralia was a state–owned enterprise of the Government of New South Wales, Australia. It was electricity and gas supplier and retailer which primarily supplied the Sydney, Newcastle and Central Coast areas of New South Wales. after market deregulation, it increased its focus on retail supply opportunities in electricity and gas to the Victorian market and electricity in the deregulated South East Queensland.

== History ==
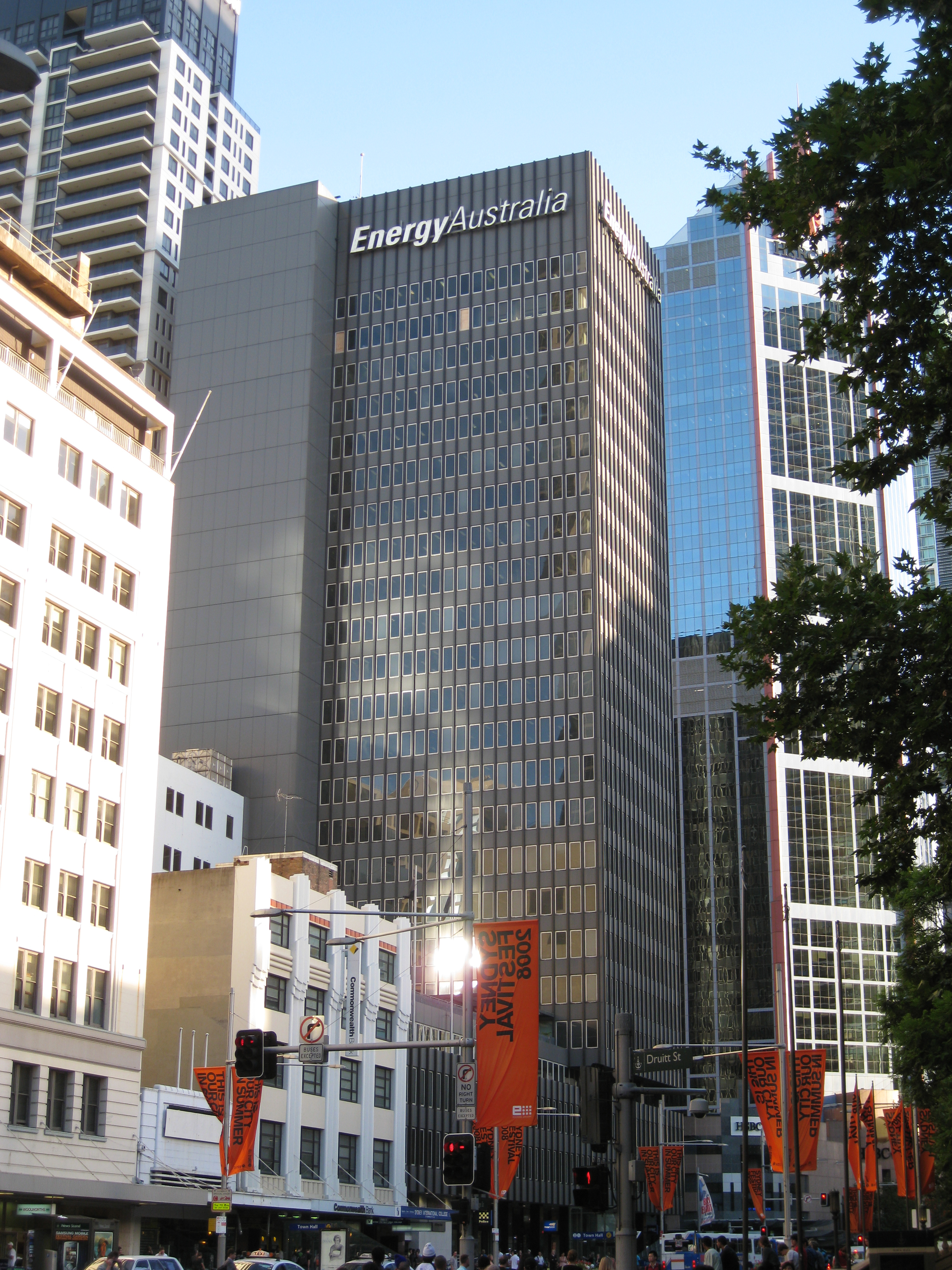
EnergyAustralia headquarters in George Street, Sydney

EnergyAustralia was formed from a merger in 1996 of Orion Energy (formerly Shortland Electricity and Shortland County Council) and Sydney Electricity which had succeeded Sydney County Council.

In 2005, EnergyAustralia formed a partnership with International Power to operate the retail business in Victoria and South Australia. EnergyAustralia sold its 50% share of the partnership to International Power, who then rebranded the former partnership as Simply Energy (now Engie Australia).

On 1 March 2011, EnergyAustralia's retail business was sold to CLP Group. The distribution business was renamed Ausgrid.

== Operations ==
The company had a price-regulated monopoly for the supply of electricity to its supply area. The residential energy market was deregulated in 1997 and full retail contestability introduced in 2002.

EnergyAustralia owned an electricity distribution network in addition to its retail activities. The electricity distribution network covered most of the eastern parts of Sydney, Central Coast and Hunter regions, with the Integral Energy distribution network covering most parts of Western Sydney.

EnergyAustralia owned its own metering services company Testing & Certification Australia, an accredited metering provider, providing contestable metering services to all energy retailers. TCA also includes a high power facility at Lane Cove, a NATA registered instrument calibration facility and was involved in electrical safety compliance testing of appliances until this division was closed in 2010, with the capability being sold to Vipac. The metering services, Lane Cove High Power Testing Station and instrument calibration facility were later rebranded to PLUS ES.

EnergyAustralia also offered customers the choice of renewable green power which produces no green house gas emissions and is accredited by the National GreenPower Accreditation Program.
