= Kath Anderson =

Australian politician

Kathleen Harris Anderson AM (née Hough; 1 November 1921 – 19 September 1996) was an Australian politician. She was a Labor member of the New South Wales Legislative Council from 1973 to 1981. Her husband, Keith Anderson, was briefly a member of the New South Wales Legislative Assembly (1961–1962), while her son, Peter Anderson, was a minister in the Unsworth Government (1986–1988).

She was born Kathleen Harris Hough in Canowindra to carpenter Tom Hough, later secretary of the Bridge and Wharf Carpenters' Union, and his wife, who was matron of a private hospital in Rodd Street, Canowindra. She attended Sydney Girls High School, and joined the Labor Party in 1963. In that year she became the first woman appointed to Sydney County Council, and served as chairperson from 1966 to 1970. She was active in the women's movement within the Labor Party, and was ultimately elected to the New South Wales Legislative Council in 1973. She became the first woman to serve as Government Whip in 1976.

Anderson left the Council in 1981, and in 1982 was appointed a Member of the Order of Australia "in recognition of service to the community, politics and the government". She became a member of the Local Government Boundaries Commission in 1981, and a member of the Zoological Parks Trust in 1990. Anderson died in 1996 in Sydney.
