= William Pettingell =

Australian politician

Sir William Walter Pettingell CBE (4 September 1914 – 27 January 1987) was an Australian businessman notable for his services to government and finance.

In 1936 he joined the Australian Gas Light Company as a research chemist, retiring 38 years later as managing director.

In 1957-58 he conducted a major review of the CSIRO's Division of Coal Research. One of the review's recommendations was that a mass spectrometer and a nuclear magnetic resonance spectrometer should be purchased forthwith.

From 1965 to 1967 he was a member of the Reserve Bank of Australia Board and a Fellow of the Senate of the University of Sydney. From 1967 to 1969 he was one of the three Commissioners of Sydney appointed by the Premier of New South Wales Robert Askin after the Labor council was sacked in 1967. At that time he was Chairman of the Australian Gas Light Company.

Knighted in 1972 for services to business, he was chairman of Australian Consolidated Industries from 1982 to 1986. In 1976, he was appointed to the Foreign Investment Review Board and was deputy chairman until 1985.

He was married to Lady Thora Pettingell and lived for many years in Castlecrag on Sydney's lower north shore.

== Honours ==
- 1959: Officer of the Order of the British Empire (OBE)
- 1965: Commander of the Order of the British Empire (CBE)
- 1972: Knight Bachelor for "services to finance and government"
