= Ausgrid =

State owned electricity infrastructure company

- Type: Private
- Industry: Utility
- Predecessor: EnergyAustralia
- Founded: 1 March 2011
- Headquarters: Sydney, Australia
- Area served: Sydney, Central Coast, Hunter Region
- Key people: Marc England (CEO)
- Services: Electricity distribution
- Owner: AustralianSuper and IFM Investors - 50.4% Government of New South Wales - 49.6%
- Website: www.ausgrid.com.au

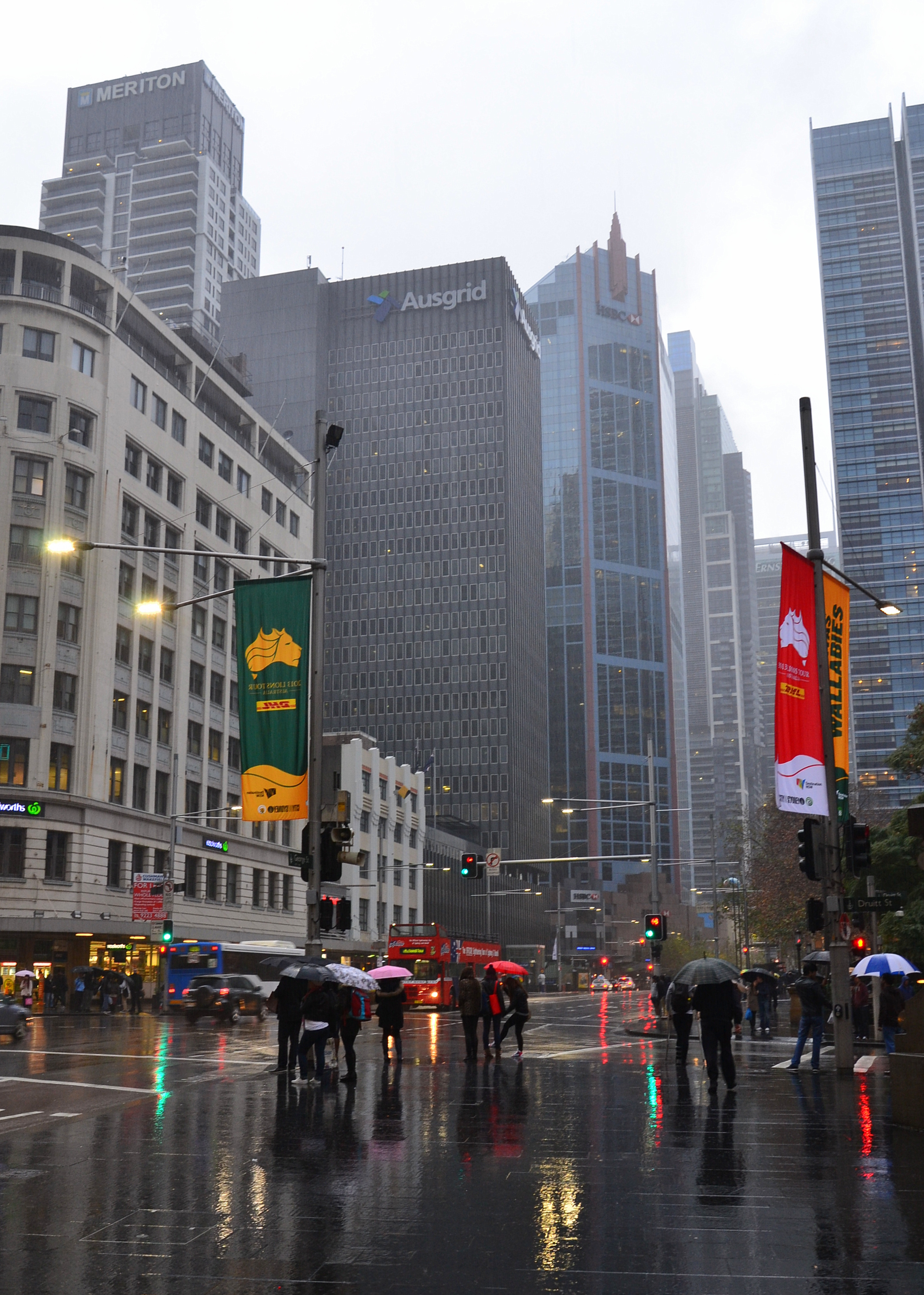
Ausgrid's old HQ building, Sydney

Ausgrid is an electricity distribution company which owns and operates the electrical networks supplying 1.8 million customers servicing more than 4 million people in Sydney, the Central Coast and Hunter regions of New South Wales, Australia. It was formed in 2011 from the state-owned energy retailer/distributor, EnergyAustralia, when the retail division of the company, along with the EnergyAustralia brand, was sold by the Government of New South Wales, and the remainder renamed Ausgrid.

== History ==
Ausgrid has received numerous complaints and requests for better stakeholder management and consultation of the local community. Ausgrid was seen as forcing its network capacity increasing (and therefore profit increasing) projects onto local residential communities. Residents in the suburbs of Leichhardt, Penshurst and East Lindfield protested against proposed electricity infrastructure being installed near their homes without proper consultation or response to complaints by the community. The residents, after many urgent appeals to Ausgrid's former COO Trevor Armstrong and the former chairman Roger Massey-Green, instead notified local MPs, the media, the Environmental Protection Authority and other authorities.

Ausgrid was also accused of "gold plating" its assets to inflate the privatisation price. Ausgrid undertook the rapid replacement of its fleet of vehicles.

== Ownership ==
Ausgrid was wholly owned by the Government of New South Wales from 2011 to 2016. In 2016, the New South Wales Government offered a 99-year lease of a 50.4% stake in Ausgrid. Initial bidding was won by a consortium of State Grid Corporation of China and Cheung Kong Infrastructure Holdings. On 11 August 2016 the Federal Government blocked the proposal on national security grounds over foreign ownership of critical infrastructure. In September 2016 the New South Wales Government accepted a $16 billion bid from Australian-based consortium AustralianSuper and IFM Investors.

== See also ==
- Sydney County Council
