= Emmet McDermott =

Australian politician

Sir Emmet McDermott KBE

73rd Lord Mayor of Sydney
- In office 27 September 1969 – 31 December 1972
- Deputy: Nicholas Shehadie
- Preceded by: John Armstrong
- Succeeded by: David Griffin

Alderman of the Sydney City Council
- In office 1 December 1962 – 13 November 1967
- Constituency: Gipps Ward
- In office 27 September 1969 – 16 September 1977
- Constituency: Macquarie Ward

Personal details
- Born: 6 September 1911 Glebe, New South Wales, Australia
- Died: 31 August 2002 (aged 90)
- Party: Civic Reform Association
- Spouse(s): Arline Hagon (m.1939–d.1987); Eula McDonald (–2002)
- Children: John Emmet McDermott; Anne Keeling
- Education: University of Sydney; Northwestern University
- Profession: Dental surgeon

Sir Lawrence Emmet McDermott KBE (6 September 1911 – 31 August 2002) was an Australian dentist, politician and Lord Mayor of Sydney between 1969 and 1972.

== Early life ==
Emmet McDermott was born in Glebe, the sixth of ten children. Educated at St Ignatius' College and the University of Sydney where he graduated in dentistry, he earned a doctorate of dentistry from Northwestern University in Chicago. McDermott was Consultant Dental Surgeon at the Royal Prince Alfred Hospital from 1942 and also worked at the Sydney Dental Hospital. He was the President of the Australian Dental Association (NSW) from 1960 to 1961 and became a Fellow of the Royal Australasian College of Dental Surgeons (FRACDS).

== City of Sydney ==
Joining the Civic Reform Association, he was elected to the Council of the City of Sydney in 1962, becoming Lord Mayor in 1969.

As Lord Mayor, he was instrumental in the preservation of the historic Queen Victoria Building and the conversion of Martin Place into a pedestrian mall.

== Later life ==
In the 1972 New Year Honours he was made a Knight Commander of the Order of the British Empire (KBE) in the civil division.

Sir Emmet McDermott died in 2002 age 90. He is survived by his son and daughter from his first marriage, and his second wife.

Professional and academic associations
Preceded by	President of the Australian Dental Association (NSW); 1960 – 1961	Succeeded by
Civic offices
Preceded by John Armstrong	Lord Mayor of Sydney; 1969 – 1972	Succeeded by David Griffin
Government offices
Preceded by Innes Stanley Haviland	Chairman of the Sydney County Council; 1977 – 1978	Succeeded by Douglas Burleigh Carruthers
