= Arthur McElhone =

Australian politician and businessman

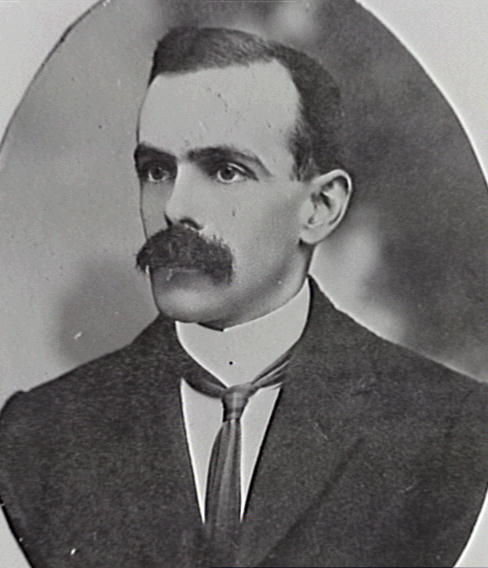
McElhone in c. 1901

Arthur Joseph McElhone (22 July 1868 – 17 June 1946) was an Australian politician and businessman. An independent, McElhone was a long-serving alderman for the City of Sydney, originally from 1899 to 1927, and again from 1930 until his death in 1946. In 1935, he became Lord Mayor of Sydney, following the death of Sir Alfred Parker. He was also twice chairman of the Sydney County Council (1937–1938, 1945–1946). He served as a director of the Royal Prince Alfred Hospital for 27 years.

McElhone was born in Sydney, the son of New South Wales politician John McElhone and his wife Mary Jane (née Browne). His brother, William Percy McElhone (1871–1932), also served as Lord Mayor of Sydney in 1922. He married Eva Catherine Walshe in 1897. The couple had four children; one of his sons, John Fitzroy McElhone (1899–1970), became a Sydney aldermen in 1946, serving until 1953.

McElhone died on 17 June 1946 at Gloucester House, Sydney, aged 77. In 1950, a park in Elizabeth Bay, Sydney, Arthur McElhone Reserve, was named in honour of him.

Civic offices
Preceded by Sir Alfred Parker	Lord Mayor of Sydney; 1935	Succeeded by Archibald Howie
