= Results of the 1944 New South Wales local elections =

1944 New South Wales local elections
- 2 December 1944

This is a list of local government area results for the 1944 New South Wales local elections.

(Note: Some results only show vote totals for successful candidates).

== Albury ==
1944 New South Wales local elections: Albury
Party	Candidate	Votes	%	±%
Independent	Dudley Padman	2,518		
Independent	Cleaver Bunton	2,278		
Independent	L. E. Heath	1,980		
Independent	H. Lamtert	1,875		
Independent	Alfred Waugh	1,846		
Independent	R. A. Robertson	1,628		
Independent	S. H. Logan	1,595		
Independent	J. P. Jelbart	1,582		
Independent	A. A. Rogers	1,581		

== Kearsley ==
Results of the 1944 New South Wales local elections
- 2 December 1944
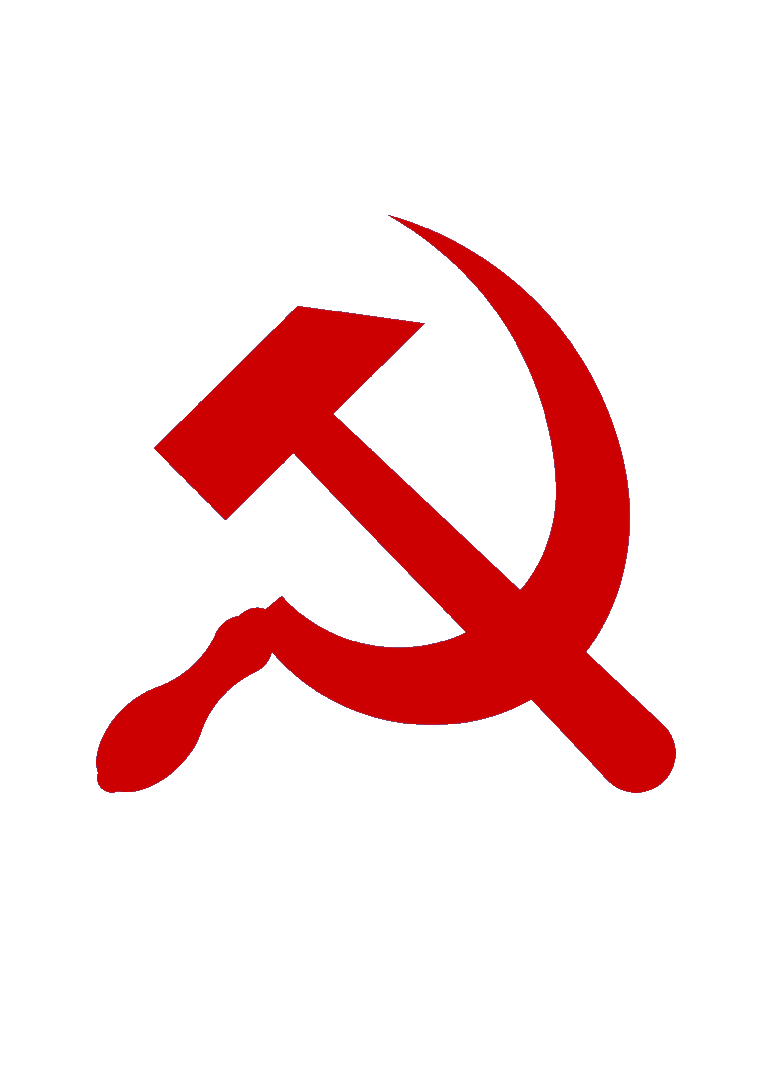
	First party	Second party	Third party
		IND	ALP
Leader	Bill Varty	N/A	A. Johnson
Party	Communist	Independents	Labor
Seats won	5 seats	2 seats	1 seat
Popular vote	4,149	3,084	703
Percentage	52.29%	38.66%	8.85%
Swing	▲52.29
Largest party before election
Independents
Largest party after election
Communist

=== Kearsley results ===
1944 New South Wales local elections: Kearsley
Party	Votes	%	Swing	Seats	Change
Communist	4,149	52.29	+52.29	5	▲5
Independent	3,084	38.86		2	
Labor	703	8.85		1	
Formal votes	7,936	100.0			

=== A Riding ===
1944 New South Wales local elections: A Riding
Party	Candidate	Votes	%	±%
Independent	A. Collins (elected)	unopposed		
Independent	L. Blackwell (elected)	unopposed		

=== B Riding ===
1944 New South Wales local elections: B Riding
Party	Candidate	Votes	%	±%
Communist	Bill Varty (elected)	1,033	40.92	+40.92
Communist	Allan Opie (elected)	838	33.20	+33.20
Various independents		653	25.88	
Total formal votes		2,524	100.0	
Party total votes
Communist		1,871	74.12	+74.12
Independents		653	25.88	

=== C Riding ===
1944 New South Wales local elections: C Riding
Party	Candidate	Votes	%	±%
Various independents		1,153	46.88	
Labor	A. Johnson (elected)	703	28.57	
Communist	James Palmer (elected)	604	24.55	+24.55
Total formal votes		2,460	100.0	
Party total votes
Independents		1,153	46.88	
Labor		703	28.57	
Communist		604	24.55	+24.55

=== D Riding ===
1944 New South Wales local elections: D Riding
Party	Candidate	Votes	%	±%
Various independents		1,278	43.30	
Communist	Jock Graham (elected)	893	30.25	+30.25
Communist	Nellie Simm (elected)	781	26.45	+26.45
Total formal votes		2,952	100.0	
Party total votes
Communist		1,674	56.70	+56.70
Independents		1,278	43.30	

== North Illawarra ==
1944 New South Wales local elections: North Illawarra
Party	Candidate	Votes	%	±%
Independent	C. W. Carr (elected)	1,533		
Independent	D. A. Amour (elected)	1,434		
Independent	C. W. Smith (elected)	1,296		
Communist	Jack Martin (elected)	1,225		
Independent	W. L. Vidler (elected)	1,221		
Independent	J. L. Dawson (elected)	1,075		
Independent	G. C. C. Rowland (elected)	1,071		
Independent	T. Dalton (elected)	1,047		
Independent	O. J. T. Murphy (elected)	1,041		
Independent	A. Marshall	1,025		
Independent	F. B. McMahon	976		
Independent	J, Campbell	969		
Independent	W. T. Hopwood	962		
Independent	W. J. T. Mascord	859		
Independent	T. B. G. Ward	827		
Independent	A. T. Ziems	816		
Independent	R. G. Hall	744		
Independent	T. Silcocks	738		
Independent	A. R. Wales	731		
Independent	G. Parker	714		
Independent	C. E. Tyler-White	617		
Independent	E. Downie	404		
Independent	W. A. G. Pollock	232		
Independent	W. P. Devlin	190		
Independent	R. Stibbard	132		

== Singleton ==
1944 New South Wales local elections: Singleton
Party	Candidate	Votes	%	±%
Independent	J. Brittliffe	503	13.4	
Independent	J. McGrogan	452	12.1	
Independent	R. H. Burgess	451	12.0	
Independent	R. J. Tulloch	443	11.8	
Independent	C. H. Dunlop	414	11.0	
Independent	E. Patridge	399	10.6	
Independent	G. H. Dunlop	383	10.2	
Independent	F. H. Madden	367	9.8	
Independent	F. Dickinson	337	9.0	
Total formal votes		3,749	100.0	

== Sydney ==
1944 New South Wales local elections: Sydney
Party	Votes	%	Swing	Seats	Change
Civic Reform	4,032	34.44		12	Steady
Labor	3,819	32.61		8	Steady
Lang Labor	2,938	25.09		0	Steady
Independent	920	7.86			
Formal votes	11,709	100.0			

=== Fitzroy ===
1944 New South Wales local elections: Fitzroy Ward
Party	Candidate	Votes	%	±%
Civic Reform	Arthur McElhone (elected)	1,267	45.5	
Lang Labor	P. McDonnell	548	19.7	
Independent	E. P. Tressider	495	17.8	
Independent	J. H. Catts	168	6.0	
Civic Reform	William James Bradley (elected)	130	4.7	
Independent	N. C. Jackson	56	2.0	
Civic Reform	Kenneth Stewart Williams (elected)	36	1.3	
Independent	G. Harrington	27	1.0	
Lang Labor	T. A. H. Mooney	26	0.9	
Civic Reform	William Parker Henson (elected)	12	0.4	
Lang Labor	V. R. Maney	11	0.4	
Lang Labor	C. L. Wagner	6	0.2	
Total formal votes		2,782		

=== Flinders ===
1944 New South Wales local elections: Flinders Ward
Party	Candidate	Votes	%	±%
Labor	John James Carroll (elected)	1,178	43.1	
Lang Labor	N. C. Christie	838	30.7	
Labor	Tom Shannon (elected)	292	10.7	
Labor	Dan Minogue (elected)	229	8.4	
Lang Labor	R. B. White	73	2.7	
Lang Labor	B. Cooley	62	2.3	
Labor	Anthony Doherty (elected)	34	1.2	
Lang Labor	E. J. McKenna	25	0.9	
Total formal votes		2,731		

=== Gipps ===
1944 New South Wales local elections: Gipps Ward
Party	Candidate	Votes	%	±%
Civic Reform	Ernest Samuel Marks (elected)	1,093	67.0	
Lang Labor	Susan Francis	224	13.7	
Civic Reform	Reginald James Bartley (elected)	158	9.7	
Lang Labor	E. J. O'Reilly	39	2.4	
Lang Labor	E. P. McCudden	38	2.3	
Civic Reform	James McMahon (elected)	38	2.3	
Civic Reform	Stanley Crick (elected)	33	2.0	
Lang Labor	R. McPherson	9	0.6	
Total formal votes		1,632		

=== Macquarie ===
1944 New South Wales local elections: Macquarie Ward
Party	Candidate	Votes	%	±%
Civic Reform	William Neville Harding (elected)	1,112	55.7	
Labor	J. S. Garden	573	28.7	
Labor	E. S. Glasgow	122	6.1	
Civic Reform	William Becker (elected)	75	3.8	
Civic Reform	Herbert Gordon Carter (elected)	45	2.3	
Civic Reform	Frank Grenville Pursell (elected)	33	1.7	
Labor	E. C. Sheiles	24	1.2	
Labor	A. W. Thompson	14	0.7	
Total formal votes		1,998		

=== Phillip ===
1944 New South Wales local elections: Phillip Ward
Party	Candidate	Votes	%	±%
Labor	Ernest Charles O'Dea (elected)	1,075	41.9	
Lang Labor	Horace Foley	998	38.9	
Labor	John Armstrong (elected)	188	7.3	
Independent	L. Drury	141	5.5	
Labor	Paddy Stokes (elected)	54	2.1	
Labor	Sydney George Molloy (elected)	36	1.4	
Independent	E. Taylor	33	1.3	
Lang Labor	S. H. Howey	22	0.9	
Lang Labor	J. Barry	15	0.6	
Lang Labor	L. C. Killmore	4	0.2	
Total formal votes		2,566		

== Wilcannia ==
1944 Wilcannia Municipal Council elections
- 2 December 1944

=== Wilcannia results ===
1944 Wilcannia Municipal Council Election
Party	Candidate	Votes	%	±%
Independent	H. D. Dell (elected unopposed)			
Independent	G. E. Green (elected unopposed)			
Independent	E. D. McKay (elected unopposed)			
Independent	J. Uhl (elected unopposed)			
Independent	D. J. McQueen (elected unopposed)			
Independent	A. M. Andrews (elected unopposed)			
Independent	J. A. Peters (elected unopposed)			
Total formal votes				
Informal votes				
Turnout				

== Willimbong ==
1944 Willimbong Shire Council election
- 2 December 1944

All 9 seats on Willimbong Shire Council 5 seats needed for a majority
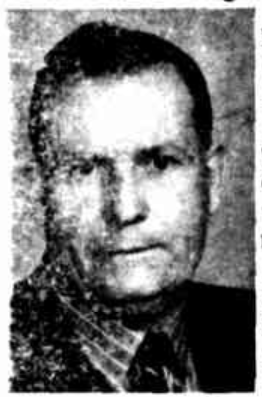
	First party	Second party
	IND	IND
Party	Independents	Independent Labor
Last election	6 seats	Did not contest
Seats before	6	?
Seats won	6	2
Seat change	Steady	▲2
Popular vote	3,588	934
Percentage	62.6%	16.3%
	Third party	Fourth party
		COM
Leader	Richard Alfred Struck	Colin Campbell
Party	Official Labor	Communist
Last election	3 seats	Did not contest
Seats before	?	0
Seats won	1	0
Seat change	▼2	Steady
Popular vote	914	300
Percentage	15.9%	5.2%
Largest party before election
Independents
Largest party after election
Independents

At the new council's inaugural meeting on Wednesday 6 December following the election, Cr. Struck was re-elected unopposed to a sixth term as Shire President and Cr. Gleeson was elected as Deputy over Cr. McClellan at 5 votes to 4.

=== Willimbong results ===
1944 New South Wales local elections: Willimbong Shire
Party	Votes	%	Swing	Seats	Change
Independents	3,588	62.6	-4.9	6	Steady
Independent Labor	934	16.3	+16.3	2	▲2
Labor	914	15.9	-16.6	1	▼2
Communist	300	5.2	+5.2	0	Steady
Total formal votes	5,736				
Informal votes					
Total formal ballots	1,912				
Turnout					
Registered voters					

==== A Riding ====
1944 New South Wales local elections: Willimbong (A Riding)
Party	Candidate	Votes	%	±%
Independent Labor	Oscar John "Jack" Washington (elected)	608	26.0	+2.5
Labor	Richard Alfred Struck (elected)	528	22.6	−0.8
Independent	Michael Joseph Gleeson (elected)	515	22.0	+0.7
Communist	Colin Campbell	300	12.8	+6.6
Labor	Arthur John Hunter-Boyd	281	12.0	new
Labor	Sydney Charles Evans	105	4.5	new
Total formal votes		2,337		
Informal votes				
Total formal ballots		779		
Registered electors				
Turnout				

==== B Riding ====
1944 New South Wales local elections: Willimbong (B Riding)
Party	Candidate	Votes	%	±%
Independent	Hector MacPherson Waring (elected)	387	21.6	+3.3
Independent	Carey Middleton M'Clellan (elected)	327	18.3	−0.5
Independent Labor	John Joseph O'Donoghue (elected)	326	18.2	−3.7
Independent	Arthur Frederick Thompson	312	17.4	+1.6
Independent	Thomson Benson Corneliusen	207	11.6	new
Independent	William Herbert Augustius Triebel	141	7.9	new
Independent	Patrick George Taylor	88	4.9	−6.8
Total formal votes		1,788		
Informal votes				
Total formal ballots		596		
Registered electors				
Turnout				

==== C Riding ====
1944 New South Wales local elections: Willimbong (C Riding)
Party	Candidate	Votes	%	±%
Independent	James Hubert Marks (elected)	289	17.9	+2.3
Independent	Herbert John Thomas Gorey (elected)	284	17.6	+0.5
Independent	William Arbuckle (elected)	243	15.1	−3.3
Independent	Martin Vincent Rourke	224	13.9	new
Independent	Arthur Marston	223	13.8	−3.4
Independent	Anton Marinus Poulsen	140	8.7	new
Independent	Alan Dewer Malcom	124	7.7	new
Independent	William Joseph Lamprell	84	5.2	new
Total formal votes		1,611		
Informal votes				
Total formal ballots		537		
Registered electors				
Turnout				
