= 1944 Sydney City Council election =

← 1941	2 December 1944	1948 →
- Turnout: 22.5%
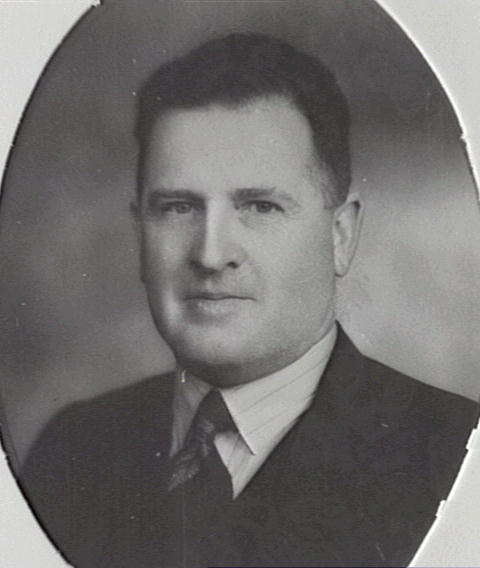

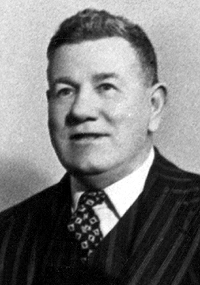

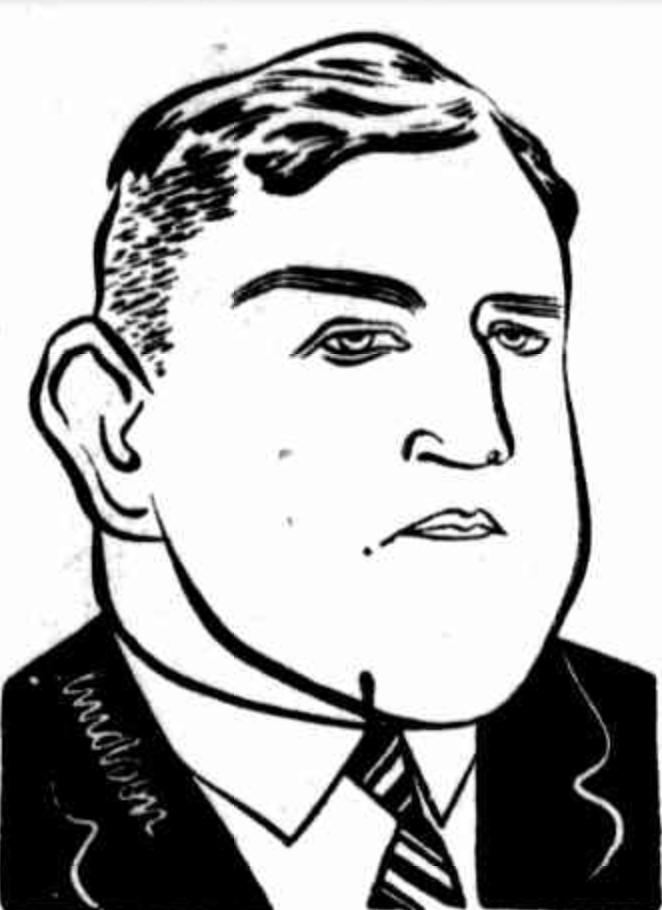
	First party	Second party	Third party
Leader	Reg Bartley	Ernest Charles O'Dea	Horace Foley
Party	Civic Reform	Labor	Lang Labor
Leader's seat	Gipps Ward	Phillip Ward	None (contested Phillip Ward)
Seats won	12 seats	8 seats	0 seats
Seat change	Steady	Steady	Steady
Percentage	34.44%	32.61%	25.09%

The 1944 Sydney City Council election was held on 2 December 1944 to elect 20 councillors to the City of Sydney. The election was held as part of the statewide local government elections in New South Wales, Australia.

The election saw the Civic Reform Association, which had controlled the council since 1930, re-elected.

Lang Labor came close to a victory in Phillip Ward, where Horace Foley had the second-highest primary vote. However, Labor retained all four seats.

== Results ==
1944 New South Wales local elections: Sydney
Party	Votes	%	Swing	Seats	Change
Civic Reform	4,032	34.44		12	Steady
Labor	3,819	32.61		8	Steady
Lang Labor	2,938	25.09		0	Steady
Independent	920	7.86			
Formal votes	11,709	100.0			

=== Fitzroy ===
1944 New South Wales local elections: Fitzroy Ward
Party	Candidate	Votes	%	±%
Civic Reform	Arthur McElhone (elected)	1,267	45.5	
Lang Labor	P. McDonnell	548	19.7	
Independent	E. P. Tressider	495	17.8	
Independent	J. H. Catts	168	6.0	
Civic Reform	William James Bradley (elected)	130	4.7	
Independent	N. C. Jackson	56	2.0	
Civic Reform	Kenneth Stewart Williams (elected)	36	1.3	
Independent	G. Harrington	27	1.0	
Lang Labor	T. A. H. Mooney	26	0.9	
Civic Reform	William Parker Henson (elected)	12	0.4	
Lang Labor	V. R. Maney	11	0.4	
Lang Labor	C. L. Wagner	6	0.2	
Total formal votes		2,782		

=== Flinders ===
1944 New South Wales local elections: Flinders Ward
Party	Candidate	Votes	%	±%
Labor	John James Carroll (elected)	1,178	43.1	
Lang Labor	N. C. Christie	838	30.7	
Labor	Tom Shannon (elected)	292	10.7	
Labor	Dan Minogue (elected)	229	8.4	
Lang Labor	R. B. White	73	2.7	
Lang Labor	B. Cooley	62	2.3	
Labor	Anthony Doherty (elected)	34	1.2	
Lang Labor	E. J. McKenna	25	0.9	
Total formal votes		2,731		

=== Gipps ===
1944 New South Wales local elections: Gipps Ward
Party	Candidate	Votes	%	±%
Civic Reform	Ernest Samuel Marks (elected)	1,093	67.0	
Lang Labor	Susan Francis	224	13.7	
Civic Reform	Reginald James Bartley (elected)	158	9.7	
Lang Labor	E. J. O'Reilly	39	2.4	
Lang Labor	E. P. McCudden	38	2.3	
Civic Reform	James McMahon (elected)	38	2.3	
Civic Reform	Stanley Crick (elected)	33	2.0	
Lang Labor	R. McPherson	9	0.6	
Total formal votes		1,632		

=== Macquarie ===
1944 New South Wales local elections: Macquarie Ward
Party	Candidate	Votes	%	±%
Civic Reform	William Neville Harding (elected)	1,112	55.7	
Labor	J. S. Garden	573	28.7	
Labor	E. S. Glasgow	122	6.1	
Civic Reform	William Becker (elected)	75	3.8	
Civic Reform	Herbert Gordon Carter (elected)	45	2.3	
Civic Reform	Frank Grenville Pursell (elected)	33	1.7	
Labor	E. C. Sheiles	24	1.2	
Labor	A. W. Thompson	14	0.7	
Total formal votes		1,998		

=== Phillip ===
1944 New South Wales local elections: Phillip Ward
Party	Candidate	Votes	%	±%
Labor	Ernest Charles O'Dea (elected)	1,075	41.9	
Lang Labor	Horace Foley	998	38.9	
Labor	John Armstrong (elected)	188	7.3	
Independent	L. Drury	141	5.5	
Labor	Paddy Stokes (elected)	54	2.1	
Labor	Sydney George Molloy (elected)	36	1.4	
Independent	E. Taylor	33	1.3	
Lang Labor	S. H. Howey	22	0.9	
Lang Labor	J. Barry	15	0.6	
Lang Labor	L. C. Killmore	4	0.2	
Total formal votes		2,566		
