= 1948 Sydney City Council election =

- 4 December 1948
- Turnout: 75%
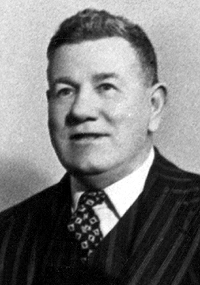

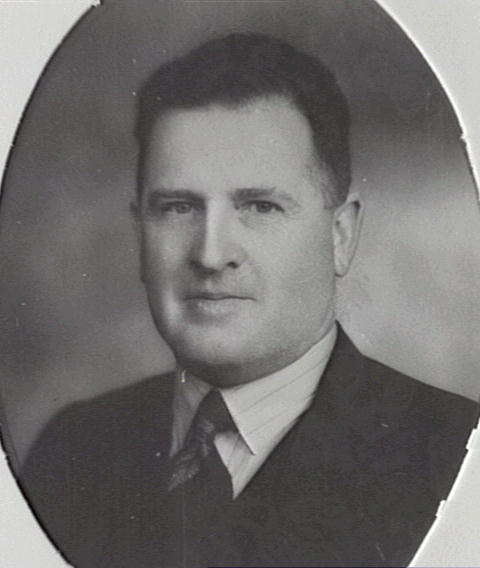

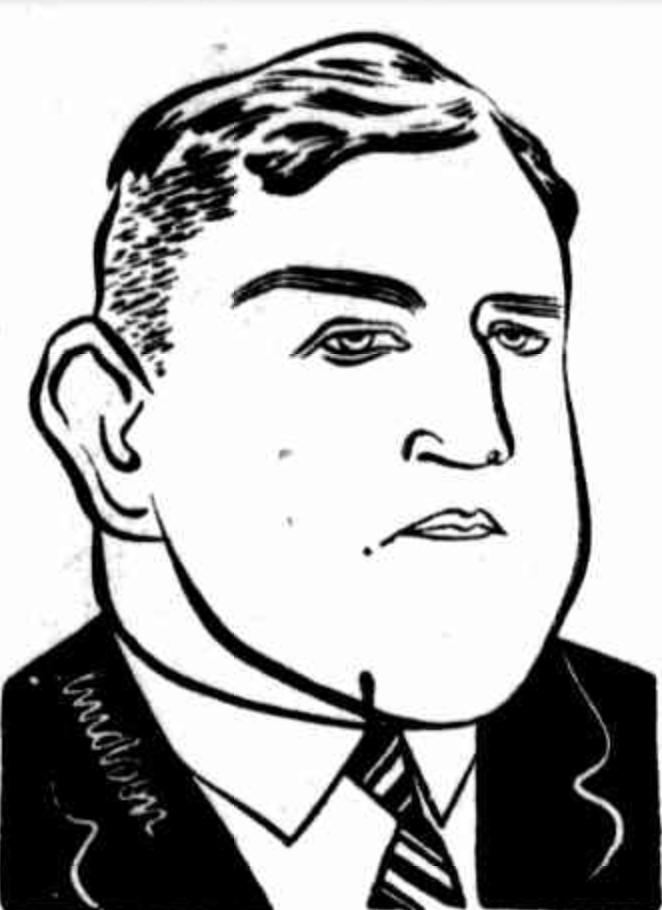
| | First party | Second party | Third party |
|---|---|---|---|
| Leader | Ernest Charles O'Dea | Reg Bartley | Horace Foley |
| Party | Labor | Civic Reform | Lang Labor |
| Leader's seat | Phillip Ward | Gipps Ward | Phillip Ward (lost seat) |
| Last election | 8 seats | 12 seats | 0 seats |
| Seats before | 7 (Note: On 6 April 1945, Labor alderman Paddy Stokes (Phillip Ward) died. The by-election held on 5 May was won by Lang Labor candidate Horace Foley.) | 11 (Note: Civic Reform alderman William Neville Harding (Macquarie Ward) left the CRA to form the City Progressives ahead of the election.) | 1 |
| Seats won | 19 seats | 9 seats | 2 seats |
| Seat change | ▲12 | ▼2 | ▲1 |

The 1948 Sydney City Council election was held on 4 December 1948 to elect councillors to the City of Sydney, a local government area of New South Wales, Australia.

Labor won a majority on council for the first time in 21 years, defeating the Civic Reform Association.

Although scheduled to be held as part of the statewide local elections in 1947, the election was delayed by a year.

== Background ==
In 1947, the state Labor government expanded the boundaries of the City of Sydney to include the following municipalities:

- Alexandria
- Darlington
- Erskineville
- Newtown
- Paddington
- Redfern
- The Glebe
- Waterloo

This saw the number of councillors increase from 20 to 30. The existing five four-member wards − Fitzroy, Flinders, Gipps, Macquarie and Phillip − were unchanged, while another four were created:

- Newtown Ward (four councillors)
- Glebe Ward (two councillors)
- Redfern Ward (two councillors)
- Paddington Ward (two councillors)

This was also the first Sydney City Council election to use first-past-the-post, replacing preferential voting. The change only lasted several years.

== Campaign ==
Civic Reform campaigned against Labor on a message of "keeping local government in Sydney free of politics".

114 candidates contested the election, with seven different groups endorsing candidates:

- Australian Labor Party (Official Labor)
- City Progressives (Note: In Fitzroy Ward, the City Progressives candidates were reported by The Sydney Morning Herald to be endorsed by the King's Cross Citizens and Ratepayers' Association.)
- Civic Reform Association
- Communist Party of Australia
- Independent Lang Labor
- Lang Labor
- Social Justice Progressives
