= Results of the 1947 New South Wales local elections =

1947 New South Wales local elections
- 6 December 1947

These are the results of the 1947 New South Wales local elections which were held across the state on Saturday 6 December 1941.

== Kearsley ==
1947 Kearsley Shire election
- 6 December 1947

All 8 seats on Kearsley Shire Council 5 seats needed for a majority
- Registered: 17,052
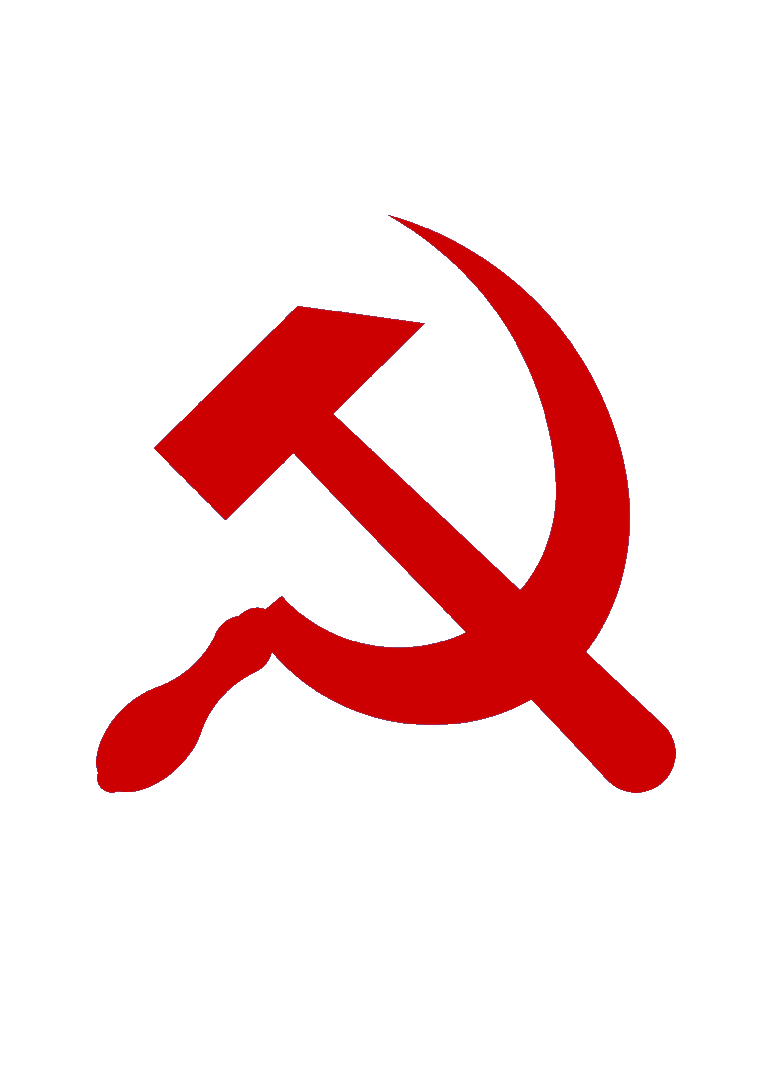
	First party	Second party	Third party
		ALP	IND
Leader	Bill Varty	A. Johnson	N/A
Party	Communist	Labor	Independents
Leader's seat	B Riding (lost seat)	C Riding	N/A
Last election	5 seats	1 seat	2 seats
Seat change	▼	▲
Largest party before election
Independents
Largest party after election
Communist

As of August, the Shire's enrolment figure stood at 17,052.

The Kurri branch of the ALP ran a full ticket in D Riding. The Labor Party also ran a full ticket in C Riding.

At the new council's inaugural meeting on Thursday 11 December, Cr. A. Collins was elected Shire President and Cr. A. Johnson Deputy.

=== Kearsley results ===
==== A Riding ====
1944 New South Wales local elections: A Riding
Party	Candidate	Votes	%	±%
Independent	Andrew Eric Collins (elected)	1,557	36.8	
Independent	James Proudfoot (elected)	1,276	30.2	
Independent	John Edward McDonald	896	21.2	
Independent	John Patrick Murphy	503	11.9	
Total formal votes		4,232	97.7	
Informal votes		99	2.3	
Total formal ballots				
Registered electors				
Turnout				

==== B Riding ====
1944 New South Wales local elections: B Riding
Party	Candidate	Votes	%	±%
Independent	Phillip Sloane Stanley Kemmel (elected)	2,425	32.7	
Independent	Francis Russel McGoldrick (elected)	2,049	27.6	
Communist	William Varty	1,658	22.3	
Independent	Bernard Maguire Toner	1,294	17.4	
Total formal votes		7,426	96.9	
Informal votes		241	3.1	
Total formal ballots				
Registered electors				
Turnout				

==== C Riding ====
1944 New South Wales local elections: C Riding
Party	Candidate	Votes	%	±%
Labor	Albert Edward Johnson (elected)	1,084	19.1	
Independent	Astley Stanton Slack (elected)	1,035	18.3	
Independent	Arthur Cecil Andrews	913	16.1	
Labor	Patrick Cagney	829	14.6	
Communist	James Palmer	635	11.2	
Independent	William Henry May	615	10.9	
Independent	Thomas Edward Kenneth Lewis	332	5.9	
Independent	Thomas Gregory (Note: Self-described Progressive Candidate, however it is unclear if this means a Progressive Party Candidate.)	219	3.9	
Total formal votes		5,662	97.6	
Informal votes		139	2.4	
Total formal ballots				
Registered electors				
Turnout				

==== D Riding ====
1944 New South Wales local elections: D Riding
Party	Candidate	Votes	%	±%
Labor	James Thomas Blackwell Butler (elected)	2,176	27.0	
Labor	Francis Henry Cockerill (elected)	2,173	26.9	
Communist	Mary Ellen Simm	1,882	23.3	
Communist	John Graham	1,833	22.7	
Total formal votes		8,064	97.2	
Informal votes		229	2.8	
Total formal ballots				
Registered electors				
Turnout				
