= 1944 Kearsley Shire Council election =

Local election in New South Wales

- 2 December 1944
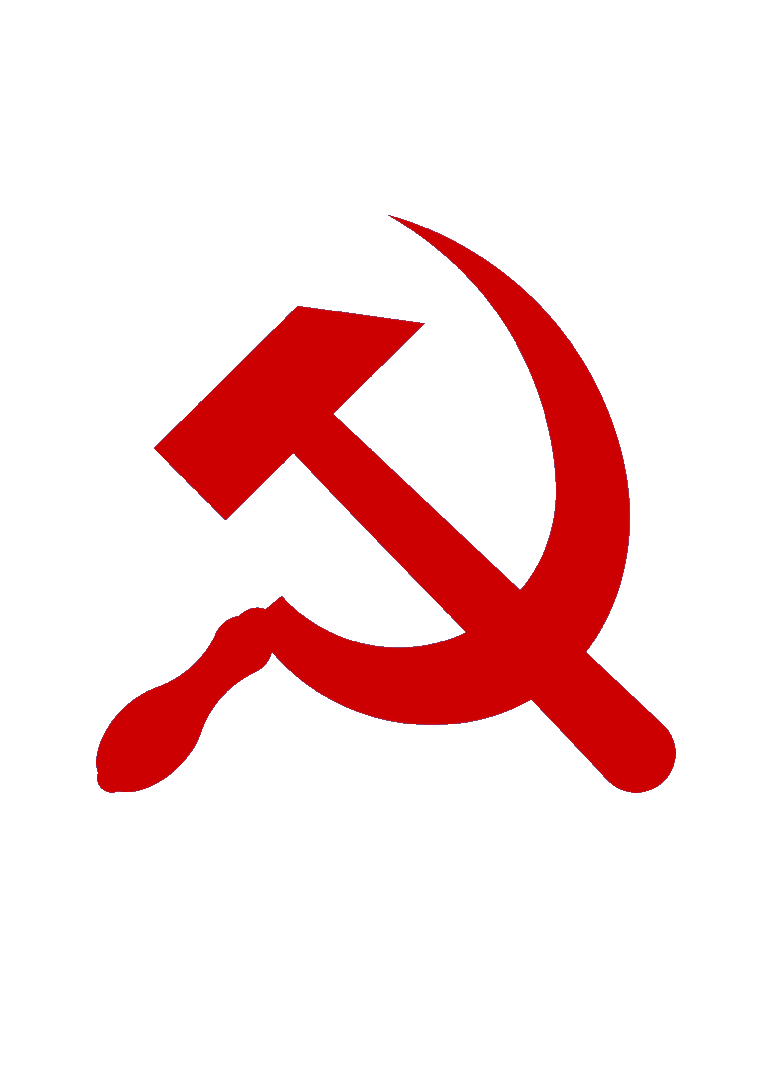
	First party	Second party	Third party
		IND	ALP
Leader	Bill Varty	N/A	A. Johnson
Party	Communist	Independents	Labor
Seats won	5 seats	2 seats	1 seat
Popular vote	4,149	3,084	703
Percentage	52.29%	38.66%	8.85%
Swing	▲52.29

The 1944 Kearsley Shire Council election was held on 2 December 1944 to elect eight councillors to Kearsley Shire. The election was held as part of the statewide local government elections in New South Wales, Australia.

The election was notable for resulting in five members of the Australian Communist Party being elected. According to the party's official newspaper, Tribune, this was the first time a communist party had won a local government majority in the English-speaking world.

As of 2024, this is the most seats won by a communist political party in Australia in a single LGA. The present-day Communist Party of Australia had one councillor elected to Auburn City Council from 2012 until 2016, which remains its only electoral victory.

== Background ==
Kearsley Shire was one of 138 shire councils in New South Wales in 1944. It was based in Cessnock, and also included the towns of Branxton, Greta and Kearsley. The council was split into four two-member wards (also known as ridings) − A Riding, B Riding, C Riding and D Riding.

During World War II, the party (although banned from 1940 to 1942) rose in popularity. Its membership rose to 20,000, it won control of a number of important trade unions, and a Communist candidate, Fred Paterson, was elected to the Queensland parliament in April 1944.

In late 1944, the party launched a campaign to get its members elected to councils. At the statewide local elections in December, a total of 16 Communist candidates won seats across six different LGAs, with its best results in Kearsley and neighbouring Cessnock.

== Results ==
Five Communist councillors were elected, giving the party a majority. The party's best result was in B Riding, where the Communist ticket had 74% of the vote. Both independent councillors in A Riding were re-elected unopposed.

=== Kearsley results ===
1944 New South Wales local elections: Kearsley
Party	Votes	%	Swing	Seats	Change
Communist	4,149	52.29	+52.29	5	▲5
Independent	3,084	38.86		2	
Labor	703	8.85		1	
Formal votes	7,936	100.0			

=== A Riding ===
1944 New South Wales local elections: A Riding
Party	Candidate	Votes	%	±%
Independent	A. Collins (elected)	unopposed		
Independent	L. Blackwell (elected)	unopposed		

=== B Riding ===
1944 New South Wales local elections: B Riding
Party	Candidate	Votes	%	±%
Communist	Bill Varty (elected)	1,033	40.92	+40.92
Communist	Allan Opie (elected)	838	33.20	+33.20
Various independents		653	25.88	
Total formal votes		2,524	100.0	
Party total votes
Communist		1,871	74.12	+74.12
Independents		653	25.88	

=== C Riding ===
1944 New South Wales local elections: C Riding
Party	Candidate	Votes	%	±%
Various independents		1,153	46.88	
Labor	A. Johnson (elected)	703	28.57	
Communist	James Palmer (elected)	604	24.55	+24.55
Total formal votes		2,460	100.0	
Party total votes
Independents		1,153	46.88	
Labor		703	28.57	
Communist		604	24.55	+24.55

=== D Riding ===
1944 New South Wales local elections: D Riding
Party	Candidate	Votes	%	±%
Various independents		1,278	43.30	
Communist	Jock Graham (elected)	893	30.25	+30.25
Communist	Nellie Simm (elected)	781	26.45	+26.45
Total formal votes		2,952	100.0	
Party total votes
Communist		1,674	56.70	+56.70
Independents		1,278	43.30	

== Aftermath ==
Following the election, councillors voted for William "Bill" Varty to serve as shire president. Between 1930 and 1943, prior to running as a Communist, Varty had served in the position for four (yearly) terms, along with two years as deputy president. He was also a former Australian Labor Party (ALP) and State Labor Party member.

Reacting to the election of the Communists, other councils − including Albury, Maitland, Muswellbrook and Taree − accused Kearley of "deplorable action" and "disloyalty". However, Lake Macquarie (which itself had elected three Communist councillors) co-operated with Kearsley.

After the election, the council was committed to municipal socialism, advocating nationalisation of electricity and the expansion of the social wage, and was unique for its commitment to activism around federal and international affairs.

=== 1947 election ===
Ahead of the 1947 local elections, the state Labor government introduced compulsory voting for local elections, seen as an attempt to give them an advantage and harm the Communist Party.

Allan Opie resigned from council on 14 August 1947, and Bernard Tonner took his place as one of the candidates on the Communist ticket in B Riding.

The elections saw Communist Party councillors defeated in five LGAs, with no members re-elected in Kearsley (although their actual number of votes rose, their percent of the vote went down). Five Labor candidates, including incumbent C Riding councillor A. Johnson, were elected.

Former councillor Mary Ellen "Nellie" Simm later ran for the party at the 1950 state election in Kurri Kurri, and again at the 1951 Australian Senate election.
