= Phillip Ward (City of Sydney) =

Electoral ward of Sydney, New South Wales

Phillip Ward New South Wales — Sydney City Council
- Created: 1842 (first incarnation); 1900 (second incarnation); 1959 (third incarnation)
- Abolished: 1850 (first); 1953 (second); 1987 (third)
- Electors: 684 (1842); 2,499 (1900); 3,494 (1924); 7,048 (1934); 13,382 (1950); 33,465 (1959); 8,466 (1977)

Phillip Ward (also originally known as Phillip's Ward) was a ward of the Sydney City Council. It was one of six wards created for the inaugural election in 1842, and was abolished on two separate occasions before its final abolishment when all wards were removed in 1987.

== History ==
Phillip Ward was created in 1842 ahead of the first election on 1 November. It had 684 electors and included the head of Darling Harbour, Chippendale, Pyrmont and Ultimo.

By 1900, the ward had 2,499 electors. The ward was a stronghold for the Labor Party, who had a clean sweep on multiple occasions.

At the 1974 election, where Labor only won three seats across the entire council, Civic Reform won one of the Phillip Ward seats.

Phillip Ward was abolished in 1987, along with all other Sydney City Council wards, in favour of an undivided council.

== Councillors for Phillip Ward ==
=== Second incarnation (1900−1953) ===
Year	Councillor	Party	Councillor	Party	Councillor	Party	Councillor	Party
1937	Ernest Charles O'Dea	Labor	John Farrell	Labor	John Armstrong	Labor	Paddy Stokes	Labor
1941	Ernest Charles O'Dea	Labor	Sydney George Molloy	Labor	John Armstrong	Labor	Paddy Stokes	Labor
1944	Ernest Charles O'Dea	Labor	Sydney George Molloy	Labor	John Armstrong	Labor	Paddy Stokes	Labor
1945	Ernest Charles O'Dea	Labor	Sydney George Molloy	Labor	John Armstrong	Labor	Horace Foley	Lang Labor
1948	Ernest Charles O'Dea	Labor	J. J. Carroll	Labor	R. J. Frazer	Labor	J. A. Bodkin	Labor

== Election results ==
=== 1945 by-election ===
1945 Phillip Ward by-election (5 May 1945)
Party	Candidate	Votes	%	±%
Lang Labor	Horace Foley	1,853	51.3	+12.4
Labor	J. C. Carroll	1,047	29.0	−12.9
Progressive	A. R. Sloss	603	16.7	+16.7
Independent	J. Carroll	111	3.1	+3.1
Total formal votes		3,614	98.1	
Informal votes		71	1.9	
Turnout		3,685		
Lang Labor gain from Labor		Swing	+12.4	

- By-election triggered by death of alderman Paddy Stokes on 6 April 1945

=== 1944 ===
1944 New South Wales local elections: Phillip Ward
Party	Candidate	Votes	%	±%
Labor	Ernest Charles O'Dea (elected)	1,075	41.9	
Lang Labor	Horace Foley	998	38.9	
Labor	John Armstrong (elected)	188	7.3	
Independent	L. Drury	141	5.5	
Labor	Paddy Stokes (elected)	54	2.1	
Labor	Sydney George Molloy (elected)	36	1.4	
Independent	E. Taylor	33	1.3	
Lang Labor	S. H. Howey	22	0.9	
Lang Labor	J. Barry	15	0.6	
Lang Labor	L. C. Killmore	4	0.2	
Total formal votes		2,566		

=== 1941 ===
1941 New South Wales local elections: Phillip Ward
Party	Candidate	Votes	%	±%
Labor	John Armstrong	unopposed		
Labor	S. G. Molloy	unopposed		
Labor	Ernest Charles O'Dea	unopposed		
Labor	Paddy Stokes	unopposed		
Registered electors		19,000		

=== 1842 ===
1842 Sydney City Council election: Phillip Ward
Party	Candidate	Votes	%	±%
Independent	Edward Flood	295		
Independent	James Robert Wilshire	269		
Independent	Neale	222		
Independent	Taylor	203		
Independent	Blackman	187		
Independent	Wallace	115		
Independent	Hayes	69		
Independent	Grose	33		
