= 1941 Sydney City Council election =

1941 Australian local government election

- 6 December 1941
- Turnout: < 14,000
	First party	Second party	Third party
	CRA	ALP	SLP
Party	Civic Reform	Labor	State Labor
Seats won	12	8	0

An election was held on 6 December 1941 to elect councillors to the City of Sydney. The election was held as part of the statewide local government elections in New South Wales, Australia.

The election saw the Civic Reform Association, which had controlled the council since 1930, re-elected. Suffrage was extended to all adult residents, however turnout was lower than the previous election in 1937.

== Campaign ==
The Sun observed that there was a "mysterious appearance of "illegal" how-to-vote cards in Macquarie Ward" on the day of the election, which saw Civic Reform preference Official Labor over the State Labor Party.

Prior to the election, Fitzroy Ward alderman Arthur McElhone rejoined Civic Reform to contest as an endorsed candidate.

Phillip Ward was uncontested.

== Results ==
=== Fitzroy ===
1941 New South Wales local elections: Fitzroy Ward
Party	Candidate	Votes	%	±%
Civic Reform	Arthur McElhone	1,715		
Labor	Maurice Curotta	701		
	H. W. Watkins	292		
	P. McDonnell	281		
	K. S. Williams	236		
	E. P. Tressider	85		
	J. Bradley	83		
	H. Alexander	56		
	J. S. Garden	43		
	H. N. Gilmour	24		
	T.C. McGillick	18		
	J. B. Sweeney	16		
	G. Cunningham	15		
	A. P. Richardson	12		
	J. Wright	11		

=== Flinders ===
1941 New South Wales local elections: Flinders Ward
Party	Candidate	Votes	%	±%
Labor	Tom Shannon	1,021		
Labor	Dan Minogue	347		
Independent	Barney McDonnell	128		
Labor	John James Carroll	111		
	D. M. Grant	85		

=== Gipps ===
1941 New South Wales local elections: Gipps Ward
Party	Candidate	Votes	%	±%
Civic Reform	E. S. Marks	1,275		
	B. C. Walters	518		
	A. J. Buckingham	225		
Civic Reform	Stanley Crick	225		
	J. McMahon	95		
	G. F. Davis	49		
	K. Ellis	33		
	B. E. Lewis	16		

=== Macquarie ===
1941 New South Wales local elections: Macquarie Ward
Party	Candidate	Votes	%	±%
Civic Reform	William Neville Harding	1,206		
State Labor	A. R. Sloss	1,005		
Labor	E. C. Sheiles	510		
Civic Reform	Reg Bartley	135		
	A. A. Alam	100		
Civic Reform	H. G. Carter	50		
Civic Reform	F. G. Pursell	40		
	M. J. R. Hughes	15		
	F. McCarthy	13		
	J. H. Sydney	13		
	R. McKenzie	12		
	H. J. P. Woodward	12		
	P. W. Kenna	5		

=== Phillip ===
1941 New South Wales local elections: Phillip Ward
Party	Candidate	Votes	%	±%
Labor	John Armstrong	unopposed		
Labor	S. G. Molloy	unopposed		
Labor	Ernest Charles O'Dea	unopposed		
Labor	Paddy Stokes	unopposed		
Registered electors		19,000		
