= BWU =

BWU may mean:

- "BWU" (song), by Tegan and Sara
- Baldwin Wallace University, in Berea, Ohio
- BoyWithUke, an acronym commonly used by the BoyWithUke fandom
- Bankstown Airport, IATA airport code "BWU"
- Barbados Workers' Union
- Big Willy Unleashed, a side game in the Destroy All Humans franchise
- Blind Workers' Union of Victoria, a trade union in Australia
- Blue Whale Unit, a unit of measurement in whaling
