= Henry Macdermott =

Irish-born politician and merchant in colonial Australia

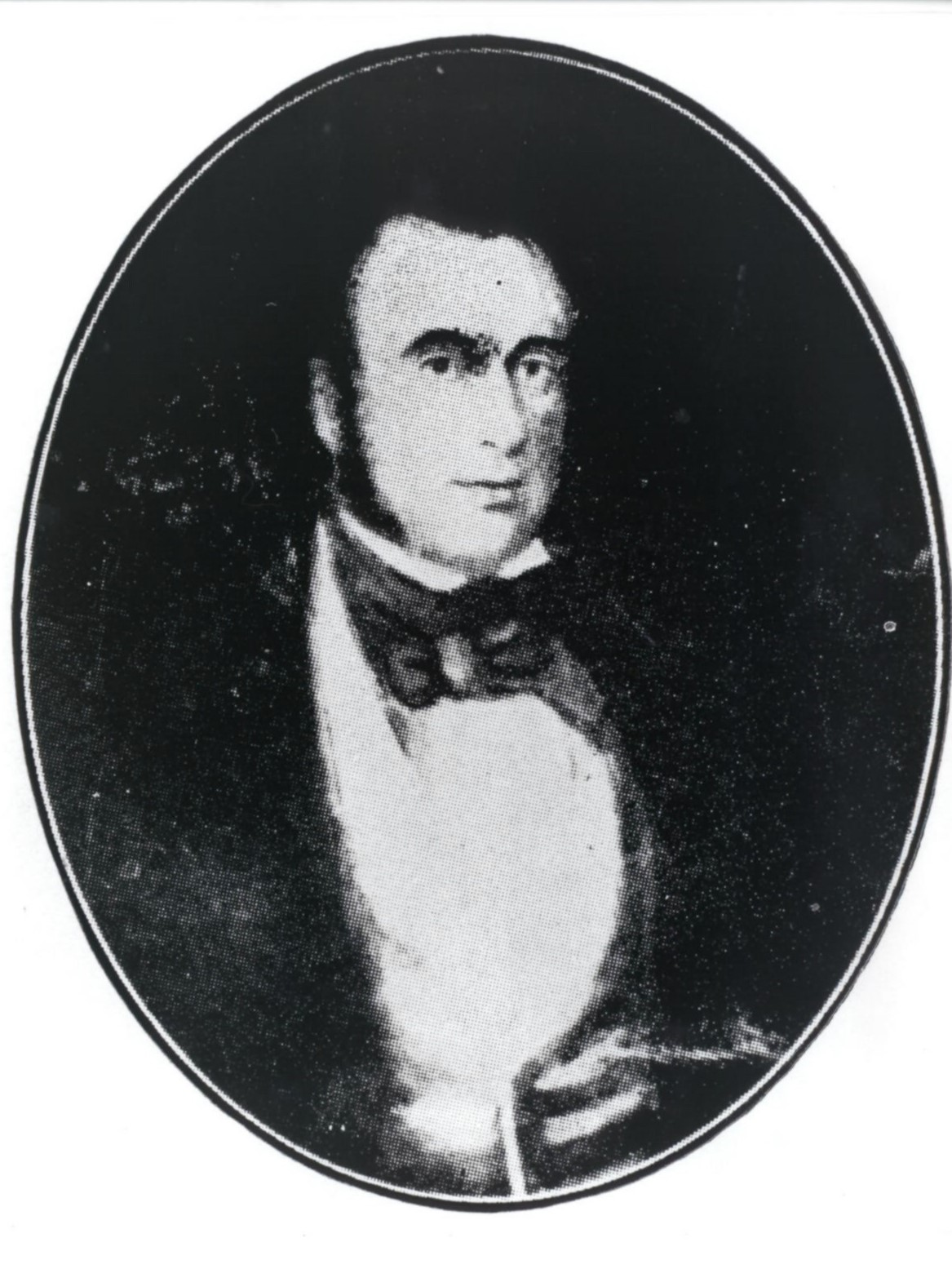
Portrait of Henry Macdermott

Henry Macdermott (1798 – 1 February 1848) was an Irish-born politician and merchant in the colony of New South Wales. He served as mayor of Sydney in 1845. He was a sergeant-major in the British Army.

== Biography ==
Macdermott was born to a Protestant family in County Roscommon. His father was a British Army officer. Having enlisted in 1820, Macdermott was a sergeant with the 39th Regiment by the time he had arrived in Australia in 1827. His military career ended in 1831, having achieved the rank of sergeant-major. He was elected as an alderman for the City of Sydney in November 1842. He was mayor in 1845, before resigning from council in August 1847 due to bankruptcy.

In 1837, Macdermott married Catherine Small in Sydney. The couple had at least five children. He died on 1 February 1848, aged 49.

Civic offices
Preceded by George Allen	Mayor of Sydney; 1845	Succeeded by Thomas Broughton
