= Thomas Broughton (Australian politician) =

Australian politician

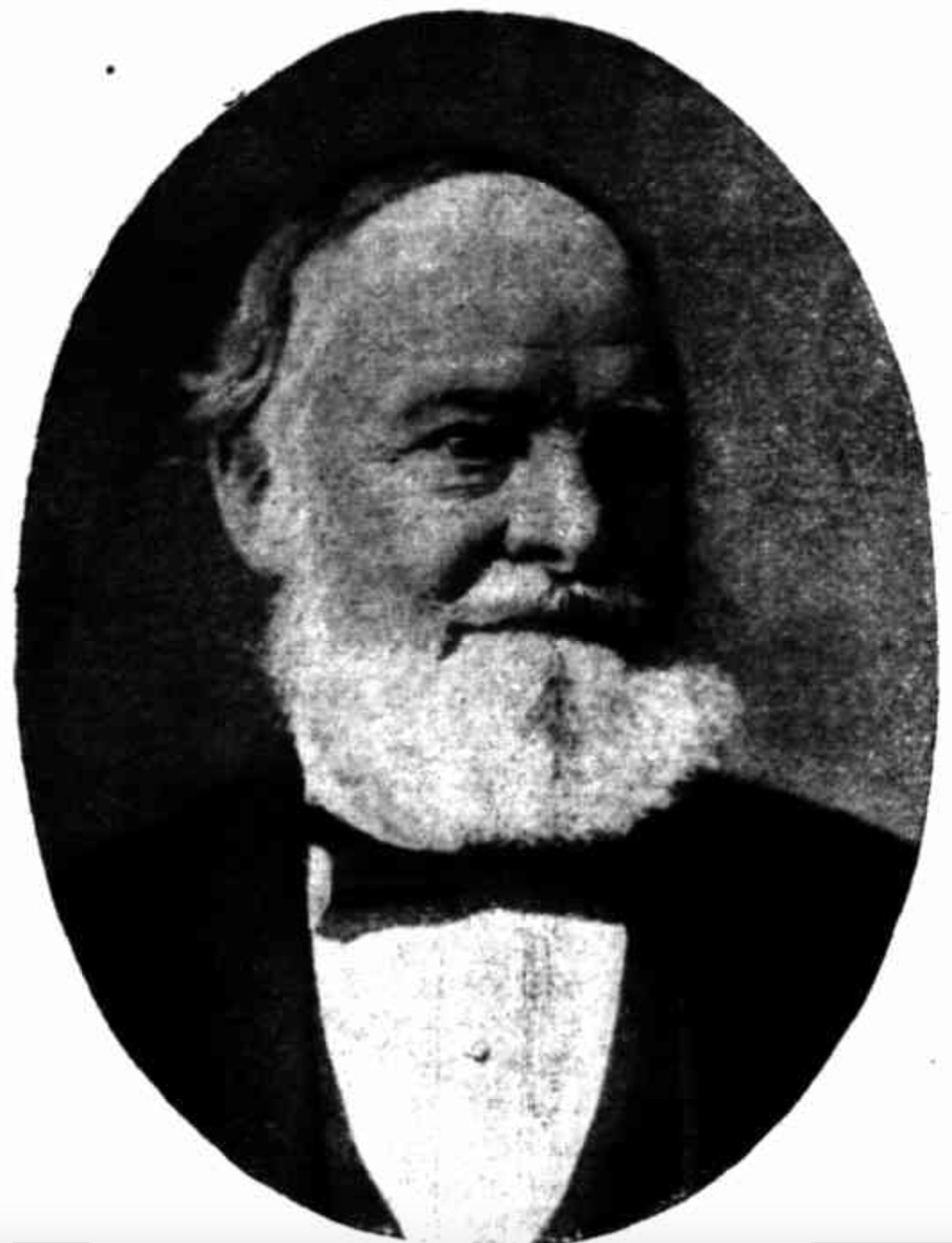
Thomas Broughton

Thomas Stafford Broughton (10 August 1810 – 12 December 1901) was an Australian politician.

He was born in Windsor to Thomas Broughton and Mary Stafford. At the age of nine he became an apprentice tailor, owning his own business by the age of 23. In 1838 he married Jane Tindale, with whom he had fifteen children. By this time he was farming, with over 150,000 acres in the Lachlan River district, together with the Artarmon estate and a residence at Paddington. In November 1842, he was elected as alderman for Macquarie Ward on the City of Sydney, serving until 1851 (including a period as mayor in 1847). In 1859 he was elected to the New South Wales Legislative Assembly for West Sydney, but he was defeated in 1860. Broughton died at Glebe in 1901.

New South Wales Legislative Assembly
| New seat | Member for West Sydney; 1859–1860; Served alongside: John Lang, James Pemell, John Plunkett | Succeeded by Daniel Dalgleish; William Love; William Windeyer |
Civic offices
| Preceded by Henry McDermott | Mayor of Sydney; 1847 | Succeeded by Joshua Josephson |
