= Municipality of Cessnock =

Former local government area in New South Wales, Australia

Municipality of Cessnock New South Wales
- Established: 1 November 1926
- Abolished: 1 January 1957
- Council seat: Cessnock
- Region: Hunter

The Municipality of Cessnock was a local government area in the Hunter Region of New South Wales, Australia.

Cessnock was proclaimed on 1 November 1926 after being excised from Cessnock Shire.

It amalgamated with Kearsley Shire (which had been renamed from Cessnock Shire) to form the Municipality of Greater Cessnock on 1 January 1957.

== Council ==
The municipality was governed by Cessnock Municipal Council, which was composed of nine elected councillors. At the 1941 local elections, the Progressive Municipal Labor Party won a majority. However, the party lost all its seats at the following election in 1944, while the Communist Party won two seats of its own.
