= 1842 Sydney City Council election =

1 November 1842	1843 →
Lord Mayor before election
Charles Windeyer
Subsequent Lord Mayor
John Hosking

The 1842 Sydney City Council election was held on 1 November 1842 to elect 24 aldermen for the City of Sydney in the Colony of New South Wales.

This was the first election for Sydney after it was formally established on 20 July 1842. A total of 49 candidates contested the election, with polling open from 9 a.m. until 4 p.m.

Following the election, John Hosking was elected by the aldermen as lord mayor.

In Brisbane Ward, The Sydney Morning Herald reported that some electors chose not to vote because they had promised their votes to five or six candidates, and upon discovering they could only vote for four, decided not to vote at all.

== Electoral system ==
The franchise was granted to individuals who occupied and paid rates on a property; however, if they owned property in multiple wards, they could vote in only one. Women were not eligible to vote.

Six wards—Bourke, Brisbane, Cook, Gipps, Macquarie, and Phillip—were established, each represented by four councillors, covering a total of 3,202 electors.

One councillor from each ward was required to resign their seat annually, resulting in elections being held every year.

== Results ==
=== Bourke ===
1842 Sydney City Council election: Bourke Ward
Party	Candidate	Votes	%	±%
Independent	John Hosking	344		
Independent	Foss	305		
Independent	George Allen	262		
Independent	Owen	241		
Independent	Campbell	219		
Independent	Welch	95		

=== Brisbane ===
1842 Sydney City Council election: Brisbane Ward
Party	Candidate	Votes	%	±%
Independent	Smidmore			
Independent	Holden			
Independent	Poole			
Independent	Gosling			
Independent	Hunt			
Independent	Manning			
Independent	Little			
Independent	Murray			
Independent	Wilson			
Independent	Kellick			
Total formal votes		520		

=== Cook ===
1842 Sydney City Council election: Cook Ward
Party	Candidate	Votes	%	±%
Independent	David Jones (elected)			
Independent	F. Mitchell (elected)			
Independent	H. Hollingshed (elected)			
Independent	W. Pawley (elected)			

=== Gipps ===
1842 Sydney City Council election: Gipps Ward
Party	Candidate	Votes	%	±%
Independent	Chapman	320		
Independent	Jones	226		
Independent	Egan	221		
Independent	Peacock	182		
Independent	Nicholson	117		
Independent	Moore	100		
Independent	Ryan	77		
Independent	Coyle	58		
Independent	Taylor	1		
Independent	Gannon	0		

=== Macquarie ===
1842 Sydney City Council election: Macquarie Ward
Party	Candidate	Votes	%	±%
Independent	George Hill	325		
Independent	Holt	287		
Independent	Henry Macdermott	239		
Independent	Thomas Broughton	238		
Independent	Bourne	122		
Independent	Woolley	105		
Independent	Thompson	95		
Independent	Wyatt	75		

=== Phillip ===
1842 Sydney City Council election: Phillip Ward
Party	Candidate	Votes	%	±%
Independent	Edward Flood	295		
Independent	James Robert Wilshire	269		
Independent	Neale	222		
Independent	Taylor	203		
Independent	Blackman	187		
Independent	Wallace	115		
Independent	Hayes	69		
Independent	Grose	33		
