= Samuel Walder =

Australian politician

The Honourable Sir Samuel Walder
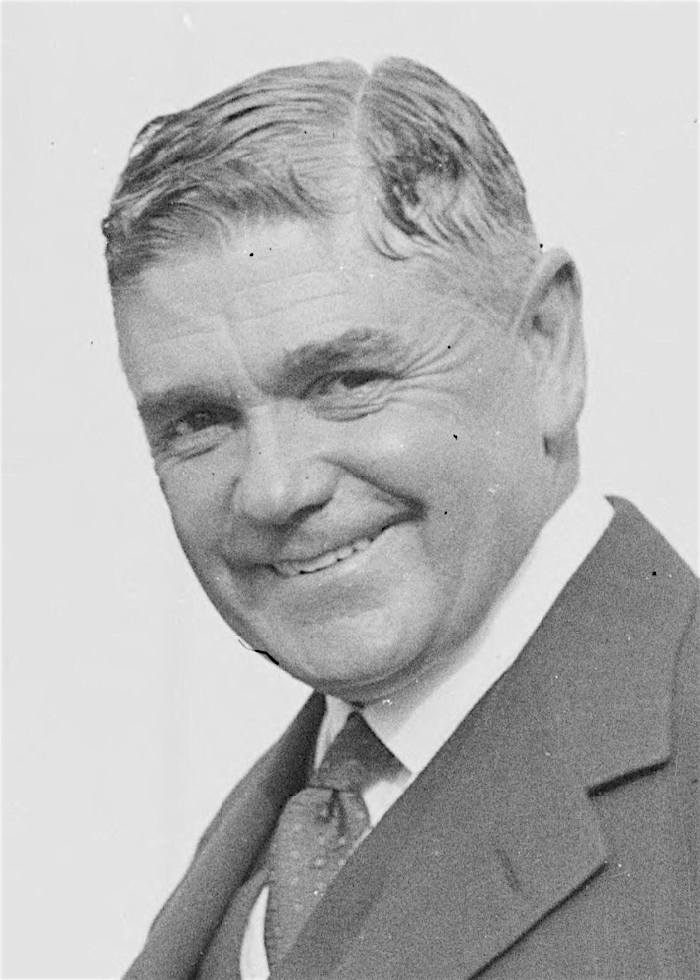

59th Lord Mayor of Sydney
- In office 1 January 1932 – 31 December 1932
- Preceded by: Joseph Jackson
- Succeeded by: Richard Hagon

Alderman of the Sydney City Council
- In office 1 December 1924 – 31 December 1927
- In office 18 June 1930 – 5 December 1941

Member of the New South Wales Legislative Council
- In office 8 September 1932 – 22 April 1943

Personal details
- Born: Samuel Robert Walder; 8 October 1879 Sydney, New South Wales, Australia
- Died: 24 November 1946 (aged 67) Woollahra, New South Wales, Australia
- Party: Nationalist / United Australia
- Other political affiliations: Civic Reform Association
- Spouse: Elsie Blunt (m. 1911)
- Relations: William McMahon (nephew); John Human (son-in-law)
- Children: 1

Sir Samuel Robert Walder (8 October 1879 – 24 November 1946) was an Australian businessman and politician. He was a long-serving member of the Sydney City Council, including as Lord Mayor of Sydney in 1932, and was also a member of the New South Wales Legislative Council from 1932 to 1943.

== Early life and business career ==
Samuel Robert Walder was born in Sydney on 8 October 1879, the son of Mary Ann (Hatton) and Samuel Walder, a sail-maker. After being educated at Cleveland Street Public School and Christ Church St Laurence Parish School, he left school at age 13 and entered his father's sail, tent and tarpaulin manufacturing business as an apprentice. When his father died, the 18-year-old Walder took over as manager. He expanded the business and floated it as a Limited company, S. Walder Ltd, in 1911. On 22 March 1911 he married Elsie Helena Blunt, a milliner, at St Martin's Anglican Church, Kensington. They had two children together, Mollie and Samuel; Mollie married the English cricketer John Human. After the death of his sister Mary in 1917, Walder and his wife helped raise his nephew William McMahon, who would eventually become Prime Minister of Australia. He was the chief paternal influence on McMahon, whose own father was absent.

During the First World War, Walder's company obtained a government contract to supply tents to the Australian Army. With the success of his company, Walder expanded his business activities, becoming a director of the local board of Eagle Star and British Dominions Fire Insurance Company, Lowe Brothers, Monsoon Waterproofing Company and as the chairman of directors of Sargents Limited. In 1924 he retired as managing director of S. Walder Ltd, which remained a family company.

== Political career ==
=== Sydney City Council ===
Walder was a prominent member of the Sydney community, being a member of the Sydney Chamber of Manufactures, Chamber of Commerce, and the Master Retailers Association. He was also a director of Royal Prince Alfred Hospital from 1933 to 1935 and a member of the Rotary Club of Sydney. In December 1924, Walder was elected to the Sydney City Council at a by-election for Flinders Ward, standing for the Civic Reform Association. His first term as an alderman lasted until 1927, when the council was dismissed, but when the council returned in 1930 he was elected for Macquarie Ward. He was the secretary of the Citizens' Reform Association from 1925 to 1941.

On 9 December 1931, Walder was elected by the council as Lord Mayor of Sydney, noting that he had "realised the ambition of my life". Taking office in 1932, Walder led the council during the worst year of the Great Depression and chaired the Citizens' Employment Committee, which assisted citizens in obtaining employment. The civic improvements and events undertaken during his tenure included the extension of Martin Place to Macquarie Street, the unveiling of the Archibald Fountain on 14 March 1932 and the opening of the Sydney Harbour Bridge on 19 March 1932. On 2 January 1933, he was made a Knight Bachelor for his service as Lord Mayor.

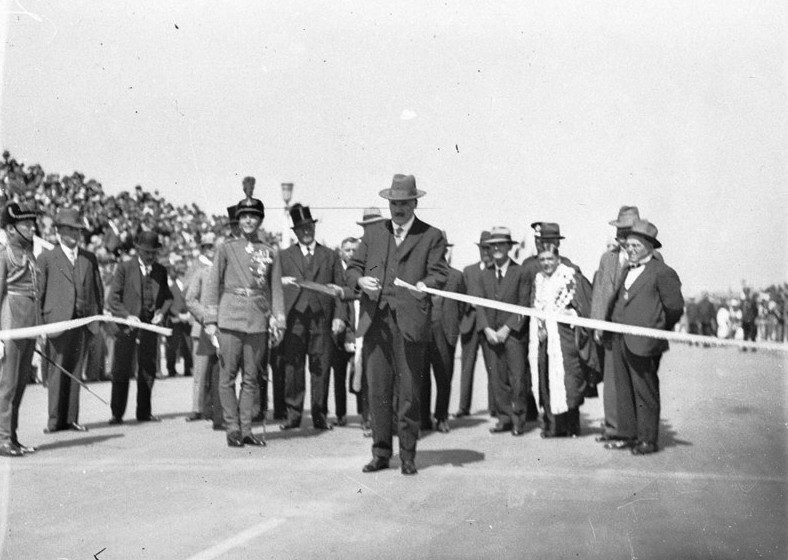
The opening of the Sydney Harbour Bridge on 19 March 1932, Premier Lang cuts the ribbon with Walder (right, in robes) looking on.

During World War II, Walder chaired Sydney City Council's National Emergency Services committee, advocating the construction of underground air-raid shelters and other measures preparing for possible attack. He served as an alderman until his retirement in December 1941.

=== State politics ===
As Lord Mayor, Walder was given a life appointment to the New South Wales Legislative Council from 8 September 1932. However, with the abolition of life appointments and the introduction of indirect elections to the council in 1933, Walder was elected as a member on 21 November 1933. An active philanthropist along with his wife, in 1933 he donated £100 towards an initiative to build houses for the financially distressed. As a vice-president of the liberal conservative National Association of New South Wales in 1930 and a member of the committee that negotiated the creation of the United Australia Party, of which he was a vice-president in 1933–1939, Walder sat for the UAP in the Legislative Council until his defeat in April 1943. Survived by his wife, son and daughter, he died of cancer on 24 November 1946 at Woollahra and was buried in Waverley Cemetery.

Civic offices
Preceded by Joseph Jackson	Lord Mayor of Sydney; 1932	Succeeded by Richard Hagon
