= Kearsley Shire =

Former local government area in New South Wales, Australia

Kearsley Shire New South Wales
- Established: 7 March 1906
- Abolished: 1 January 1957
- Council seat: Cessnock
- Region: Hunter

Kearsley Shire was a local government area in the Hunter region of New South Wales, Australia.

Kearsley Shire was proclaimed (as Cessnock Shire) on 7 March 1906, one of 134 shires created after the passing of the Local Government (Shires) Act 1905.

The shire's name and boundaries were often changed. The Municipality of Cessnock was excised from the Shire on 1 November 1926. The balance of the Shire was renamed Kearsley Shire. The shire absorbed the Municipality of Greta on 1 January 1934. On 6 June 1944, part of the shire merged with Tarro Shire and Bolwarra Shire to form Lower Hunter Shire, part merged with the Municipality of East Maitland, Municipality of West Maitland and Municipality of Morpeth to form the Municipality of Maitland and the balance reconstituted as Kearsley Shire.

The shire office was in Cessnock. Other towns and villages in the shire included Branxton, Greta and Kearsley.

Kearsley Shire amalgamated with the Municipality of Cessnock to form Municipality of Greater Cessnock on 1 January 1957.

== Council ==
Kearsley Shire Council was composed of four two-member wards (also known as ridings) − A Riding, B Riding, C Riding and D Riding.

At the 1944 election, the Communist Party of Australia (CPA) won a majority with five out of eight seats. According to the CPA's official newspaper, Tribune, this was the first time a communist party had won a local government majority in the English-speaking world.

Ahead of the 1947 local elections, the state Labor government introduced compulsory voting for local elections, seen as an attempt to give them an advantage and harm the Communist Party. Ultimately, no CPA members were re-elected in Kearsley (although their actual number of votes rose, their percent of the vote went down).

== Election results ==
=== 1944 ===
1944 New South Wales local elections: Kearsley
Party	Votes	%	Swing	Seats	Change
Communist	4,149	52.29	+52.29	5	▲5
Independent	3,084	38.86		2	
Labor	703	8.85		1	
Formal votes	7,936	100.0			
