= George Allen (Australian politician) =

Australian politician

The Honourable George Allen
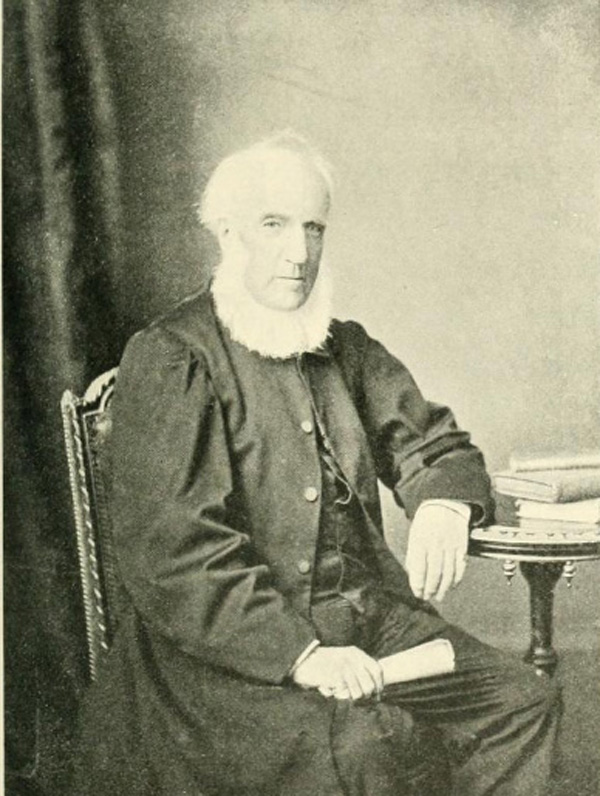
- George Allen c. 1860

Alderman for Bourke Ward
- In office 1 November 1842 – 31 December 1853

Personal details
- Born: 23 November 1800 London, England, United Kingdom
- Died: Glebe, New South Wales, Australia 3 November 1877 (aged 76)
- Spouse: Jane Bowden
- Children: 14, including George Wigram Allen

George Allen (23 November 1800 – 3 November 1877) was a British-born Australian colonial attorney and politician in New South Wales. He was the founder of Australia's oldest law firm, Allens.

== Early life ==
Allen was the second son of Mary and Dr. Richard Allen, physician to George III, and was born in London on 23 November 1800. Following his father's death, his mother wed Thomas Collicott in 1809. Collicott was convicted of fraud over revenue stamps and was transported to New South Wales on the Earl Spencer in October 1813. Mary applied for assistance to join her husband and arrived in Sydney with five children, including George, on the Mary Ann in January 1816.

Allen was intensely religious, joining the Methodist Society in 1821. He played a significant role in Sydney's Methodist community and the Temperance Society.

== Legal and commercial career ==
He was the first attorney and solicitor to receive his training in New South Wales and be admitted by the Supreme Court of New South Wales. This took place on 26 July 1822, which marks the establishment of the legal practice which became the international law firm Allens Allen encountered much difficulty in maintaining his status against the English-bred attorneys who desired to monopolise the practice.

In addition to conducting his legal practice, Allen was the founding director and solicitor of the Australian Gaslight Company in 1836, and was later solicitor, director and president of the Savings Bank of New South Wales.

== Public offices ==
He was elected an alderman for Bourke Ward on 1 November 1842 and presided over the first meeting of council on 9 November 1842. He served until 31 December 1853 when the council was dismissed, and the city was placed under the administration of a three-member commission.

Allen was mayor from November 1844 to November 1845. On 28 July 1846 he was appointed as a member of the first Legislative Council and served until its abolition in 1856. He was a member of the newly constituted Legislative Council from 22 May 1856 to 13 May 1861 and 3 September 1861 to 3 November 1877.his death on 3 November 1877.

He was appointed honorary Police Magistrate of the City and Port. In 1856 he became a member of the present Legislative Council, and was elected Chairman of Committees, but was forced by failing eyesight to resign that office in 1873, along with his membership of the Council of Education, which he had held since 1866. He assisted in founding Sydney College and held office on the governing body for many years. In 1859 he was elected a member of the Senate of Sydney University, to which be bequeathed £1000 for a scholarship for proficiency in mathematics in the second year.

== Marriage and family ==
He married Jane Bowden on 24 July 1823, and they had fourteen children but only five sons and five daughters survived past infancy. By 1831, Allen was the owner of three Sydney houses as well as a 30-acre (12-hectare) estate at Botany Bay. Toxteth Park in Glebe was a 96-acre (38.8-hectare) estate where the family lived until the death of the patriarch. The substantial home on the estate included a large library that housed a huge collection of books amassed by Allen:

- Their eldest son was George Wigram (16 May 1824 – 23 July 1885), also practiced as a solicitor, joining the business in 1847, becoming his father's partner and successor. As Sir George he was Speaker of the New South Wales Legislative Assembly from 1875 until 1883.
- Their youngest son was William Boyce (4 August 1848 – 9 June 1929). He was born at Toxteth Park and was educated at Dr. Pendrlll's School and from 1865 at Newington College at Newington House on the Parramatta River. Following school he raised cattle in the far-west of New South Wales and after returning to Sydney became one of the first sworn valuators under the Real Property Act. Allen and his wife, Adelaide (née Hamburger), had four daughters and two sons.

== Death ==
Allen, who was a prominent member of the Wesleyan-Methodist church, died at his home, Toxteth Park in Glebe, on 3 November 1877 (aged 76). He was buried at the old Wesleyan Cemetery at Rookwood. Upon his death, The Sydney Morning Herald referred to him as "one of the foremost public citizens, who overcame the temptation of successful men to live a life of easy self-indulgence".

The Toxteth Estate has long since been subdivided for inner-city housing. The name survives in the popular Toxteth Hotel in Glebe Point Road, the type of establishment so loathed by the pious Wesleyan.

New South Wales Legislative Council
New office	Chairman of Committees; 1856–1873	Succeeded by Joseph Docker
