= Susan Francis =

Australian midwife and Labor Party supporter (1877 – 1946

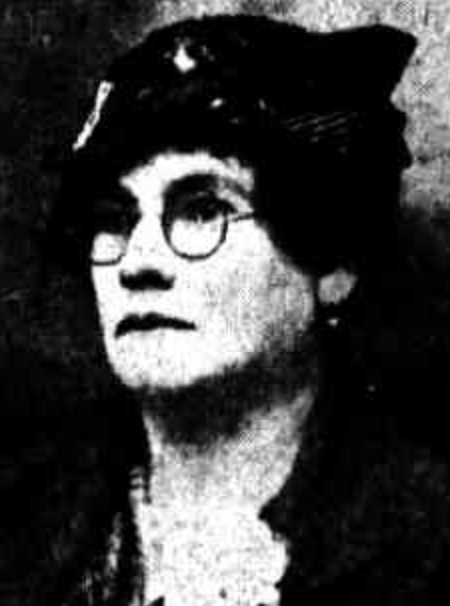

Susan Francis-Wilkes (née Radford; 14 October 1877 – 22 April 1946) was an Australian midwife and women's rights activist.

== Early life ==
Francis was born at Kelvin Grove in Brisbane to labourer William Radford and Selina, née Stapleton. On 20 February 1897 she married Arthur Rawlins, who was known as Francis. Susan came to Sydney around 1911 with two of their three living children, assuming the name "Tarrant" between 1915 and 1917.

== Career ==
From the 1920s Francis worked as a midwife, although she never qualified with the Nurses' Registration Board and was the subject of two inquiries. She was also active in the Australian Labor Party, running for the state seat of Bondi in 1927. From 1928 to 1935 she was president then secretary of the Labor Women's Organising Committee; she was also a delegate to the Interstate Women's Conference in 1930 and president of the Blind Workers' Union in 1931. She ran for Waverley Municipal Council as a Lang Labor candidate in 1932, during which it emerged that she had been convicted in 1930 for witnessing false enrolment cards at the 1930 state election in Bondi.

Francis was involved in efforts to establish the Hostel for Homeless Women and Girls as secretary of a Labor committee. Well respected in the labour movement, her second marriage on 18 April 1936 to John Laurence Wilkes was preceded by a large function in her honour organised by a Labor committee; Jack Lang paid tribute to her in the annual party conference. Following this marriage she became known as Nurse Francis-Wilkes. She remained active in the local Labor Party until her death from myocardial infarction and diabetes on 22 April 1946 in Sydney. She was buried with Catholic rites in Botany cemetery.
