= Richard Hagon =

Australian politician

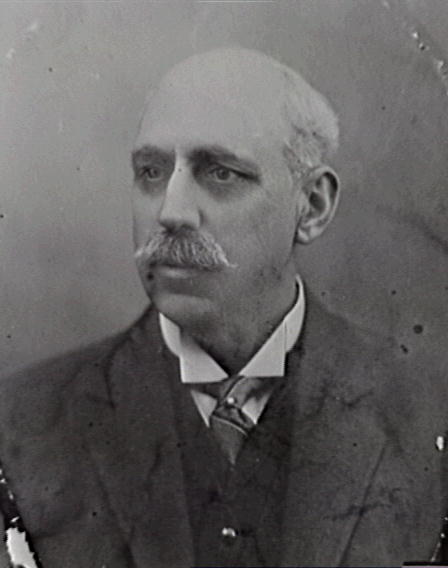
Hagon in 1916

Richard Charles Hagon (1 November 1855 – 10 December 1944) was an Australian independent politician who served as Lord Mayor of Sydney in 1933. A merchant tailor by profession, Hagon served his first term as an alderman for the City of Sydney from 1909 to 1924, and his second from 1930 until his resignation in 1935.

Hagon was born in Hobart Town, Van Diemen's Land. The colony was officially renamed Tasmania less than two months after his birth. He was married and had five children. On 10 December 1944, he died at his residence in Edgecliff, Sydney, aged 89. He was interred at Waverley Cemetery.

Civic offices
Preceded by Samuel Walder	Lord Mayor of Sydney; 1933	Succeeded by Alfred Parker
