= Reg Bartley =

Australian businessman and mayor

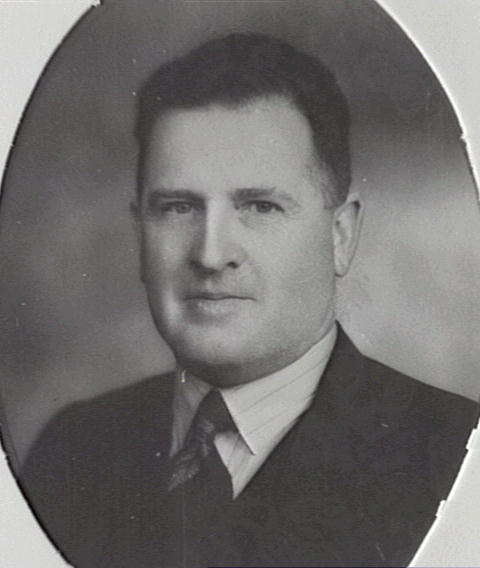
Alderman Reginald James Bartley (1941 - 1959) Lord Mayor 1943 - 1944, 1946 - 1948

Reginald James Bartley (3 February 1899 – 16 January 1982) was a businessman, company director and Lord Mayor of Sydney.

== Life ==
Born in Armidale, New South Wales on 3 February 1899, Bartley was the son of Henry and Annie P Bartley of Forbes. In 1929 he was admitted to the Supreme Court of New South Wales. Bartley was Lord Mayor of Sydney in 1943–1944 and 1946–1948. He was succeeded by Ernest Charles O'Dea. A Civic Reform Association member, Bartley was attacked by a member of the Communist Party of Australia over a proposal to demolish "Maramonah", a mansion in central Sydney, inhabited by 600 squatters, in order to lay out a park. Bartley's plan was eventually taken up, and the site of the mansion is Fitzroy Gardens in King's Cross. Bartley later said that he regretted the incident had become one between "communists and lawful authority".

In March 1946 Bartley was instrumental in moving to demolish the Sydney Mint and the Hyde Park Barracks, stating that they should "make way for modern structures".

Bartley died at Bellevue Hill on 16 January 1982.

== Legacy ==
Bartley's service to the City of Sydney is commemorated by the naming of Reg Bartley Oval at Rushcutters Bay, Reg Bartley XI Cricket Club and Bartley Street, Chippendale. The City of Sydney Florence Bartley Library was named in honour of Bartley's wife and Lady Mayoress Florence.

== Bibliography ==
- Bartley, Reg (1979). The Court is Open- A Guide to the Magistrates Court. Petty Publishing and Marianne Publishing.

Civic offices
Preceded by Stanley Crick	Lord Mayor of Sydney; 1943-1944	Succeeded by William Neville Harding
Preceded by William Neville Harding	Lord Mayor of Sydney; 1946-1948	Succeeded by Ernest Charles O'Dea
