= 1944 New South Wales local elections =

← 1941	2 December 1944	1947 →

The 1944 New South Wales local elections were held on 2 December 1944 to elect the councils of the 301 local government areas (LGAs) in New South Wales.

The Sydney Morning Herald noted that "little interest" was shown in the elections, with low turnout in the 163 municipalities and 138 shires − in some LGAs, turnout was as low as 25%.

A total of 16 members of the Australian Communist Party were elected − the party's best-ever result at a local, state or federal level. This included five Communists elected to Kearsley Shire Council, which gave the party a majority.

Other notable results included the re-election of the Civic Reform Association in Sydney, the Progressive Municipal Labor Party losing all of its seats in Cessnock, and 12 Lang Labor candidates (including nine incumbent aldermen) being defeated in Auburn.

== See also ==
- 1944 Kearsley Shire Council election
- 1944 Sydney City Council election
