= William Neville Harding =

Australian politician (1893–1978)

William Harding
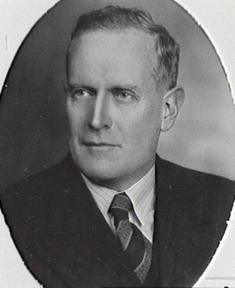

67th Lord Mayor of Sydney
- In office 1 January 1945 – 31 December 1945
- Preceded by: Reg Bartley
- Succeeded by: Reg Bartley

Alderman of the Sydney City Council
- In office 29 July 1935 – 31 December 1948

Chairman of the Sydney County Council
- In office 20 January 1942 – 19 January 1943
- Deputy: Stanley Parry
- Preceded by: Stanley Parry
- Succeeded by: Stanley Parry

Personal details
- Born: 4 January 1893 Sydney, Colony of New South Wales
- Died: 31 March 1978 (aged 85) Wollstonecraft, New South Wales, Australia
- Party: Citizens' Reform Association; Democratic Party; Liberal Party
- Spouse: Constance Algilvie
- Children: David Bruce Harding (1918-1943); Ian Grant Harding; 1 Daughter

William Neville Harding (4 January 1893 – 31 March 1978) was a Taxation accountant, company director and New South Wales local government politician who was Lord Mayor of Sydney and an Alderman of the Sydney City Council from 1935 to 1948.

== Early years and background ==
William Neville Harding was born in Sydney, Colony of New South Wales, on 4 January 1893, the son of William and Agnes Harding. Harding was educated at the University of Sydney and became a public accountant specialising in taxation, and a company director. On 3 August 1918 he married Constance Agilvie and had two sons and one daughter. From 1911 he was employed as a manager in his father's accountancy firm, but was dismissed in 1928 and later sued his father for unlawful dismissal. In 1929 a jury found in favour of Harding and awarded him £2000 in damages; however, his father appealed and the case was later settled out of court.

== Political career ==
A prominent member of the Sydney business community, later rising to be president of the Electrical and Radio Development Association of NSW in 1941 and 1942, Harding joined the conservative, business-oriented Citizens' Reform Association. He first stood for the Sydney City Council at the municipal elections in December 1934 for Phillip Ward but was unsuccessful against Labor Party candidates Paddy Stokes and Ernest Charles O'Dea. However, when Alderman Richard Hagon retired from the council in July 1935 Harding stood as the Reform Association candidate at the resulting by-election in Macquarie Ward.

Elected on 29 July, Harding was a member of the Works and the Health and by-laws committees but dedicated most of his time towards the Finance Committee, serving in 1937, 1942–45 and 1946–48 and was the committee Vice-Chairman in 1942–44. Working on the consolidation at development of Sydney's electricity supplies, Harding served as a Councillor on the recently established Sydney County Council from 1938 to 1944 and was its Chairman in 1942. In 1937, aware of the inadequate facilities of the City of Sydney Library located in the Queen Victoria Building, Alderman Harding put forward an ambitious proposal to council for the construction and development of a new city library building, complete with a museum and civic theatre. His plan however was not carried out due to the outbreak of war.

During World War II he served on Sydney City Council's National Emergency Services committee from 1942 to 1945, advocating the construction of underground air-raid shelters and other measures preparing for possible attack. His son, Private David Bruce Harding (who attended Sydney Church of England Grammar School, 1930-1935) of 2/17th Battalion died on active service in the Salamaua–Lae campaign on 10 October 1943. At the May 1944 state election Harding stood as the Democratic Party candidate for the seat of North Sydney but was unsuccessful against Labor's James Geraghty.

On 12 December 1944 Harding was elected by the council to serve as Lord Mayor from 1 January 1945 receiving 12 votes against Labor candidate Alderman O'Dea who received 8 votes. On his election Harding acknowledged his opponent and pledged to keep the council free of party politics while affirming the Reform Association's commitment to keep rates low while maintaining effective municipal services. On 29 January 1945, Harding as Lord Mayor welcomed the Duke and Duchess of Gloucester to Sydney and Australia in anticipation of the Duke's appointment as Governor General of Australia.

== Later life ==
In 1946 Harding attempted gain Liberal Party of Australia preselection for the seat of Parramatta at the 1946 federal election but later withdrew. He served as an Alderman until his retirement in December 1948. In 1949 Harding was fined £40 for failure to file a tax return for 1947 and while he was described by a Taxation Office official as having "caused the department a great deal of trouble", Harding's solicitor noted in court that "Harding had been at death's door and was more than five months in hospital. Many of his staff had left him." and that "[o]f two of his lads who went to the war, one was killed and one is a hopeless case." Survived by his wife, son and daughter, he died on 31 March 1978 at his residence on Belmont Avenue, Wollstonecraft.

Government offices
Preceded by Stanley Parry	Chairman of the Sydney County Council; 1942 – 1943	Succeeded by Stanley Parry
Civic offices
Preceded by Reg Bartley	Lord Mayor of Sydney; 1945	Succeeded by Reg Bartley
