= Blind Workers' Union of Victoria =

Trade union in Australia

BWU
- Blind Workers' Union of Victoria
- Headquarters: Prahran, Victoria
- Location: Australia
- Key people: Martin Stewart, president
- Affiliations: ACTU

The Blind Workers' Union of Victoria (BWU) is a trade union in Australia. It is affiliated with the Australian Council of Trade Unions. The union represents vision-impaired workers and campaigns against the marginalization of blind and disabled workers.

In 2013, the union organized protests against the closure of Vision Australia Enterprises (VAE), a program that provided manual labor jobs to visually impaired individuals, highlighting the devastating impact on 73 workers, many of whom also had additional disabilities.
