= 1947 New South Wales local elections =

← 1944	6 December 1947	1950 →

The 1947 New South Wales local elections were held on 6 December 1947 to elect the councils of the local government areas (LGAs) in New South Wales.

This was the first time that voting in local elections was compulsory. The reforms were introduced by the state Labor government, seen as an attempt to give them an advantage and harm the Australian Communist Party (who had 16 candidates elected in 1944).

The majority of Communist councillors elected in 1944 were defeated, including all five on Kearsley Shire Council, where the party had held a majority.

The election for Sydney City Council was delayed by a year until 1948.
