= Horace Foley =

Australian politician and medical practitioner

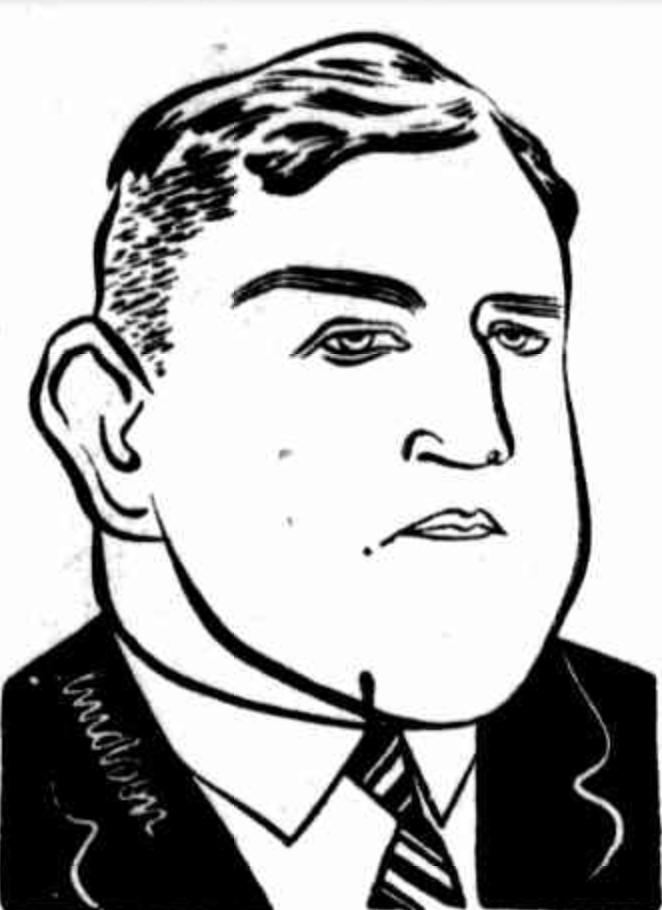
Horace John Foley, 1945 cartoon

Horace John Foley (23 November 1900 – 3 July 1989) was an Australian medical practitioner and mayor of Glebe.

Foley was born at Mudgee to schoolteacher James Foley and Margaret Mary (née English). He attended Mudgee High School before studying medicine at the University of Sydney, from which he graduated in 1926. He practised first at Strathfield before moving to Glebe, where he worked for the rest of his career. He married Sarah Agnes May Farmer at St Joseph's Catholic Church in Rockdale on 23 November 1932.

Foley was a member of the Labor Party, and supported Premier Jack Lang in the 1930s split. He ran unsuccessfully for the state seat of Burwood in 1932 before winning election to Glebe Council in December 1934, serving as mayor in 1937 and 1938. He clashed with Lang and in December 1937 led his own group, the "Foley Labor Party", which defeated Lang's forces at the municipal elections. In 1938 he ran for the state seat of Glebe for the Industrial Labor Party, which opposed Lang.

Foley was convicted in 1938 of misusing council vehicles; he was fined and disqualified from sitting on the council. Lang's second splinter party, the Australian Labor Party (Non-Communist) (after 1941 simply Lang Labor), appealed to Foley's anti-communist leanings and he ran federally for West Sydney in 1943 and 1949 and for the state seat of King in 1944, 1947 and 1950. He was elected to Sydney City Council at a 1945 by-election for Phillip Ward and Glebe Council in 1947; when the two amalgamated, Foley's Lang Labor ticket defeated the official Labor group for the Glebe seats. He resigned from the council in 1950 but served again 1953–56.

Foley rejoined the ALP in 1957 and soon gained control of the branch of Glebe North, analogous to the branch he had controlled in the 1930s. He was a councillor on Hornsby Shire Council from 1962 to 1965 and served for the Glebe ward on Leichhardt Municipal Council from 1968 to 1971. Remembered as a socially conservative Catholic in a working-class community, Foley has a park named after him in Glebe. He died at Croydon in 1989 and was buried in Rookwood Cemetery. In 1964, the Sydney City Council renamed the Glebe Rest Park as the "Dr H J Foley Rest Park" in his honour.

Civic offices
Preceded by Stephen McCormack	Mayor of The Glebe; 1936 – 1938	Succeeded by Stephen McCormack
