= Civic Reform Association =

- Founded: 20 January 1920
- Dissolved: c. 1991
- Ideology: Australian conservatism

The Civic Reform Association (CRA), also known as the Civic Reform Movement, the Civic Reform Party or simply Reform, was an Australian ratepayers' organisation and local political party which contested elections for the City of Sydney.

The party was formed as the Citizens' Reform Association by approximately seventy people at the Sydney Town Hall on 20 January 1920. Its aim was to remove the administration of the City of Sydney from the control of the Australian Labor Party.

In 1960, the party officially changed its name to the Civic Reform Association.

The following members of the association served in the ensuing years as Lord Mayor of Sydney: David Gilpin 1923–1924; Ernest Marks 1930, Joseph Jackson 1931, Sir Samuel Walder 1932; Sir Alfred Parker 1934–1935; Archibald Howie 1936–1937; Stanley Crick 1940–1942; Reg Bartley 1943–1944 & 1946–1948; William Neville Harding 1945; Sir Emmet McDermott 1969–1972; David Griffin 1972–1973; Sir Nicholas Shehadie 1973–1975; Leo Port 1975–1978; Nelson Meers 1978–1980; and Hugh Dixson 1988-1989 Jeremy Bingham 1989–1991. Parker Henson served as Chairman of the Sydney County Council. Alex Rigby served as president from 1971 until 1973.

== Electoral results ==
Election year	# of overall votes	% of overall vote	# of overall seats won	+/–	Council control (term)
1941			12 / 20		Civic Reform majority
1944	4,032	34.44			Civic Reform majority
