= Ernest Charles O'Dea =

Australian politician (1889–1976)

The Honourable Ernest Charles O'Dea
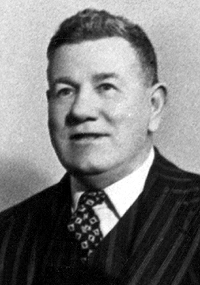

69th Lord Mayor of Sydney
- In office 1 January 1949 – 9 December 1952
- Deputy: John James Carroll; Jack Byrne
- Preceded by: Reg Bartley
- Succeeded by: Pat Hills

Member of the New South Wales Legislative Council
- In office 23 April 1943 – 22 April 1967

Personal details
- Born: 19 February 1889 Armidale, Colony of New South Wales
- Died: 21 November 1976 (aged 87) Gladesville, New South Wales, Australia
- Party: ALP

Ernest Charles O'Dea (19 February 1889 – 21 November 1976) was an Australian trade union official, Labor Party politician, Lord Mayor of Sydney and Member of the New South Wales Parliament.

== Early life ==
O'Dea was born in Armidale in 1889 and moved to Sydney with his family as a child.

== Career ==
O'Dea entered the retail trade and moved rapidly through the trade union ranks whilst in his twenties. He served as a Sydney Municipal Council Alderman for two periods (1924–1927 and 1930–1965) and was elected Lord Mayor of Sydney in 1948 for four years. He served two twelve-year terms in the New South Wales Legislative Council between 1942 and 1967. He was also a member of Sydney County Council between 1935 and 1959 and its chairman from 1958 to 1959.

He was an advocate of compulsory unionism and equal pay, and was an opponent of Saturday retail trading and late-night shopping, all major issues in the 1950s and 1960s. He was a vehement anti-communist and fought against communist influence in trade unions and other industrial organisations.

== Later life ==
O'Dea died in 1976 at St George Hospital in Sydney, after suffering a cerebral aneurysm in 1966. He was survived by a son from his first marriage and a son and stepdaughter of his second marriage.

== Legacy ==
O'Dea is remembered by O'Dea Avenue in Zetland and O'Dea Park in Camperdown.

Civic offices
Preceded by Reg Bartley	Lord Mayor of Sydney; 1948 – 1952	Succeeded by Pat Hills
Government offices
Preceded by Frank Joyce	Chairman of the Sydney County Council; 1958 – 1959	Succeeded by William Murray
