= Communist Party of Australia =

Political party in Australia (1920–1991)

Communist Party of Australia (1920–1944; 1951–1991) Australian Communist Party (1944–1951)
- Abbreviation: CPA; ACP
- Founder: Jock Garden; Tom Walsh; William Earsman; Adela Pankhurst; Christian Jollie Smith; Katharine Susannah Prichard
- Founded: 30 October 1920
- Registered: 19 October 1984
- Legalised: 18 December 1942
- Banned: 15 June 1940
- Succeeded by: Socialist Party of Australia (1971) (Note: Breaking away in 1971, the Socialist Party renamed to the Communist Party of Australia in 1996, five years after the dissolution of its predecessor.)
- Headquarters: Marx House, Sydney (Note: The headquarters of the Communist Party had moved several times of the course of the party's history, however the location at the time of its peak membership, and activity, was "Marx House", Sydney.)
- Newspaper: • The Australian Communist; • The Communist; • Workers' Weekly; • Tribune
- Youth wing: Eureka Youth League
- Paramilitary wing: Workers' Defence Corps (1929–1935)
- Membership (1945): 22,052
- Ideology: Before 1971: Communism; Marxism–Leninism; After 1971: Anti-Stalinism; Eurocommunism
- Political position: Before 1971: Far-left; After 1971: Left-wing
- International affiliation: Comintern (1921–1943)
- Colours: Red
- Slogan: "All power to the workers"
- Anthem: The Internationale
- Party branches: Queensland
- Queensland Parliament: 1 / 62 (1944–1950)

De facto flag used in the 1940s–50s

The Communist Party of Australia (CPA), known as the Australian Communist Party (ACP) from 1944 to 1951, was an Australian communist party founded in 1920. The party existed until roughly 1991, with its membership and influence having been in a steady decline since its peak in 1945. Like most communist parties in the West, the party was heavily involved in the labour movement and the trade unions. Its membership, popularity and influence grew significantly during most of the interwar period before reaching its climax in 1945, where the party obtained a membership of slightly above 22,000 members. At its peak it was the largest communist party in the Anglophone countries on a population basis, and held industrial strength greater than the parties of "India, Latin America, and most of Western Europe".

Although the party did not elect a federal MP, Fred Paterson was elected to the Parliament of Queensland (for Bowen) at the 1944 state election. He won re-election in 1947 before the seat was abolished. The party also held office in over a dozen local government areas across New South Wales and Queensland.

After nineteen years of activity, the CPA was formally banned on 15 June 1940 under the relatively new Menzies government (1939–1941). The party was banned under the National Security (Subversive Associations) Regulations 1940. Two-and-a-half years later, the party was again a lawful organisation. When the party contested the federal election eight months later, it received its biggest vote total. Getting a total of 81,816 votes (1.93–2.00%), the party received over 20,000 in Victoria and Queensland, and over 19,000 in New South Wales. It was the party's biggest vote total since the 1934 federal election. However, by the late 1960s the party fell into single digit numbers before a brief spike in the mid-1970s. In the mid-to-late 1980s, the party was effectively stagnant and was dissolved in 1989. To the present, the party is the fourth-oldest political party in Australian political history since Federation, lasting for 70 years, 122 days.

== History ==
=== Foundation and early years ===
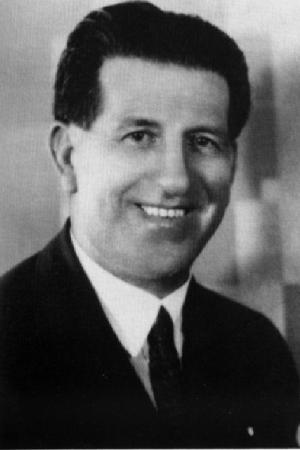
Jock Garden, Communist Party of Australia co-founder in 1920

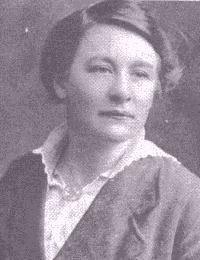
Adela Pankhurst, Communist Party of Australia co-founder in 1920

The Communist Party of Australia (CPA) was founded at the Australian Socialist Party Hall in Sydney on 30 October 1920 socialists inspired by reports of the Russian Revolution. The estimates for attendees at the founding ranges from below thirteen (Alistair Davidson) to twenty-six (Stuart Macintyre). Sixty invitations were issued. Groups included the Australian Socialist Party (ASP), some members from the Victorian Socialist Party (although the party itself did not join), as well as a variety of militant trade unionists. Among the party's founders were prominent Sydney trade unionists, Jock Garden, Tom Walsh, and William Paisley Earsman, and suffragettes and anti-conscriptionists including Adela Pankhurst (daughter of the British suffragist Emmeline Pankhurst), Christian Jollie Smith and Katharine Susannah Prichard.

Most of the then illegal Australian section of the Industrial Workers of the World (IWW) joined, but the IWW soon left the Communist Party, with its original members, over disagreements with the direction of the Soviet Union and Bolshevism. In its early years, mainly through Garden's efforts, the party achieved some influence in the trade union movement in New South Wales, but by the mid-1920s it had dwindled to an insignificant group.

A visits to the 1924 New Zealand conference by CPA executive members Hetty and Hector Ross got the (also small) Communist Party of New Zealand (CPNZ) agreeing to temporary affiliation with the CPA, and were followed by visits in 1925 by Harry Quaife, and by Norman Jeffery a bow-tie wearing former "Wobbly" (IWW member).

Garden and other communists were expelled from the Labor Party (ALP) in 1924. The CPA ran candidates including Garden (for Sydney) at the 1925 New South Wales state election in working-class seats against the ALP but was decisively defeated. This prompted Garden to leave the party in 1926 and return to the Labor Party. The leadership of the party went to Jack Kavanagh, an experienced Canadian communist activist who had moved to Australia in 1925, and Esmonde Higgins, a talented Melbourne journalist who was the nephew of then-High Court Justice, H. B. Higgins.

In 1929 the party leadership fell into disfavour with the Communist International (Comintern), which under orders from Joseph Stalin had taken a turn to radical revolutionary rhetoric (the so-called "Third Period"). After allowing party member Bert Moxon in Queensland to organise Communist candidates for the 1929 Queensland state election, the CPA leadership refused to do the same for the 1929 Australian federal election and instead supported the ALP, leading the Comintern to denounce the party's relationship to the ALP as 'opportunist'. In December 1929, a new party leadership including Moxon, Jack Miles, Lance Sharkey and Richard Dixon was elected in response to these denunciations, and began a period of strict centralisation and obedience to Moscow. Kavanagh was expelled in 1930 and Higgins resigned, and an emissary of the Comintern, the American communist Harry M. Wicks, was sent to correct the party's perceived errors. Though Moxon was removed as national secretary by the end of 1930 and later expelled from the party's central committee entirely, Miles and then Sharkey would lead the party until 1965.

In the 1930s, the CPA began a campaign to create mass organisations to organise militancy in the working-class, known as 'fraternal organisations' or 'fronts'. These organisations were nominally independent of the party and often included prominent non-communist office-holders, but were dominated by the CPA and its members who served as the organisers for them. Among these was the Unemployed Workers Movement, founded in 1930, which at its height had 30,000 members and was infamous nationally for its anti-eviction campaign in Sydney.

During this period the party experienced some growth, particularly after 1935 when the Comintern changed its policy in favour of a "united front against fascism". The Movement Against War and Fascism (MAWF) was founded to bring together all opponents of fascism under a communist controlled umbrella organisation. The movement instigated the events which led to the attempted exclusion of Egon Kisch from Australia in late 1934 and early 1935. Alongside this, the CPA formed the Workers Defence Corps (WDC).

The CPA was the first Australian political party to make a commitment to Aboriginal rights, which were included in its manifesto from 1931 onwards. The CPA, discussing in great detail the abuses suffered by Aboriginals, published a lengthy list of demands, calling for "full economic, political and social rights" for Aboriginal people.

=== Rise during World War II and the Labor United Front ===
The Communist Party began to win positions in trade unions during the 1930s, with party members taking the national leadership of the Federated Ironworkers' Association, the Miners' Federation and the Waterside Workers' Federation (WWF), as well as positions in other smaller unions or regional branches. At the same time, only a small minority of union members were themselves communists so these officials relied on the support of other militant unionists and the broader membership to maintain and exercise leadership, and the CPA's parliamentary candidates nearly always polled poorly at elections. The party also set up an organization of the unemployed to resist evictions. Activists from the party joined the International Brigades to defend the Second Republic against Francisco Franco's troops, and instigated an industrial campaign by the WWF to ban shipments of scrap iron to Japan in 1938. Throughout this time, members of the CPA were under constant surveillance by police and intelligence forces and harassed by the courts.

In 1939, after Soviet efforts to contain Nazi aggression through co-operation and alliance with France and Britain were rejected by the French and British, Nazi Germany and the Soviet Union signed a Non-Aggression Treaty. Despite ideological opposition between the countries, the USSR agreed not to engage in hostilities against Germany at the outbreak of World War II (Australia declared war on Nazi Germany for invading Poland). Consequently, the Communist Party of Australia opposed and sought to disrupt Australia's war effort against Germany in the early stages of the war under orders of the Comintern on the grounds that it was a war between imperialist nations, and not in the interests of the working class. Menzies banned the CPA after the fall of France in 1940, but by 1941 Stalin was forced to join the allied cause when Hitler reneged on the Pact and invaded the USSR. The USSR came to bear the brunt of the carnage of Hitler's war machine and the Communist Party in Australia lost its early war stigma as a result.

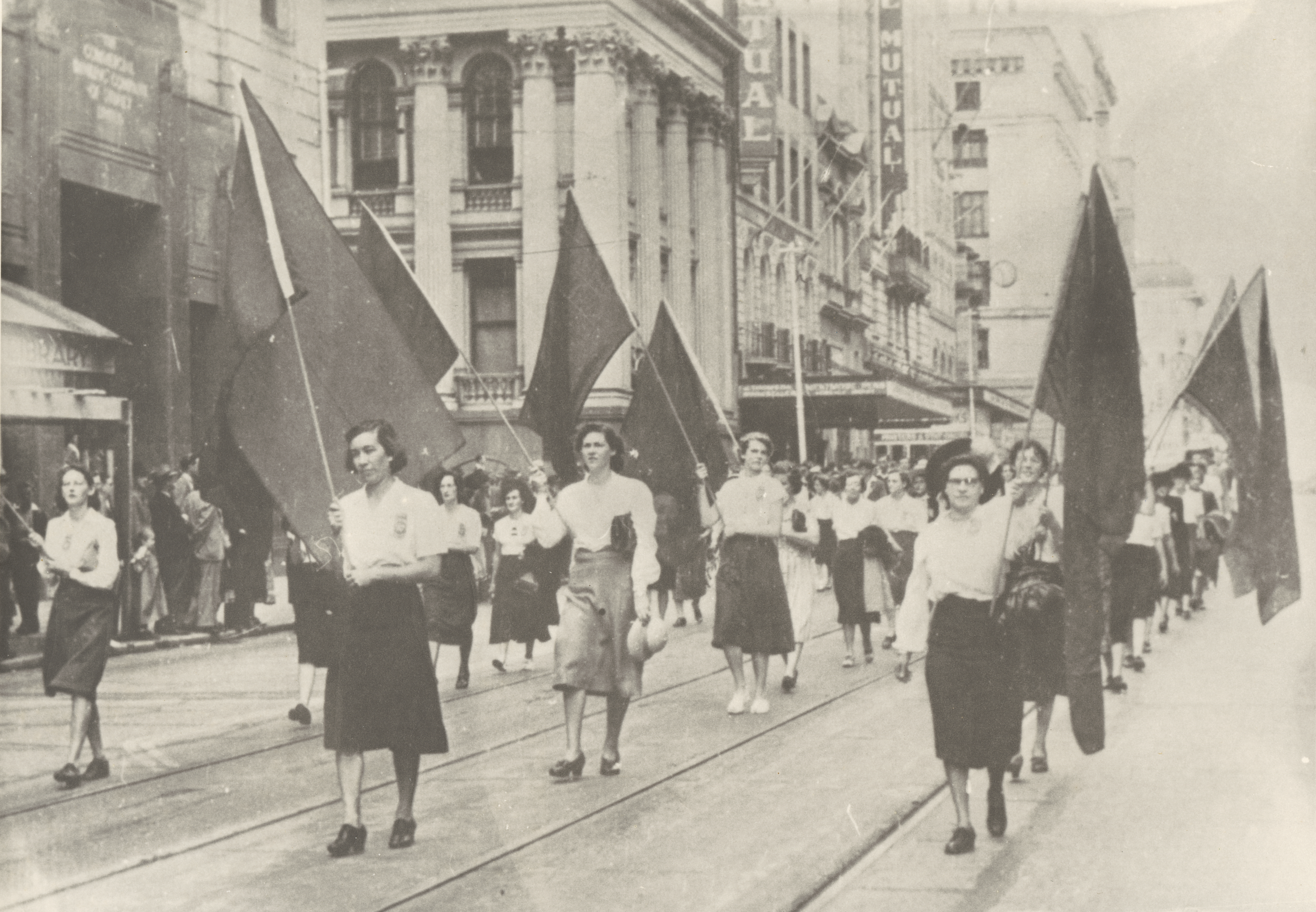
Women members of the Communist Party leading the May Day march in Brisbane, 1944.

Following the invasion of the Soviet Union, the CPA shifted towards a collaborative United front approach to the Labor Party to fully support the Australian war effort against fascism. Party members held discussions with senior Labor ministers following the Curtin government entering office in 1941, pledging to provide full support to mobilise resources for the war effort. The CPA supported calls for conscription, increased working hours, condemned strike action in war industries, and minimised criticism of John Curtin and his government. By 1942, the Curtin government legalised the CPA, exempted communist trade union and party officials from conscription, and provided the party's newspaper Tribune with a 'generous newsprint allocation' under wartime paper rationing.

During the united front period, the CPA's membership rose to 20,000, it won control of a number of important trade unions, and a Communist candidate, Fred Paterson, was elected to the Queensland parliament. The Communist Party achieved a majority of seats in the New South Wales' Kearsley Shire from 1944 to 1947. The Shire was committed to municipal socialism, advocating nationalisation of electricity and the expansion of the social wage, and was unique for its commitment to activism around federal and international affairs. The council notably rejected visits from the Governor of New South Wales, and criticised Britain for not supporting the Greek People's Liberation Army. But the party remained marginal to the Australian political mainstream. The Australian Labor Party remained the dominant party of the Australian left.

=== Postwar ===
After 1945 and the onset of the Cold War, the party entered a steady decline. Following the new line from Moscow, and believing that a new "imperialist war" and a new depression were imminent, and that the CPA should immediately contest for leadership of the working class with the Australian Labor Party, the CPA launched an industrial offensive in 1947, culminating in a prolonged strike in the coal mines in 1949. The Chifley Labor government saw this as a communist challenge to its position in the labour movement, and used the army and strikebreakers to break the strike. The Communist Party never again held such a strong position in the union movement.

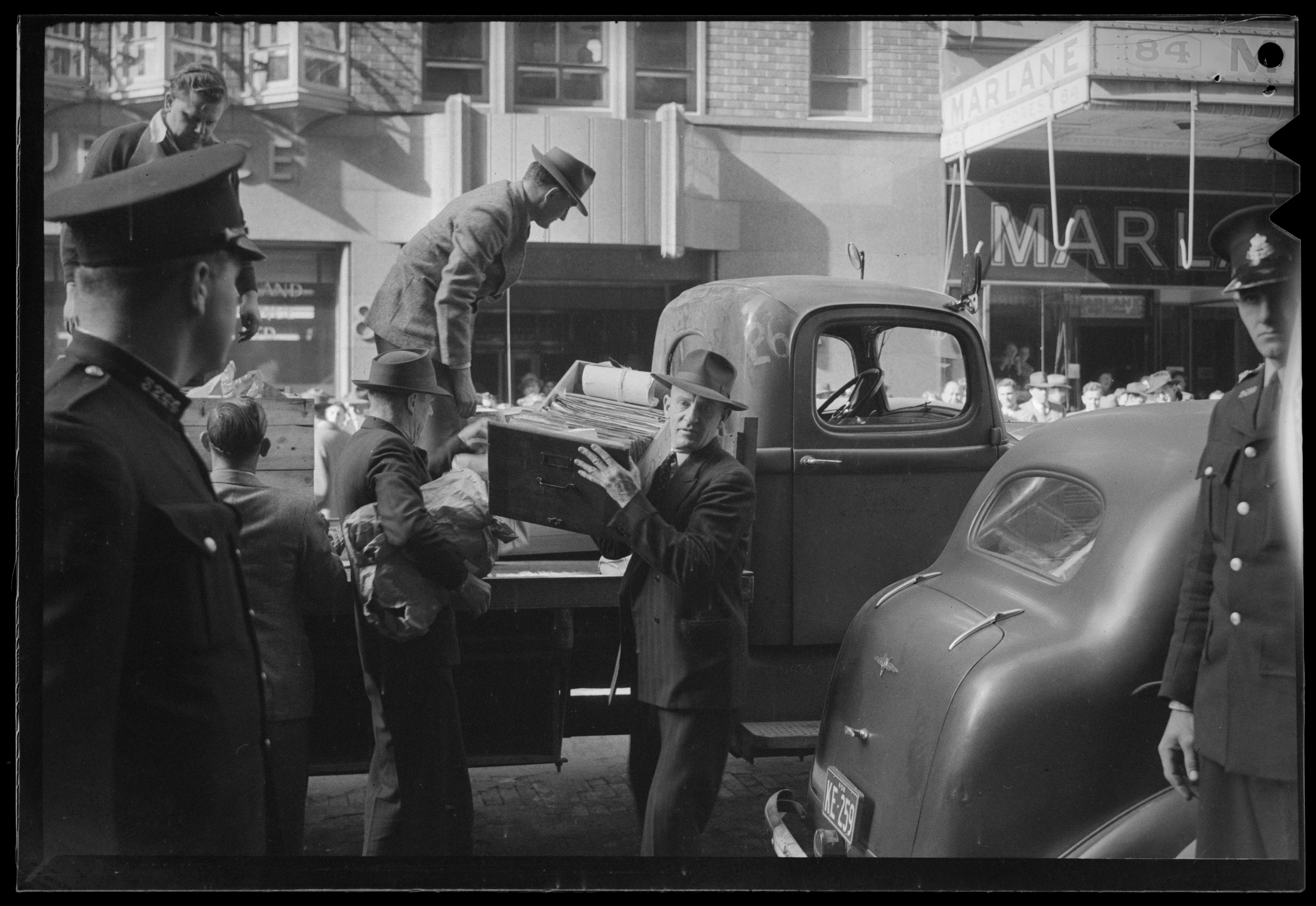
Police raid, Marx House, Communist Party Headquarters, Sydney, 8 July 1949

In 1949, Victoria commenced a 154-day royal commission into the state branch of the CPA, the USSR detonated its first atomic bomb and Mao Zedong gained control in China. A year later, North Korea invaded South Korea and in 1951, during the Korean War, the Liberal government of Robert Menzies tried to ban the Communist Party of Australia, first by legislation that was declared invalid by the High Court, then by referendum to try to overcome the constitutional obstacles to that legislation. The 1951 referendum was opposed by the Communist Party as well as the Australian Labor Party, and was narrowly defeated. The issue of communist influence in the unions remained potent and led to the Australian Labor Party split of 1955 and the formation of the Democratic Labor Party comprising disaffected ALP members who were concerned over communist influence in Australian unions.

==== Internal division and defections ====
In 1956, three years after Stalin died, Soviet leader Nikita Khrushchev gave the Secret Speech, denouncing Stalin and Stalinism as fostering a cult of personality, and revealing many abuses of power Stalin had committed while in power. The Australian party leadership—entirely committed to Stalinism—was confused about what to do. It tried to suppress discussions of the speech, which was widely reported in the press. According to Ralph Gibson, several high-ranking members including Ted Hill had received a copy of Krushchev's secret speech directly from the Communist Party of the Soviet Union However, the party denied the criticisms of Stalin within the party newspaper, Tribune.

Disillusioned members began to leave the party. More left after the Soviet invasion of Hungary in 1956. In 1961, the leader of the "pro-China" faction of the party during the Sino-Soviet split, Ted Hill, was expelled from the party. Hill proceeded to lead a split of pro-China members of the party, which culminated in the formation of the smaller Communist Party of Australia (Marxist-Leninist).

By the 1960s, the party's membership had fallen to around 5,000 members, but it continued to hold positions in a number of trade unions, and it was also influential in the various protest movements of the period, especially the movement against the Vietnam War. This period also saw the establishment of the National Training Centre in Minto, NSW, ostensibly for the purpose of educating in the ideology of Marxism-Leninism. The party became more openly critical about the Soviet Union and the Communist Party of the Soviet Union. In 1966, the party started their own magazine called Australian Left Review. In 1967, the party ceased receiving payments from the Communist Party of the Soviet Union following a seminar by Laurie Aarons in the Soviet Union which argued that "ideas require free contest, not confined in a framework of established dogmas that can become a rigid or even ossified edifice". But the Soviet invasion of Czechoslovakia in 1968 triggered another crisis. Sharkey's successor as party leader, Laurie Aarons, denounced the invasion, and a group of pro-Soviet hardliners left in 1971 to form a new party, the Socialist Party of Australia.

Through the 1970s and 1980s the party continued to decline, despite adopting Eurocommunism and democratising its internal structures so that it became a looser radical party rather than a classic Marxist-Leninist one. The CPA conducted campaigns against nuclear weapons and the extraction of uranium, and supported the demands of indigenous peoples in Australia and abroad, especially in Papua New Guinea. It thus militated for the abolition of legislation judged repressive regarding indigenous people, for equal pay and for land rights. Its members helped Aboriginal workers in Pilbara lead the longest industrial strike ever in Australia. Internationally, the Communist Party of Australia was close to the Revolutionary Front for the Independence of East Timor (Fretilin) who resisted the Indonesian occupation in the 1970s and 1980s. By 1990, membership had declined to below the one thousand mark.

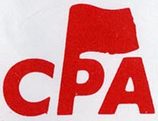
Logo of the CPA, on election sticker, 1980.

=== Dissolution ===
At the party's 31st Congress in Sydney (2–3 March 1991), the Communist Party was dissolved and the New Left Party formed. The New Left Party was intended to be a broader party which would attract a wider range of members, which did not happen, and the New Left Party disbanded in 1992. The assets of the Communist Party were thereafter directed into the SEARCH Foundation (acronym for "Social Education, Action and Research Concerning Humanity"), a not-for-profit company set up in 1990 "to preserve and draw on the resources of the Communist Party of Australia and its archives." The archives of the party are now held at the State Library of NSW and can be accessed with the written permission of the SEARCH Foundation. The State Library of New South Wales holds an extensive collection of material related to the Communist Party of Australia including oral history recordings, business papers, the personal papers of a range of men and women involved in the Party and a collection of images that were published in Tribune, the Party's newspaper. The Victoria University Library holds the Crow Collection, donated by long-time Communist Party member Ruth Crow, which includes materials from her years campaigning for the Communist Party. The University of Melbourne collection is "one of the most significant from the CPA held in Australia", containing 20th-century materials from the Victorian branch.

==== Successor Party ====
In 1996 at the 8th National Congress the Socialist Party of Australia was renamed to Communist Party of Australia, thereby becoming the successor of the original party.

==== Search Foundation ====
The SEARCH Foundation is a left-wing Australian not-for-profit company that was established in 1990 as a successor organisation of the Communist Party of Australia to preserve and draw on its resources and archives. It inherited over 3 million dollars from the CPA.

SEARCH is an active membership-based organisation that runs speaking tours, publications and training programs. Members are welcome from across the Australian Left and include prominent political figures such as Australian Council of Trade Unions Secretary Sally McManus, and former NSW Greens Senator Lee Rhiannon. SEARCH maintains an office at Sydney Trades Hall and holds events across Australia. Its archives are held by the State Library of NSW.

SEARCH is an acronym for "Social Education, Action and Research Concerning Humanity".

== Youth movement ==
The socialist youth group of the Communist Party was formed in 1923 and dissolved in 1984. At various times during this period, the organisation had several different names, including the Young Communist League (YCL); the Young Comrades Club (YCC); the League of Young Democrats (LYD); the Eureka Youth League (EYL); and lastly the Young Socialist League (YSL), which in 1984 became part of the Left Alliance.

From 1946 until its demise in 1968, the Eureka Youth League operated Camp Eureka, a heritage-listed bush camp, located at 90–100 Tarrango Road, Yarra Junction, in the Yarra Ranges, in the north eastern suburbs of Melbourne, in Victoria, Australia. The 7.5-hectare (19-acre) camp is now maintained by the Camp Eureka Working Collective and supported by Friends of Camp Eureka, as an historic and usable camp for up to 32 people, on the traditional lands of the Wurundjeri people. Since the demise of the EYL, the camp has been used by unionists, activists, environmentalists, student organisations, and like-minded groups.

== Elected representatives ==
=== New South Wales ===
==== Broken Hill ====
- Bill Flynn, Alderman of the City of Broken Hill (1953–1974).
- Bill Whiley, Alderman of the City of Broken Hill (1962–1974).

==== Bulli ====
- Andrew Speed, Councillor of Bulli Shire for B Riding (1944–1947).

==== Cessnock ====
- Charles Evans, Alderman of the Municipality of Cessnock (1944–1947).
- Herbert Wilkinson, Alderman of the Municipality of Cessnock (1944–1947).
- Thomas Gilmour, Alderman of the Municipality of Cessnock (1944–1947, 1953–1962).

==== Coonabarabran ====
- Walter Frater, Councillor of Coonabarabran Shire (1953–1956).

==== Kearsley ====
- Jock Graham, Councillor of the Kearsley Shire (1944–1947).
- Allan Opie, Deputy Shire President and Councillor of Kearsley Shire (1944–1947).
- James Palmer, Councillor of Kearsley Shire (1944–1947).
- Mary Ellen "Nellie" Simm, Councillor of Kearsley Shire (1944–1947).
- William Varty, Shire President and Councillor of Kearsley Shire (1944–1947).

==== Lake Macquarie ====
- William Quinn, Councillor of Lake Macquarie Shire for B Riding (1944–1947, 1953–1959).
- R. Chapman, Councillor of Lake Macquarie Shire for B Riding (1944–1947), Deputy Shire President (1945–1946) and Shire President (1946–1947).
- J. Thomson, Councillor of Lake Macquarie Shire for B Riding (1944–1947).

==== Lithgow ====
- Jock King, Alderman of the Lithgow City Council (1952–1956)

==== North Illawarra ====
- Jack Martin, Alderman of the Municipality of North Illawarra (1944–1947).

==== Penrith ====
- Mel McCalman, Alderman of the Municipality of Penrith for St. Mary's Ward (1953–1962).

==== Randwick ====
- Richard Ernest Wilson, Alderman of the Municipality of Randwick (1944–1948) and Deputy Mayor (1947–1948).

==== Redfern ====
- Patrick Levelle, Alderman of the Municipality of Redfern for Redfern Ward (1947–1948).

==== Sydney ====
- Ronald Maxwell, Alderman of the City of Sydney for City Ward (1953–1956).
- Thomas Wright, Alderman of the City of Sydney for City Ward (1953–1959).
- Jack Mundey, Alderman of the City of Sydney (1984–1987).

=== Queensland ===
- Jim Henderson, Councillor of the Shire of Wangaratta for Collinsville (1939–1944).
- Fred Paterson, Alderman of the Townsville City Council (1939–1944) and Member of the Legislative Assembly for Bowen (1944–1950) (the only member elected at state or federal level).

=== Western Australia ===
- Joan Williams, Councillor of the City of Perth (1973–1977)

== Election results ==
=== Federal ===
House of Representatives
Year	Votes	Percentage	Swing	Candidates	Seat(s)
1931	10,402	0.33	▲0.33%	11 / 75	0/75
1934	47,584	1.34	▲1.01%	22 / 74	0/74
1937	17,153	0.48	▼0.86%	2 / 74	0/74
1940	Banned			0 / 74	0/74
1943	81,816	2.00	▲2.00%	18 / 74	0/74
1946	64,811	1.49	▼0.51%	14 / 74	0/74
1949	40,528	0.88	▼0.61%	35 / 121	0/121
1951	44,782	0.98	▲0.10%	27 / 121	0/121
1954	56,675	1.25	▲0.27%	42 / 121	0/121
1955	51,001	1.16	▼0.09%	28 / 122	0/122
1958	26,337	0.53	▼0.63%	21 / 122	0/122
1961	25,429	0.48	▼0.05%	21 / 122	0/122
1963	32,053	0.59	▲0.11%	21 / 122	0/122
1966	23,056	0.40	▼0.19%	16 / 124	0/124
1969	4,920	0.08	▼0.32%	7 / 125	0/125
1972	8,105	0.12	▲0.04%	8 / 125	0/125
1974	539	0.01	▼0.11%	1 / 127	0/127
1975	9,393	0.12	▲0.11%	5 / 127	0/127
1977	14,098	0.18	▲0.06%	7 / 124	0/124
1980	11,318	0.14	▼0.04%	7 / 125	0/125
1983	6,398	0.07	▼0.07%	5 / 125	0/125
1984	1,213	0.01	▼0.06%	1 / 148	0/148
1987	535	0.01	0.0%	1 / 148	0/148
1990	—N/a	—N/a	—N/a	0 / 148	0/148

Senate
Year	Votes	Percentage	Swing	Candidates	Seat(s)
1931	29,443	0.94	▲0.94%	3 / 18	0/36
1934	73,506	2.24	▲1.30%	5 / 18	0/36
1937	—N/a	—N/a	▼2.24%	0 / 19	0/36
1940	Banned			0 / 19	0/36
1943	—N/a	—N/a	—N/a	0 / 19	0/36
1946	—N/a	—N/a	—N/a	0 / 19	0/36
1949	87,958	2.10	▲2.10%	20 / 42	0/60
1951	93,561	2.11	▲0.01%	24 / 60	0/60
1953	140,073	3.05	▲0.94%	16 / 32	0/60
1955	161,869	3.64	▲0.59%	15 / 30	0/60
1958	134,263	2.91	▼0.73%	17 / 32	0/60
1961	78,188	1.62	▼0.73%	18 / 31	0/60
1964	37,915	0.73	▼0.89%	16 / 30	0/60
1967	20,648	0.37	▼0.36%	6 / 30	0/60
1970	—N/a	—N/a	▼0.37%	0 / 32	0/60
1974	20,583	0.31	▲0.31%	9 / 60	0/60
1975	—N/a	—N/a	▼0.31%	0 / 64	0/64
1977	—N/a	—N/a	—N/a	0 / 34	0/64
1980	—N/a	—N/a	—N/a	0 / 34	0/64
1983	—N/a	—N/a	—N/a	0 / 64	0/64
1984	—N/a	—N/a	—N/a	0 / 46	0/76
1987	2,456	0.03	▲0.03%	1 / 76	0/76
1990	—N/a	—N/a	▼0.03%	0 / 40	0/76

Average number of votes p/candidate (both houses)

View source data.

=== New South Wales ===
Legislative Assembly
Election year	No. of overall votes	% of overall vote	seats won	+/–	Notes
1930	10,445	0.79 (5th)	0 / 90	Steady	Extra-parliamentary
1932	12,351	0.92 (5th)	0 / 90	Steady	Extra-parliamentary
1935	19,105	1.52 (5th)	0 / 90	Steady	Extra-parliamentary
1938	10,386	0.88 (5th)	0 / 90	Steady	Extra-parliamentary
1944	21,982	1.74 (9th)	0 / 90	Steady	Extra-parliamentary
1947	27,237	1.71 (6th)	0 / 90	Steady	Extra-parliamentary
1950	13,589	0.84 (7th)	0 / 94	Steady	Extra-parliamentary
1953	21,421	1.38 (5th)	0 / 94	Steady	Extra-parliamentary
1930	29,534	1.74 (5th)	0 / 94	Steady	Extra-parliamentary
1959	24,784	1.45 (5th)	0 / 90	Steady	Extra-parliamentary
1962	12,150	0.63 (7th)	0 / 94	Steady	Extra-parliamentary
1965	13,082	0.64 (7th)	0 / 94	Steady	Extra-parliamentary
1968	5,828	0.27 (7th)	0 / 94	Steady	Extra-parliamentary
1971	2,098	0.79 (7th)	0 / 96	Steady	Extra-parliamentary
1973	838	0.03 (6th)	0 / 99	Steady	Extra-parliamentary
1976	2,220	0.08 (7th)	0 / 99	Steady	Extra-parliamentary
1978	8,472	0.30 (5th)	0 / 99	Steady	Extra-parliamentary
1981	6,250	0.22 (5th)	0 / 99	Steady	Extra-parliamentary

=== Queensland ===
Legislative Assembly
Election year	No. of overall votes	% of overall vote	seats won	+/–	Notes
1929	2,890	0.67 (3rd)	0 / 72	Steady	Extra-parliamentary
1932	1,057	0.23 (5th)	0 / 62	Steady	Extra-parliamentary
1935	6,101	1.32 (4th)	0 / 62	Steady	Extra-parliamentary
1938	8,510	1.60 (6th)	0 / 62	Steady	Extra-parliamentary
1941	5,383	1.00 (8th)	0 / 62	Steady	Extra-parliamentary
1944	12,467	2.43 (4th)	1 / 62	▲1	Crossbench
1947	7,870	1.24 (5th)	1 / 62	Steady	Crossbench
1950	2,351	0.37 (6th)	0 / 75	▼1	Extra-parliamentary
1953	3,948	0.65 (6th)	0 / 75	Steady	Extra-parliamentary
1956	1,332	0.20 (5th)	0 / 75	Steady	Extra-parliamentary
1969	476	0.06 (6th)	0 / 78	Steady	Extra-parliamentary

=== South Australia ===
Legislative Assembly
Election year	No. of overall votes	% of overall vote	seats won	+/–	Notes
1930	696	0.33 (5th)	0 / 46	Steady	Extra-parliamentary
1933	696	0.33 (6th)	0 / 46	Steady	Extra-parliamentary
1944	5,136	2.07 (3rd)	0 / 39	Steady	Extra-parliamentary
1947	8,178	2.97 (3rd)	0 / 39	Steady	Extra-parliamentary
1950	3,749	1.34 (3rd)	0 / 39	Steady	Extra-parliamentary
1953	4,827	1.48 (3rd)	0 / 39	Steady	Extra-parliamentary
1956	3,185	1.16 (4th)	0 / 39	Steady	Extra-parliamentary
1959	5,505	1.42 (4th)	0 / 39	Steady	Extra-parliamentary
1962	2,528	0.62 (4th)	0 / 39	Steady	Extra-parliamentary
1965	2,214	0.44 (6th)	0 / 39	Steady	Extra-parliamentary
1968	1,606	0.29 (6th)	0 / 39	Steady	Extra-parliamentary
1970	743	0.13 (7th)	0 / 47	Steady	Extra-parliamentary

Legislative Council
Election year	No. of overall votes	% of overall vote	seats won	+/–	Notes
1982	11,837	1.60 (5th)	0 / 22	Steady	Extra-parliamentary

=== Tasmania ===
House of Assembly
Election year	No. of overall votes	% of overall vote	seats won	+/–	Notes
1950	86	0.06 (4th)	0 / 30	Steady	Extra-parliamentary
1956	91	0.06 (5th)	0 / 30	Steady	Extra-parliamentary
1959	144	0.09 (5th)	0 / 35	Steady	Extra-parliamentary
1964	92	0.05 (5th)	0 / 35	Steady	Extra-parliamentary

=== Victoria ===
Legislative Assembly
Election year	No. of overall votes	% of overall vote	seats won	+/–	Notes
1929	1,962	0.31 (5th)	0 / 65	Steady	Extra-parliamentary
1932	953	0.14 (5th)	0 / 65	Steady	Extra-parliamentary
1935	9,301	1.11 (4th)	0 / 65	Steady	Extra-parliamentary
1937	5,700	0.72 (4th)	0 / 65	Steady	Extra-parliamentary
1940	2,935	0.38 (5th)	0 / 65	Steady	Extra-parliamentary
1943	38,802	4.51 (5th)	0 / 65	Steady	Extra-parliamentary
1945	25,083	0.31 (7th)	0 / 65	Steady	Extra-parliamentary
1947	1,575	0.13 (4th)	0 / 65	Steady	Extra-parliamentary
1950	6,308	0.52 (4th)	0 / 65	Steady	Extra-parliamentary
1955	4,589	0.35 (7th)	0 / 66	Steady	Extra-parliamentary
1967	1,443	0.09 (5th)	0 / 73	Steady	Extra-parliamentary
1973	398	0.02 (8th)	0 / 73	Steady	Extra-parliamentary
1979	2,305	0.11 (8th)	0 / 81	Steady	Extra-parliamentary

=== Western Australia ===
Legislative Assembly
Election year	No. of overall votes	% of overall vote	seats won	+/–	Notes
1933	442	0.25 (5th)	0 / 50	Steady	Extra-parliamentary
1936	118	0.09 (6th)	0 / 50	Steady	Extra-parliamentary
1939	308	0.15 (5th)	0 / 50	Steady	Extra-parliamentary
1943	713	0.40 (6th)	0 / 50	Steady	Extra-parliamentary
1947	1,641	1.00 (5th)	0 / 50	Steady	Extra-parliamentary
1950	815	0.36 (5th)	0 / 50	Steady	Extra-parliamentary
1953	1,350	0.72 (5th)	0 / 50	Steady	Extra-parliamentary
1956	1,167	0.50 (5th)	0 / 50	Steady	Extra-parliamentary
1959	2,216	0.84 (6th)	0 / 50	Steady	Extra-parliamentary
1962	1,201	0.41 (6th)	0 / 50	Steady	Extra-parliamentary
1965	284	0.09 (5th)	0 / 50	Steady	Extra-parliamentary
1968	1,694	0.53 (6th)	0 / 51	Steady	Extra-parliamentary
1971	2,265	0.48 (6th)	0 / 51	Steady	Extra-parliamentary

== See also ==
- Socialism in Australia
- Communist party
