= List of mayors of Leichhardt =

Mayor of the Municipality of Leichhardt
- Style: His/Her Worship
- Appointer: Municipality of Leichhardt
- Term length: One Year
- Formation: 16 February 1872
- First holder: Ald. Frank Beames
- Final holder: Cr. Darcy Byrne
- Abolished: 12 May 2016
- Deputy: Cr. Vera-Ann Hannaford (Liberal)
- Website: www.leichhardt.nsw.gov.au

This is a list of the mayors of the Municipality of Leichhardt, a former local government area of New South Wales, Australia. The official title of Mayors while holding office was: His/Her Worship The Mayor of Leichhardt. First incorporated on 29 December 1871 as the Municipal District of Leichhardt, the municipality commenced operations on 14 December 1871 and the election of the first Council was held on 6 February 1872. The first mayor was Alderman Frank Beames, elected at the first meeting of the council on 16 February 1872. From 1 January 1949, with the passing of the Local Government (Areas) Act 1948, Leichhardt was reconstituted incorporating the former municipalities of Annandale and Balmain. The last Mayor of Leichhardt was Councillor Darcy Byrne (ALP), first elected on 25 September 2012, who served until the council's amalgamation into the new Inner West Council, which was established on 12 May 2016.

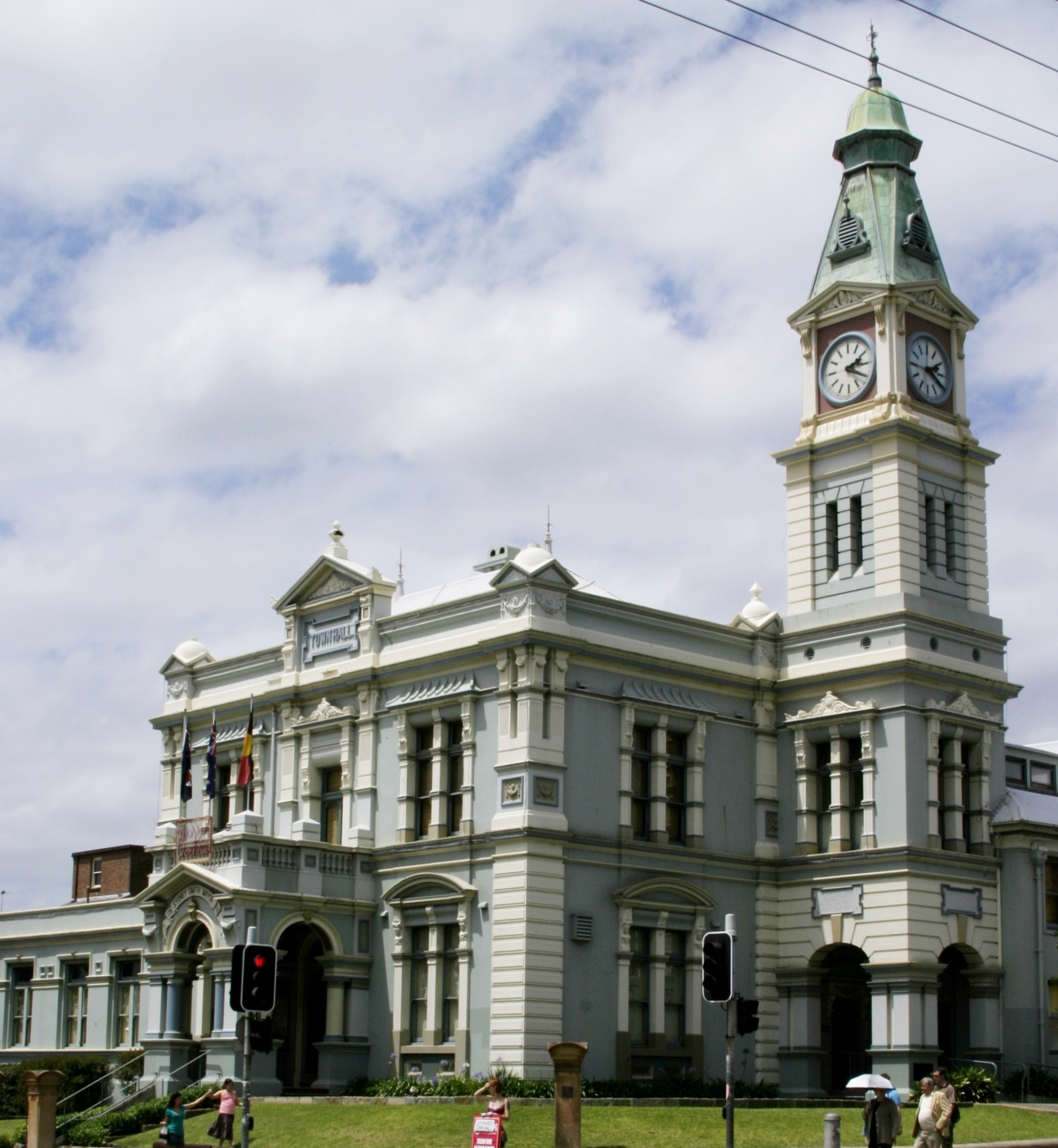
Leichhardt Town Hall, built in 1888, was the seat of Leichhardt Council from 1888 to 2016.

== Mayors ==
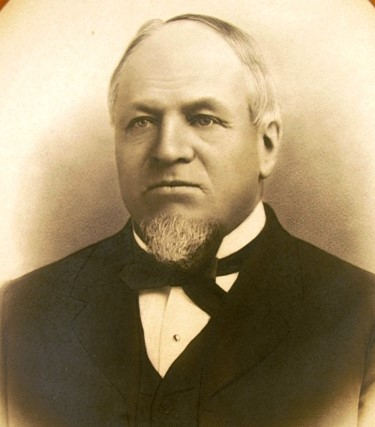
John Young, Mayor 1879–1880 & 1885–1886

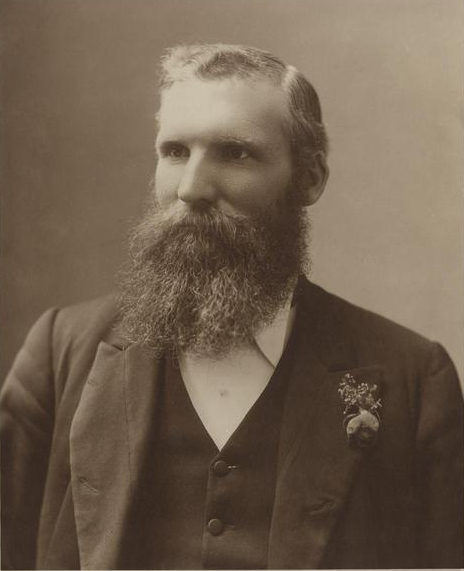
Sydney Smith, Mayor 1888–1889, Member of the Australian Parliament for Macquarie 1901–1906.

=== Municipality of Leichhardt, 1872–1948 ===
#	Years	Mayors	Notes
1	16 February 1872 – 12 February 1875	Frank Beames	
2	12 February 1875 – 14 February 1877	John Wetherill	
3	14 February 1877 – 13 February 1878	Frederick Parsons	
4	13 February 1878 – 11 February 1879	John Thomas Fraser	
5	11 February 1879 – February 1880	John Young	
–	February 1880 – 9 February 1881	John Thomas Fraser	
6	9 February 1881 – February 1882	James Williams	
7	February 1882 – 14 February 1883	William Pritchard	
8	14 February 1883 – 12 June 1883	Thomas Madge	
–	12 June 1883 – 11 February 1885	William Pritchard	
–	11 February 1885 – 10 February 1886	John Young	
9	10 February 1886 – 9 February 1887	Samuel George Davison	
10	9 February 1887 – 15 February 1888	Benjamin Robert Moore	
11	15 February 1888 – 13 February 1889	Sydney Smith	
–	13 February 1889 – 11 February 1890	Benjamin Robert Moore	
12	11 February 1890 – 12 February 1891	Nathaniel Clamp Neal	
–	12 February 1891 – 12 February 1892	Benjamin Robert Moore	
13	12 February 1892 – 11 February 1893	William Bullock Wragge	
14	11 February 1893 – 16 February 1894	Robert Barber Cropley	
–	16 February 1894 – 14 February 1895	Benjamin Robert Moore	
–	14 February 1895 – February 1898	Robert Barber Cropley	
15	February 1898 – 15 February 1899	Alfred Ernest Hearn	
–	15 February 1899 – 15 February 1900	William Bullock Wragge	
16	15 February 1900 – 11 February 1903	James Powell Treadgold	
–	11 February 1903 – 11 February 1904	Nathaniel Clamp Neal	
17	11 February 1904 – February 1905	James Lonsdale	
18	February 1905 – 13 February 1906	William Richard Ainsworth	
–	13 February 1906 – 15 February 1907	Nathaniel Clamp Neal	
19	15 February 1907 – 15 May 1908	William James Pearson	
–	27 May 1908 – 6 February 1909	James Lonsdale	
–	6 February 1909 – 6 February 1911	James Powell Treadgold	
20	6 February 1911 – 1 March 1912	Thomas Hastings	
21	1 March 1912 – 6 February 1913	Robert James Connolly	
–	6 February 1913 – February 1914	James Powell Treadgold	
–	February 1914 – February 1917	Thomas Hastings	
22	February 1917 – February 1920	Alfred Banfield Blackmore	
23	February 1920 – 12 December 1923	William Lambert	
24	12 December 1923 – 1924	Harry George Breen	
–	1924 – 16 December 1925	William Lambert	
25	16 December 1925 – 16 December 1926	William Denison Atkins	
26	16 December 1926 – December 1930	Andrew Noble Campbell	
–	December 1930 – December 1931	William Denison Atkins	
–	December 1931 – December 1932	Andrew Noble Campbell	
27	December 1932 – December 1934	William Stuart	
–	December 1934 – December 1936	Andrew Noble Campbell	
28	December 1936 – December 1937	William Bowmaker	
–	December 1937 – 5 December 1938	William Stuart	
29	5 December 1938 – December 1939	William Dyer (Industrial Labor)	
–	December 1939 – December 1941	William Stuart	
30	December 1941 – December 1943	Alexander O'Hare	
31	December 1943 – December 1944	Joseph Winchester	
32	December 1944 – December 1946	Thomas Reeves	
–	December 1946 – December 1947	William Stuart	
33	11 December 1947 – 31 December 1948	Daniel Beck	

=== Municipality of Leichhardt, 1949–2016 ===
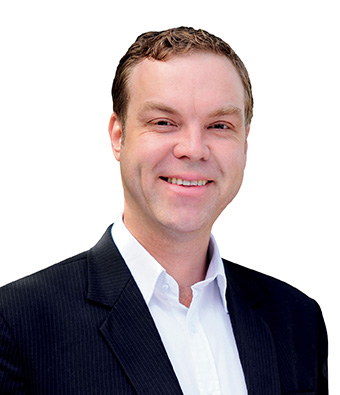
Jamie Parker, Mayor 2008–2011, Member of the NSW Parliament for Balmain 2011–2023.

#	Years	Mayors	Notes
34	1 January 1949 – December 1950	Leo Newton	
35	December 1950 – 23 December 1952	Edward Charles Erwin (ALP)	
36	23 December 1952 – 15 April 1953	Charles Laggan	
–	15 April 1953 – December 1956	Henry William Dane (Administrator)	
37	December 1956 – December 1963	John Deehan	
38	December 1963 – December 1968	Ann Cashman	
39	December 1968 – September 1971	Les Rodwell (ALP)	
40	September 1971 – September 1973	Nick Origlass (Balmain Labor)	
41	September 1973 – September 1974	William Dougherty	
–	September 1974 – September 1979	Les Rodwell (ALP)	
26	September 1979 – September 1984	Evan Jones (ALP)	
27	September 1984 – September 1987	Bill Brady	
–	September 1987 – September 1988	Nick Origlass	
28	September 1988 – September 1989	Doug Spedding	
29	September 1989 – September 1990	Isadore Wyner	
–	September 1990 – September 1991	Bill Brady	
30	September 1991 – September 1995	Larry Hand (Community Independents)	
31	September 1995 – September 1996	Maire Sheehan (Community Independents)	
32	September 1996 – September 1999	Kris Cruden (ALP)	
–	September 1999 – September 2004	Maire Sheehan (Community Independents)	
33	September 2004 – September 2005	Alice Murphy (ALP)	
35	September 2005 – September 2006	Nick Dyer (Liberal)	
–	September 2006 – September 2007	Alice Murphy (ALP)	
36	September 2007 – 13 September 2008	Carolyn Allen (Community Independents)	
37	13 September 2008 – 19 May 2011	Jamie Parker (Greens)	
38	19 May 2011 – 25 September 2012	Rochelle Porteous (Greens)	
39	25 September 2012 – 24 September 2014	Darcy Byrne (ALP)	
–	24 September 2014 – 23 September 2015	Rochelle Porteous (Greens)	
–	23 September 2015 – 12 May 2016	Darcy Byrne (ALP)	
