= Darcy Byrne =

Australian politician

Cr Darcy Byrne
- Darcy Byrne at Marrickville Sunday Sessions, 2026

Mayor of Inner West Council
- Incumbent
- Assumed office 30 December 2021
- Deputy: List: Julie Passas (2017–2018) (Note: Liberal); Victor Macri (2018–2019) (Note: Independent); Vittoria Raciti (2019–2020); Victor Macri (2020–2021); Pauline Lockie (2021); Jessica D'Arienzo (2021–2022) (Note: Labor); Philippa Scott (2022–2023); Chloe Smith (2023–2024); Mat Howard (2024–2025); Chloe Smith (2025–2026); Philippa Scott (2026–present)
- Preceded by: Rochelle Porteous (Note: Greens)
- In office 21 September 2017 – 7 September 2021
- Preceded by: New office
- Succeeded by: Rochelle Porteous

Councillor of Inner West Council for Balmain–Baludarri Ward (Note: In 2017, it was called Balmain ward.)
- Incumbent
- Assumed office 9 September 2017 Serving with Ismet Tastan, Kerrie Fergusson, Kobi Shetty, Rochelle Porteous, John Stamolis
- Preceded by: New office

Mayor of the Municipality of Leichhardt
- In office 4 October 2012 – 24 September 2014
- Deputy: Linda Kelly (from 2012); Vera Ann-Hannaford (2015–2016)
- Preceded by: Rochelle Porteous
- Succeeded by: Rochelle Porteous
- In office 23 September 2015 – 12 May 2016
- Succeeded by: Council abolished

Councillor of the Municipality of Leichhardt for Wangal/Rozelle-Lilyfield ward
- In office 13 September 2008 – 12 May 2016 Serving with Tony Costatino, Michele McKenzie, John Jobling
- Succeeded by: Council abolished

Personal details
- Born: 1980 or 1981 (age 45–46) Balmain, Sydney, New South Wales, Australia
- Party: Labor
- Spouse: Rae
- Children: 2
- Committees: List: Local Traffic Committee; General Manager Performance Assessment Panel; Southern Sydney Regional Organisation of Councils; Sydney Airport Community Forum; Sydney Eastern City Planning Panel
- Website: Clr Darcy Byrne – Baludarri Ward (Balmain) | Inner West Council

Darcy Byrne (born 1980 or 1981) is an Australian politician who has served as the mayor of Inner West Council since December 2021. He has also been a councillor for Inner West Council since 2017. He is also currently serving as president of Local Government NSW.

He was previously mayor of the council from September 2017 to September 2021.

He was also mayor of the Municipality of Leichhardt from 4 October 2012 until 24 September 2014 and then was re-elected until the council's amalgamation in 2016 with Ashfield Council and Marrickville Council to become Inner West Council. He had been a councillor for the Municipality of Leichhardt since 2008.

== Early life ==
Byrne was raised in Balmain and educated at Balmain Primary School and Balmain High School.

When Byrne was young and caring for his dad, he lived in a boarding house in Balmain for five years which he says "was a very educative experience". He has cited a desire to protect this type of housing in the Inner West.

Byrne managed Glebe Youth Services among other youth services for the City of Sydney council.

== Political career ==
In 2012, Byrne was elected Mayor of Leichhardt Council. Labor member Linda Kelly was elected deputy mayor of the council. The Greens proposed an unsuccessful deal in which one of their members would have become mayor with a Labor deputy Mayor in 2012–2013 and a Labor Mayor with a Greens deputy Mayor in 2013–2014. The mayor and deputy mayor were both re-elected in September 2013. Upon their re-election, Byrne pledged to "crusade for the needs of children and families."

Byrne was re-elected mayor of Leichhardt Council in October 2015 following 12 months away from the mayoralty. Liberal Vera Ann-Hannaford was elected deputy mayor.

In 2015, Byrne supported a project proposed by Leichhardt councillors who proposed a welcome centre for refugees at Callan Park. The council had earlier rejected a similar proposal due to a lack of state and federal government funding. When the council rejected the proposal, Byrne said that the Greens have decided to "join with Liberal Party and white supremacist thugs".

Byrne became the first mayor of the recently amalgamated Inner West Council in September 2017. To achieve the majority of votes required to become mayor, Labor struck a deal with the Liberals and an independent on the council. An offer was also made from the Greens in exchange for Labor being in power for the first two years of the council term with the Greens being in a deputy mayoral position for the first two years. Byrne was primarily challenged by anti-WestConnex campaigner Pauline Lockie. The Liberals were elected to a deputy mayoral position.

In March 2021, he referred the staff of Inner West Council to the New South Wales Auditor-General for alleged mismanagement of works on Dawn Fraser Baths. This resulted in the resignation of the council's acting chief executive officer Brian Barrett who called Byrne's referral an "enormous betrayal".

In May 2021, Byrne was found to have a conflict of interest following his call for councillors Pauline Lockie and Colin Hesse to apologise due to criticisms the councillors made on social media about a project that the council approved on Victoria Road. Byrne's lawyers subsequently sent notices of defamation to Lockie and Hesse. A motion was raised in the council calling on Lockie and Hesse to apologise.

During a council meeting in April 2021, Byrne put forward a successful motion to compel fellow councillor Julie Passas to leave the chamber during a meeting after she interjected several times and received three official warnings. Passas refused and said she would stay unless the police arrived. Passas then accused Byrne of wanting her removed as a councillor. Passas accused Byrne of moving his motion to stop a motion of no confidence in this position as mayor. The meeting was moved to another room but Passas followed them. Byrne then called on senior state government ministers to disendorse Passas for the upcoming council elections.

In August 2021, Byrne was accused of using a council vote to quash negative comments about himself. His pay was subsequently suspended by the NSW Civil and Administrative Tribunal.

Byrne was ousted as mayor three months prior to the 2021 local government elections. He was replaced by Rochelle Porteous from the Greens. Byrne criticised the election of Porteous as mayor as being "a backroom deal".

In December 2021, Byrne was re-elected as mayor of the Inner West Council with Jessica D'Arienzo serving as his deputy.

In December 2023, Byrne called the state government's decision to fund an upgrade to Penrith Stadium a case of "blatant pork barreling" due to Penrith's status as a marginal seat at the 2023 state election.

In May 2024, Byrne condemned the decision of Cumberland City Council to ban books based on same-sex parenting, he said that "Banning books is something we would expect to see in [Vladimir] Putin's Russia, not modern, inclusive Sydney."

In February 2025, Byrne signed a statement condemning racial violence along with mayors of 21 other councils across Sydney.

In October 2025, Byrne supported Inner West Council's Fairer Future Plan. This means the area can be rezoned to allow for high-density living up to 22 storeys high. Byrne says that the state government's transport-oriented development policy does not go far enough. Byrne said that young people need this policy most to help affordability in the area.

In November 2025, Byrne was elected president of Local Government NSW — an advocacy group for local councils upon the retirement of former Forbes Shire Council Mayor Phyllis Miller.

On 7 December 2025, Byrne requested that the state government intervene in the Wests Tigers due to disputes on their board, leading to the removal of independent members by majority-owners Holman Barnes Group.

On 13 December, Byrne announced the formation of a group for Wests Tigers fans that would hold the Holman Barnes Group to account to be titled Wests Tigers Unite which he said would "give fans a real say".

Following the shootings at Bondi Beach, as president of Local Government NSW, Byrne issued a statement regarding the attack and condemning the attack as "pure evil", he was supported by the mayors of other councils in New South Wales in making this statement. He issued an earlier statement announcing that flags on council buildings would be lowered on 15 December, Byrne also committed Local Government NSW and local representatives to supporting the Bondi community.

At the conference of the state Labor Party in July, along with Unions NSW secretary Mark Morey, Byrne moved a motion calling on the NSW Government to implement a moratorium on new gambling machine licenses, create a new tax on clubs that raise over $20 million and half the number of machines that can be traded within 10 years, the motion received the endorsement of the state's gaming minister David Harris and was unanimously approved.

=== Political views ===
Byrne supports gambling reform to minimise losses caused by poker machines, arguing that "the people who suffer most from poker machine losses are overwhelmingly the people Labor was created to represent." He has criticised the gambling industry in Australia for "acting like the National Rifle Association in the United States by targeting any person or leader who speaks up to say the poker machine harm is out of control."

== Personal life ==
Byrne is a fan of the NRL team Wests Tigers. Byrne became a father in 2012 and cites this as a motivation to open more childcare centres. He has two children and is a Christian. He is married to Rae.

Byrne worked for Grayndler MP Anthony Albanese from 2010 to 2019. Byrne has been suggested as the Labor successor in Albanese's seat of Grayndler. Byrne ran for preselection in the seat of Balmain in 2014 but lost out to former Labor MP for Balmain Verity Firth. Within the Labor Party, Byrne is a member of the Labor Left faction.

Byrne's father, Reg, was a teacher but medically retired due to alcoholism so Byrne and his mother acted as a carer.

== Notes ==
Political offices
Preceded by Rochelle Porteous	Mayor of Inner West Council; 2021–present	Incumbent

Political offices
New title	Mayor of Inner West Council; 2017–2021	Succeeded by Rochelle Porteous

Political offices
New title	Councillor of Inner West Council for Balmain–Baludarri Ward; 2017–present	Incumbent

Political offices
Preceded by Rochelle Porteous	Mayor of the Municipality of Leichhardt; 2015–2016	Succeeded by Rochelle Porteous

Political offices
Preceded by Rochelle Porteous	Mayor of the Municipality of Leichhardt; 2012–2014

Political offices
Councillor of the Municipality of Leichhardt for Wangal/Rozelle-Lilyfield ward
2008–2016
