= Tim Stephens =

Tim Stephens may refer to:

- Tim Stephens (karateka), English karateka
- Tim Stephens (legal academic) (born 1975), Australian lawyer, professor of International Law at the University of Sydney
