= Nick Origlass =

Politician in New South Wales, Australia

- Origlass in 1945
- Born: 13 January 1908; Woodstock, Queensland, Australia
- Died: 17 May 1996 (aged 88); Balmain, Sydney
- Occupation: politician
- Political party: Balmain-Leichhardt Labor Party

Nick Origlass (13 January 1908 – 17 May 1996) was an Australian Trotskyist who served as mayor of Leichhardt in Sydney.

== Early life ==
In 1932, Origlass joined the Communist Party of Australia (CPA), which was then aligned with Stalin's USSR. Expelled soon after, he became involved in the Trotskyist movement. He joined the Workers Party in 1934 and by 1937 was its leading figure. The Workers Party merged into the Communist League of Australia in 1938.

== Career ==
In 1940, Origlass started working at Mort's Dock in Sydney's Balmain shipyards. He was elected as a shop steward with the Federated Ironworkers Association of Australia. Together with fellow Trotskyists Laurie Short and Jim McClelland, he battled with the CPA-dominated leadership of the union. After Hitler's invasion of the USSR in 1941, the CPA supported the Australian war effort, but the Trotskyists did not. In 1941, the Communist League was banned by the Australian government because of its anti-war stance. In 1942, Origlass started publishing a newspaper called The Socialist to propagandise for Trotskyism. The struggle in the union culminated in 1945 when the leadership removed Origlass from his position as a shop steward. The Balmain waterfront responded by going on strike against the union, and Origlass was re-instated. Short and McClelland left the Trotskyist movement soon afterwards, becoming prominent figures in the Australian Labor Party (ALP). Short became national secretary of the union in 1951, defeating the CPA's Ernie Thornton after a bitter legal battle.

Meanwhile, Origlass formed the Labor Socialist Group to pursue an entrist strategy inside the ALP. In 1952, he ceased publication of The Socialist so he would be allowed to join the party. In 1958 he was elected to Leichhardt Council for the ALP. A decade later he was expelled from the ALP but re-elected to the council on an "Independent Labor" ticket. He served as mayor of Leichhardt Council in 1971–1972. In the 1989 in partnership with long time ally Issy Wyner, Origlass instituted the radical democratic system of Open Council where the public had agency to address Councilors directly during council meetings. When he retired from council in 1995, he had had only a four-year break in 1980–1984 in over 30 years as an alderman.

== Death ==
Origlass suffered from cancer for a year before he died in Balmain on 17 May 1996. He was 88. He left his wife Joan and son, Peter.
