= Marrickville Council =

Former local government area in New South Wales, Australia

- Local government area
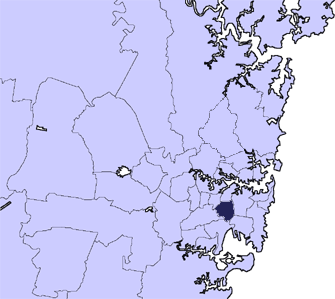
- Location in Metropolitan Sydney

- Coordinates: 33°54′S 151°09′E
- Country: Australia
- State: New South Wales
- Region: Inner West
- Established: 1 November 1861
- Abolished: 12 May 2016
- Council seat: Marrickville (1861–1948); Petersham (1948–2016)

Area
  - Total: 17 km^{2} (6.6 sq mi)

Population
  - Total: 76,500 (2011 census)
  - Density: 4,500/km^{2} (12,000/sq mi)
LGAs around Marrickville Council
Ashfield	Leichhardt	Sydney
Canterbury	Marrickville Council	Sydney
Canterbury	Rockdale	Botany

Marrickville Council was a local government area located in the Inner West region of Sydney, Australia. It was originally created on 1 November 1861 as the "Municipality of Marrickville". On 12 May 2016, Marrickville Council was merged with Ashfield and Leichhardt councils into the newly formed Inner West Council.

The area was bounded by Leichhardt to the north, the City of Sydney to the east and north-east, the City of Botany Bay to the south-east, Rockdale to the south, Canterbury to the west, and Ashfield to the north-west. It covers an area of approximately 17 square kilometres (6.6 sq mi). The area is roughly bounded by Parramatta Road to the north, King Street and the Princes Highway to the east, the Cooks River and Alexandra Canal to the south, and New and Old Canterbury Roads to the west.

While the area's background was traditionally working-class, which made the area a stronghold for the Australian Labor Party, several waves of immigration and a continuing trend of gentrification substantially influenced the demographics and character of the area, increasing the number of independents and Greens on the council. The last mayor of Marrickville Council was Cr. Sam Iskandar of the Labor Party.

In December 2021, a majority of voters in Inner West Council voted in favour of reversing the 2016 merger and separating the three pre-existing councils of Ashfield, Leichhardt and Marrickville.

== Suburbs and localities ==
Marrickvile in Timelapse

The suburbs and localities within the former Marrickville Council area were:

- Camperdown (with parts located within the City of Sydney)
- Dulwich Hill
- Enmore
- Lewisham
- Marrickville
- Mascot (minor part) (most parts located within the City of Botany Bay)
- Newtown (with parts located within the City of Sydney)
- Petersham
- St Peters
- Stanmore
- Sydenham
- Tempe

== History ==
Based on artefacts found near the Cooks River and Alexandra Canal, it is believed that the area has been occupied for at least 7,000 years. The area was originally occupied by the Cadigal clan of the Darug people who spoke the Eora language. Their name for most of the present day local government area was Bullanaming.

European settlement of the area began very soon after the arrival of the First Fleet in 1788. The first land grant was made in 1789, and by 1809 all the land had been granted. In the 1830s, the district consisted of five large estates, including Thomas Chalder's estate named Marrick after his home town in North Yorkshire. At this point, the area was still quite rural in nature.

Following the subdivision of these estates, municipalities were formed in Marrickville (1 November 1861), Camperdown (1862), Newtown (1862), St Peters (1871) and Petersham (1872). The first Marrickville council, consisting of six councillors elected proportionately, was elected on 9 December 1861 at the Stanmore Hotel.

The population of the inner west increased greatly from the beginning of the 20th century, peaking at roughly 113,000 in 1948. It was in this year that the State Government introduced the Local Government (Areas) Act 1948, and Marrickville Municipal Council was enlarged by merging with St Peters and Petersham on 1 January 1949. The Camperdown and Newtown municipalities had already been merged with the City of Sydney, however in 1968 a boundary readjustment added parts of these areas to Marrickville.

The area's background was traditionally working-class, making Marrickville Council a stronghold for the Australian Labor Party, and Labor Party ructions often affected the politics of the council itself. In the 1980s, a toxic culture in inner-city party branches and inter-factional disturbances, which led to the assault of NSW Legislative Council member, Peter Baldwin, at his house in Marrickville, affected Marrickville Council most particularly, with a party committee recommending its dismissal in July 1980.

Although initially opposed as an extreme act, particularly by Minister for Local Government, Lin Gordon, when five Labor aldermen, Barry Jones, Margaret Newman, Jack Passaris, Ken Brennan and Grahame Watson, resigned from the council in December 1982, alleging that they had been "bashed out of office" and detailing "five years of threats and intimidation" (Newman and Brennan had both been assaulted in their own homes days before), Gordon finally took action. On 14 December 1982, Gordon dismissed Marrickville Council and appointed the former Shire Clerk of Gunnedah and Walgett, Alexander Trevallion as Administrator. Council remained under administration, which included debates over an amalgamation with Leichhardt Municipality, until elections were held on 22 September 1984.

=== Israel boycott ===
On 14 December 2010, Greens councillor Cathy Peters moved a motion to support the international Boycott, Divestment and Sanctions against Israel. This motion was supported by Greens, Labor and one independent councillor, including the mayor at the time, Fiona Byrne. The motion was widely condemned by politicians from both sides of politics including Foreign Minister Kevin Rudd, then Premier Kristina Keneally and federal Greens leader, Bob Brown. The move received support from Nobel Peace Prize Laureates Archbishop Desmond Tutu and Mairead Maguire. On 14 April 2011, it was revealed that the boycott would cost Marrickville ratepayers A$3.4 million if implemented. The boycott also meant the council would have to replace goods from companies such as Hewlett-Packard, Holden, Volvo and Motorola amongst others.

New South Wales Liberal Premier Barry O'Farrell threatened to use powers under the Local Government Act 1993 to sack the council if it did not rescind its resolution for the boycott. At a council meeting on 19 April 2011, members of the community were invited to express their opinions, and after a three hour debate the motion was rescinded. Byrne did not seek re-election, and in September 2011, Morris Hanna became the new mayor after Labor supported his candidacy and his name was pulled out of the hat in the tie breaker. He is an independent who fought against the BDS campaign.

=== Amalgamation ===
A 2015 review of local government boundaries recommended that the Marrickville Council merge with the Municipality of Ashfield and the Municipality of Leichhardt to form a new council with an area of 35 square kilometres (14 sq mi) and support a population of approximately 186,000. The merger was implemented on 12 May 2016.

== Demographics ==
At the 2011 Census, there were 76,500 people in the Marrickville local government area, of these 49.5% were male and 50.5% were female. Aboriginal and Torres Strait Islander people made up 1.5% of the population. The median age of people in the Marrickville Council area was 36 years. Children aged 0 – 14 years made up 14.7% of the population and people aged 65 years and over made up 10.4% of the population. Of people in the area aged 15 years and over, 35.1% were married and 10.9% were either divorced or separated.

Population in the Marrickville Council area between the 2001 Census and the 2006 Census decreased by 0.99% and in the subsequent five years to the 2011 Census, population growth was 6.53%. When compared with total population growth of Australia for the same periods, being 5.78% and 8.32% respectively, population growth in the Marrickville local government area was lower than the national average. The median weekly income for residents within the Manly Council area was higher than the national average.

Compared to the national average, at the 2011 Census, Marrickville Council area had a high proportion of households (34.1%) where two or more languages are spoken (national average was 20.4%); and a low proportion (62.3%) where English only was spoken at home (national average was 76.8%).

Selected historical census data for Marrickville local government area
Census year		2001	2006	2011
Population	Estimated residents on Census night	72,529	71,813	76,500
Population	LGA rank in terms of size within New South Wales			
Population	% of New South Wales population			1.11%
Population	% of Australian population	0.39%	▼0.36%	0.36%
Cultural and language diversity				
Ancestry, top responses	English			19.5%
Ancestry, top responses	Australian			17.9%
Ancestry, top responses	Irish			9.2%
Ancestry, top responses	Scottish			6.0%
Ancestry, top responses	Greek			4.9%
Language, top responses (other than English)	Greek	7.2%	▼6.4%	▼5.5%
Language, top responses (other than English)	Vietnamese	5.1%	▼4.1%	▼3.7%
Language, top responses (other than English)	Arabic	3.7%	▼2.9%	▼2.3%
Language, top responses (other than English)	Portuguese	3.1%	▼2.4%	▼2.0%
Language, top responses (other than English)	Cantonese	2.3%	▼2.0%	▼1.7%
Religious affiliation				
Religious affiliation, top responses	No religion	19.5%	▲24.0%	▲32.7%
Religious affiliation, top responses	Catholic	27.1%	▼25.6%	▼23.5%
Religious affiliation, top responses	Anglican	10.1%	▼9.4%	▼8.2%
Religious affiliation, top responses	Eastern Orthodox	9.7%	▼8.6%	▼7.5%
Religious affiliation, top responses	Buddhism	6.6%	▼5.5%	▼5.1%
Median weekly incomes				
Personal income	Median weekly personal income		A$595	A$772
Personal income	% of Australian median income		127.7%	133.8%
Family income	Median weekly family income		A$1,160	A$1,964
Family income	% of Australian median income		113.0%	132.6%
Household income	Median weekly household income		A$1,460	A$1,605
Household income	% of Australian median income		124.7%	130.1%

== Council ==
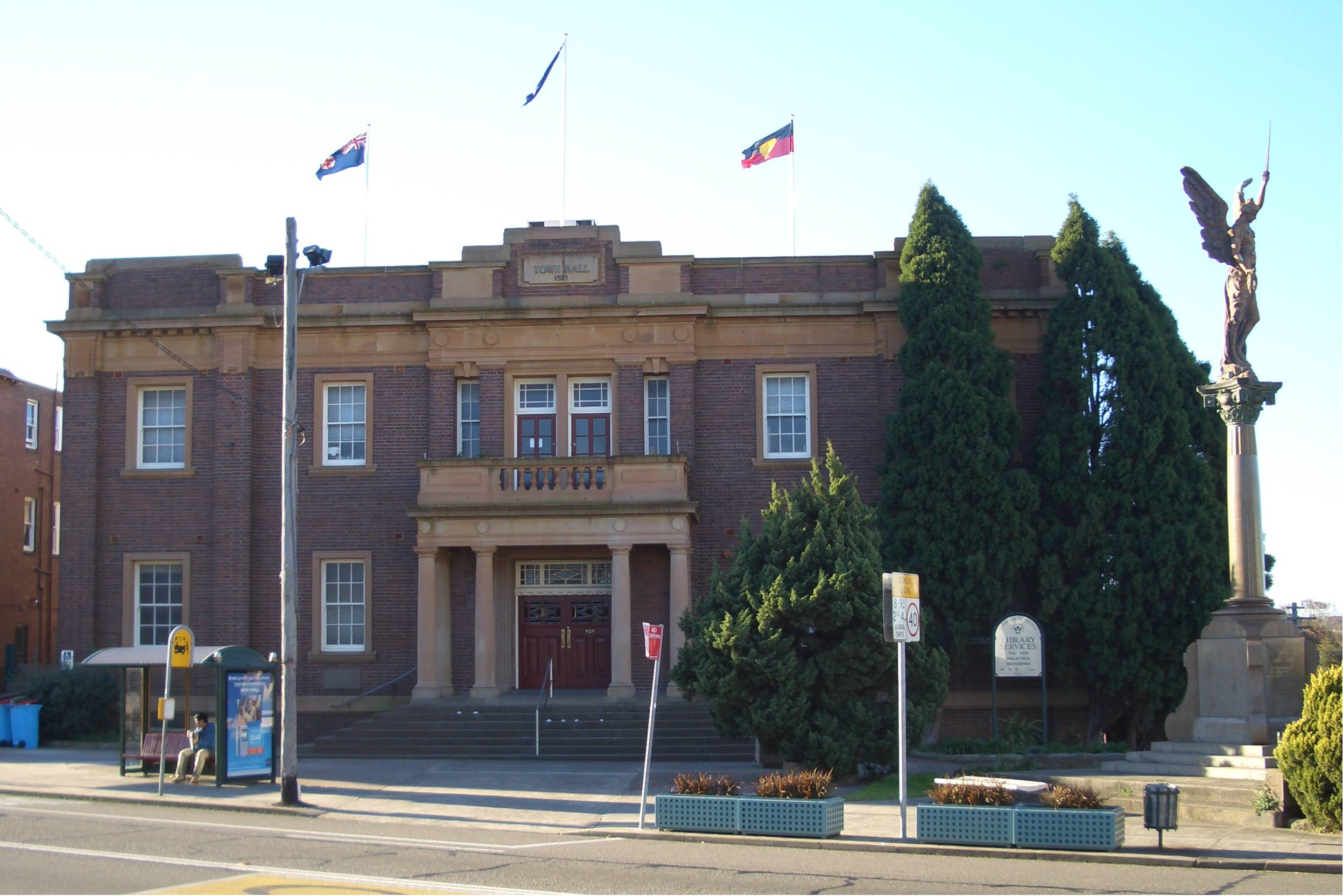
Marrickville Town Hall on Marrickville Road was the council seat from 1922 to 1948.

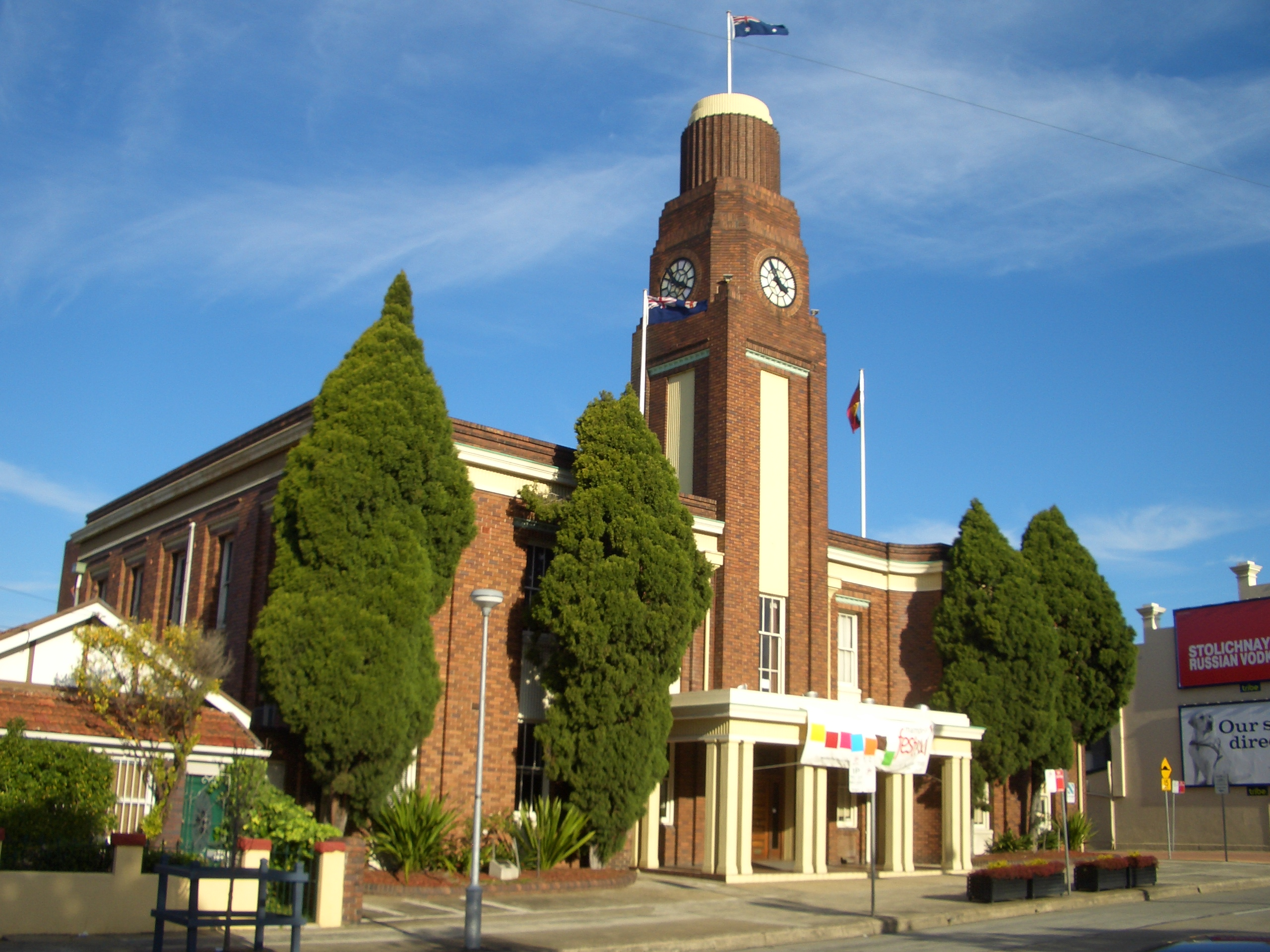
Petersham Town Hall was the seat of Marrickville Council from 1948 to 1974.

=== Final composition and election method ===
Marrickville Municipal Council was composed of twelve councillors elected proportionally as four separate wards, each electing three councillors. All councillors were elected for a fixed four-year term of office, while the mayor and deputy mayor being elected by the councillors at the first meeting of the council. The last election was held on 8 September 2012, and the makeup of the council after that election was as follows:

Ward	Councillor	Party	Notes
Central Ward	Max Phillips	The Greens	
Central Ward	Sam Iskandar	Labor	Mayor 2008–2010, 2015–2016. Elected Marrickville Ward, Inner West Council.
Central Ward	Victor Macri	Independent	Mayor 2012–2013 Elected Marrickville Ward, Inner West Council.
North Ward	Sylvie Ellsmore	The Greens	
North Ward	Jo Haylen	Labor	Mayor 2013–2014. MP for Summer Hill, 2015.
North Ward	Mark Gardiner	Independent	Liberal until September 2014. Mayor 2014–2015
South Ward	Chris Woods	Labor	
South Ward	David Leary	The Greens	
South Ward	Morris Hanna	Independent	Mayor 2011–2012, Deputy Mayor 2014–2015
West Ward	Emanuel Tsardoulias	Labor	Deputy Mayor 2012–2013. Died November 2014.
West Ward	Melissa Brooks	The Greens	
West Ward	Rosana Tyler	Liberal	
West Ward	Daniel Barbar	Labor	Elected at by-election on 15 November 2014

=== Mayors ===
Chairman	Party	Term	Notes
Gerald Halligan	Independent	December 1861 – February 1864	
John Russell Jones	Independent	February 1864 – 22 February 1865	
William Amner	Independent	22 February 1865 – February 1866	
Gerald Halligan	Independent	February 1866 – February 1867	
Samuel Payten	Independent	February 1867 – 13 February 1868	
Mayor	Party	Term	Notes
Charles St Julian	Independent	13 February 1868 – 3 February 1870	
Joseph Graham	Independent	3 February 1870 – 17 February 1871	
Charles St Julian	Independent	17 February 1871 – 13 February 1872	
Charles Teeson	Independent	13 February 1872 – 12 February 1873	
Joseph Graham	Independent	12 February 1873 – 9 February 1875	
Rollo Albert Cape	Independent	9 February 1875 – 17 February 1877	
Robert Pfoeffer	Independent	17 February 1877 – February 1879	
Thomas Henry Alcock	Independent	12 February 1879 – 13 October 1880	
Joseph Graham	Independent	13 October 1880 – 16 February 1882	
Henry John Chisholm	Independent	16 February 1882 – 16 February 1884	
William Shaw	Independent	16 February 1884 – 8 February 1887	
Joseph Graham	Independent	8 February 1887 – 15 February 1888	
Charles Moyes	Independent	15 February 1888 – 14 February 1889	
Joseph Graham	Independent	14 February 1889 – 13 February 1890	
William Henry Smith	Independent	13 February 1890 – 12 February 1891	
Joseph Graham	Independent	12 February 1891 – 11 February 1892	
Alexander Hamilton Scouller	Independent	11 February 1892 – 16 February 1894	
Joshua Jeremiah Farr	Independent	16 February 1894 – 14 February 1895	
George Alfred Morehouse	Independent	14 February 1895 – 10 February 1896	
Richard McCoy	Independent	10 February 1896 – 12 February 1897	
James Gould	Independent	12 February 1897 – 10 February 1898	
William Robson Benson	Independent	10 February 1898 – 16 February 1899	
William Wycliffe Clarke	Independent	16 February 1899 – 20 March 1900	
Henry Archdall Langley	Independent	20 March 1900 – 14 February 1901	
Joshua Percy Josephson	Independent	14 February 1901 – 12 February 1902	
William Thomas Henson	Independent	12 February 1902 – 12 February 1903	
Thomas Hillard England	Independent	12 February 1903 – 16 February 1905	
James Gould	Independent	16 February 1905 – 15 February 1906	
William Thomas Henson	Independent	15 February 1906 – February 1909	
William Henry Osgood	Independent	February 1909 – February 1911	
Joseph Thornley	Independent	February 1911 – February 1914	
Benjamin Richards	Independent	February 1914 – February 1915	
John Ness	Independent	February 1915 – 13 February 1919	
Benjamin Richards	Independent	13 February 1919 – December 1921	
Henry James Morton	Independent	December 1921 – 17 December 1924	
William Henry Wicks	Independent	17 December 1924 – 16 December 1925	
Edward Mackey	Independent	16 December 1925 – December 1926	
Milton Jarvie	Independent	December 1926 – 15 December 1927	
Benjamin Richards	Independent	15 December 1927 – 19 December 1929	
Henry James Morton	Civic Progress Party	19 December 1929 – December 1930	
Robert Richard Allison	Civic Progress Party	December 1930 – December 1931	
Frank Broome Wright	Civic Progress Party	December 1931 – 20 December 1932	
Frederick Rushton	Civic Progress Party	20 December 1932 – December 1933	
Robert Richard Allison	Civic Progress Party	December 1933 – December 1934	
Henry James Morton	Civic Progress Party	December 1934 – 30 December 1935	
Harold Douglas Marr	Civic Progress Party	30 December 1935 – December 1936	
William John Ness	Independent	December 1936 – December 1937	
Henry Thomas Braddock	Citizens Party	December 1937 – December 1938	
Robert Richard Allison	Civic Progress Party	December 1938 – December 1939	
Harold Douglas Marr	Civic Progress Party	December 1939 – December 1940	
Frank Broome Wright	Civic Progress Party	December 1940 – December 1941	
Francis Buckley	Labor	December 1941 – December 1943	
Donald Cochrane	Labor	December 1943 – 12 December 1944	
William Murray	Labor	12 December 1944 – 3 December 1946	
Robert Richard Allison	Civic Progress Party	3 December 1946 – 15 December 1948	
Gilbert Barry		15 December 1948 – 6 December 1949	
Bruce James McAdam	Independent	6 December 1949 – December 1950	
William Maggs		December 1950 – December 1951	
Leslie Arthur Scutts	Independent	December 1951 – 2 December 1952	
Norm Ryan	Labor	2 December 1952 – December 1953	
William Murray	Labor	December 1953 – 7 December 1954	
Albert Edward Murdock	Labor	7 December 1954 – 7 December 1956	
Arthur Poole		7 December 1956 – December 1957	
William Edgar Kendrick		December 1957 – December 1958	
John Friel Laxton		December 1958 – December 1959	
Joseph John Fitzgerald	Labor	December 1959 – 5 December 1962	
C. Stratton		5 December 1962 – December 1964	
Tom Foster	Labor	December 1968 – December 1971	
John Harrison	Labor	– 14 December 1982	
Alexander Martin Trevallion (Administrator)		14 December 1982 – 26 January 1983	
Colin Gallimore Saunders (Administrator)		26 January 1983 – 25 July 1983	
Alexander Martin Trevallion (Administrator)		25 July 1983 – 22 September 1984	
Barry Jones	Labor	September 1984 – September 1991	
Barry Cotter	Labor	September 1991 – September 2004	
Morris Hanna	Independent	September 2004 – September 2005	
Sam Byrne	Greens	September 2005 – September 2006	
Morris Hanna	Independent	September 2006 – 25 September 2007	
Dimitrios Thanos	Independent	25 September 2007 – September 2008	
Sam Iskandar	Labor	September 2008 – September 2010	
Fiona Byrne	Greens	September 2010 – September 2011	
Morris Hanna	Independent	September 2011 – September 2012	
Victor Macri	Independent	September 2012 – September 2013	
Jo Haylen	Labor	September 2013 – September 2014	
Mark Gardiner	Independent	September 2014 – September 2015	
Sam Iskandar	Labor	September 2015 – 12 May 2016	

=== Notable councillors ===
- John Adamson, Alderman 1944–1948, MP for Concord 1950–1953.
- Sylvia Hale, Councillor 1995–2004, Greens MLC 2003–2010.
- Leo McLeay, Alderman 1971–1977, MHR for Grayndler 1979–1993, MHR for Watson 1993–2004, Speaker of the House of Representatives 1989–1993.
- Penny Sharpe, Councillor 2004–2008, MLC 2005–present
- Sir Bertram Stevens, Alderman 1925–1927, Premier 1932–1939.
- Carmel Tebbutt, Councillor 1993–1998, Deputy Mayor 1995–1998, MP for Marrickville 2005–2015, Deputy Premier of NSW 2008–2011.
- Jo Haylen, MP for Summer Hill 2015–present

== Housing ==
The suburbs within the Marrickville area are generally characterised by Victorian-era terraces, semi-detached houses and other varieties of urban federation housing. These houses gained popularity among renovators as the suburbs became gentrified in the late 20th century. Detached housing, wider streets and larger blocks of land are more common in the suburbs further from the city, such as Dulwich Hill and parts of Marrickville.

Several medium density apartment blocks were constructed in the area in the 1960s and 1970s. Since the 1980s, modern infill development has tended to be sympathetic with traditional streetscapes.

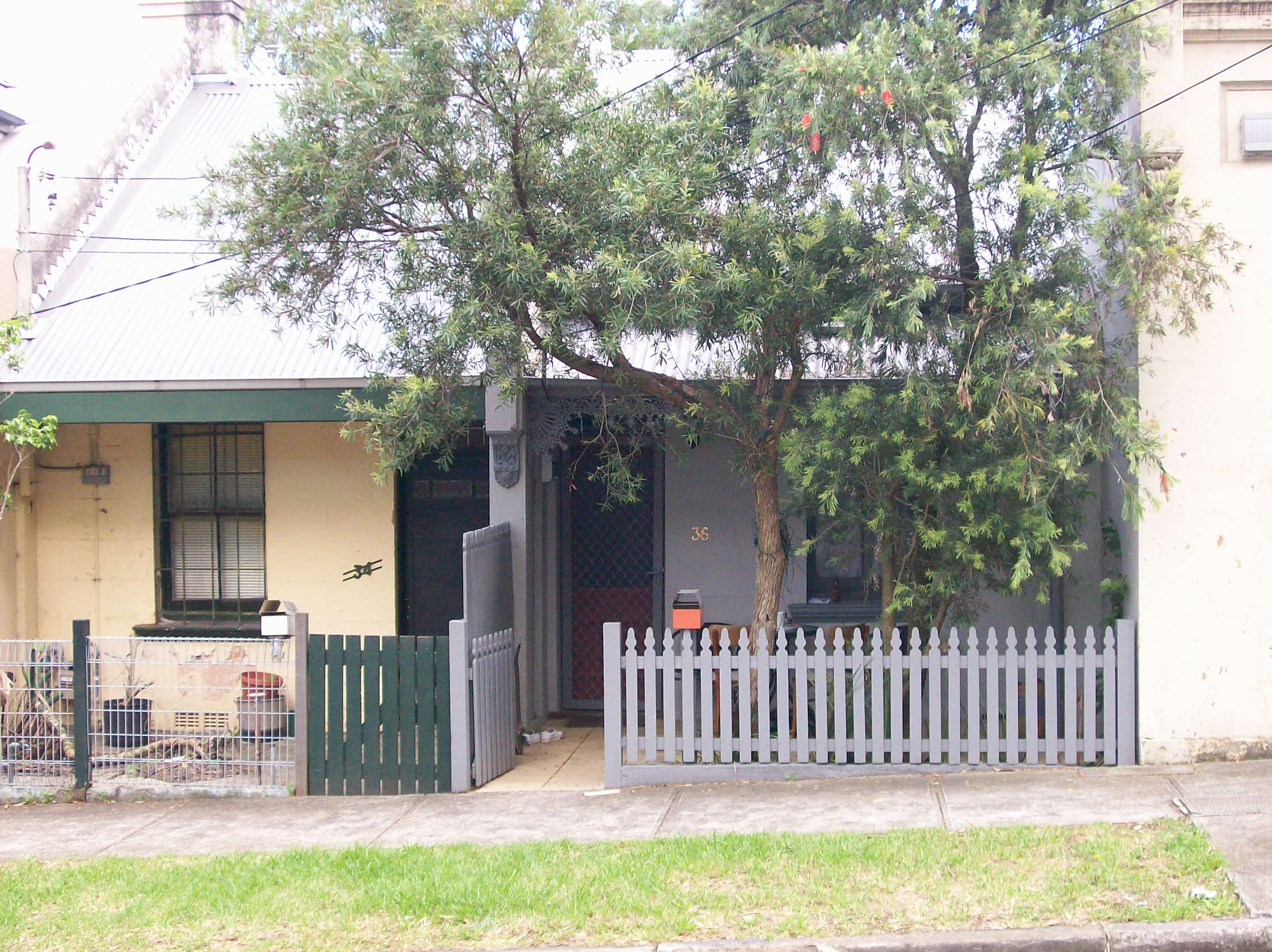
Modest single-storey terraces in Camperdown

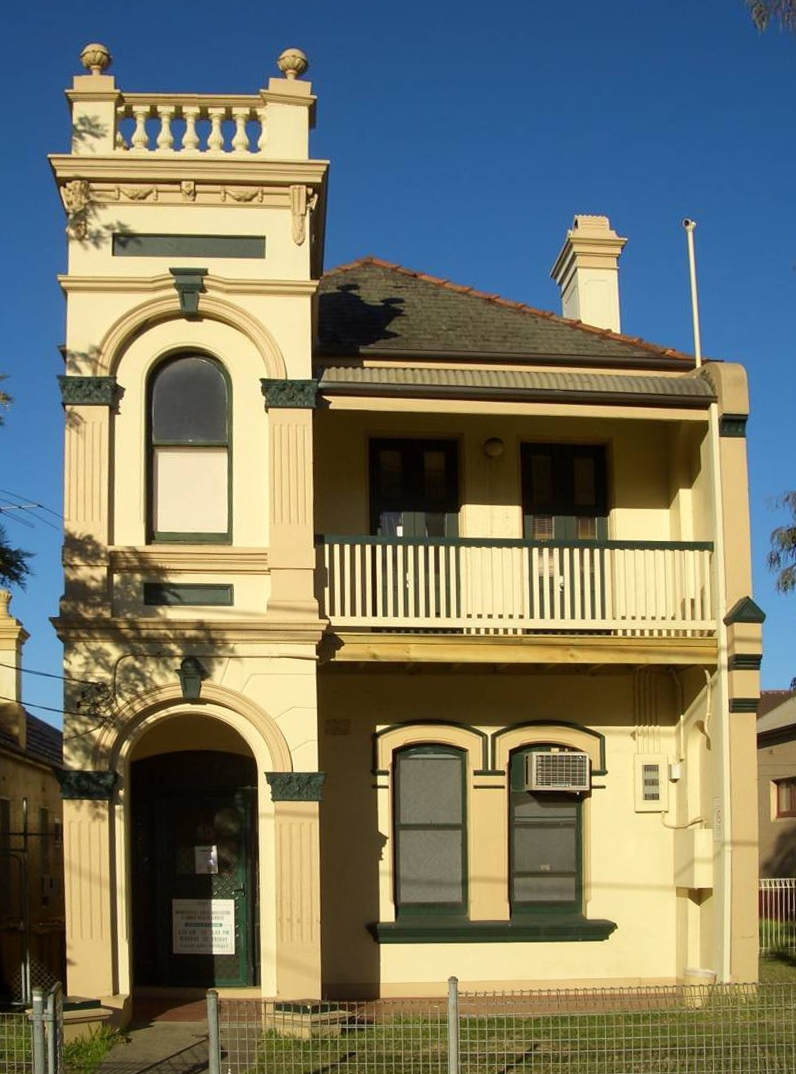
House in the suburb of Marrickville

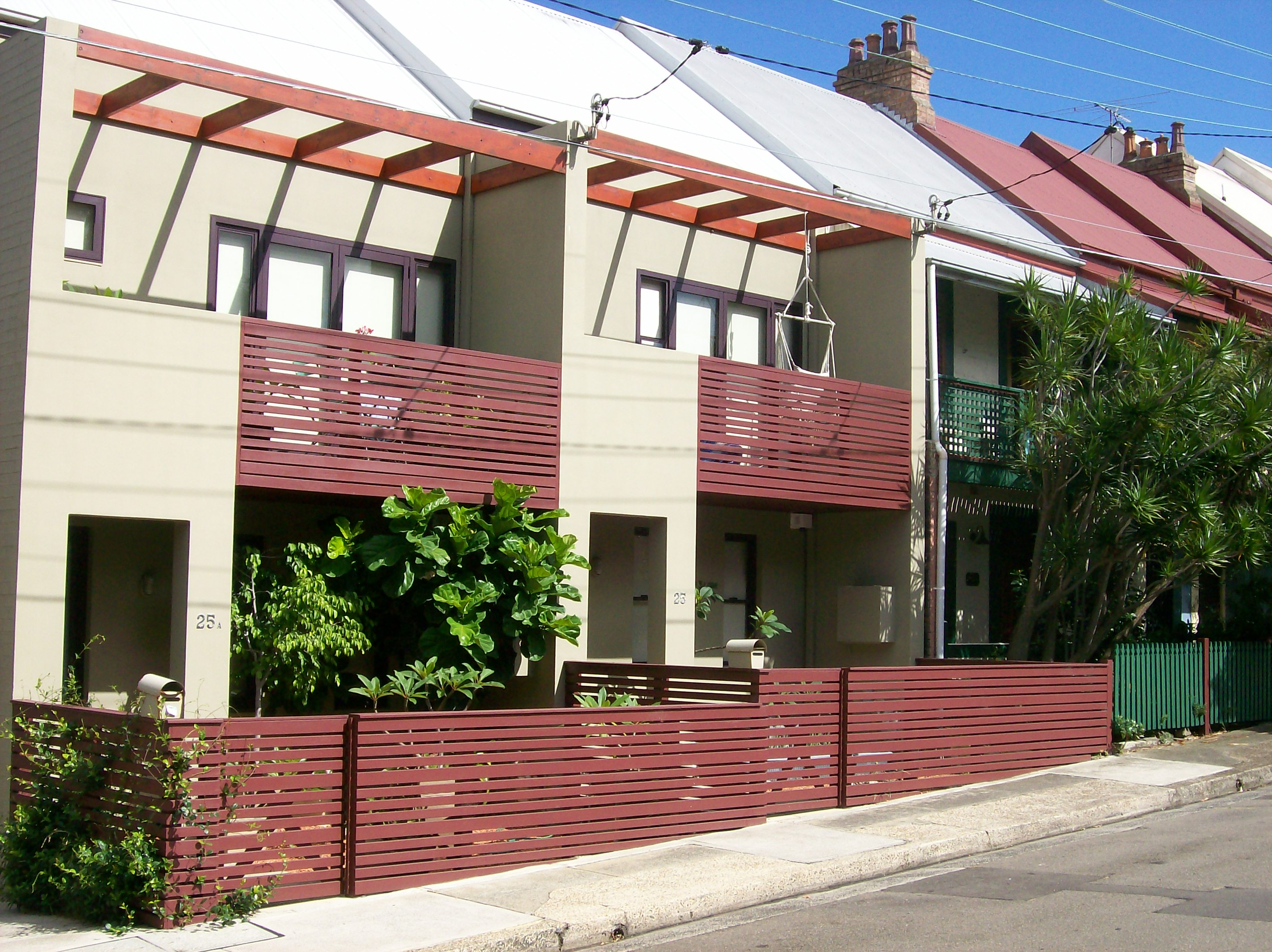
Sympathetic infill development in Camperdown

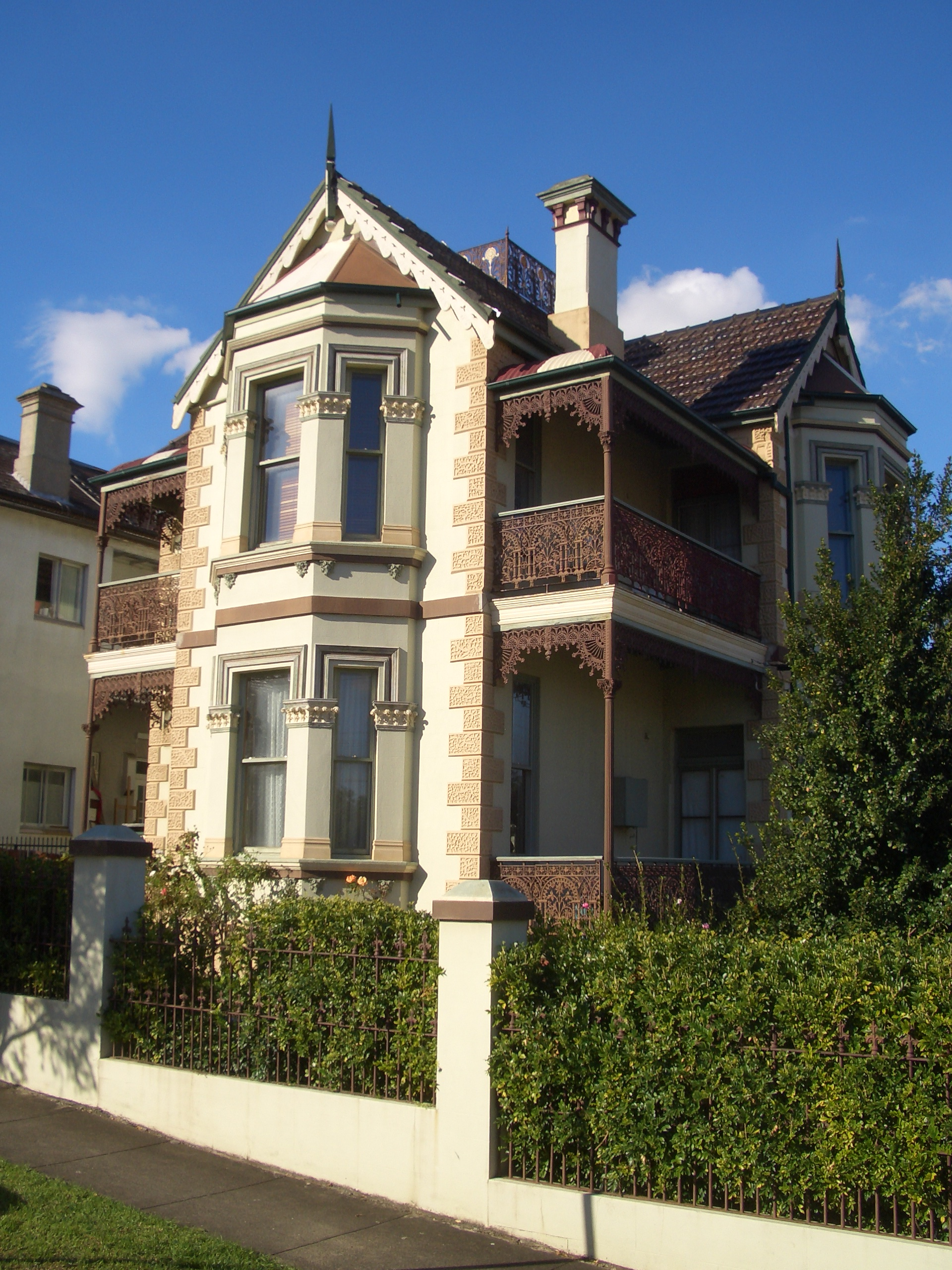
Restored house in Petersham

== Parks ==
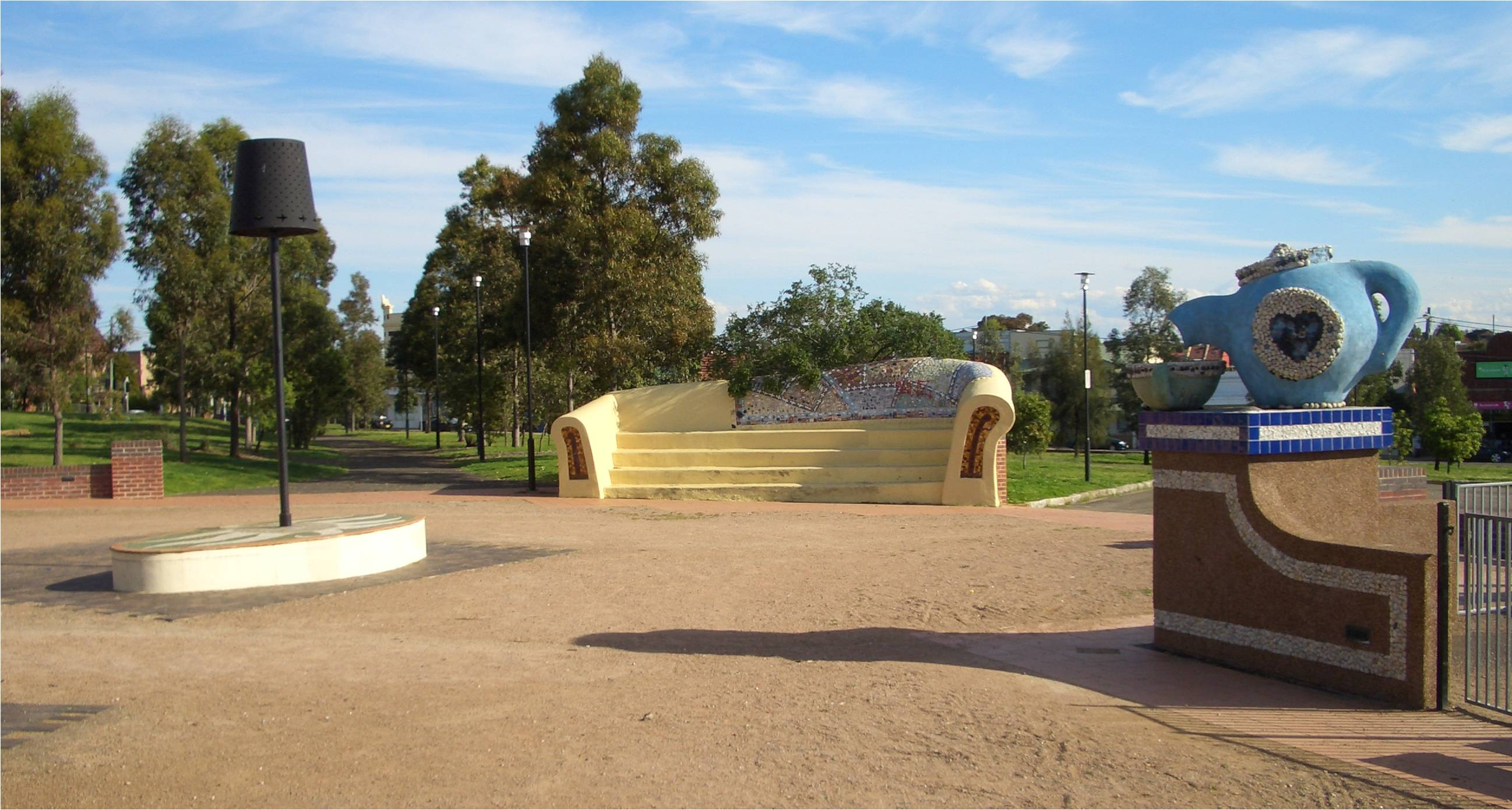
Sydenham Green, formerly the site of noise-affected homes

The Marrickville area has 88 parks and reserves of various sizes within its boundaries. Major sporting grounds include Henson Park, home of the Newtown Jets rugby league club, and Petersham Park, where Sir Donald Bradman scored his first century in grade cricket.

Tempe Lands, 10 hectares of parkland at the south-western corner of LGA, was redeveloped by Marrickville Council in 2003 on the site of a former rubbish tip at a cost of A$17.5 million. The parklands feature sporting fields, a golf driving range, and a constructed saltmarsh and ephemeral wetlands area for wildlife.

Other major parks in the area include Enmore Park, Camperdown Park, Marrickville Park, Steel Park and Camperdown Memorial Rest Park. There are also substantial parklands surrounding the Cooks River. After the completion of the airport's third runway in the mid-1990s, the Commonwealth Government controversially purchased and demolished 152 residential properties in the worst-affected parts of Sydenham. The newly vacant land, which is located not under the approach path of the third runway but under the approach/departure path for runway 16R/34L, became Sydenham Green, a public park covering 4.5 hectares. A series of oversized 'living room' sculptures (lamp, chairs and fireplace) decorate the park, paying homage to the homes that formerly occupied the site.

== Sister cities ==
Marrickville Council had sister city relations with the following cities:

- (Palestine) Bethlehem, West Bank, since 2007
- Funchal, Madeira Islands, Portugal, since 1996
- Keelung, Taiwan, since 1989
- Kos, Greece, since 1990
- Larnaca, Cyprus, since 2005
- Safita, Syria, since 2005
- Zonnebeke, Belgium, since 2007

The following cities have also signed agreements to formalise relationships with Marrickville:

- 6th of October City, Egypt
