= Tim Stephens (legal academic) =

Australian professor

Tim Stephens is professor of international law at the University of Sydney. Stephens' main areas of research are the international law of the sea and international environmental law.

== Early life ==
Stephens was educated at St Aloysius' College, Sydney, and then at the University of Sydney where he graduated with a B.A. (Hons.), LL.B. (Hons.) and a Ph.D. He studied geography and took an MPhil at the University of Cambridge (at St John's College).

== Career ==
Stephens is a legal academic. Before his appointment at the University of Sydney, he was Associate to the Hon Justice Arthur Emmett AO in the Federal Court of Australia.

Stephens has authored, co-authored, and edited twelve books, including International Courts and Environmental Protection (Cambridge University Press, Cambridge, 2009). In 2010 he was awarded the International Union for Conservation of Nature (IUCN) Academy of Environmental Law Junior Scholarship Prize for ‘outstanding scholarship and contributions in the field of international environmental law’. Stephens was President of the Australian and New Zealand Society of International Law from 2015 to 2019.

In 2014, Stephens was appointed with professor Ivan Shearer AM to the List of Experts for the South Pacific Regional Fisheries Management Organisation. In 2023 he was appointed to the List of Arbitrators under the Protocol on Environmental Protection to the Antarctic Treaty.

In 2021, Stephens was elected as a councillor on Inner West Council, representing the Leichhardt-Gulgadya Ward. Stephens' election was considered a 'surprise' as he was second on the Australian Labor Party's ticket for the ward.

Stephens is a fellow of the Australian Academy of Law and the Royal Society of New South Wales.

== Books ==
- Scott, S., Stephens, T., McGee, J. (2025). Geopolitical Change and the Antarctic Treaty System. Singapore: Springer Singapore.
- Rothwell, D., Stephens, T. (Third Edition, 2023; Second Edition, 2016; First Edition, 2010). The International Law of the Sea. Oxford, United Kingdom: Bloomsbury / Hart Publishing.
- VanderZwaag, D., Oral, N., Stephens, T. (2021). Research Handbook on Ocean Acidification Law and Policy. Cheltenham, UK: Edward Elgar Publishing.
- Craik, N., Jefferies, C., Seck, S., Stephens, T. (2018). Global Environmental Change and Innovation in International Law. Cambridge: Cambridge University Press.
- Saul, B., Stephens, T. (2015). Antarctica in International Law. United Kingdom: Bloomsbury Publishing.
- Rothwell, D., Oude Elferink, A., Scott, K., Stephens, T. (2015). The Oxford Handbook of the Law of the Sea. United Kingdom: Oxford University Press.
- Butt, S., Lyster, R., Stephens, T. (2015). Climate Change and Forest Governance: Lessons from Indonesia. United Kingdom: Routledge.
- Stephens, T., VanderZwaag, D. (2014). Polar Oceans Governance in an Era of Environmental Change. Cheltenham & Northampton: Edward Elgar Publishing.
- Saul, B., Sherwood, S., McAdam, J., Stephens, T., Slezak, J. (2012). Climate Change and Australia: Warming to the Global Challenge. Sydney: The Federation Press.
- Tim Stephens (2009). International Courts and Environmental Protection. Cambridge University Press. ISBN 978-0-521-88122-7.
