= Local Government Act 1993 =

Law in New South Wales, Australia

Parliament of New South Wales
- Long title: An Act to provide for local government in New South Wales.
- Citation: Local Government Act 1993 (NSW) (Act No. 30 of 1993)
- Passed by: Legislative Assembly
- Passed: 20 May 1993
- Passed by: Legislative Council
- Passed: 21 May 1993
- Assented to by: Governor Peter Sinclair
- Assented to: 8 June 1993
- Commenced: 1 July 1993

Legislative history

Initiating chamber: Legislative Assembly
- Bill title: Local Government Bill 1993
- Introduced by: Gerald Peacocke
- First reading: 11 March 1993
- Second reading: 28 April 1993
- Third reading: 20 May 1993

Revising chamber: Legislative Council
- First reading: 20 May 1993
- Second reading: 21 May 1993
- Third reading: 21 May 1993
- Status: Amended

The Local Government Act 1993 is a law enacted by the New South Wales Parliament that outlines where local government areas in New South Wales are to be located and what their priorities should be. The Act describes how councillors and mayors should be directly elected. It sets out the fundamental rules governing local councils and outlines their functions. The legislation has been amended various times.

== Development ==
The first incarnations of local government came prior to the adoption of responsible government in New South Wales and were originally not part of legislation. By 1858, the first Act was introduced and so the functions of local government were legislated for the first time. This legislation was seen as inadequate due to limited franchise, limited revenue raising abilities and lack of regulation. The government then passed the Local Government (Shires) Act in 1905, creating new administrative areas. Another act was then enacted titled the Local Government Act 1906.

In 1919, a new Local Government Act was legislated, including expansion of the franchise to more voters, compulsory voting, removed the requirement for the governor to sign off on measures passed by councils, and encouraged amalgamations.

In 1990, the minister for local government could see that the 1919 Act had outlived its usefulness as councils began fulfilling a much larger role than originally intended in the old legislation and the 1919 Act had been amended too many times, resulting in an unwieldy document. A white paper was subsequently released and was followed by a discussion paper in August 1991 which set up a process to review the 1919 legislation. The proposed new legislation was charged with three main tasks, those being, that councils of all sizes should be well-catered for, to ensure appropriate state and local accountability, and to allow councils to operate well with minimal intervention by the state government.

The government led by John Fahey sought to set in motion the process of legislating a new Local Government Act, with the original bill being introduced in November 1992 and an amended copy of the bill being introduced in March 1993. The bill was amended approximately 400 times while in parliament. The bill finally passed both chambers of parliament and was granted royal assent by governor Peter Sinclair on 8 June 1993. The new Act commenced on 1 July of that year.

Local government was made a part of the state's Constitution Act 1902 in 1986. There have been various proposals and referendums to enshrine local governmental powers in the federal constitution but these propositions have never been enacted.

== Legislative instruments ==
In 2021, a regulation titled the Local Government (General) Regulation 2021 was published which specifies further details regarding the functions of local government authorities. The regulation has a provision whereby it was automatically repealed on 1 September 2025. The regulation itself has been amended various times to cater for differing circumstances. Former regulations were published in 2005 and 1999, among with various other pieces of legislation pertaining to specific functions of a local government body, however these have now been subsumed by the 2021 general regulation.

The City of Sydney is also empowered by the City of Sydney Act 1988, though the Local Government Act 1993 and its associated legislative instruments play some role in regulating the council.

In 2014, the City of Sydney Act 1988 was amended (via the City of Sydney Amendment (Elections) Act 2014) to give businesses a second vote in council elections, but this provision was repealed by the state's Labor government in September 2023 on the basis that these changes had dramatically failed. When the amendments were introduced in 2014, allegations were made that they were part of the then-Liberal government's campaign to 'get Clover Moore [sic]'.

=== Other legislative instruments ===
The principal Local Government Act 1993 has been amended by numerous pieces of legislation that may be repealed or are listed as not currently in force on AustLII.

The following is a list of currently in force Acts and regulations that contain local government provisions:

- Companion Animals Act 1998 (NSW) (Act No. 87 of 1998)
- Local Government (Armidale and Inverell—Alteration of Boundaries) Proclamation 2019 (NSW) (Reg No. 59 of 2019)
- Local Government (Bayside) Proclamation 2016 (NSW) (Reg No. 581 of 2016)
- Local Government (City of Parramatta and Cumberland) Proclamation 2016 (NSW) (Reg No. 241 of 2016)
- Local Government (Dissolution of New England County Council) Proclamation 2025 (NSW) (Reg No. 257 of 2025)
- Local Government (Manufactured Home Estates, Caravan Parks, Camping Grounds and Moveable Dwellings) Regulation 2021 (NSW) (Reg No. 461 of 2021)
- Local Government (Newcastle Fruit and Vegetable Market) Act 1972 (NSW) (Act No. 35 of 1927)
- Local Government (Regional Joint Organisations) Proclamation 2018 (NSW) (Reg No. 192 of 2018)
- Local Government Amendment (Governance and Planning) Act 2016 (NSW) (Act No. 38 of 2016)
- Local Government and Other Authorities (Superannuation) Act 1927 (NSW) (Act No. 35 of 1927)
- Local Government Amendment Act 2019 (NSW) (Act No. 6 of 2019)
- Sydney Olympic Park Authority Act 2001 (NSW) (Reg No. 57 of 2001)

== Review ==
In 1999, a report was presented to parliament following a review which stated that the Act placed "far greater responsibility on councillors and staff to perform well" and that "there is wide support for the objectives of the 1993 Act".

== 2012 amendment ==
In 2012, the legislation was amended (via the Local Government Amendment (Members of Parliament) Act 2012) to include a provision whereby a person could not serve as a member of parliament and a local government official simultaneously — either as mayor or councillor.

Allegations were made that this amendment to the act was meant to remove the City of Sydney's Lord Mayor Clover Moore from the mayoralty but Moore chose to stay in her local government office. Premier Barry O'Farrell denied that the amendment was targeted directly at Moore. In the subsequent by-election, the candidate that was supported by Moore, Alex Greenwich, won the contest, who cited anger at the fact Moore was forcefully ejected from parliament.

== Amalgamations ==
Beginning in 2015, premier Mike Baird announced plans to amalgamate certain local councils following an inquiry by the independent pricing and regulatory tribunal (IPART). A parliamentary upper house (Legislative Council) inquiry later found IPART's process to be flawed.

On 7 November 2016, the Local Government (Council Amalgamations) Proclamation 2016 was signed into law, dissolving some local councils and reconstituting them with larger areas and enacting the majority of the proposed council mergers. Some of the councils affected by these proposals initiated legal action with the state government seeking to alter or reverse these actions.

Newly installed premier Gladys Berejiklian called off the regional and rural council amalgamations in February 2017. The prior announcement was followed in July 2017 with Berejiklian announcing that the government's efforts to push through amalgamations to all affected councils would be halted.

In 2019, the auditor general reported that the council amalgamations had largely achieved what the government set out to do in undertaking these reforms.

In 2025, the Labor government simplified the part of this legislation that enables de-amalgamation processes. Several proposals to reverse amalgamation processes have been proposed with some being denied and some acted upon by the minister for local government, Ron Hoenig.

Such councils that have proposed de-amalgamation include Cootamundra–Gundagai Regional Council (who have been successful), Inner West Council (which residents have supported but the government has rejected), Snowy Valleys Council (who the minister has supported de-merging following a referendum), Bayside Council (who have ceased investigating a de-merger following a negative response from residents) and the City of Canterbury Bankstown (which they have voted to abandon).
