= Leichhardt Town Hall =

Landmark civic building in Leichhardt, suburb of Sydney, Australia

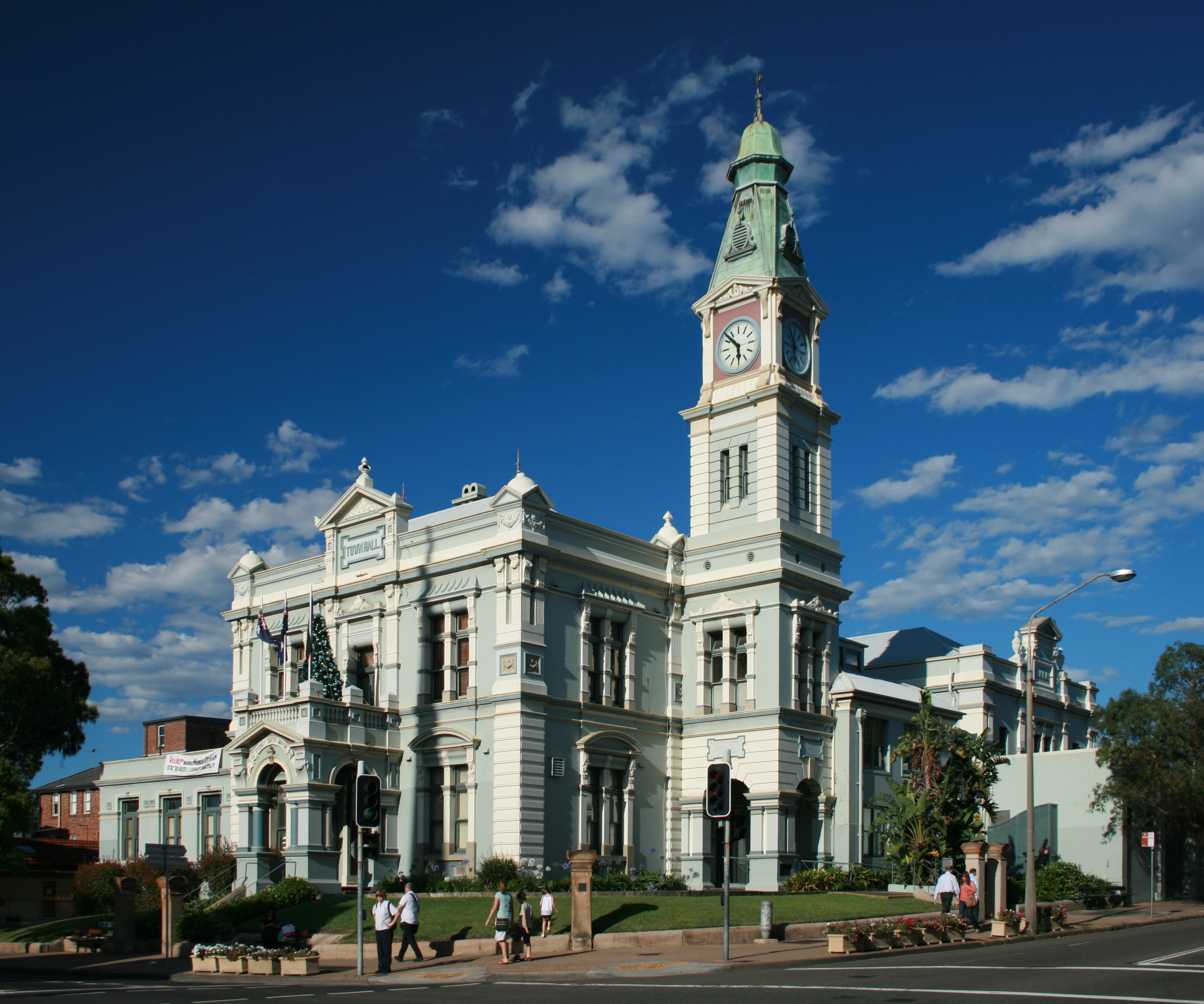
- Leichhardt Town Hall, pictured in 2010
- Interactive map of the Leichhardt Town Hall area

General information
- Type: Government town hall
- Architectural style: Victorian Italianate style
- Location: 107 Norton Street, Leichhardt, New South Wales, Australia
- Coordinates: 33.8835°S 151.1574°E
- Construction started: January 1888
- Completed: September 1888
- Client: Leichhardt Municipal Council
- Owner: Inner West Council (current)

Design and construction
- Architects: Drake and Walcott
- Main contractor: Tabrett and Draper

Register of the National Estate
- Official name: Leichhardt Town Hall
- Type: Historic
- Designated: 21 March 1978
- Part of: Leichhardt Civic Precinct
- Reference no.: 1670

New South Wales Heritage Database (Local Government Register)
- Official name: Leichhardt Town Hall
- Type: Built
- Criteria: a., b., c., d., f., g.
- Designated: 23 December 2013
- Reference no.: Local register
- Group collection: Community Facilities
- Category: Hall; Town Hall

The Leichhardt Town Hall is a landmark civic building in Leichhardt, a suburb of Sydney, Australia. It stands at 107 Norton Street. It was built in 1888 in the Victorian Italianate style by architects Drake and Walcott. The Town Hall was the seat of Leichhardt Municipal Council from 1888 to 2016 and is now one of the seats of the new Inner West Council. The hall is listed on the (now defunct) Australian Register of the National Estate and the local government heritage database.

== History and description ==
When the Municipality of Leichhardt was proclaimed in 1871, the council first started meeting in a former inn. This building proved thoroughly inadequate for the purposes of a municipal administration, with The Sydney Morning Herald noting in December 1887 that the council chambers were:

"about as inconvenient and insignificant in appearance as could well be imagined. Originally a wayside inn, it has undergone very slight change; even the bar and shelves in the front room remain intact, but one important difference may be noted, viz., that whereas the shelves were formerly filled with bottles containing wines and spirits, the only occupants now are two small oil lamps. The accommodation is necessarily of the most meagre description."

As a consequence, at the meeting of the council 13 June 1887, Alderman Walsh introduced a motion that £4000 "be placed to the credit of a Town Hall Account in the Bank of Australasia, Leichhardt, and be reserved for expenses in connection with the building of a Town Hall at the corner of Norton and Marion streets." Despite concerns over the cost of such a project, the motion was carried in a division of 5 votes to 4. A subsequent special meeting convened on 15 August, and selected a Victorian Italianate style design by architects, Drake and Walcott, of Pitt Street, Sydney. The foundation stone of the new hall was laid in a ceremony on 7 January 1888 by the Mayoress, the wife of Mayor Benjamin Moore. Stated to be "one of the finest municipal buildings in the colony", the hall was completed eight months later at the cost of £5600 and was formally opened, albeit with an incomplete tower, on 26 September 1888 by the Governor of New South Wales, Lord Carrington, in the presence of Mayor Sydney Smith and Sir Henry Parkes.

The clock within the tower was not installed until 1897 to commemorate the 60 years of Queen Victoria’s reign and was unveiled on 22 June 1897 by the Mayoress, wife of mayor Robert Cropley. A branch of the Australian Joint Stock Bank operated in the north western section of the building from 1888 to 1895 when a library was established with a separate entry from Marion Street.

== Gallery ==
Sketch of the Town Hall in the Sydney Mail, 1888

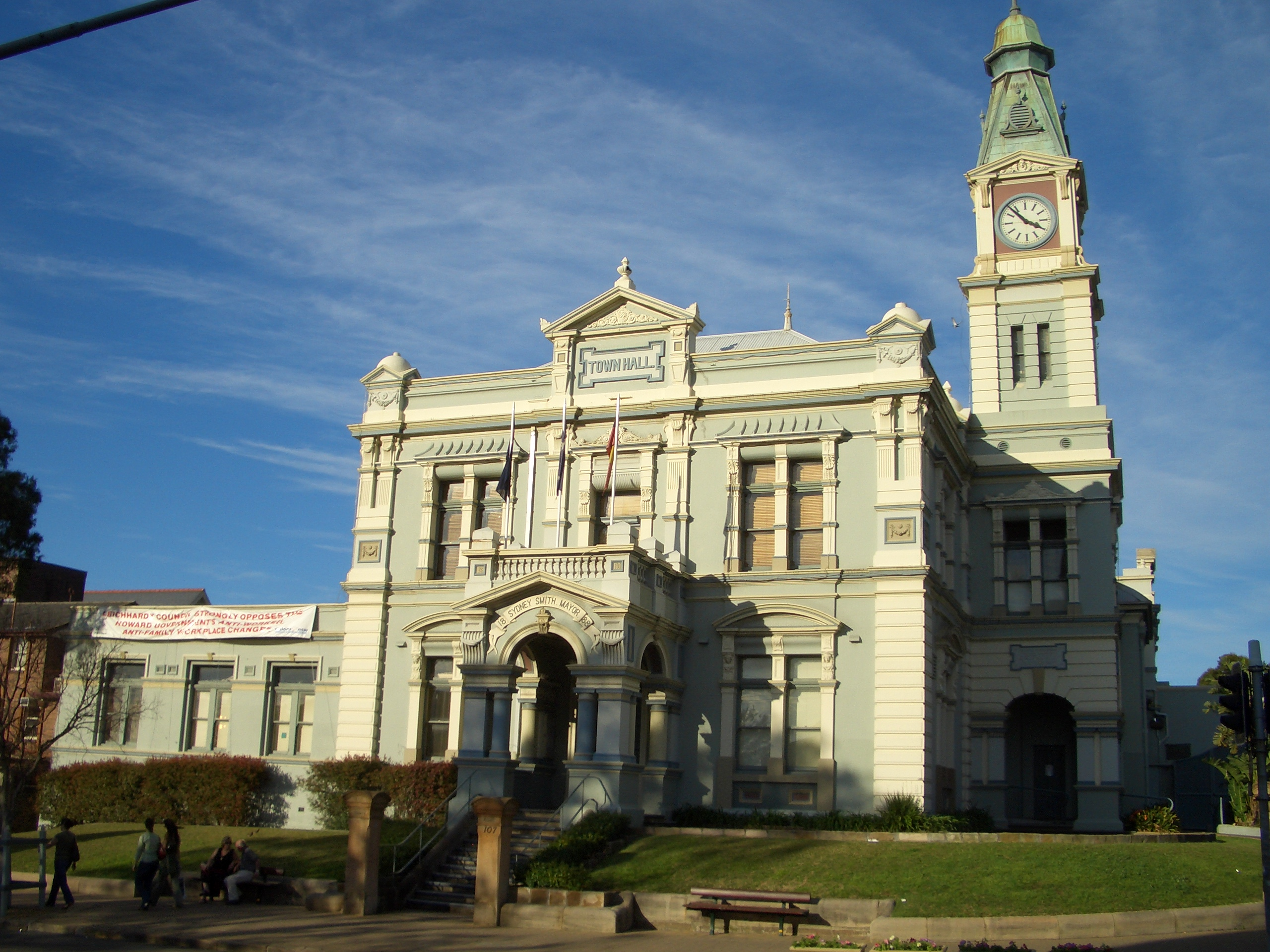
Town Hall in 2006

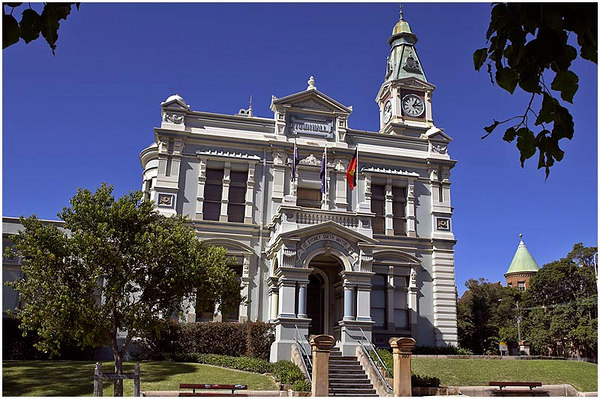
Town Hall in 2007

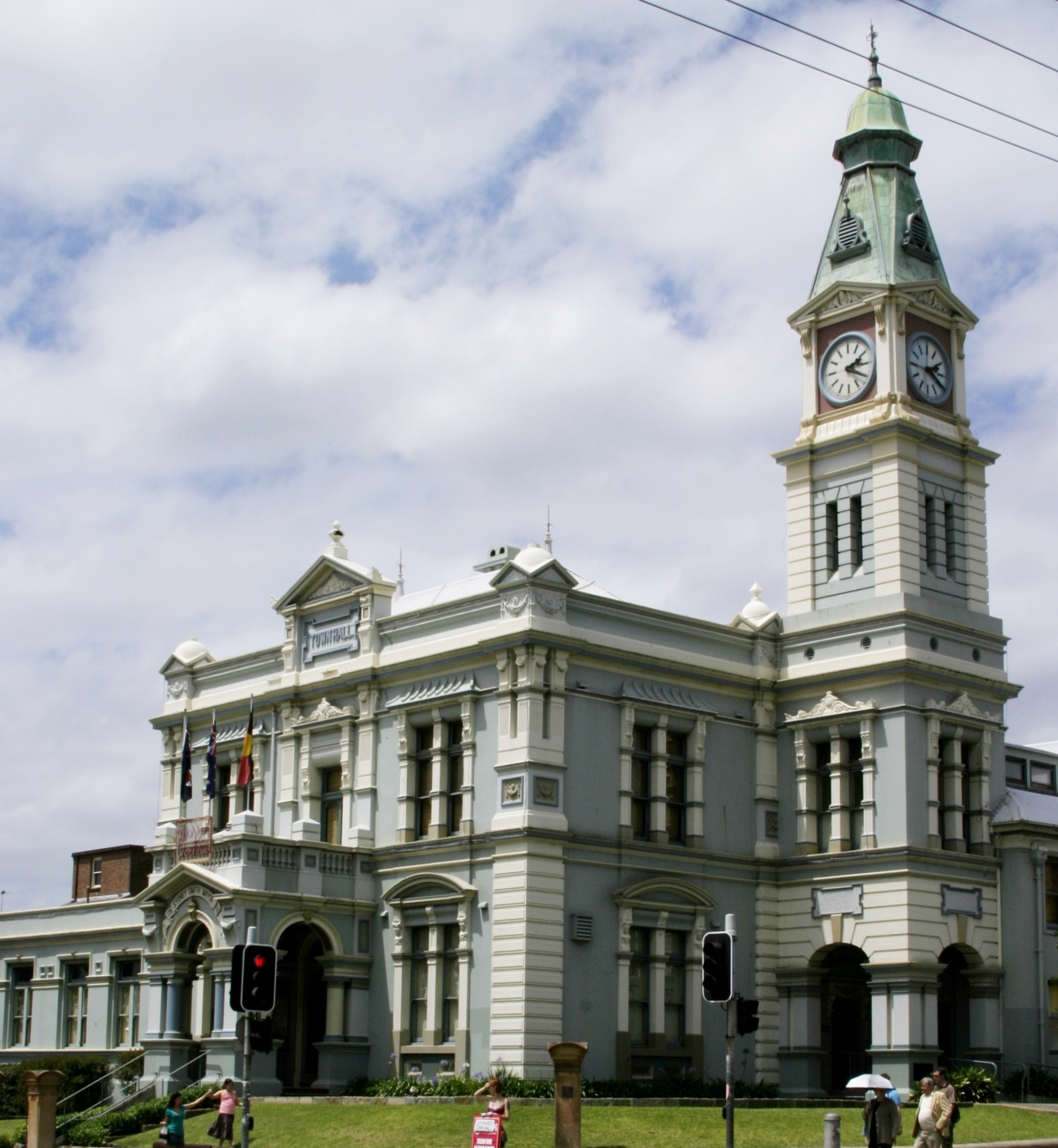
Town Hall in 2008

== See also ==
- List of town halls in Sydney
- Architecture of Sydney
