= Municipality of Leichhardt =

Former local government area in New South Wales, Australia

- Local government area
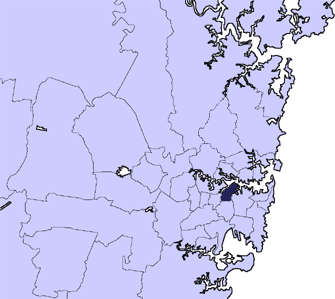
- Location in Metropolitan Sydney

- Coordinates: 33°53′S 151°09′E
- Country: Australia
- State: New South Wales
- Established: 29 December 1871
- Abolished: 12 May 2016
- Council seat: Leichhardt Town Hall

Area
  - Total: 11 km^{2} (4.2 sq mi)

Population
  - Total: 52,198 (2011 census)
  - Density: 4,745.3/km^{2} (12,290/sq mi)
LGAs around Municipality of Leichhardt
| Canada Bay | Parramatta River | Sydney |
| Ashfield | Municipality of Leichhardt | Sydney |
| Ashfield | Marrickville | Sydney |

The Municipality of Leichhardt was a local government area in the inner-west region of Sydney, New South Wales, Australia. It is about 10 kilometres (6.2 mi) west of the Sydney central business district. On 12 May 2016, Leichhardt merged with Marrickville Council and the Municipality of Ashfield to form the Inner West Council.

The last mayor of the Leichhardt Municipal Council was Cr. Darcy Byrne, a member of Labor Party.

In December 2021, a majority of voters in Inner West Council voted in favour of reversing the 2016 merger and separating the three pre-existing councils of Ashfield, Leichhardt and Marrickville.

== Suburbs in the local government area ==
Suburbs in the Municipality of Leichhardt were:

- Annandale (with parts located in City of Sydney)
- Balmain
- Balmain East
- Birchgrove
- Cockatoo Island
- Leichhardt
- Lilyfield
- Rozelle

== Demographics ==
At the 2011 Census, there were 52,198 people in the Leichhardt local government area, of these 47.4% were male and 52.6% were female. Aboriginal and Torres Strait Islander people made up 1.0% of the population. The median age of people in the Municipality of Leichhardt was 37 years. Children aged 0 – 14 years made up 16.8% of the population and people aged 65 years and over made up 10.3% of the population. Of people in the area aged 15 years and over, 40.9% were married and 12.6% were either divorced or separated.

Population in the Municipality of Leichhardt between the 2001 Census and the 2006 Census decreased by 20.2%. This was due to an alteration of the boundary between Leichhardt and the Sydney local government areas that took effect in 2003. The suburbs of Glebe, Forest Lodge and parts of Annandale were transferred from Leichhardt to the City of Sydney. In the subsequent five years from the 2006 Census to the 2011 Census, population growth was 7.02%. When compared with total population growth of Australia in the most recent Census, being 8.32%, population growth in the Leichhardt local government area was slightly lower than the national average. The median weekly income for residents within the Municipality of Leichhardt was significantly higher than the national average.

As at the 2011 Census, the Municipality of Leichhardt had approximately double the national and state average of people who spoke Italian at home; and just under double the New South Wales average of people who claimed Italian ancestry.

Selected historical census data for Leichhardt local government area
| Census year | | 2001 | 2006 | 2011 |
|---|---|---|---|---|
| Population | Estimated residents on Census night^{a} | 61,101 | 48,776 | 52,198 |
| Population | LGA rank in terms of size within New South Wales | | 55 | |
| Population | % of New South Wales population | | | 0.75% |
| Population | % of Australian population | 0.32% | ▼0.25% | ▼0.24% |
| Cultural and language diversity | | | | |
| Ancestry, top responses | Australian | | | 21.0% |
| Ancestry, top responses | English | | | 25.9% |
| Ancestry, top responses | Irish | | | 11.1% |
| Ancestry, top responses | Scottish | | | 7.6% |
| Ancestry, top responses | Italian | | | 4.7% |
| Language, top responses (other than English) | Italian | 3.4% | 3.4% | ▼3.0% |
| Language, top responses (other than English) | Greek | 1.6% | ▼1.5% | ▼1.4% |
| Language, top responses (other than English) | Spanish | 0.9% | 0.9% | ▲1.0% |
| Language, top responses (other than English) | Cantonese | 1.0% | ▼0.8% | 0.8% |
| Language, top responses (other than English) | Mandarin | n/c | n/c | ▲0.7% |
| Religious affiliation | | | | |
| Religious affiliation, top responses | No religion | 24.3% | ▲27.1% | ▲35.0% |
| Religious affiliation, top responses | Catholic | 27.2% | ▲27.6% | ▼26.7% |
| Religious affiliation, top responses | Anglican | 17.2% | ▼16.3% | ▼13.8% |
| Religious affiliation, top responses | Eastern Orthodox | 2.9% | ▼2.8% | ▼2.7% |
| Religious affiliation, top responses | Buddhism | n/c | n/c | ▲2.1% |
| Median weekly incomes | | | | |
| Personal income | Median weekly personal income | | A$895 | A$1,086 |
| Personal income | % of Australian median income | | 192.1% | 188.2% |
| Family income | Median weekly family income | | A$1,733 | A$2,738 |
| Family income | % of Australian median income | | 168.7% | 184.9% |
| Household income | Median weekly household income | | A$2,307 | A$2,234 |
| Household income | % of Australian median income | | 197.0% | 181.0% |

== Council ==
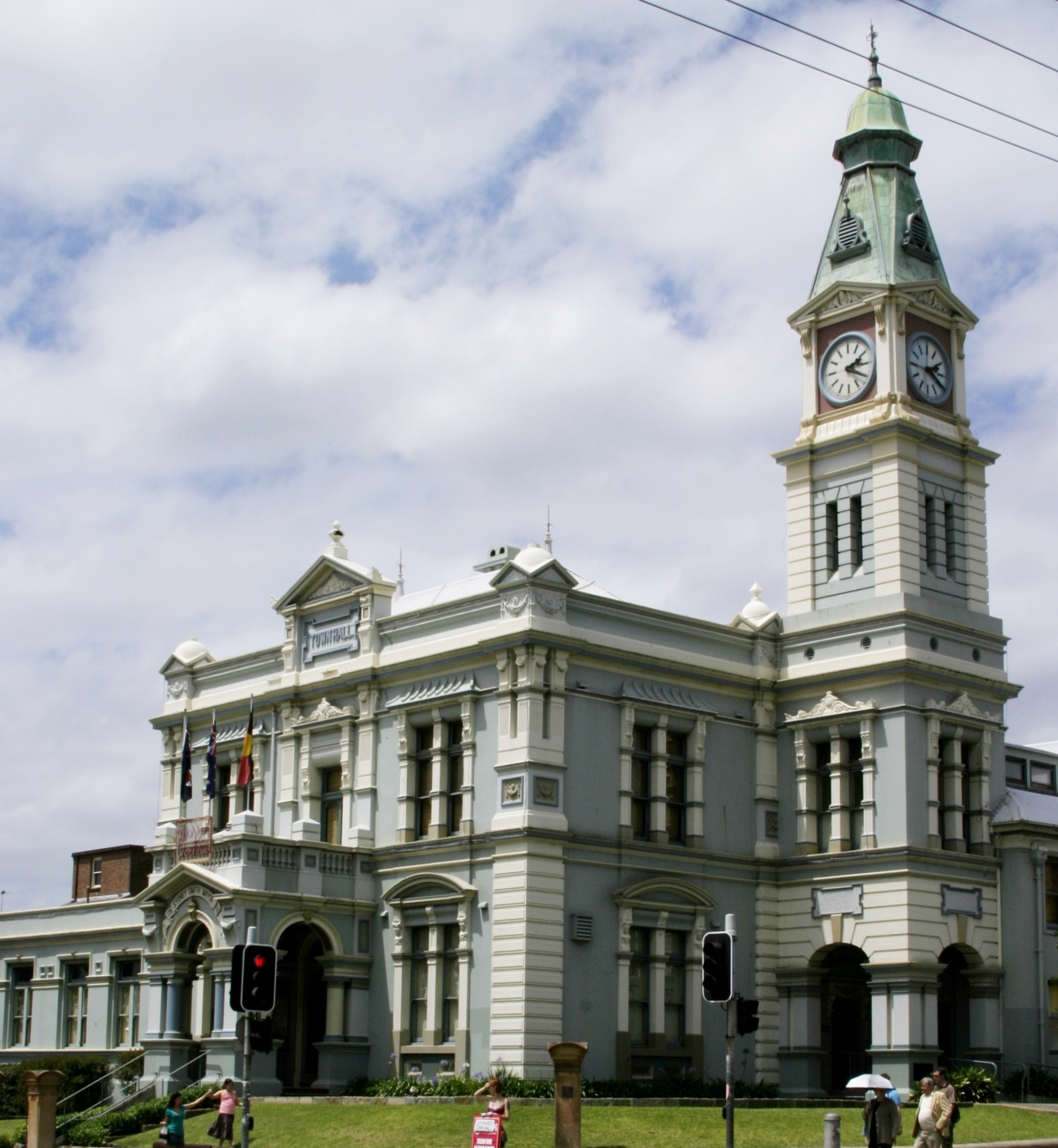
Leichhardt Town Hall

Leichhardt Municipal Council was composed of twelve Councillors elected proportionally as four separate wards, each electing three councillors. All councillors were elected for a fixed four-year term of office, with the mayor elected annually by the councillors at the first meeting of the council. The last election was held on 8 September 2012, and the final makeup of the council was as follows:

| Ward | Councillor | Party | Notes |
|---|---|---|---|
| Birrabirragal/Balmain | Craig Channells | The Greens | |
| Birrabirragal/Balmain | John Stamolis | | Elected August 2014 following death of Liberal councillor Melinda Manikas on 7 May 2014. |
| Birrabirragal/Balmain | Frank Breen | Labor | |
| Eora/Leichhardt-Lilyfield | Rochelle Porteous | The Greens | |
| Eora/Leichhardt-Lilyfield | Tony Costantino | Liberal | |
| Eora/Leichhardt-Lilyfield | Simon Emsley | Labor | |
| Gadigal/Annandale-Leichhardt | Daniel Kogoy | The Greens | |
| Gadigal/Annandale-Leichhardt | Vera-Ann Hannaford | Liberal | Deputy mayor |
| Gadigal/Annandale-Leichhardt | Linda Kelly | Labor | |
| Wangal/Rozelle-Lilyfield | Darcy Byrne | Labor | mayor |
| Wangal/Rozelle-Lilyfield | Michele McKenzie | The Greens | |
| Wangal/Rozelle-Lilyfield | John Jobling | Liberal | |

== History ==
The Municipality of Leichhardt operates over land that prehistorically belonged to the Gadigal and Wangal people, of the Eora nation. It has a long cultural heritage that comes from its Sydney Harbour location and its old suburb origins.

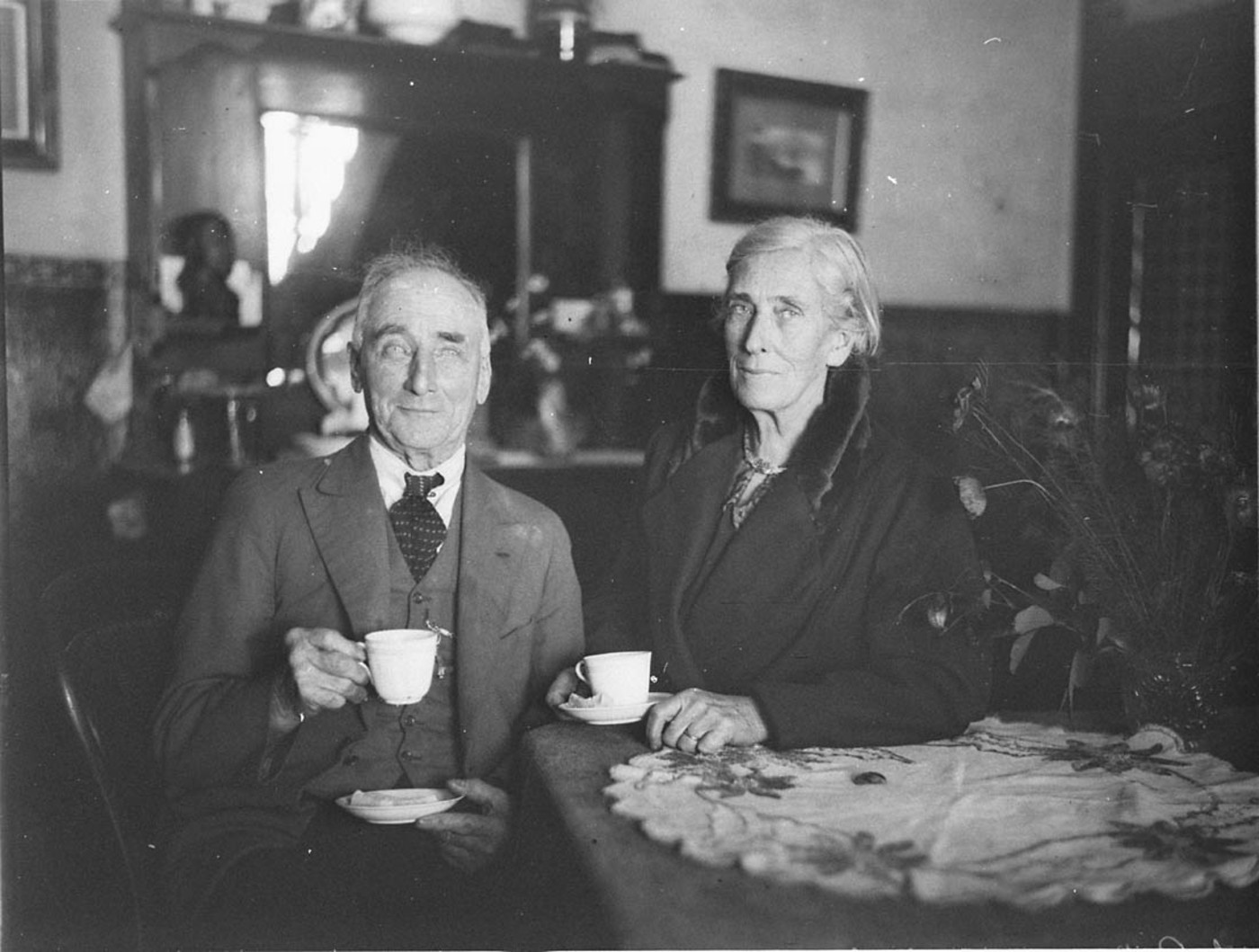
Old couple having tea (ALP Municipal elections, Balmain)

Leichhardt is named after the Prussian explorer Ludwig Leichhardt, who in the 1840s was feted for his 4,800 kilometres (3,000 mi) expedition in search of an overland route from southern Queensland to Port Essington, a British settlement on the far northern coast of Australia that is approximately 300 kilometres (190 mi) to the north of the modern city of Darwin. He later famously vanished without trace on his attempt to cross the continent from the Darling Downs to the Swan River Colony on the Western Australia coast.

Leichhardt was proclaimed a municipality on 29 December 1871. In 1893, the East Ward of the Municipality separated and became the Borough of Annandale. In 1949, it was merged with the municipalities of Annandale and Balmain. In 1967, the municipal boundary was altered to include Glebe and parts of Camperdown. In 2003, the municipal boundary was again changed, to exclude the Annandale Foreshore (land between The Crescent and Rozelle Bay), Glebe and Forest Lodge, which are now part of the City of Sydney. Since the middle of the 20th century, Leichhardt has been a centre for Sydney's Italian community.

Leichhardt is also home to the first non-government women's health centre to be established in Australia. On International Women's Day 1974, the Leichhardt Women's Community Health Centre opened as a result of grass-roots lobbying from women in the community and Sydney's Women's Liberation Movement. Initially funded through Federal Government funds, the centre is now funded mainly by the NSW Health and continues to run multi-disciplinary health care clinics and health education from its base in Leichhardt and in outreach locations throughout Sydney's inner west.

=== Amalgamation ===
A 2015 review of local government boundaries recommended that the Municipality of Leichhardt merge with the Municipality of Ashfield and the Marrickville Council to form a new council with an area of 35 square kilometres (14 sq mi) and support a population of approximately 186,000. On 12 May 2016 Leichhardt Council was dissolved and merged with neighbours Municipality of Ashfield and Marrickville Council to form the Inner West Council.

== Parks and recreation ==
Leichhardt Park, which includes the Leichhardt Park Aquatic Centre is in Lilyfield, as is Leichhardt Oval in Mary Street, the homeground of the Wests Tigers.

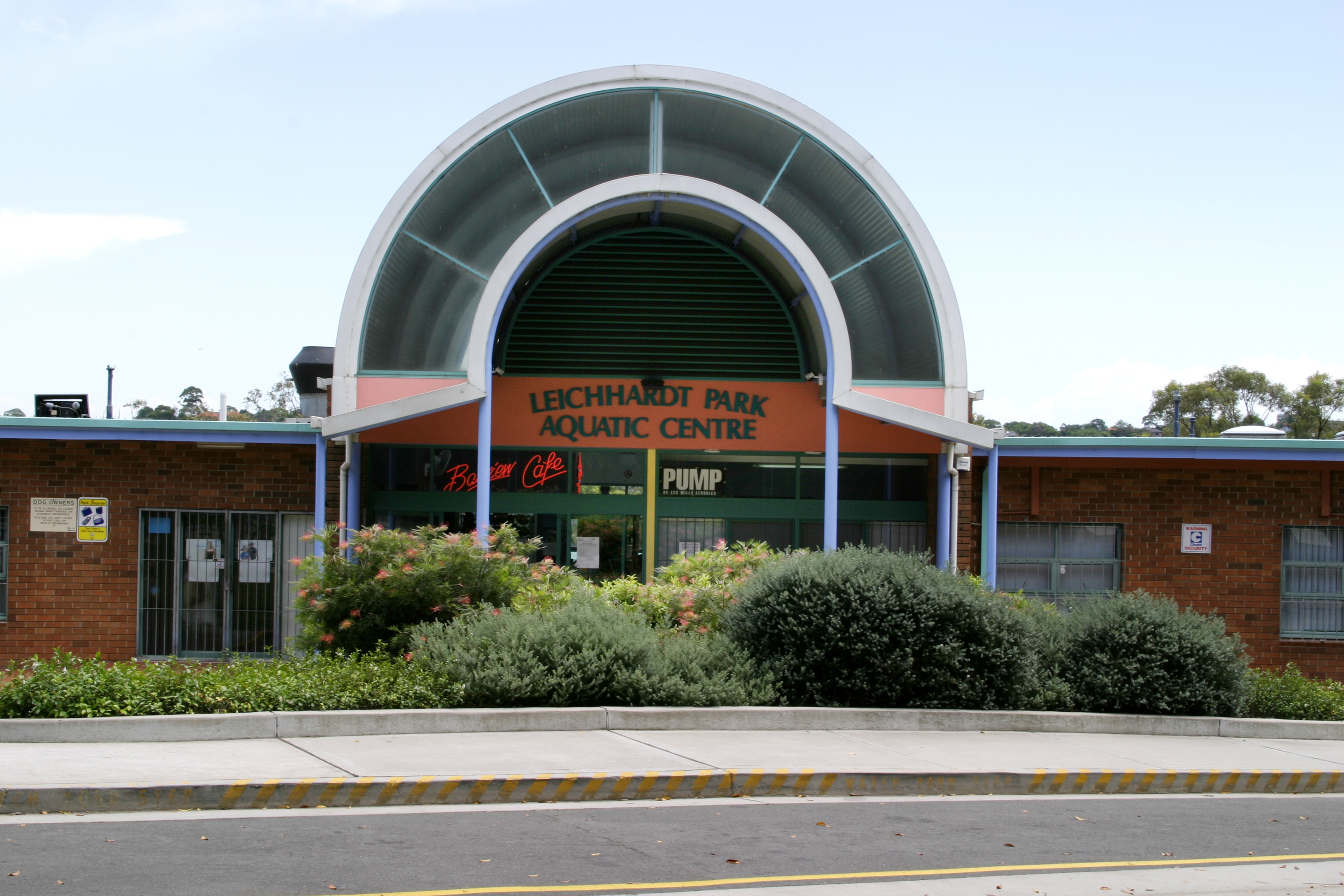
Leichhardt Park Aquatic Centre

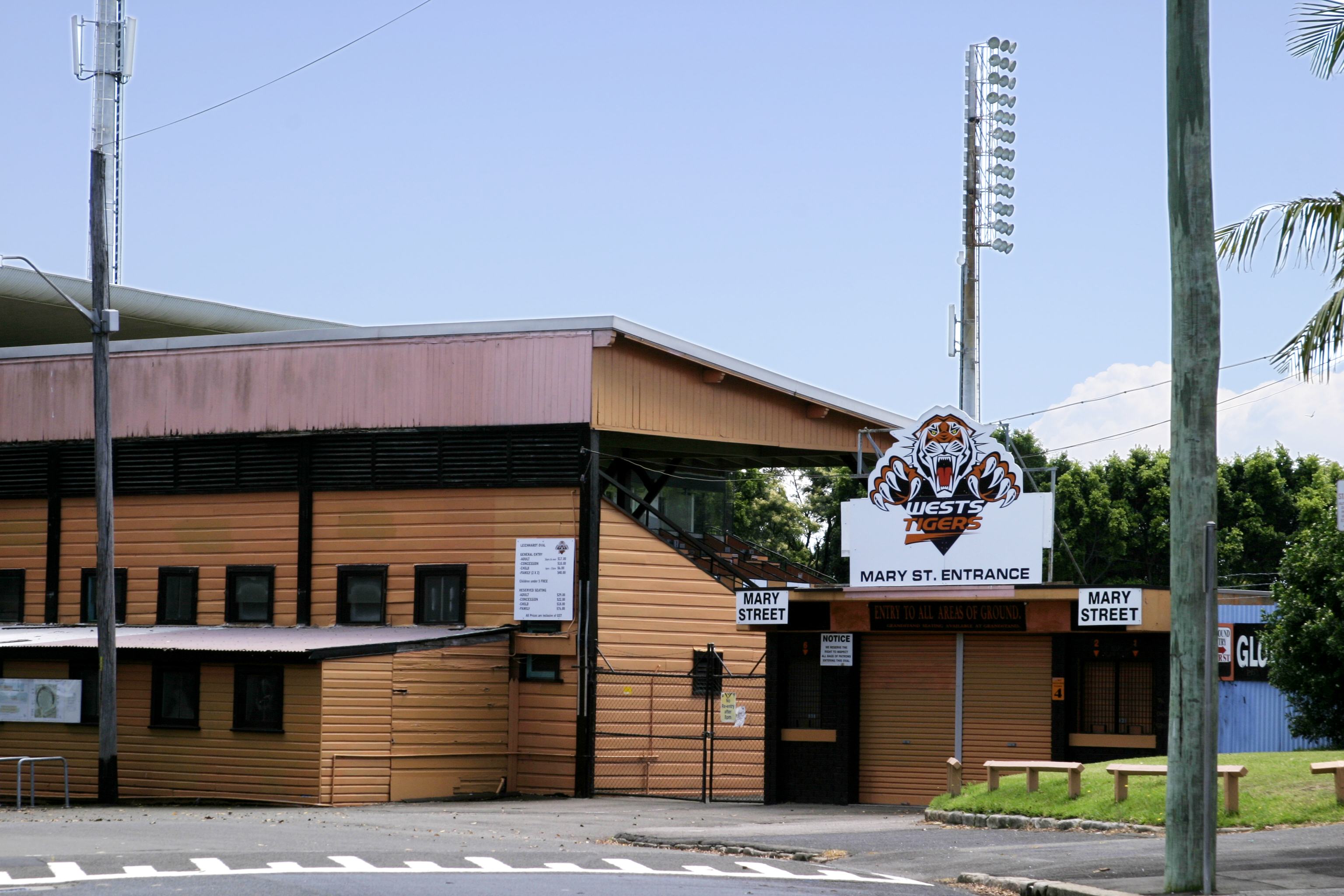
Leichhardt Oval (South Entrance), Mary Street

The Bay Run around Iron Cove is a popular bicycling, walking and running track, passing along the foreshore of Lilyfield and Rozelle, and linking to paths along Hawthorne Canal on the western border of Leichhardt.

Callan Park in Lilyfield, bordering Iron Cove, offers open space for walking, cycling and passive recreation.

Pioneer Memorial Park in Norton Street, Leichhardt, has gardens and paths for passive recreation. It is built on the site of Balmain Cemetery.

Illoura, Ballast Point and Yurulbin Park have superb harbour locations in the Balmain Peninsular.

== Footnotes ==
^a Census data for 2001 contains information for the suburbs of Glebe, Forest Lodge and parts of Annandale that were transferred from Leichhardt to the City of Sydney in 2003.
