= Inner West Council =

Local government area in Sydney, Australia

Coordinates: 33.892886°S 151.15376°E

- Local government area
- Location in Metropolitan Sydney

- Interactive map of Inner West Council
- Country: Australia
- State: New South Wales
- Region: Inner West
- Established: 12 May 2016
- Council seat: Ashfield, Leichhardt and Petersham

Government
  - Mayor: Darcy Byrne
  - State electorate: Balmain; Canterbury; Heffron; Newtown; Strathfield; Summer Hill
  - Federal divisions: Grayndler; Reid; Sydney

Area
  - Total: 35 km^{2} (14 sq mi)

Population
  - Total: 182,818 (2021 census)
  - Density: 5,220/km^{2} (13,530/sq mi)
- Website: www.innerwest.nsw.gov.auInner West Council
LGAs around Inner West Council
Canada Bay	Sydney Harbour	Sydney Harbour
Burwood	Inner West Council	City of Sydney
Canterbury Bankstown	Bayside	Bayside

Inner West Council is a local government area located in the Inner West region of Sydney in the state of New South Wales, Australia. The Inner West LGA makes up the eastern part of this wider region, and was formed on 12 May 2016 from the merger of the former Ashfield, Leichhardt and Marrickville councils.

The Inner West LGA covers an area of 35 square kilometres (14 sq mi) and as at the 2021 census had an estimated population of 182,818.

The Mayor of Inner West Council is Darcy Byrne, re-elected by the councillors on 8 October 2024. The most recent NSW local government election, held on 14 September 2024, resulted in a Labor majority of 8 Councillors, for the second consecutive term.

== History ==
In the early 2010s, the New South Wales Government explored merging various local government areas to create larger councils within Sydney. In 2013, the Independent Local Government Review Panel (ILGRP) initially proposed a merger of the six inner west councils - Burwood, Strathfield, Canada Bay, Ashfield, Leichhardt and Marrickville, into a single council that would govern almost all of the inner west region. Alternative mergers were also proposed, such as one between Auburn, Burwood and Canada Bay, or between Burwood, Canada Bay, Strathfield and Ashfield. The final proposal in the 2015 review of local government boundaries recommended that the Municipality of Ashfield, the Municipality of Leichhardt and the Marrickville Council merge to form a new council with an area of 35 square kilometres (14 sq mi) and support a population of approximately 186,000. On 12 May 2016, Ashfield Council, Marrickville Council and the Municipality of Leichhardt merged to form the Inner West Council.

The Inner West Council was the first local authority in Sydney to end Australia Day celebrations, from 2020.

=== Proposed de-amalgamation ===
In December 2021, a majority of voters in the Inner West LGA voted in favour of reversing the 2016 merger and separating the three pre-existing councils of Ashfield, Leichhardt and Marrickville. The final declared results were: 62% yes and 38% no.

In 2022, the council prepared a business case for de-amalgamation. In December 2022, Inner West Council prepared and submitted a final submission to the NSW Minister for Local Government.

However in March 2024, the Minister for Local Government received the NSW Local Government Boundaries Commission's report regarding the Council's business case for de-amalgamation. The report recommended that the proposed de-amalgamation of Inner West Council should not proceed, stating this would be the best outcome for residents and ratepayers of the current local government area.

== Suburbs and localities in the local government area ==
Suburbs in the Inner West Council area are:

- Annandale (shared with the City of Sydney)
- Ashfield
- Ashbury (shared with the City of Canterbury Bankstown)
- Balmain
- Balmain East
- Birchgrove
- Camperdown (shared with the City of Sydney)
- Croydon (shared with Municipality of Burwood)
- Croydon Park (shared with the City of Canterbury Bankstown and Municipality of Burwood)
- Dobroyd Point
- Dulwich Hill
- Enmore
- Haberfield
- Hurlstone Park (shared with the City of Canterbury Bankstown)
- Leichhardt
- Lewisham
- Lilyfield
- Marrickville
- Newtown (shared with the City of Sydney)
- Petersham
- Rozelle
- St Peters (shared with the City of Sydney)
- Stanmore
- Summer Hill
- Sydenham
- Tempe

== Demographics ==
At the 2021 census, there were 182,818 people in the Inner West local government area; of these 48.8 per cent were male and 51.2 per cent were female. Aboriginal and Torres Strait Islander people made up 1.2 per cent of the population; significantly below the NSW and Australian averages of 3.4 and 3.2 per cent respectively. The median age of people in Inner West Council was 38 years; same as the national median of 38 years. Children aged 0 – 14 years made up 14.6 per cent of the population and people aged 65 years and over made up 14.1 per cent of the population. Of people in the area aged 15 years and over, 37.1 per cent were married and 10.7 per cent were either divorced or separated.

At the 2021 census, the proportion of residents in the Inner West local government area who stated their ancestry as Australian or from Britain or Ireland was about 68 per cent of all residents. In excess of 49 per cent of all residents in Inner West Council nominated a no religious affiliation at the 2021 census, which was in excess of the national average of 38.4 per cent. Meanwhile, as at the census date, compared to the national average, households in the Inner West local government area had a higher than average proportion (42.9 per cent) where two or more languages are spoken (the national average was 31.8 per cent); and a lower proportion (69.8 per cent) where English only was spoken at home (national average was 72.0 per cent).

The demographics of renters leaving the council area, possibly due to the Australian rental crisis, is of interest. In 2016 there were 14,085 people aged 20-24, which dropped to 13,582 by 2024. In 2016 there were 20,091 people aged 25-29, which dropped to 19,933 by 2024.

Selected historical census data for Inner West Council local government area (Note: Inner West was known in the Census as a Statistical Area Level 4 in 2011, and known as a Statistical Subdivision in 2006 and prior.)
Census year		2021	2016	2011	2006	2001
Population	Estimated residents on census night	▲182,818	▼182,043	▲263,560	▲168,323	155,456
Population	LGA rank in terms of size within New South Wales		14th			
Population	% of New South Wales population		2.43%			
Population	% of Australian population		0.78%			
Population	Estimated ATSI population on census night	▲2,162	▲2,034	▲1,585	▼624	636
Population	% of ATSI population to residents	▲1.2%	▲1.1%	▲0.6	0.4%	0.4%
Cultural and language diversity						
Ancestry, top responses	English	▲29.9%	▲21.0%	16.6%	-	-
Ancestry, top responses	Australian	▲24.4%	▲16.7%	15.7	-	-
Ancestry, top responses	Irish	▲13.7%	▲9.8%	7.5%	-	-
Ancestry, top responses	Scottish	▲9.6%	6.5%	-	-	-
Ancestry, top responses	Chinese	▲8.5%	▼5.9%	10.3%	-	-
Language, top responses (other than English)	Mandarin	▼3.3%	▼3.6%	▼5.9%	▲6.2%	4.0%
Language, top responses (other than English)	Greek	▼2.7%	▲2.9%	2.7%	-	3.2%
Language, top responses (other than English)	Italian	▼2.2%	▼2.8%	▼5.7%	▼7.6%	9.0%
Language, top responses (other than English)	Vietnamese	2.0%	2.0%	-	-	-
Language, top responses (other than English)	Cantonese	1.9%	▼1.9%	▼4.3%	▲5.6%	5.3%
Religious affiliation						
Religious affiliation, top responses	No religion, so described	▲49.7%	▲40.4%	▲23.6%	▲15.5%	12.7%
Religious affiliation, top responses	Catholic	▼20.5%	▼22.4%	▼31.9%	▼36.2%	38.8%
Religious affiliation, top responses	Not stated	▼5.4%	10.7%	-	-	-
Religious affiliation, top responses	Anglican	▼5.8%	▼7.1%	▼9.6%	▼10.0%	12.1%
Religious affiliation, top responses	Eastern Orthodox	4.2%	▼4.2%	▼4.8%	5.0%	5.5% (Note: Eastern Orthodox was known simply as Orthodox in the 2001 Census.)
Median weekly incomes						
Personal income	Median weekly personal income	▲$1,207	▲$957	▲$723	$534	-
Personal income	% of Australian median income		144.6%			
Family income	Median weekly family income	▲$3,155	▲$2,498	▲$1,985	$1,456	-
Family income	% of Australian median income		144.1%			
Household income	Median weekly household income	▲$2,340	▲$2,048	▲$1,662	$1,191	-
Household income	% of Australian median income		142.4%			

== Council ==
The Inner West Council comprises fifteen Councillors elected proportionally, with three Councillors elected in five wards. On 9 September 2017, the previous composition of the council was elected for a fixed three-year term of office (which was extended for twelve months in 2020 to December 2021 due to the COVID-19 pandemic); the mayor is appointed biennially and deputy mayor annually by the councillors at the first meeting of the council.

=== Officeholders ===
Mayor	Term	Notes
Richard Pearson (Administrator)	12 May 2016 – 21 September 2017	
Darcy Byrne (ALP)	21 September 2017 – 7 September 2021	Mayor of Leichhardt 2012–2014, 2015–2016.
Rochelle Porteous (GRN)	7 September 2021 – 29 December 2021	Mayor of Leichhardt 2011–2012, 2014–2015.
Darcy Byrne (ALP)	29 December 2021 – present	
Deputy Mayor	Term	Notes
Julie Passas (Lib)	21 September 2017 – 11 September 2018	Ashfield East Ward Councillor 2012–2016.
Victor Macri (Ind)	11 September 2018 – 10 September 2019	Mayor of Marrickville 2012–2013.
Vittoria Raciti (Lib)	10 September 2019 – 22 September 2020	Ashfield North East Ward Councillor 2012–2016.
Victor Macri (Ind)	22 September 2020 – 7 September 2021	Marrickville Ward Councillor 2017–2021.
Pauline Lockie (Ind)	7 September 2021 – 29 December 2021	
Jessica D'Arienzo (ALP)	29 December 2021 – 13 September 2022	
Philippa Scott (ALP)	13 September 2022 – 19 September 2023	
Chloe Smith (ALP)	19 September 2023 – 2024	
Mat Howard (ALP)	8 October 2024 – 2025	
Chloe Smith (ALP)	25 September 2025 – 3 September 2026	
Philipp Scott (ALP)	3 September 2026 – present	
General Manager/CEO	Term	Notes
Vanessa Chan	12 May 2016 – 1 September 2016	General Manager of Ashfield Council 2010–2016
Rik Hart	9 September 2016 – 20 February 2019	General Manager of Warringah Council 2007–2016
Michael Deegan	20 February 2019 – 19 October 2020	
Elizabeth Richardson (acting)	19 October 2020 – 30 October 2020	
Brian Barrett (acting)	30 October 2020 – 9 April 2021	General Manager of Marrickville Council 2013–2016
Elizabeth Richardson (acting)	9 April 2021 – 3 May 2021	
Peter Gainsford	3 May 2021 – present	General Manager of the City of Canada Bay 2018–2021

=== Current composition ===
The most recent election was held on 14 September 2024, and the makeup of the council by order of election, is as follows:

Party	Councillors
Australian Labor Party	8
Greens NSW	5
Liberal Party	1
Independents	1
Total	15

Ward	Councillor	Party	Notes
Ashfield – Djarrawunang (Magpie) Ward	Izabella Antoniou	Greens	
Ashfield – Djarrawunang (Magpie) Ward	Jo Carlisle	Labor	
Ashfield – Djarrawunang (Magpie) Ward	Jessica D'Arienzo	Labor	Deputy Mayor 2021–2022.
Balmain – Baludarri (Leather Jacket) Ward	Ismet Tastan	Greens	
Balmain – Baludarri (Leather Jacket) Ward	Darcy Byrne	Labor	Elected 2017; Mayor 2017–2021, 2021–present.
Balmain – Baludarri (Leather Jacket) Ward	Kerrie Fergusson	Labor	
Leichhardt – Gulgadya (Grass Tree) Ward	Andrew Blake	Greens	
Leichhardt – Gulgadya (Grass Tree) Ward	Philippa Scott	Labor	Deputy Mayor 2022–2023, 2026–present.
Leichhardt – Gulgadya (Grass Tree) Ward	Vittoria Raciti	Liberal	
Marrickville – Midjuburi (Lillypilly) Ward	Mat Howard	Labor	Deputy Mayor 2024–2025
Marrickville – Midjuburi (Lillypilly) Ward	Olivia Barlow	Greens	
Marrickville – Midjuburi (Lillypilly) Ward	Victor Macri	Independent	
Stanmore – Damun (Port Jackson Fig) Ward	Liz Atkins	Greens	Elected 2021
Stanmore – Damun (Port Jackson Fig) Ward	Chloe Smith	Labor	Deputy Mayor 2023–2024, 2025–2026.
Stanmore – Damun (Port Jackson Fig) Ward	Vicki Clay	Labor	

=== Town halls ===
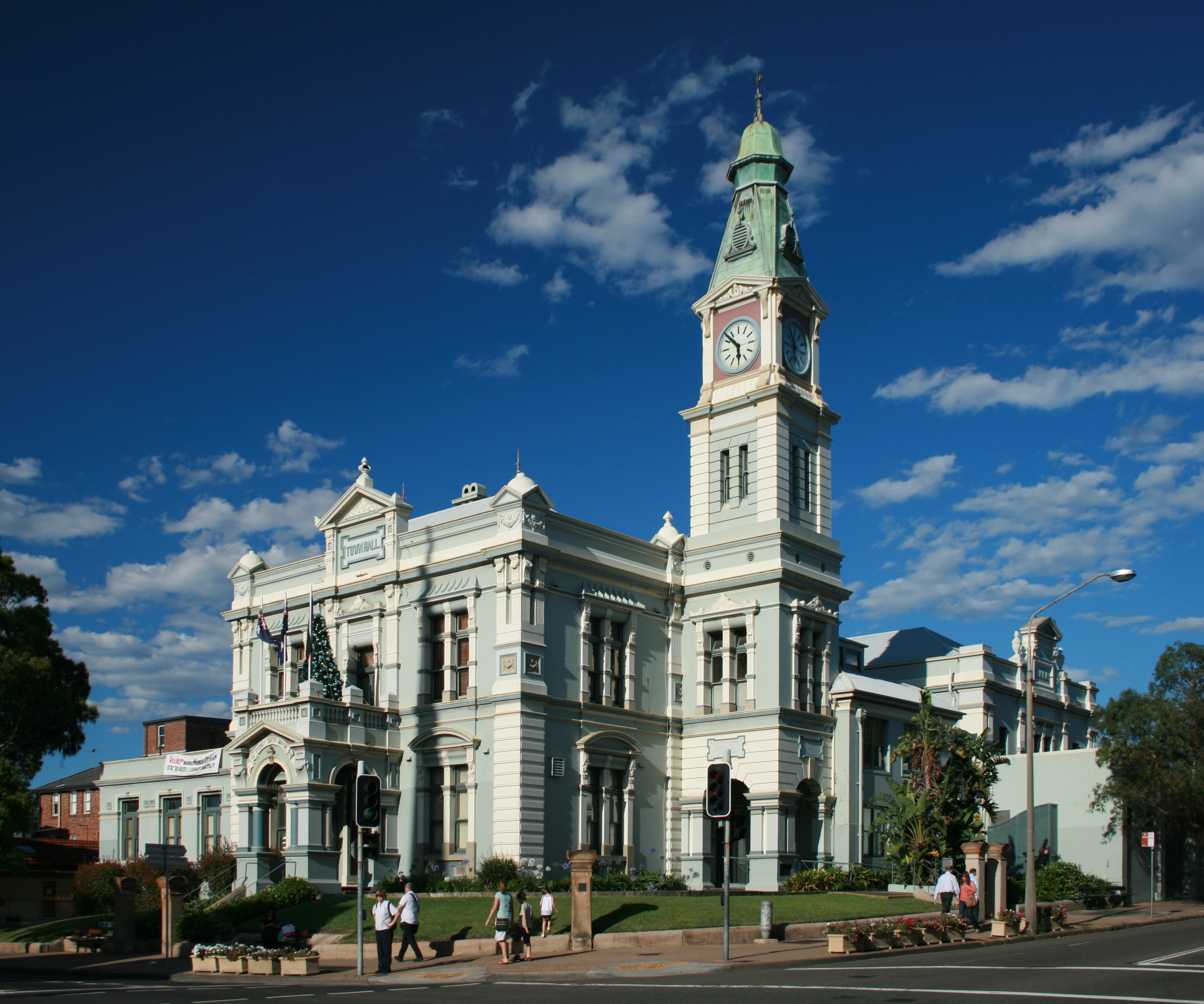
Leichhardt Town Hall, seat of the former Leichhardt council, now one of the three seats of the Inner West Council

The Inner West Council owns and maintains the three seats of the three pre-merger councils, being Ashfield Town Hall, Petersham Town Hall and Leichhardt Town Hall. Since 2021, all Council meetings have been held at the Ashfield Service Centre.

In addition, the Council also owns the Marrickville, Balmain and St Peters town halls, which were the seats of municipal councils that had existed prior to their merger into the immediate predecessor councils.

== Election results ==
=== 2024 ===
2024 New South Wales local elections: Inner West
Party	Votes	%	Swing	Seats	Change
Labor	46,210	42.54%	+3.94%	8	Steady
Greens	37,024	34.08%	−1.20%	5	Steady
Liberal	16,490	15.18%	+8.68% (Note: Compared to the Independent Liberal result in 2021.)	1	Steady
Independents	8,690	8.00%	−7.30%	1	Steady
Libertarian	212	0.20%	+0.20%	0	new
Formal votes	108,626				
Informal votes	3,432				
Total	112,058				

=== 2021 ===
The Liberal Party did not endorse any candidates, including its two councillors elected in 2017.

2021 New South Wales local elections: Inner West
Party	Votes	%	Swing	Seats	Change
Labor	40,113	38.6	+4.7	8	▲3
Greens	37,499	36.0	+7.2	5	Steady
Independent	15,967	15.3	−2.7	2	▼1
Independent Liberal	6,738	6.5	−11.1 (Note: Compared with the Liberal Party result at the 2017 election.)	0	▼2
Community Independents	1,195	1.1		0	Steady
Community Independent	898	0.9		0	Steady
Animal Justice	876	0.8	+0.8	0	Steady
Socialist Alliance	749	0.8	–0.2	0	Steady
Formal votes	104,035	96.49			
Informal votes	3,795	3.51			
Total	107,830	100.00			

== Past councillors ==
=== Ashfield–Djarrawunang Ward ===
Year	Councillor	Party	Councillor	Party	Councillor	Party
2017	Mark Drury	Labor	Tom Kiat	Greens	Julie Passas	Liberal
2021	Mark Drury	Labor	Dylan Griffiths	Greens	Jessica D'Arienzo	Labor

=== Balmain–Baludarri Ward ===
Year	Councillor	Party	Councillor	Party	Councillor	Party
2017	Darcy Byrne	Labor	Rochelle Porteous	Greens	John Stamolis	Independent
2021	Darcy Byrne	Labor	Kobi Shetty	Greens	John Stamolis	Independent

=== Leichhardt–Gulgadya Ward ===
Year	Councillor	Party	Councillor	Party	Councillor	Party
2017	Lucille McKenna	Labor	Marghanita Da Cruz	Greens	Vittoria Raciti	Liberal
2021	Philippa Scott	Labor	Marghanita Da Cruz	Greens	Tim Stephens	Labor

=== Marrickville–Midjuburi Ward ===
Year	Councillor	Party	Councillor	Party	Councillor	Party
2017	Sam Iskandar	Labor	Colin Hesse	Greens	Victor Macri	Independent
2021	Mat Howard	Labor	Justine Langford	Greens	Zoi Tsardoulias	Labor

=== Stanmore–Damun Ward ===
Year	Councillor	Party	Councillor	Party	Councillor	Party
2017	Anna York	Labor	Louise Steer	Greens	Pauline Lockie	Independent
2021	Chloe Smith	Labor	Liz Atkins	Greens	Pauline Lockie	Independent

== Inner West Library Service ==
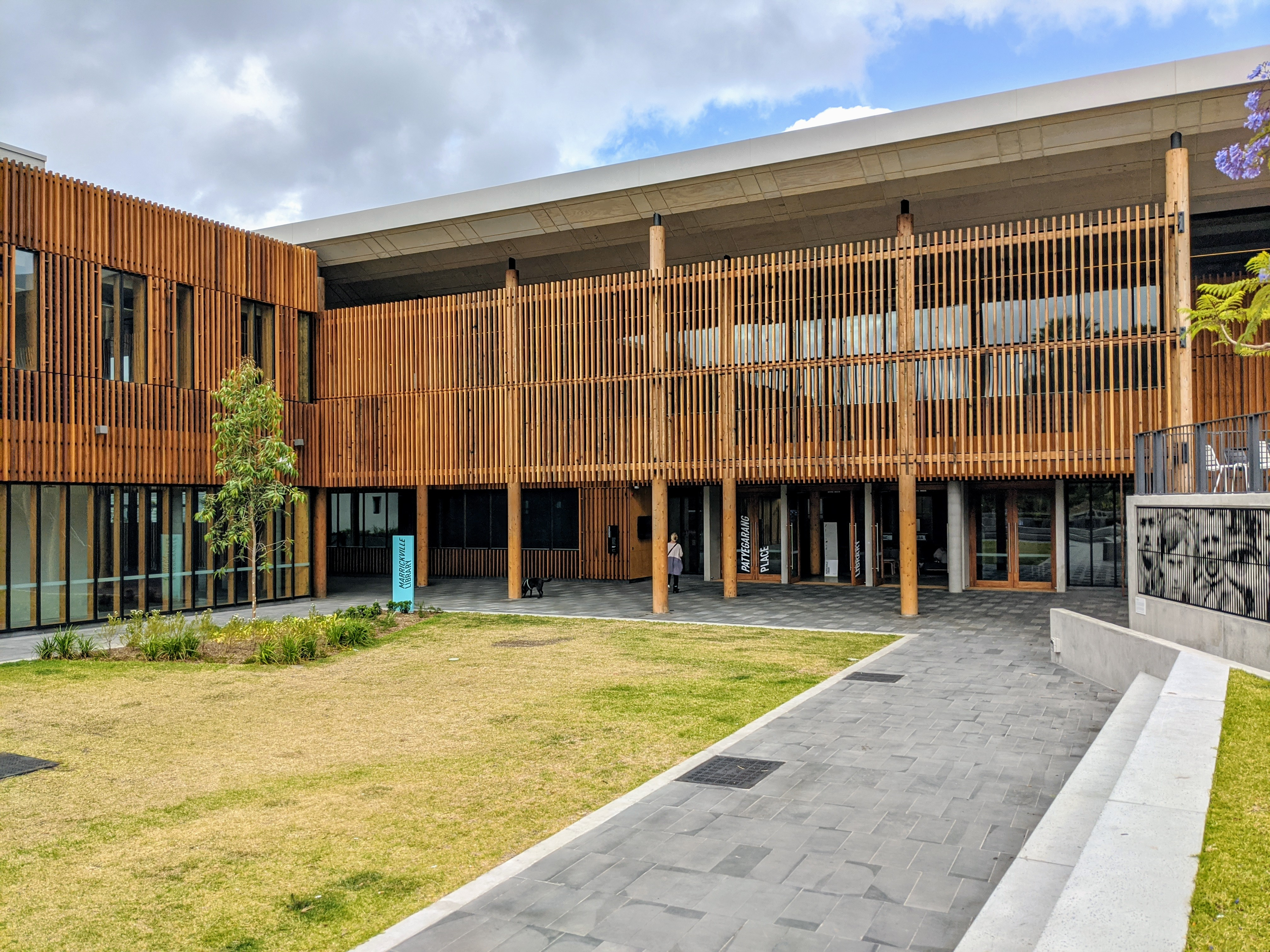
Marrickville Library

The Inner West Library Service consists of a network of 8 libraries located within the Inner West Council boundaries. After the Inner West Council amalgamation, a new library management system was launched on 1 March 2019, with a soft launch in late February allowing members to borrow from all libraries in the service.

The libraries of the Inner West Library Service include:

- Ashfield Library
- Balmain Library
- Emmanuel Tsardoulias Community Dulwich Hill Library
- Haberfield Library
- Leichhardt Library
- Marrickville Library
- Stanmore Library
- St Peters/Sydenham Library

== See also ==
- Local government areas of New South Wales
