= Woodward Commission =

The Woodward Commission may refer to:

- Aboriginal Land Rights Commission, chaired by Edward Woodward
- Royal Commission into Drug Trafficking, chaired by Philip Woodward

== See also ==
- John Woodward (lawyer), chairman of the NSW Office of The Commissioners of Inquiry for Environment and Planning
