= Northholm Grammar School =

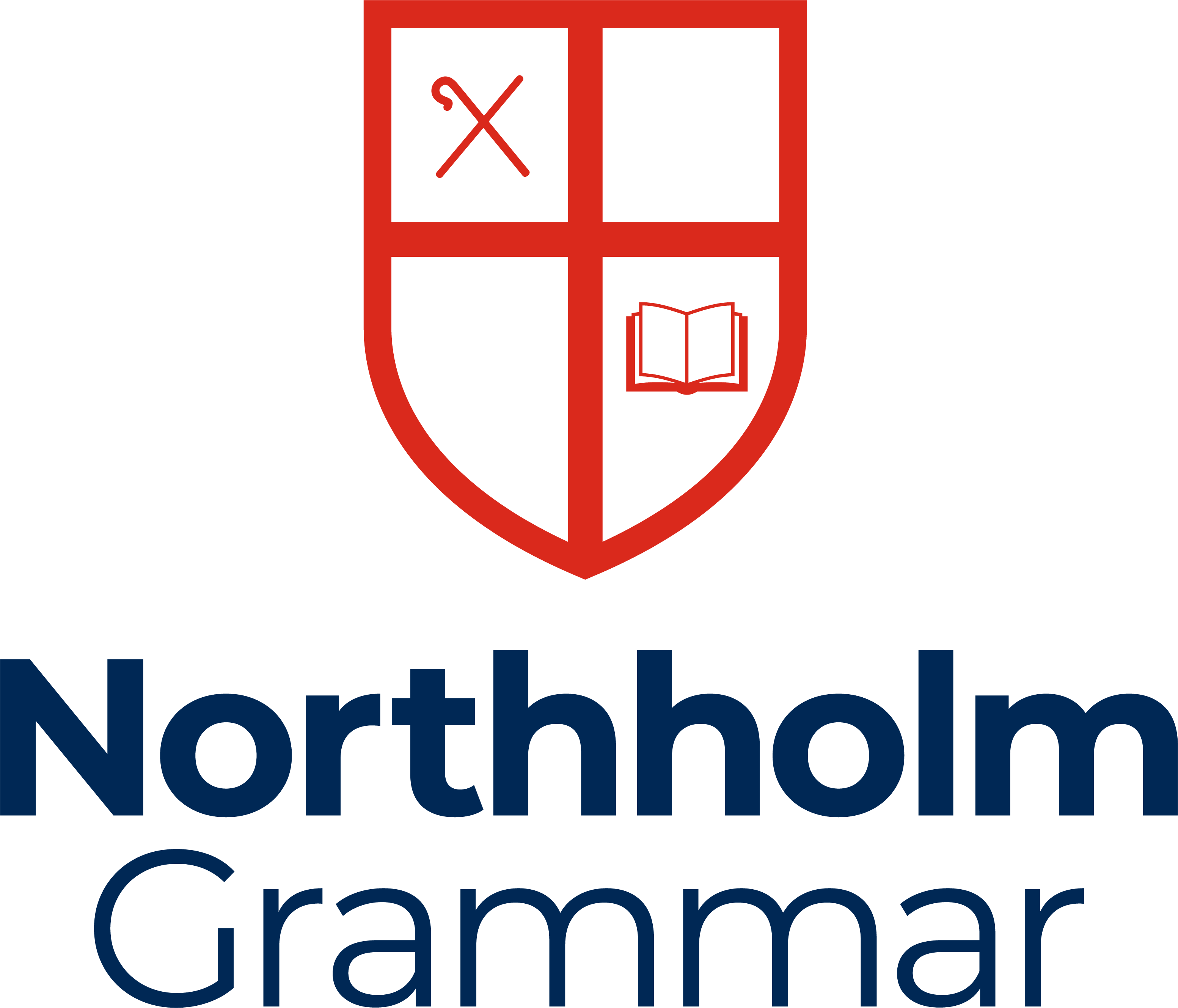

Location
- 75 Cobah Road, Arcadia, Hills District, Sydney, New South Wales; Australia; 33°36′10″S 151°03′19″E

Information
- Type: Independent co-educational primary and secondary day school
- Motto: Be Traist (Be True)
- Denomination: Anglicanism
- Established: 1983; 43 years ago
- Educational authority: New South Wales Education Standards Authority
- Principal: Nate Atkinson
- Years: K–12
- Enrolment: c. 700
- Colours: Blue, red, and white
- Website: www.northholm.nsw.edu.au

Northholm Grammar School is an independent co-educational primary and secondary day school, located in the suburb of Arcadia, in north-west Sydney.

The school was established in 1983 in the broad Anglican tradition. The school commenced with 125 students from Year 6 to Year 11, led by founding headmaster Ronald Chambers. The campus is in a semi-rural environment and situated on 10 hectares. It currently serves students from kindergarten to Year 12.

In January 2025, Nate Atkinson was commissioned as the sixth and current principal of Northholm Grammar School. In 2025, Northholm Grammar School was ranked 37^{th} in the state in the NSW Higher School Certificate rankings according to the Sydney Morning Herald.

== Education ==
Northholm Grammar is committed to a philosophy of "academic intentionality with pastoral attentiveness" within an All-Through School model. This philosophy is based around challenging students to aim for their personal best and supporting them through a personalised learning approach. The school is non-selective. It offers Academic, Music and All-Rounder Scholarships to Year 5, Year 7 and Year 11 students.

The Early Years (Kindergarten to Year 2) curriculum develops the foundations of reading, writing and mathematics, as well as specialist classes in animals and nature, creative and performing arts and sport. The Primary Years (Year 3 to Year 6) curriculum includes the core subjects of English, Mathematics, Science and Technology, and Human Society and its Environment, with specialist teachers for Sport, Art, Music, Drama and Enrichment Programs.

The Secondary Years (Years 7 to 12) curriculum emphasises the development of the whole student. In Year 7, students study English, History, Science, Geography, Mathematics, PDHPE, Creative and Performing Arts, Technology, Design and Technology, Food Technology and Faith and Life. In Year 8, they continue the same with the addition of French. From Year 9, students can choose elective subjects from a broad range of subjects within the requirements of the NSW Board of Studies that allow students to tailor their studies. Students in Years 11 and 12 work towards their Higher School Certificate, with the opportunity to study TAFE vocational courses. Alternative study options are also available.

All subjects are within the guidelines of the national curriculum, the Australian Curriculum. Personalised education plans are in place for students requiring additional support.

== Pastoral care and co-curricular ==
Since its inception in 1983, wellbeing and character development has been an integral part of Northholm's program. This includes the House System, tutor groups, leadership programs, service learning activities, spiritual growth and a bespoke Character Education program.

Co-curricular programs are available to students from Kindergarten through to Year 12 and include Creative and Performing Arts, Sport, Agriculture and Outdoor Education (including camps), Entrepreneurship, Extension and Enrichment, STEM and Oratory activities.

The school participates in the Duke of Edinburgh's International Award, the Bebras Challenge, ICAS Competitions, and other national and international programs. They are a member of and compete in competition within the Heads of Independent Co-Educational Schools (HICES), Association of Independent Co-educational Schools (AICES), NSW Combined Independent Schools (NSWCIS), NSW Primary School Sports Association (NSWPSSA) and Hills Zone Sports Association (HZSA).

== Houses ==
Upon commencement, students are assigned a House at Northholm, which they stay in throughout their time in the school. The Houses are all names for people who reflect the history and traditions of the school. In 1983 there were three Houses at Northholm, Capell, Patteson and Rowland. In 1984, Lincoln was added.

In 2024, the school undertook a review of the House Patrons and chose to rename two of the Houses. Since 2025, the four Houses are Archdale (Yellow), Lincoln (Green), Plüss (Red) and Rowland (Blue).

=== Archdale ===
Archdale is named after Miss Helen Elizabeth (Betty) Archdale. She became a founding member of the Northholm Grammar School Council in 1980 through Foundation and until her retirement from the Council in 1987.

=== Lincoln ===
In 1984, Lincoln was established as the fourth House at Northholm, named after His Honour Judge John Lincoln (1916–2011), Founding Chairman of the School Council and a Judge of the District Court. He was also Deputy Chancellor of Macquarie University, Treasurer of the New South Wales Branch of the Liberal Party, Mayor of North Sydney and Chancellor of the Diocese of Newcastle.

=== Plüss ===
Jenny Plüss is the current head of operations at Northholm Grammar and was a teacher of English, History and Mathematics at the school’s foundation in 1983. In 1984 she was appointed head of house for Capell and Year 7 coordinator. In 1995 she became the director of co-curricular activities and then director of student development in 2011. More recently, she has played a significant role in the Senior Leadership Team and is leader of Lincoln House.

=== Rowland ===
Rowland House is named after former governor of New South Wales, Air Marshal Sir James Rowland (1922–1999), who formally opened the School in July 1983. Rowland was awarded an Air Force Cross, Distinguished Flying Cross and Knight Commander of the Order of the British Empire during his service in the Royal Australian Air Force, and later appointed a Companion of the Order of Australia.

=== Capell ===
Capell House was named after Arthur Capell (1902–1986), who attended the school opening in July 1983. Capell was a renowned Australian linguist who made major contribution to the study of several Papuan, Polynesian and Indigenous Australian languages. Capell House was renamed by Plüss House in 2025.

=== Patteson ===
Patteson House was named after a John Coleridge Patteson (1827–1871), an English Anglican Bishop, missionary to the South Sea Islands, the first Bishop of Melanesia and accomplished linguist. Patteson House was renamed by Archdale House in 2025.

== Publications ==
Northholm produces several publications throughout the school year, namely The Arcadian, Learning through Scholarship, Annual Report and Ilex. The School newsletter is called The Record.

=== The Arcadian ===
The Arcadian is Northholm Grammar’s bi-yearly magazine featuring news and articles celebrating student achievements and contributions to the community from Northholm students. The Arcadian is available to read on the school website.

=== Annual Report ===
Northholm publishes their Annual Report on the website each year, prior to 30 June aligned with the NSW Education Standards Authority (NESA) requirements.

=== Learning through Scholarship ===
Learning through Scholarship includes the Higher School Certificate results from Northholm graduating students. It is issued once a year.

=== Ilex ===
Ilex is Northholm's annual school yearbook distributed at the end of each year, that features yearly reports from all departments of the school, house reports, activity summaries, co-curricular reports and photos. It is named after the holly oak (holm oak) trees which are a symbol of prosperity, strength, stability and comfort.

=== The Record ===
The Record is Northholm's bi-weekly newsletter which is emailed to parents on Fridays. It features messages from the Principal and senior leaders, notable student achievements, the results from Northholm's sporting teams and co-curricular achievements, as well as upcoming events.

== Notable alumni ==
The following is a list of Northholm alumni who have had significant success in their chosen field:

- Matt Dunning, represented Australia in rugby union
- Casey Dunning, represented Canada in rugby union
- Julia Hargreaves, represented Australia at the 2012 Summer Olympics in equestrian jumping
- Molly Taylor, professional rally driver
- Craig Lewis, represented Australia at the 2004 Summer Olympics in baseball, coming home with a silver medal
- Hannah Dodd, dual Paralympian in wheelchair basketball and equestrian

== See also ==
- List of Anglican schools in New South Wales
- Sydney Anglican Schools Corporation
