= List of mayors of Annandale =

People who served as the mayor of the Municipality of Annandale are:

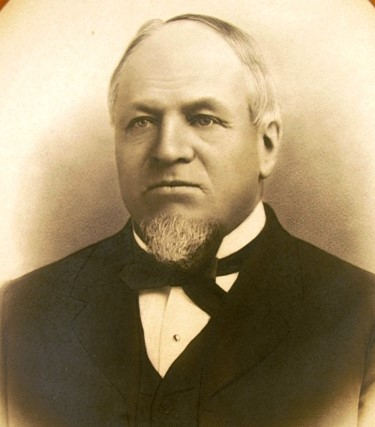
John Young (1827–1907), first Mayor (1894–1897), Mayor of Leichhardt (1879–1880, 1885–1886) and Mayor of Sydney (1885–1886)

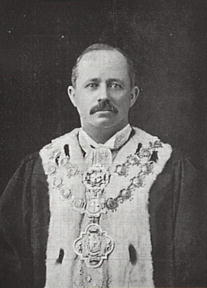
Sir Allen Taylor (1864–1940), Mayor (1897–1900, 1901–1903), Lord Mayor of Sydney (1905–1906, 1909–1912).

Years	Mayor	Notes
14 February 1894 – 10 February 1897	John Young	
10 February 1897 – 8 August 1900	Allen Taylor	
8 August 1900 – 14 February 1901	William Wells	
14 February 1901 – 12 February 1903	Allen Taylor	
12 February 1903 – 11 February 1904	William Wells	
11 February 1904 – 13 February 1907	Owen Ridge	
13 February 1907 – February 1910	William Wells	
February 1910 – 7 February 1913	James Robertson	
7 February 1913 – February 1915	Thomas Colebrook	
February 1915 – 5 February 1918	Edward Hogan	
5 February 1918 – 4 February 1919	Frederick Smith	
4 February 1919 – December 1921	Arthur Ernest Packer	
December 1921 – December 1922	Charles Schofield	
December 1922 – December 1923	Edward Hogan	
December 1923 – 11 December 1925	Walter Ridge	
11 December 1925 – December 1930	John William Sharpe	
December 1930 – 6 December 1932	Edward Hogan	
6 December 1932 – 13 July 1933	Charles Winkworth	
27 July 1933 – December 1935	Matthew Smith	
December 1935 – December 1936	George William Marshall	
December 1936 – December 1937	William Johnston	
December 1937 – December 1938	Edward Hogan	
December 1938 – 13 December 1939	Sydney Francis	
13 December 1939 – 9 December 1940	John James Field	
9 December 1940 – 15 December 1940	Percival Druitt McDonald	
December 1940 – December 1941	William Boyd	
December 1941 – 17 December 1942	Edward Hogan	
17 December 1942 – 12 December 1944	George Henry Law	
12 December 1944 – 31 December 1948	James Prendergast	
