= List of mayors of North Sydney =

Mayor of North Sydney Council
- Incumbent; Zoë Baker since 10 January 2022
- Style: His/Her Worship the Mayor Councillor
- Appointer: North Sydney Council
- Term length: One Year (1890–1982) Four years (1983–2020) Two years (2021–date)
- Formation: 8 August 1890
- First holder: Francis Punch
- Deputy: Godfrey Santor
- Salary: $30,550–71,300 (2022)
- Website: www.northsydney.nsw.gov.au

The Mayor of North Sydney is the head of North Sydney Council, which is the local government area in the lower north shore region of Sydney including North Sydney, Neutral Bay, Cremorne and Crows Nest in the State of New South Wales, Australia. From 1983 to 2017, the mayor was directly elected, replacing the previous system of being internally elected annually by the councillors, nominally serving a four-year term.

Following a referendum in 2017, the mayor is now elected for a two-year term by the elected councillors, effective from the 2021 elections, and the office is currently held by Zoë Baker. The mayor is assisted in their work by a deputy mayor, who is elected on an annual basis by the elected councillors.

== History ==
The area now covered by North Sydney Council originally comprised three municipalities: the Borough of East St Leonards from 1860 (Kirribilli, Cremorne Point, Milsons Point), the Borough of St Leonards from 1867 (Cammeray, Mosman, Waverton, Wollstonecraft) and the very small Borough of Victoria from 1871 (McMahons Point and parts of North Sydney and Lavender Bay). These boroughs lasted until 29 July 1890 when they merged to form the "Borough of North Sydney", with the last mayor of St Leonards, Francis Punch, elected as the first mayor of North Sydney. Following a petition submitted by residents in 1892, on 11 April 1893 the Mossman Ward of North Sydney confirmed its separation as the Borough of Mosman, being proclaimed by Lieutenant-Governor Sir Frederick Darley. From 28 December 1906, following the passing of the Local Government Act, 1906, the council was renamed as the "Municipality of North Sydney". With the passing of the Local Government Act, 1993, the Municipality of North Sydney became North Sydney Council and aldermen were renamed councillors.

A referendum passed at the 2017 election also altered the system of electing the mayor. Starting from 2021, the mayor was elected by the councillors for a two-year term. As the wording of this referendum did not specify a reduction in the number of elected positions in the council (such as from 10 councillors to 9), the Office of Local Government required Council to specify a ward structure of equal numbers to each ward: two wards of five councillors or five wards of two councillors. At its extraordinary meeting held on 20 January 2020, the Council voted to adopt a two-ward model on a north–south boundary with the northern ward named "St Leonards Ward" and the southern ward named "Cammeraygal Ward" from the next election. Although the fixed term of the council is four years, due to delays caused by amalgamations and the COVID-19 pandemic, the term from 9 September 2017 expired on 3 December 2021.

== Mayors ==
=== 1890−present ===
The following individuals has served as the mayor of North Sydney Council, or any predecessor titles:

No.	Portrait	Mayor	Party	Term start	Term end	Time in office
1		Francis Punch	Protectionist	8 August 1890	10 February 1892	1 year, 186 days
2		Gerard Phillips	Independent	10 February 1892	17 May 1892	97 days
3		Edward Clark	Labor	24 May 1892	12 February 1893	264 days
4		Alexander Macknight	Independent	12 February 1893	15 February 1894	1 year, 3 days
5		Gerald Joseph Barry	Independent	15 February 1894	11 February 1897	2 years, 362 days
6		John Purves	Independent	11 February 1897	10 February 1898	364 days
7		Francis Clarke	Protectionist	10 February 1898	11 February 1899	1 year, 1 day
(6)		John Purves	Independent	14 February 1899	12 February 1901	1 year, 363 days
8		Thomas Wilson Hodgson	Independent	12 February 1901	12 February 1903	2 years, 0 days
9		John Carter	Independent	12 February 1903	9 February 1909	5 years, 363 days
10		Alfred Milson^{a}	Independent	9 February 1909	6 February 1912	2 years, 362 days
11		Charles Alexander Walker^{b}	Independent	6 February 1912	3 November 1913	1 year, 270 days
(10)		Alfred Milson^{a}	Independent	11 November 1913	3 February 1914	84 days
12		William Anderson	Independent	3 February 1914	28 February 1918	4 years, 25 days
(3)		Edward Clark	Independent	1 March 1918	1 March 1919	1 year, 0 days
13		Albert Ernest Whatmore	Independent	1 March 1919	13 December 1921	2 years, 287 days
14		Henry Green	Independent	13 December 1921	12 December 1922	364 days
15		George Thomas Clarke^{c}	Independent	12 December 1922	11 December 1923	364 days
16		Charles William Watt	Independent	11 December 1923	7 December 1926	2 years, 361 days
17		Hubert Primrose	Independent	7 December 1926	25 May 1932	6 years, 13 days
(17)		Hubert Primrose	United Australia	25 May 1932	20 December 1932	6 years, 13 days
18		Raymond Lee Hodgson	Independent	20 December 1932	4 December 1934	1 year, 349 days
19		Robert Charles Forsyth	Independent	4 December 1934	3 December 1935	364 days
20		David Blair Hunter	Independent	3 December 1935	7 December 1937	2 years, 4 days
21		James Street Stanton	Independent	7 December 1937	14 December 1939	2 years, 7 days
22		John Cramer	United Australia	14 December 1939	6 December 1941	1 year, 357 days
23		George Augustus Fowle	Independent	December 1941	5 December 1945	
24		William Alan Gould Kesterton OBE	Independent	5 December 1945	December 1949	
25		Cecil Leatham Kyle OBE	Independent	December 1949	December 1950	
(23)		George Augustus Fowle	Independent	December 1950	15 December 1953	
26		William Henry Brothers	Independent	15 December 1953	December 1956	
27		John Lincoln	Liberal	December 1956	19 December 1958	
28		Joseph Vincent Bugler	Independent	19 December 1958	December 1961	
29		Leslie Nuttal Flitcroft	Independent	December 1961	1 December 1962	
30		Barton Donald Higgs	Independent	5 December 1962	1 December 1964	1 year, 362 days
31		Royce Henry Herswell Jeffrey	Independent	1 December 1964	15 July 1966	1 year, 226 days
32		Innes Stanley Haviland	Independent	26 July 1966	13 December 1968	2 years, 140 days
(28)		Joseph Vincent Bugler	Independent	13 December 1968	11 December 1969	363 days
33		Michael John Fitzpatrick	Independent	11 December 1969	23 September 1971	1 year, 286 days
34		John Woodward	Independent	23 September 1971	27 September 1972	1 year, 4 days
35		Michael O'Dea AM	Independent	27 September 1972	21 September 1974	1 year, 359 days
(32)		Innes Stanley Haviland	Independent	25 September 1974	24 September 1975	364 days
36		David Michael Wyllie	Independent	24 September 1975	22 September 1976	364 days
(33)		Michael John Fitzpatrick	Independent	22 September 1976	29 September 1977	1 year, 7 days
37		Willis Anthony Salier	Independent	29 September 1977	20 September 1978	356 days
(33)		Michael John Fitzpatrick	Independent	20 September 1978	26 September 1979	1 year, 6 days
38		Carole Baker	Independent	26 September 1979	20 September 1980	360 days
39		Ted Mack	Independent	29 September 1980	4 October 1988	8 years, 5 days
–		Neil Hartley (acting)	Independent	4 October 1988	10 December 1988	67 days
40		Roslyn Crichton	Independent	10 December 1988	14 September 1991	2 years, 278 days
41		Gerry Nolan	Independent	14 September 1991	9 September 1995	3 years, 360 days
42		Genia McCaffery	Independent	9 September 1995	8 September 2012	16 years, 365 days
43		Jilly Gibson	Team Jilly	8 September 2012	4 December 2021	9 years, 124 days
44		Zoë Baker^{d}	Real Independents	10 January 2022	incumbent	4 years, 316 days

== Deputy mayors ==
The position of deputy mayor was made a permanent council position when the Local Government Act 1919 came into effect from 1 January 1920. However, the position was optional and was not filled until August 1926, when during a period of illness of the sitting mayor, Charles Watt, the Council resolved to fill the position permanently, and a former mayor, Edward Clark, was elected as the first deputy mayor.

=== 1926−present ===
The following individuals have been elected as deputy mayor of North Sydney:

No.	Portrait	Mayor	Party	Term start	Term end	Time in office	Mayor
1		Edward Clark	Independent	17 August 1926	7 December 1926	112 days	Watt (Independent)
2		Robert Charles Forsyth	Independent	7 December 1926	20 December 1932	6 years, 13 days	Primrose (Independent/UAP)
3		Sydney Frederick Rupert Hardy	Independent	20 December 1932	5 December 1933	350 days	Hodgson (Independent)
(2)		Robert Charles Forsyth	Independent	5 December 1933	4 December 1934	364 days	Hodgson (Independent)
4		David Blair Hunter	Independent	4 December 1934	3 December 1935	364 days	Forsyth (Independent)
5		James Street Stanton	Independent	3 December 1935	7 December 1937	2 years, 4 days	Hunter (Independent)
6		John Cramer	United Australia	7 December 1937	14 December 1939	2 years, 7 days	Stanton (Independent)
7		George Augustus Fowle	Independent	14 December 1939	December 1941		Cramer (UAP)
8		William Alan Gould Kesterton	Independent	December 1941	December 1942		Fowle (Independent)
9		Kenneth McLeod Bolton	Independent	27 December 1942	5 December 1944	1 year, 344 days	Fowle (Independent)
(8)		William Alan Gould Kesterton	Independent	5 December 1944	5 December 1945	1 year, 0 days	Fowle (Independent)
10		William Henry Brothers	Independent	5 December 1945	December 1948		Kesterton (Independent)
		unknown		December 1948	December 1949		Kesterton (Independent)
		unknown		December 1949	December 1950		Kyle (Independent)
		unknown		December 1950	15 December 1953		Fowle (Independent)
		Barton Donald Higgs	Independent	15 December 1953	December 1954		Brothers (Independent)
		unknown		December 1954	December 1956		Brothers (Independent)
		unknown		December 1956	19 December 1958		Lincoln (Liberal)
		Matthew Goodman	Independent	19 December 1958	December 1959		Bugler (Independent)
		Joseph Aloysius Hazell	Independent	15 December 1959	December 1960		Bugler (Independent)
		unknown		December 1960	December 1961		Bugler (Independent)
		unknown		December 1961	1 December 1962		Flitcroft (Independent)
		William Edward Churchill	Independent	5 December 1962	1 December 1964	3 years, 6 days	Higgs (Independent)
		William Edward Churchill	Independent	1 December 1964	10 December 1965	3 years, 6 days	Jeffrey (Independent)
		Allan John Mitchell	Independent	10 December 1965	26 July 1966	1 year, 3 days	Jeffrey (Independent)
		Allan John Mitchell	Independent	26 July 1966	13 December 1966	1 year, 3 days	Haviland (Independent)
		Frederick James Brunton	Independent	13 December 1966	13 December 1968	2 years, 0 days	Haviland (Independent)
		John Woodward	Independent	13 December 1968	11 December 1969	1 year, 363 days	Bugler (Independent)
		John Woodward	Independent	11 December 1969	11 December 1970	1 year, 363 days	Fitzpatrick (Independent)
		Helen Gordon Cook	Independent	11 December 1970	23 September 1971	286 days	Fitzpatrick (Independent)
		Peter Ronald Tranter	Independent	23 September 1971	27 September 1972	1 year, 361 days	Woodward (Independent)
		Peter Ronald Tranter	Independent	27 September 1972	19 September 1973	1 year, 361 days	O'Dea (Independent)
		David Michael Wyllie	Independent	19 September 1973	25 September 1974	1 year, 6 days	O'Dea (Independent)
		Robyn Read	Independent	25 September 1974	September 1975	1 year, 363 days	Haviland (Independent)
		Robyn Read	Independent	September 1975	22 September 1976	1 year, 363 days	Wyllie (Independent)
		Carole Anne Baker	Independent	22 September 1976	29 September 1977	1 year, 7 days	Fitzpatrick (Independent)
		David Michael Wyllie	Independent	29 September 1977	20 September 1978	356 days	Salier (Independent)
		Henry William Wirth	Independent	20 September 1978	26 September 1979	1 year, 6 days	Fitzpatick (Independent)
		David Michael Wyllie	Independent	26 September 1979	29 September 1980	360 days	Baker (Independent)
		Peter Tranter	Independent	29 September 1980	September 1983		Mack (Independent)
		Neil Hartley	Independent	September 1983	September 1984		Mack (Independent)
		Mark Singer	Independent	September 1984	September 1985		Mack (Independent)
		Neil Hartley	Independent	September 1985	10 December 1988		Mack (Independent)
		Neil Hartley	Independent	10 December 1988	September 1991		Crichton (Independent)
		Shirley Ann Colless	Independent	September 1991	September 1992		Nolan (Independent)
		Sybil Kesteven	Independent	September 1992	September 1995		Nolan (Independent)
		Christopher Ringstad	Independent	September 1995	September 1997		McCaffery (Independent)
		Penny Scardifield	Independent	September 1997	27 March 2004		McCaffery (Independent)
		Craig Carland	Independent	19 April 2004	25 September 2006	2 years, 159 days	McCaffery (Independent)
		Evan Predavec	Independent	25 September 2006	10 September 2007	350 days	McCaffery (Independent)
		Michel Reymond	Independent	10 September 2007	21 September 2009	2 years, 11 days	McCaffery (Independent)
		Andrew Robjohns	Independent	21 September 2009	13 September 2010	357 days	McCaffery (Independent)
		Michel Reymond	Independent	13 September 2010	12 September 2011	364 days	McCaffery (Independent)
		Zoë Baker^{d}	Independent	12 September 2011	24 September 2012	1 year, 12 days	McCaffery (Independent)
		Sarah Burke	Independent	24 September 2012	16 September 2013	357 days	Gibson (Team Jilly)
		Stephen Barbour	Independent	16 September 2013	15 September 2014	364 days	Gibson (Team Jilly)
		Maryann Beregi	Independent	15 September 2014	21 September 2015	1 year, 6 days	Gibson (Team Jilly)
		Jeff Morris	Independent	21 September 2015	19 September 2016	364 days	Gibson (Team Jilly)
		Melissa Clare	Independent	19 September 2016	9 September 2017	355 days	Gibson (Team Jilly)
		Stephen Barbour	CommUnity 1st	9 October 2017	3 September 2021	3 years, 329 days	Gibson (Team Jilly)
		Kathy Brodie	Team Jilly	3 September 2021	4 December 2021	92 days	Gibson (Team Jilly)
		William Bourke	Sustainable Australia	10 January 2022	26 September 2022	259 days	Baker (Real Independents)
		Godfrey Santer	Labor	26 September 2022	25 September 2023	364 days	Baker (Real Independents)
		William Bourke	Sustainable Australia	25 September 2023	14 September 2024	355 days	Baker (Real Independents)
		Godfrey Santer	Labor	8 October 2024	incumbent	2 years, 45 days	Baker (Real Independents)

== Electoral results ==
=== 2017 ===
2017 New South Wales mayoral elections: North Sydney
Party	Candidate	Votes	%	±%
Independent	Jilly Gibson	13,791	42.0	+1.5
Independent	Zoë Baker	9,856	30.0	−3.1
Independent	Jessica Keen	6,510	19.8	+19.8
Liberal Democrats	Michael Kong	2,655	8.1	+8.1
Total formal votes		32,812	95.4	
Informal votes			4.6	
Turnout			72.6	
Two-candidate-preferred result
Independent	Jilly Gibson	14,828	56.4	−0.4
Independent	Zoë Baker	11,441	43.6	+0.4
Independent hold		Swing	−0.4	

=== 2012 ===
2012 New South Wales mayoral elections: North Sydney
Party	Candidate	Votes	%	±%
Independent	Jilly Gibson	11,893	40.5	
Independent	Zoë Baker	9,731	33.1	
Independent	Suzanne Clarke-Nash	7,745	26.4	
Total formal votes		29,369	93.5	
Informal votes		2,040	6.5	
Turnout		31,409	74.1	
Two-candidate-preferred result
Independent	Jilly Gibson	14,559	56.8	
Independent	Zoë Baker	11,062	43.2	
Independent gain from Independent		Swing	N/A	

== Notes ==
^a: Grandson of James Milson (1783–1872).
^b: Son of William Walker (1828–1908), brother of Bruce Walker Sr (1870–1932) and uncle of Bruce Walker Jr (1897–1981).
^c: Lord Mayor of Sydney, 1912.
^d: Daughter of Carole Baker, Mayor (1979–1980).

== See also ==
- Borough of St Leonards
- Borough of East St Leonards
- Borough of Victoria
