= Joseph Vincent Bugler =

Australian printer and politician

Joseph Bugler OBE

28th Mayor of North Sydney
- In office 19 December 1958 – 12 December 1961
- Deputy: Matthew Goodman; Joseph Hazell; Matthew Goodman
- Preceded by: John Lincoln
- Succeeded by: Leslie Nuttal Flitcroft
- In office 13 December 1968 – 11 December 1969
- Deputy: John Woodward
- Preceded by: Innes Stanley Haviland
- Succeeded by: Michael Fitzpatrick

16th Deputy Mayor of North Sydney
- In office 17 December 1957 – 19 December 1958
- Mayor: John Lincoln
- Preceded by: Eric Joseph Drew
- Succeeded by: Matthew Goodman

Alderman of the Municipality of North Sydney for Victoria Ward
- In office 2 December 1950 – 18 September 1971

35th Mayor of Newtown
- In office 11 December 1930 – 2 January 1932
- Deputy: Edward Boland
- Preceded by: Reuben Sydney Goddard
- Succeeded by: Frederick Benedict Roberts

Alderman of the Municipality of Newtown for Enmore Ward
- In office 1 December 1928 – 1 December 1934
- In office 31 October 1942 – 31 December 1948
- Preceded by: James Lynch

Personal details
- Born: 1898 Ashfield, Colony of New South Wales
- Died: 3 August 1994 (age 96) Mosman, New South Wales, Australia
- Resting place: Rookwood Cemetery
- Party: Labor (to 1934); Federal Labor Party (1934–37); Lang Labor (1948–1950)
- Other political affiliations: Independent (1937–1948; 1950–1971)
- Spouse: Marie Josephine Cruickshank (m.1938–1994)

Joseph Vincent Bugler OBE (1898 – 3 August 1994) was an Australian printer and local government politician who served as an alderman and mayor of the Municipality of North Sydney and the Municipality of Newtown.

== Early life and career ==
Bugler was born in 1898 in Ashfield in the Colony of New South Wales, the only son of Jane Ryan and Thomas Bugler of Stanmore, who was originally from Galway, Ireland. He received his early education at Christian Brothers' High School, Lewisham. While resident at 131 Enmore Road, Bugler established a printing business in Newtown. In September 1924, Bugler was fined £20 for being in breach of the Printing Act by not printing his name and address on sweep tickets, and £20 for running an unregistered printing press at 95 Enmore Road and 1 Trafalgar Street, Newtown.

On 12 February 1938, Bugler married Marie Josephine Cruickshank.

== Political career ==
Bugler first stood successfully for election as a Labor Party alderman of the Enmore Ward of the Municipality of Newtown at the 1 December 1928 municipal elections. On 10 December 1929 he was elected as Deputy Mayor. On 11 December 1930, he was elected by the dominant Labor caucus as Mayor of Newtown, becoming one of the youngest mayors in Australia at the time. Serving as mayor at the height of the Great Depression, Bugler was involved in various relief efforts to help the less fortunate in Newtown.

Bugler stood again for re-election at the following municipal election held on 2 January 1932, but was initially unsuccessful having been placed third on the Labor ticket in Enmore Ward, and was defeated by his Deputy Mayor Edward Boland by a margin of 3 votes. However, given the minuscule margin, Bugler requested a recount under the Local Government Act, which was granted and returned a result by which he was successful in the election by a margin of 8 votes over Boland. In July 1933, Bugler gained attention for his unsuccessful attempt to have Newtown Council adopt the use of Advance Australia Fair, to replace the then national anthem, God Save the King, at all official functions. A further motion on this subject from Bugler in September 1934 was also defeated.

On 5 December 1933, he was re-elected to another term as Deputy Mayor. However, at the Labor Party ballot for candidates prior to the December 1934 municipal election, Bugler was defeated in fourth place. Bugler subsequently ran as an Independent, but was nevertheless defeated at the municipal election held on 1 December 1934.

Denied a position by the NSW Branch of the Labor Party, which had been estranged from the Federal Branch since 1931, Bugler joined the Federal Labor Party, and stood as the Federal Labor candidate for the New South Wales Legislative Assembly seat of Newtown at the 1935 state election, but was unsuccessful on a margin of 67-32%. At the 1937 and 1941 municipal elections Bugler stood as an independent for Enmore Ward on Newtown Council, but was again unsuccessful.

Bugler was eventually successful in being returned as an Independent Alderman to Newtown Council at by-election on 31 October 1942 for Enmore Ward caused by the death of Alderman James Lynch. He was re-elected at the December 1944 election. At the December 1945 mayoral election, Bugler narrowly lost the mayoralty in a tied 6–6 vote after the Labor candidate drew his name out of a hat. He again lost the mayoralty on a hat draw to the Labor candidate in December 1947 and July 1948.

With the amalgamation of Newtown Council into the City of Sydney to take effect from 1 January 1949, Bugler joined Lillian Fowler and her Lang Labor ticket for the new Newtown Ward of the City Council at the December 1948 election, but was again unsuccessful.

=== North Sydney Council ===
Having moved to the north shore suburb of Mosman, Bugler stood for and was elected as an independent alderman for Victoria Ward of the Municipality of North Sydney at the December 1950 election. He was re-elected in 1953 and 1956. In December 1957, he was elected as Deputy Mayor. In December 1958 he was elected mayor, and was elected for a further two terms in December 1959 and December 1960 to December 1961. Bugler was re-elected as a Victoria Ward alderman in 1959, 1962, 1965 and 1968.

Following his final election as an alderman in December 1968, Bugler was elected for a final term as mayor to December 1969. Bugler retired from North Sydney Council when he did not contest the December 1971 election. North Sydney Council subsequently dedicated a sportsfield in Waverton as the "Joseph Bugler Playing Field".

== Later life ==
In the 1973 New Year Honours, Bugler was made an Officer of the Order of the British Empire (OBE) for "service to the community". Bugler died at his Mosman home at the age of 96 on 3 August 1994, survived by his wife Marie, four daughters and a son.

Civic offices
Vacant	Deputy Mayor of Newtown; 1929–1930	Succeeded by Edward Boland
Preceded by Reuben Sydney Goddard	Mayor of Newtown; 1930–1932	Succeeded by Frederick Benedict Roberts
Preceded by Isidore Edwin Ryan	Deputy Mayor of Newtown; 1933–1934	Succeeded by Thomas Sheehan
Preceded by Eric Joseph Drew	Deputy Mayor of North Sydney; 1957–1958	Succeeded by Matthew Goodman
Preceded by John Lincoln	Mayor of North Sydney; 1958–1961	Succeeded by Leslie Nuttal Flitcroft
Preceded by Innes Stanley Haviland	Mayor of North Sydney; 1968–1969	Succeeded by Michael Fitzpatrick
