= Mondeval, Leura =

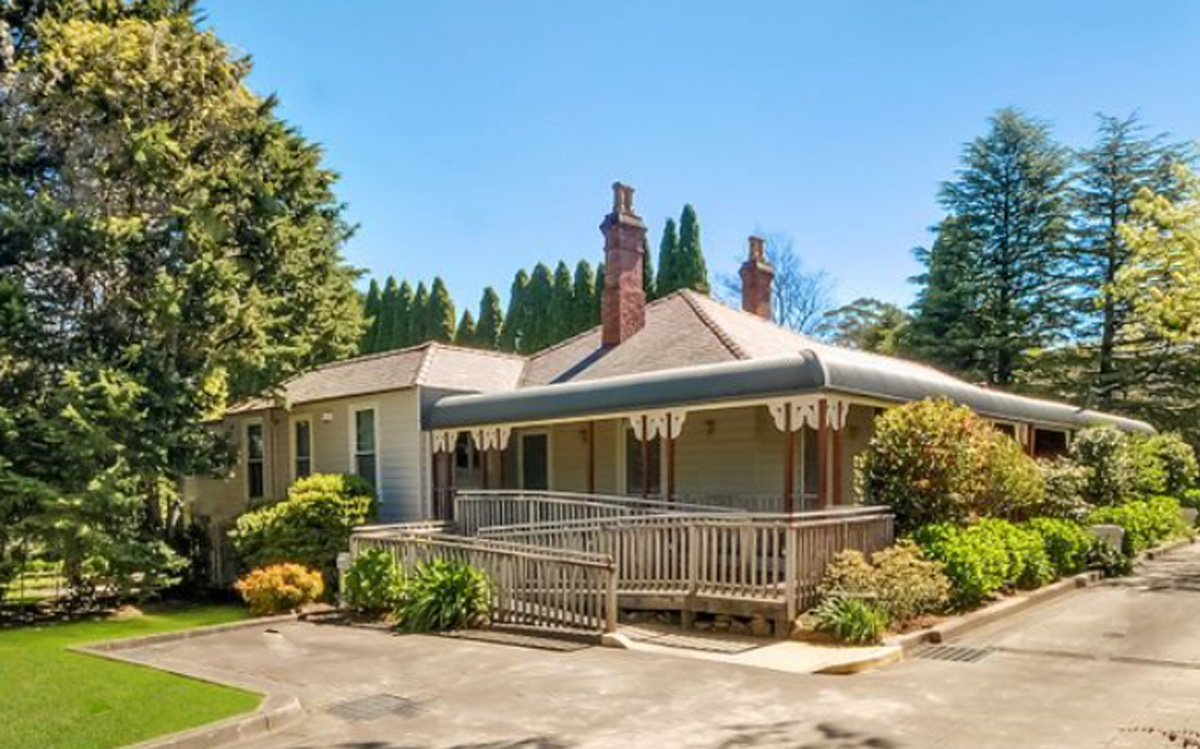
Mondeval, Leura

Mondeval in Railway Parade, Leura is a house of historical significance and is listed on the NSW Heritage list. It was built in about 1890 and is a rare example of a Victorian Regency house with high quality finishes. It was one of the first houses built in Leura and was the residence of several notable people over the next century. Today it is the head office of the Cancer Wellness Support Organisation.

== Early history ==
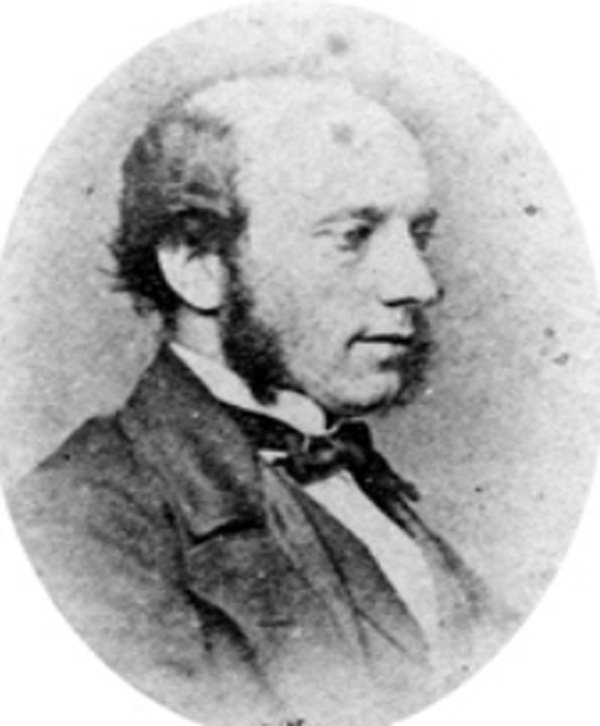
Samuel Lyons

The land on which Mondeval was built was advertised for sale by William Eyre in the Leura Estate in about 1890. He was an estate agent who owned a large number of blocks in Leura. It is possible that the originator of Mondeval was William Wallace (1817-1893) who was a wealthy Scottish builder and contractor. He lived in a house called Fernbank in Petersham. He and his wife Helen who died in 1890 had no children but they had several nieces who regarded them as parental figures. However he was 75 in 1890 and died in 1893. Perhaps the most likely person to build the house was Samuel Lyons as he is shown in the 1901 NSW Census as living in a house on Railway Parade, Leura.

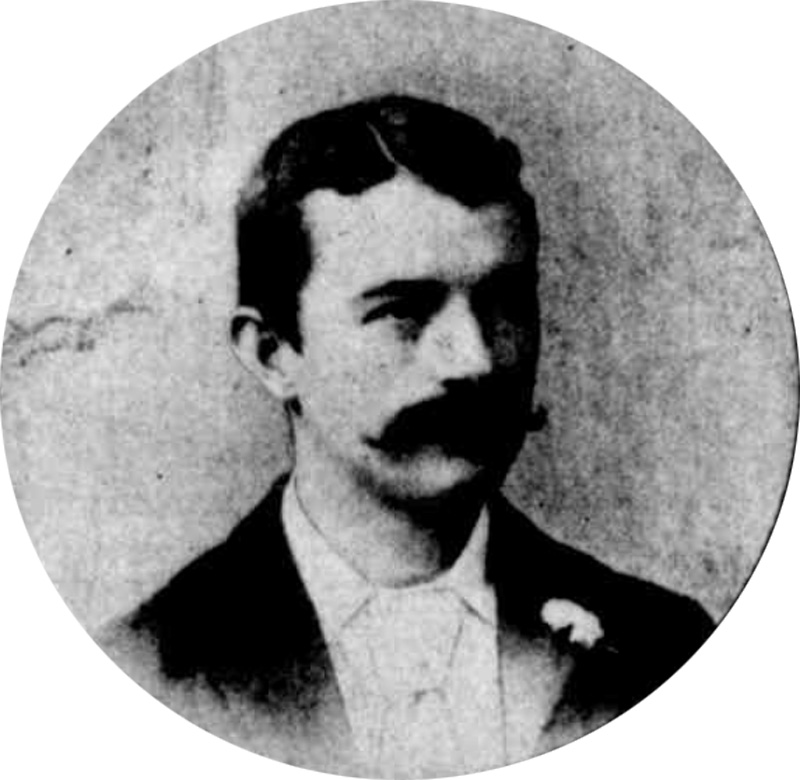
Alfred Tillotson Jones

Samuel Lyons (1826-1910) was a Member of the NSW Parliament. He was born in 1826 and at an early age was sent to England to be educated. He went to the University of Cambridge and later returned to Australia and took over the family business. In 1853 he married Charlotte Margaret Futter and the couple had three sons and two daughters. His wife died in 1868 at the age of only 35 and he was a widower for the rest of his life. In the 1890s he retired to Leura and seems to have lived in his own house for many years and then towards the end of his life moved to his daughter’s house which was just around the corner in Hartley Esplanade called “The Hermitage”. His daughter was Carlotta Lackey who had married John George Lackey in 1875. He died in 1910 at the age of 84.

In 1907 Alfred Tillotson Durston Jones (1861-1928) bought the house and called it “Kenalbremar”. He was a partner in the family company of T. T. Jones and Sons who were watchmakers and jewellers in George Street Sydney. Alfred was born in 1861 in Sydney. His father was Timothy Tillotson Jones a goldsmith and jeweller who immigrated to Australia in the 1850s and established the family business in Sydney. In 1892 Alfred married Jessie Clissold the daughter of Frederick Clissold who is credited with the original development of Leura and of giving it its name. The couple had four children. In 1910 the Jones family sold Mondeval to the Taylors and they moved to another house in Railway Parade called Ilion.

== Later history ==
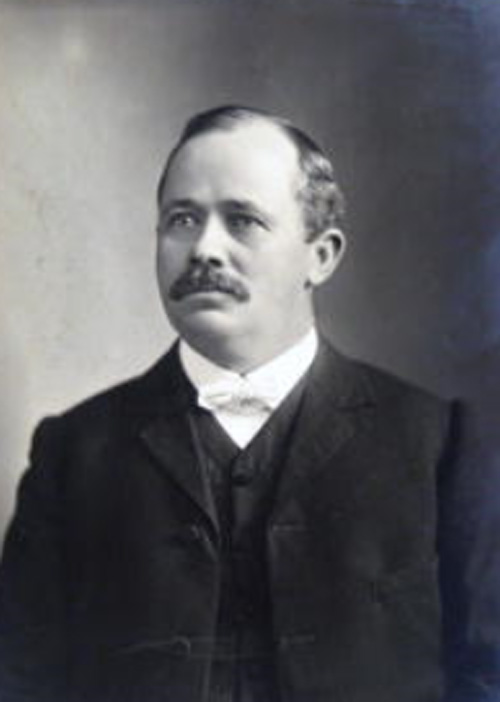
Sir Allen Arthur Taylor

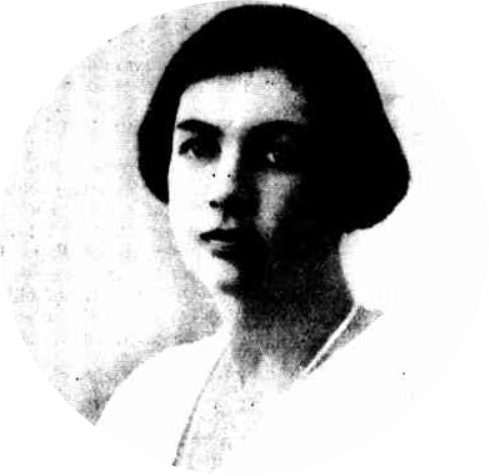
Linda Sparke Davies

Sir Allen Arthur Taylor (1864-1940) who bought Mondeval in 1910 changed the name of the house to Quipolli. He was a ship owner, member of Parliament and for many years the Mayor of Sydney. In 1886 he married Adela Mary Elliott and the couple had one child named Forster Taylor. They also had a house called Wootton in Darlinghurst. The family used Mondeval as a holiday property and had many happy gatherings for the first few years. However they decided to return to the city by 1915 and the house was sold to the Davies family who lived there for about then years.

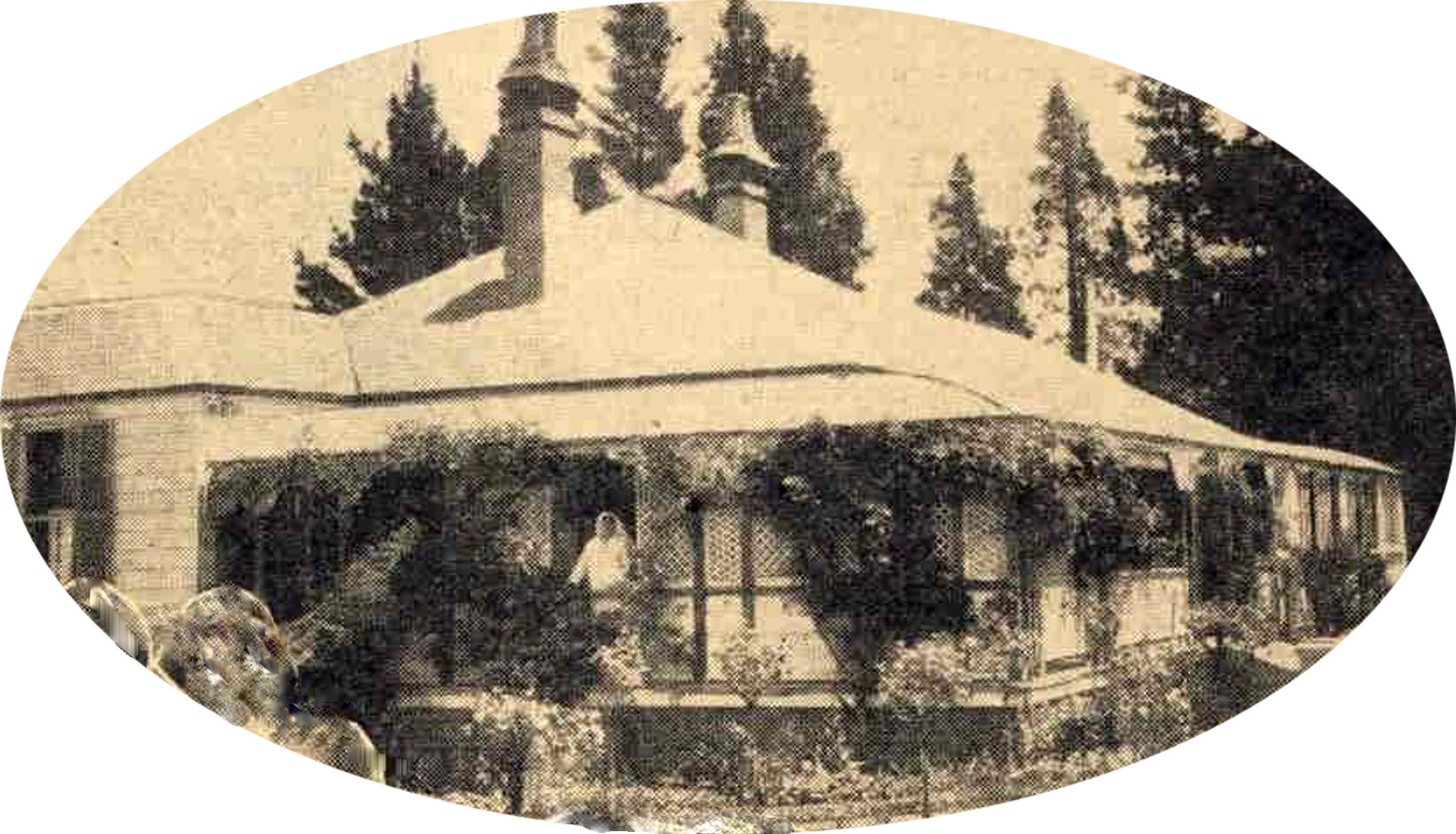
Mondevel in 1933 when it was a Girls Home

Lewis James Davies (1862-1936) was a partner in the firm Davies and Fehon who imported cars. He was very wealthy and it was mentioned in the newspaper that “all that money could buy went to beautify the house.” He was born in 1862 in Liverpool, England. His father Lewis Davies (1833-1920) was a wealthy shipowner. In 1906 he married Linda Sparke (1885-1971) who was the daughter of Edward Joseph Sparke. The couple had three children and for many years they enjoyed holidays in their mountain home. In 1924 they decided to live solely in Sydney and they generously gave the property to the Anglican Church who used the house as a home for orphaned and homeless girls. The Quipolli Girls Home operated from 1924 until 1936. The first Maton was Miss Amy Adeline Mann (1862-1929). She ran the home with Violet Eileen Clinch (1885-1967) who was the Sister at the time. When Amy left several years later Violet took over as Matron until its closure in 1936. In 1940, Edith Hurlow Jones purchased the house, renamed it “Chequers” and converted it into flats.

Edith was the first woman councillor at Katoomba and lived in Leura until about 1950. The property sold in 1950 and continued to be used as flats until 1971. During the seventies it was converted again to a single residence. In the 1980s it became a gallery and residence and was renamed 'Mondeval'.
