= Annandale Council Chambers =

Coordinates: 33.8828°S 151.1704°E

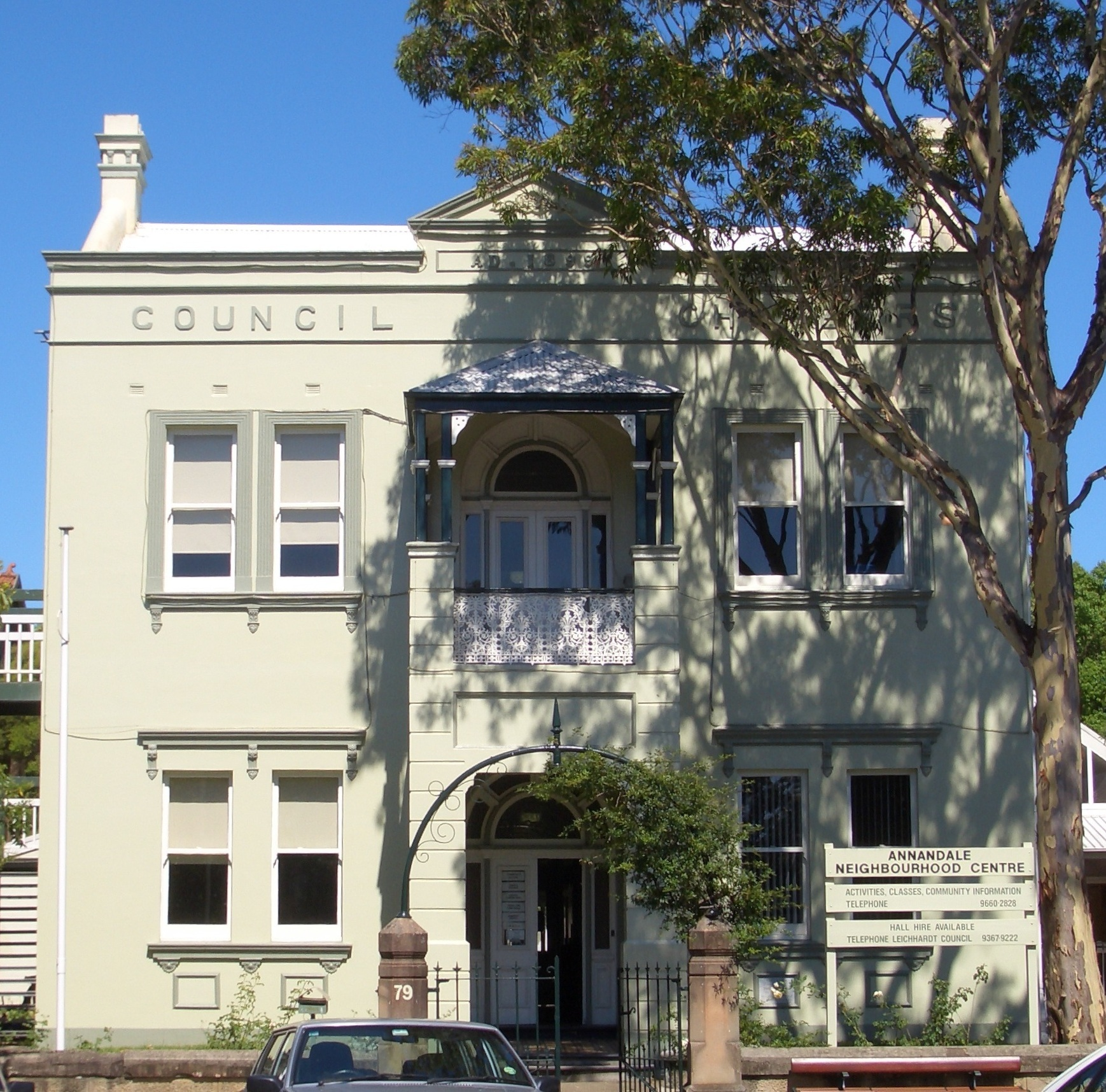
- Interactive map of the Annandale Council Chambers area
- Alternative names: Annandale Community Centre

General information
- Type: Government town hall
- Architectural style: Victorian Free Classical style.
- Location: 79 Johnston Street, Annandale, New South Wales, Australia
- Construction started: 27 May 1899
- Completed: 21 September 1899
- Client: Annandale Municipal Council
- Owner: Inner West Council (current)

Design and construction
- Architect: J. W. Richards
- Main contractor: Robert Mercer

The former Annandale Council Chambers is a landmark civic building in Annandale, a suburb of Sydney, Australia. It stands at 79 Johnston Street and was built in 1899 in the Victorian style by architect J. W. Richards. The council chambers was the seat of Annandale Municipal Council from 1899 to 1948 when it became a Leichhardt Council depot and since 1980 has been the Annandale Community Centre run by the Inner West Council. It is currently listed on the Leichhardt Local Environmental Plan.

== History and description ==
When the Borough of Annandale separated from the Municipality of Leichhardt in 1894, the council first met in the Methodist School Hall in Trafalgar street but later leased provisional quarters from September 1894 which were "somewhat inconvenient premises in Johnston street, which were originally intended as dwelling rooms, over a shop." However a need for a dedicated council chambers and hall was clearly identified, particularly by Mayor Allen Taylor, and by December 1898, the council had two sites to choose from for a new council chamber: a site on Booth Street next to the Annandale Post Office or a site further up Johnston Street.

The site on Johnston Street was eventually chosen by municipal plebiscite for a simple Victorian Free Classical design by architect, J. W. Richards, of Pitt Street, Sydney, and the foundation stone was laid in a ceremony by the Mayoress, Adela Taylor, on 27 May 1899. During the ceremony, mayor Allen Taylor noted that he was "glad they were not going to erect a palatial structure that would plunge the borough into debt that they might not be able to extricate themselves from" but added that later additions could be made to the structure such as a "town hall, where demonstrations of a political and social character might adequately take place." By September of that year, the Council Chambers had been completed at a cost of £1528 and was officially opened on 21 September 1899 by Mayor Taylor in the presence of the Member for Annandale, William Mahony. At the opening the Evening News described the building thus:

"The building stands some distance back from the footpath, leaving sufficient space for the addition of a massive front, and at the rear ample provision has been made for the erection of a large hall at any future time. The ground floor consists of a library, council clerk's office, Mayor's room, ladies' room and lavatories for ladies and gentlemen. On the first floor is the aldermanic meeting chamber, an imposing room, with an open timber roof, and anterooms for the use of the aldermen."

=== Later history ===
The chambers continued to serve as the administrative centre of Annandale until 1948, when the Annandale Municipality was re-amalgamated into Leichhardt through the Local Government (Areas) Act 1948. Leichhardt Council retained the site as a depot and truck repository, but by the late 1970s moves were made for the building to be made available as a community centre, which was officially opened on 15 March 1980. In 1983, a bomb shelter built by National Emergency Services during the Second World War in the yard of the building was demolished to allow the construction of a new hall behind the existing former council chambers building, which was opened in May 1985.

== See also ==
- List of town halls in Sydney
- List of city and town halls
- Architecture of Sydney
