= John Young (building contractor) =

Australian building contractor and politician (1827–1907)

John Young JP
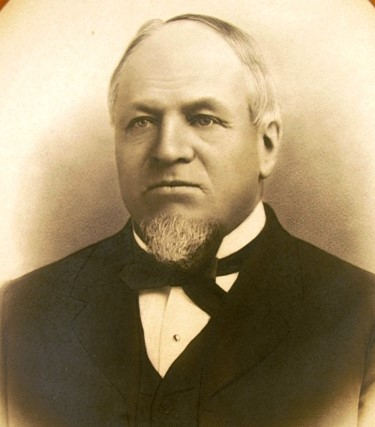

33rd Mayor of Sydney
- In office 9 December 1885 – 9 December 1886
- Preceded by: Thomas Playfair
- Succeeded by: Alban Joseph Riley

1st Mayor of Annandale
- In office 14 February 1894 – 10 February 1897
- Succeeded by: Allen Taylor

Personal details
- Born: 1827 Foot's Cray, Kent, England
- Died: 27 February 1907 (aged 79–80) Annandale, New South Wales, Australia

John Young (1827 – 27 February 1907) was an Australian bowler, builder, politician and alderman.

== Life and career ==
Young was born in Foot's Cray, Kent, England and died in Annandale, Sydney, New South Wales. After moving to Victoria, Australia, in 1855, he had mixed results as a builder. He then moved to Sydney in 1866 and proceeded to make his mark. As a result, he is especially remembered as the builder of St Mary's Cathedral in Sydney (designed by William Wardell), and the Johnston Street group of houses in Annandale. The most outstanding house in the group was The Abbey, a sandstone, heritage-listed house in the Victorian Free Gothic style. (Sydney folklore has it that Young took gargoyles intended for St Mary's Cathedral and used them on The Abbey). Another outstanding house was Highroyd. The house known as Oybin is also heritage-listed.

The Johnston Street group originally consisted of eight houses, two of which (Rozelle and Claremont) have since been demolished and replaced with blocks of home units. Young himself lived in the nearby house known as Kentville, which has also been demolished.

Young also took an active interest in politics, unsuccessfully standing for a seat in the Legislative Assembly on five occasions, 1873 (Glebe), 1874 (East Sydney), 1880 (Newtown), 1887 (Hartley), and 1894 (Annandale). He was mayor of Leichhardt in 1879 and 1884–85, mayor of Sydney in 1885–86, and mayor of Annandale in 1894–97.

Young died of cancer at Kentville in 1907.

John Young Crescent in the Canberra suburb of Greenway is named in his honour.

Civic offices
Preceded by John Thomas Fraser	Mayor of Leichhardt; 1879 – 1880	Succeeded by John Thomas Fraser
Preceded by William Pritchard	Mayor of Leichhardt; 1885 – 1886	Succeeded by Samuel George Davison
Preceded by Thomas Playfair	Mayor of Sydney; 1885 – 1886	Succeeded by Alban Joseph Riley
New title	Mayor of Annandale; 1894 – 1897	Succeeded by Allen Taylor
