= Matt Dunning =

Australian rugby union footballer and coach (born 1978)

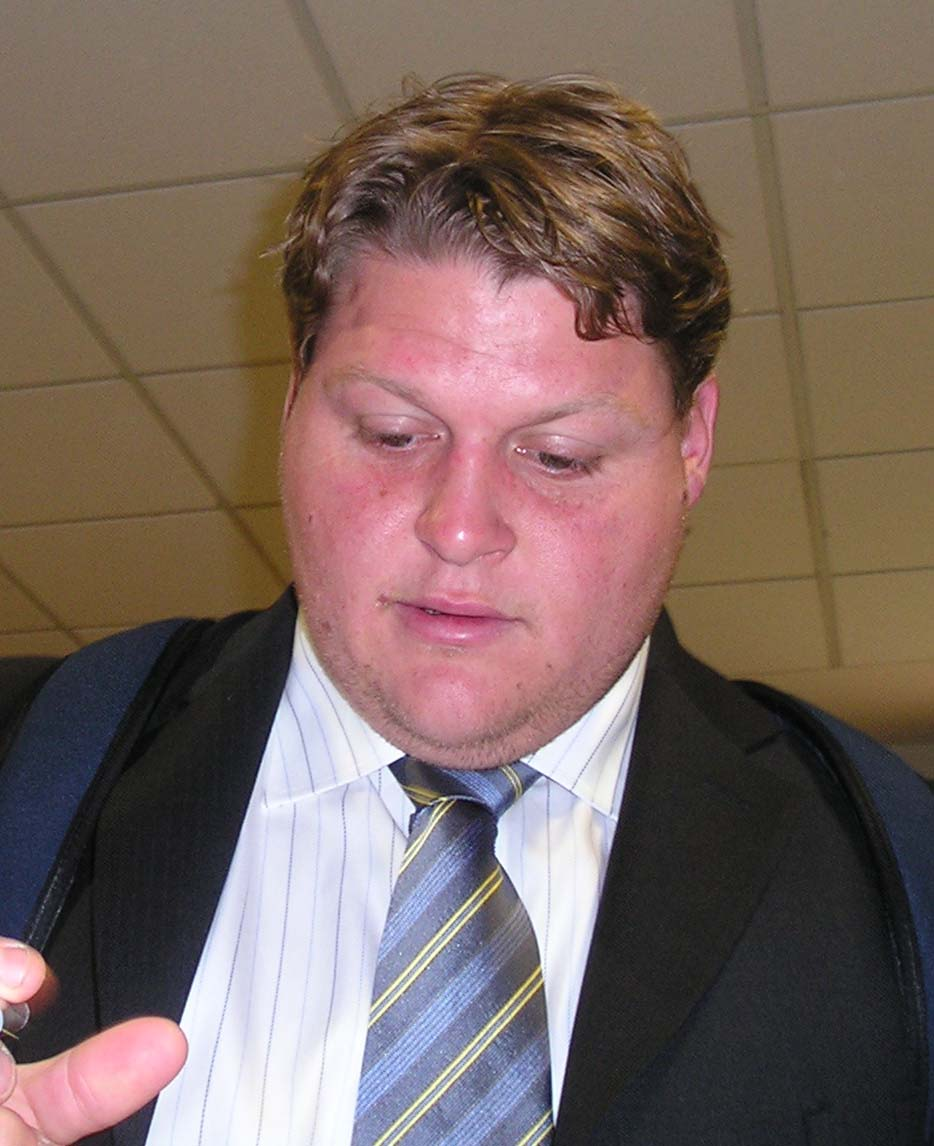
- Born: 19 December 1978 (age 47) Calgary, Alberta, Canada
- Height: 1.82 m (5 ft 11 1/2 in)
- Weight: 119 kg (18 st 10 lb)
- School: Northholm Grammar School
- University: Macquarie University
- Notable relative(s): Father - John Dunning Mother - Christine Dunning Brothers - Casey and Josh Dunning
- Occupation(s): Partner & Business Occupier Advisor at ResolveXO

Rugby union career
- Position: Prop
Amateur team(s)
Years	Team	Apps	(Points)
2013	Balmain RFC		
Senior career
Years	Team	Apps	(Points)
2000–11	Eastwood	85	(18)
Super Rugby
Years	Team	Apps	(Points)
2001–09	NSW Waratahs	90	(13)
2010–11	Western Force	20	(0)
International career
Years	Team	Apps	(Points)
2003–09	Australia	45	(0)
1998–99	Australia U-21		
1996	Australian Schoolboys		

Matthew Dunning (born 19 December 1978) is an Australian former rugby union footballer. He played as a prop for the Waratahs and Western Force in Super Rugby, and represented Australia. He coached the Balmain rugby club in Sydney 2013/2014.

== Early life ==
Dunning was born in Calgary, Canada, but grew up in Sydney, Australia. He was educated at Northholm Grammar School. In 1996, he was selected to represent New South Wales at the Australian Schools Rugby Championships. He went on to play for Australian Schools, U19s and U21s. His brother is Canadian prop Casey Dunning.

== Rugby career ==
Dunning made his debut for the New South Wales Waratahs in a Ricoh Championship match against Queensland in 2000, and played his first Super 14 match against the Chiefs in 2001. He made his international test debut on 25 October 2003 during the 2003 Rugby World Cup at the age of 24. The match against Namibia was won 142-0 and is the largest winning margin for an Australian side. The only other match he played in during the tournament was the 17–20 loss against England in the final. He is also known for his drop goal in the 2003 Super 12 season. His team, the NSW Waratahs, needed a bonus point to make the finals. Since the Waratahs were playing with advantage, and still needed two more tries to gain the bonus point, Dunning decided to kick a drop goal, which he assumed would miss. This would result in the penalty being awarded, which would allow the ball to be kicked into touch and possibly a line-out drive that could lead to a try. Unfortunately, the kick hit its mark and sailed through the posts, much to his and his teammates' dismay.

Dunning was selected for the 2007 Rugby World Cup and played in all four matches for Australia in the tournament including the 10–12 loss against England in the quarter final. His scrummaging style has at times been criticized.

In 2008, Dunning ruptured his right Achilles tendon playing for the Wallabies against the Barbarians at Wembley Stadium. It was the first time rugby union had been played at the stadium since it was rebuilt and the surface was unstable and dangerous. The injury kept him out of the 2009 Super 14 season but after a good spell with his Sydney club Eastwood, he forced his way back into the Wallabies for the 2009 northern hemisphere tour. In 2010 he joined the Western Force, where he played two seasons.

Dunning went to France in 2011 to join Top 14 club Biarritz Olympique, but was forced to withdraw from his contract and return to Sydney to undergo neck surgery. He played for Eastwood in their Shute Shield Grand Final Win over Sydney University in 2011, before retiring from top-level rugby.
