= Michael O'Dea (Australian politician) =

Australian solicitor and politician

Michael O'Dea AM, KCSG

35th Mayor of North Sydney
- In office 27 September 1972 – 21 September 1974
- Deputy: Peter Tranter; David Wyllie
- Preceded by: John Woodward
- Succeeded by: Innes Stanley Haviland

Alderman of the Municipality of North Sydney for Belmore Ward
- In office 29 March 1969 – 21 September 1974
- Preceded by: James Francis Cahill
- Succeeded by: Bruce John Jenkins

Personal details
- Born: 11 November 1938 (age 87) Potts Point, New South Wales, Australia
- Party: Independent
- Spouse: Marianne Mulders (m. 1963)
- Children: Nine, incl. Jonathan Richard O'Dea

John Michael O'Dea AM, KCSG (born 11 November 1938) is an Australian solicitor and former local government politician who served as an alderman and mayor of the Municipality of North Sydney. O'Dea was a solicitor with Carroll & O’Dea Lawyers from 1960 and was a partner from 1963 until his retirement in 2006. He is the father of the Speaker of the NSW Legislative Assembly, Jonathan O'Dea.

== Early life and career ==
O'Dea was born in Charlemont Private Hospital (now The Bourbon Hotel) on Darlinghurst Road, Potts Point, New South Wales, on 11 November 1938, the son of John Cecil (Cecil) O'Dea, a solicitor, and Joy Marjorie Roche. O'Dea's grandfather was John Henry (Jack) O'Dea, a prominent bookmaker (being first President of the NSW Bookmakers' Association), property developer, and Alderman of the Municipality of Randwick from 1911 to 1923.

With his father Cecil being an old boy of St Ignatius College, Riverview, O'Dea received his early education there before commencing law studies at the University of Sydney. In 1960 he obtained a Bachelor of Arts, followed by a Bachelor of Laws in 1963 and a Master of Laws in 1972. In 1960 he also joined his father's legal firm, Carroll & O'Dea, becoming a partner of the firm in 1963 when he graduated from law school. He became Managing Partner in 1971 on the departure of his father.

In 1963 he married Marianne Augustina Hubertina Mulders at the Riverview chapel, with Fr Charles Fraser SJ as the celebrant. They would have nine children: three boys and six girls. Following their marriage the O'Dea's moved from 857 New South Head Road, Rose Bay, and by 1968 were listed at Wollstonecraft.

== Political career ==
When the sitting Municipality of North Sydney Belmore Ward alderman, John Francis Cahill, died in February 1969, a by-election was held to fill his seat. On 29 March 1969, O'Dea was elected to fill the vacancy amongst a field of 13 other candidates. O'Dea was re-elected to a second full term on council at the municipal election held on 18 September 1971.

On 27 September 1972 O'Dea was elected to serve a single term as mayor, and was instrumental in progressing the controversial and ultimately unsuccessful Sabemo Ltd redevelopment proposal of the North Sydney Council Chambers site, supporting Council's approval of the plan in May 1973 and unveiling the stage one plans for several office towers on the block bounded by McLaren and Ridge Streets at a cost of $47 million in June 1973. Elected to a second term as mayor on 19 September 1973, O'Dea retired from Council in 1974 when he did not contest the September 1974 municipal elections.

== Later life and community service ==
On his departure from Council, O'Dea returned to his legal practice and was a member of the Advisory Board of St Ignatius College Riverview and St Aloysius' College, the founding Chairman of the Executive Board of Loreto Kirribilli, and a board member of the St Vincent de Paul Society, Sacred Heart Hospice and Mater Misericordiae Hospital. A long-serving member of the Catholic Parish of North Sydney, O'Dea was on the Province Advisory Councils of the Christian Brothers and the St John of God Brothers. O'Dea was the founding chair of the North Sydney Retirement Trust and the James Milson Nursing Home, North Sydney.

In the 1994 Australia Day Honours, O'Dea was made a Member of the Order of Australia (AM) for "service to the care of aged people, particularly through the North Sydney Retirement Trust and the James Milson Nursing Home." In 2002 O'Dea was awarded the Edmund Rice Bicentenary Medal for his "extraordinary support given to the mission of the Christian Brothers" from the Australian Province of the Christian Brothers, and in 2006 received the Jubilee medal of the First Companions from the Australian Province of the Society of Jesus. In 2006 he retired as Managing Partner of Carroll & O'Dea Lawyers and in 2008 was awarded a Papal Knighthood by Pope Benedict XVI as a Knight Commander of the Papal Order of St. Gregory the Great (KCSG), for distinguished services to the Church in the Archdiocese of Sydney.

Civic offices
Preceded by John Woodward	Mayor of North Sydney; 1972–1974	Succeeded by Innes Stanley Haviland
