= George Thomas Clarke =

Australian politician, accountant and estate agent (1853–1925)

George Clarke
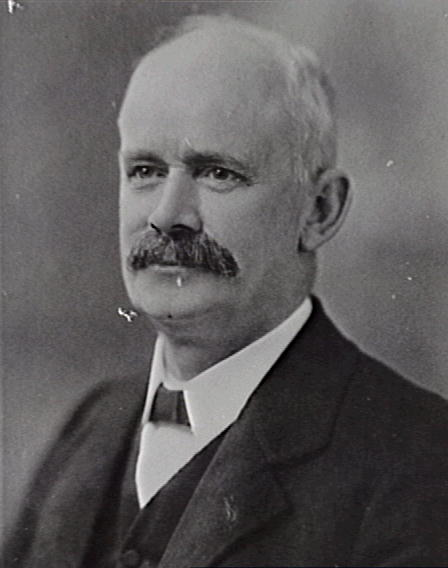
- Clarke c. 1905

44th Lord Mayor of Sydney
- In office 1 May 1912 – 31 December 1912
- Preceded by: Sir Allen Taylor
- Succeeded by: Arthur Cocks

Alderman of the City of Sydney
- In office 1 December 1904 – 30 November 1915
- Constituency: Belmore Ward

15th Mayor of North Sydney
- In office 12 December 1922 – 11 December 1923
- Preceded by: Henry Green
- Succeeded by: Charles William Watt

Alderman of the Borough of North Sydney
- In office 29 July 1890 – 10 February 1891
- In office 11 August 1891 – February 1895

Alderman of the Borough of St Leonards
- In office 13 February 1888 – 29 July 1890
- Constituency: Belmore Ward

Personal details
- Born: 13 November 1853 Melbourne, Colony of Victoria
- Died: 11 March 1925 (aged 71) Wollstonecraft, New South Wales, Australia
- Relatives: William Clarke (Brother)

George Thomas Clarke (13 November 1853 – 11 March 1925) was an Australian local government politician, accountant and estate agent. Clark served many years in local government, beginning in New Zealand when he was Town Clerk of South Dunedin and an alderman and mayor of St Kilda before coming to Sydney and was elected an Alderman of the City of Sydney, rising to become Lord Mayor for a single partial term from May to December 1912. Clarke also served a single term as Mayor of North Sydney (1922–1923), having served on both North Sydney Municipal Council and its predecessor the Borough of St Leonards.

== Early life and career ==
George Thomas Clarke was born in Melbourne in the Colony of Victoria on 13 November 1853, the son of William Joseph Sayers Clarke and Mary Ann Welsford. His elder brother William Clarke became prominent in banking and rose to be Member of Parliament for Orange and Minister for Justice in the Government of the Colony of New South Wales. After receiving his education at Collins Street Grammar School, Clarke studied accountancy but owing to health issues decided to travel away from busy Melbourne, taking a sea voyage in 1875. Clarke went no further than Dunedin in the Colony of New Zealand and after accepting warehouse work there, soon established his own accountancy and real estate business.

== Political career ==
In 1878 he was appointed Town Clerk of the Borough of South Dunedin, but later left office to become a Councillor. Clarke also served as a Councillor for the St Kilda Borough Council and was elected as mayor for two terms in 1878–1880. While in New Zealand, in 1876 Clarke joined the Independent Order of Odd Fellows, an interest in which he carried over when he returned to Australia, arriving in Sydney in the early 1880s.

After setting up his business in the St Leonards region in northern Sydney, Clarke re-entered municipal politics when he was elected as an Alderman for Belmore Ward of the Borough of St Leonards in February 1888. As a member of the St Leonards council in 1890, Clarke was involved in the official representations to the colonial government to merge St Leonards with the neighbouring boroughs of East St Leonards and Victoria to form a single North Sydney borough. These representations were subsequently accepted and the Borough of North Sydney was proclaimed on 29 July 1890. As the proclamation continued the terms of office of the three elected councils, Clarke continued as an aldermen for the new borough. Clarke was not among those elected to the new six-member council elected in February 1891, but succeeded in returning by way of a vacancy in August 1891.

He was elected an alderman of the City of Sydney in 1904, and was elected Lord Mayor in 1912.

== Later life ==
Survived by two sons, Clarke died while still serving as a North Sydney alderman on 11 March 1925 at his Wollstonecraft residence on Milner Crescent, "Domus", and was buried with Congregational and Masonic rites at Waverley Cemetery.

Civic offices
Preceded by Sir Allen Taylor	Lord Mayor of Sydney; 1912	Succeeded by Arthur Cocks
Preceded by Henry Green	Mayor of North Sydney; 1922–1923	Succeeded by Charles William Watt
