= The Abbey, Annandale =

Historic house in Sydney, Australia

The Abbey
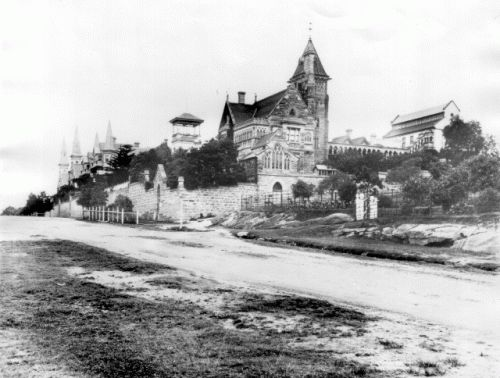
- The Abbey, c. 1880s

General information
- Architectural style: Victorian Free Gothic
- Location: 272 Johnston Street, Annandale, Inner West Council, New South Wales, Australia
- Coordinates: 33°52′28″S 151°10′25″E
- Completed: 1882; 144 years ago
- Renovated: 2015
- Client: John Young

Renovating team
- Architect: Alan Croker

New South Wales Heritage Database (Local Government Register)
- Official name: "The Abbey", house
- Type: Inner West Council local heritage (built)
- Designated: 23 December 2013
- Part of: “The Witches’ Houses”
- Reference no.: I65
- Type: House
- Category: Residential buildings (private)

The Abbey is an historic house located at 272 Johnston Street in the Sydney suburb of Annandale, New South Wales, Australia. The house is listed on the (now defunct) Register of the National Estate, the local government register in the New South Wales Heritage Database, and on the non-statutory register of the National Trust of Australia.

== History ==
The Abbey was built by John Young, a builder who had migrated from England to Australia. After working for some time as a builder in Melbourne, Young moved to Sydney and continued a successful career. In 1877, he bought land in what is now the suburb of Annandale, where he had visions of creating a garden suburb that would rival exclusive harbourside suburbs like Darling Point. He proceeded to build an extraordinary group of eight homes along a ridge near Rozelle Bay: The Abbey, Oybin, Kenilworth, Rozelle (since demolished), Greba, Hockindon, Highroyd and Claremont (since demolished).

The Abbey was the most outstanding of these homes, an "imaginative, romantic house loosely modelled on a Scottish manor". It was designed in a variation of the Victorian Free Gothic style and incorporated stencil work, hand-painted panels, timber architraves, a Gothic vault and a tower with gargoyles. Young was the principal builder of St Mary's Cathedral, and it was rumoured that he had stolen gargoyles from the cathedral to use on his Annandale homes. He also used reinforced concrete, quite an innovation at the time. Young was a Freemason and the house was decorated with Masonic symbols. It was completed in 1882. Young built the home to impress his wife and encourage her to return from England. She did not return and they never lived in it. The Abbey was occupied by housekeepers while Young lived in a house called Kentville, near Rozelle Bay, since demolished. From 1887, the ballroom and stables of The Abbey were used as a boarding house for private schools.

In 1924, the house was subdivided and converted to flats—the beginning of a long period of decline. In 1959 it was acquired by radio engineer Lancelot Davis for the sum of £4,500 for his son, newly graduated medical doctor Geoffrey Davis, who rose to prominence in the 1970s as a leading provider of family planning and abortion services in Sydney. As part of the bohemian Sydney Push scene, Geoffrey Davis "frequently hosted wild parties in the 1960s and '70s" in the 50-room mansion. He continued to lease out some of the original separate units for two decades while proceeding with a long-term restoration of the house.

In early 1983, the novelist Christina Stead lived in the house during her last months, cared for by Dr Davis's wife.

The Davis family occupied The Abbey for fifty years. Dr Davis died in 2008. In May 2009 the contents of the house were auctioned. The house itself was sold in November 2009, for $4.86 million. Although a record for Annandale at the time, it fell short of the $5 million the vendors had expected. It surpassed the $3.35 million paid for Kenilworth in 2007.

Gervase Davis believed the house was haunted. He claimed to have felt various presences from time to time, and a lady in white has been seen occasionally. Ghost hunters with "ectoplasmic machines" investigated the house in the 1970s. Francesca Davis believed that cats could sense the presence of spirits and her hackles would rise when such a presence came into the room.

Michael Hogan and Ann Sherry restored the house over four years to 2015, working with heritage architect Alan Croker. The renovation won a National Trust Heritage Award in May 2015. They sold The Abbey in November 2022 for $12.5 million.

The Abbey is listed on the (now defunct) Register of the National Estate on the local government register of the New South Wales Heritage Database, and on the non-statutory register of the National Trust of Australia.

== Gallery ==
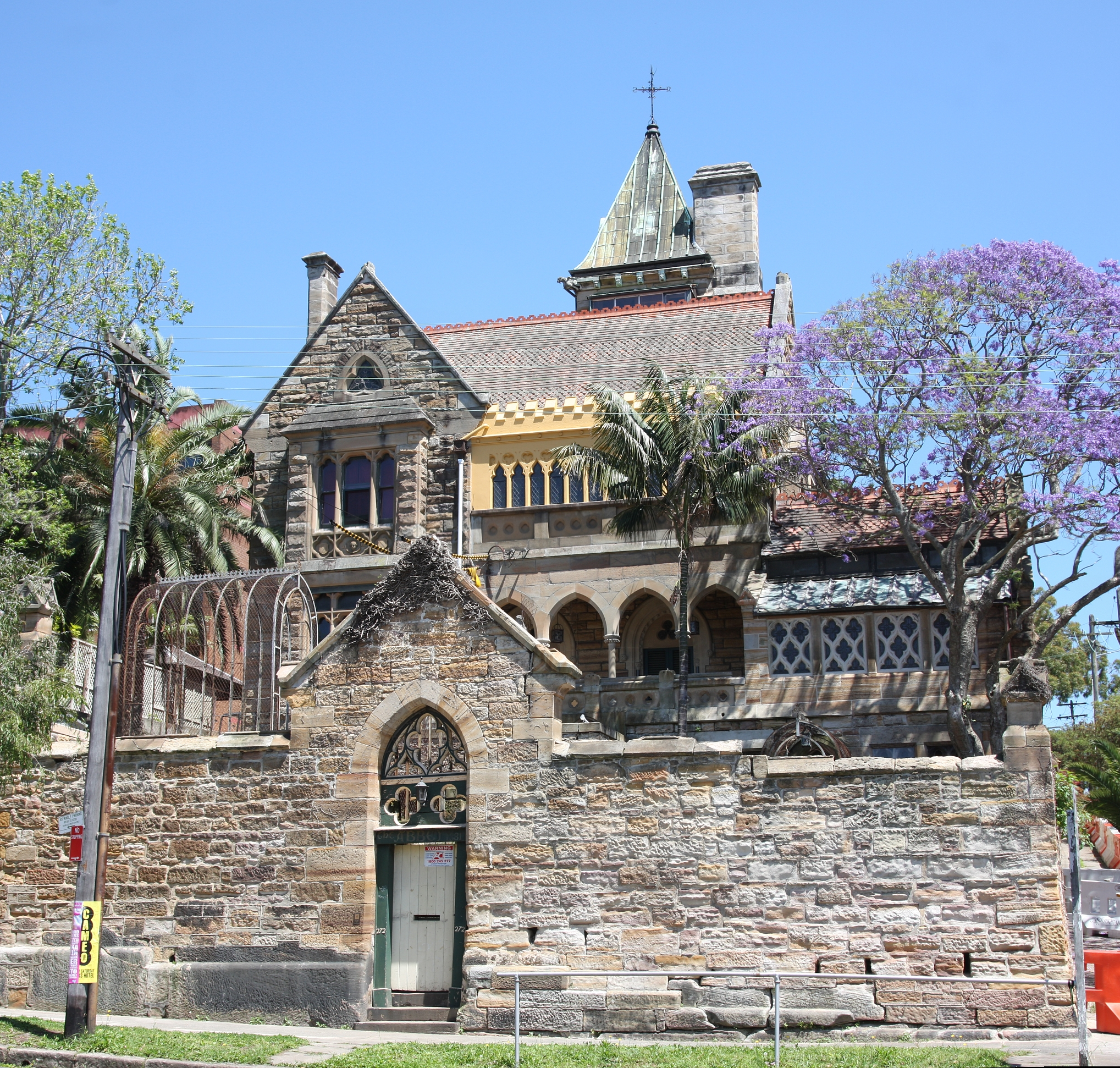
As viewed from Johnston Street

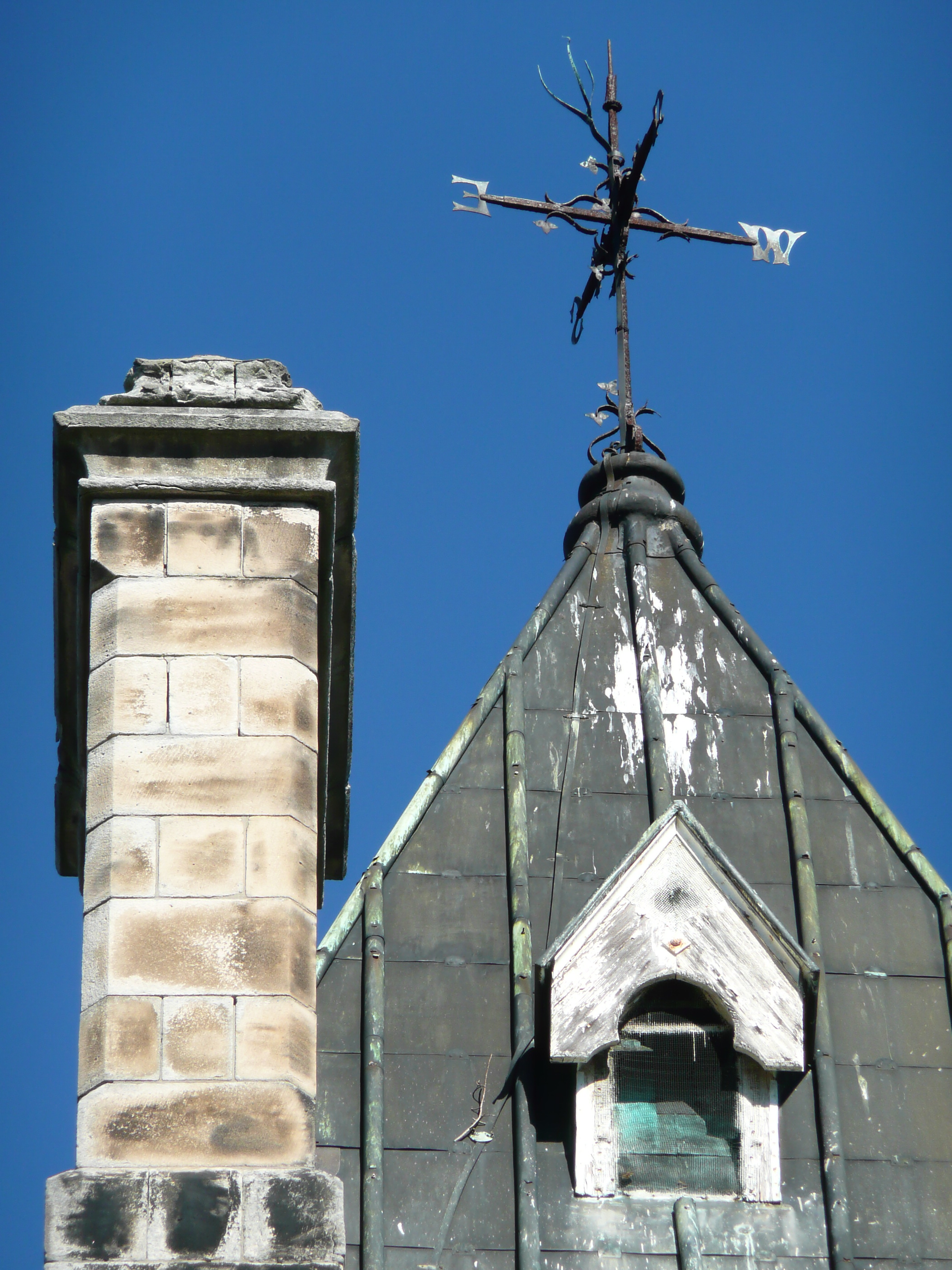
Detail of chimney

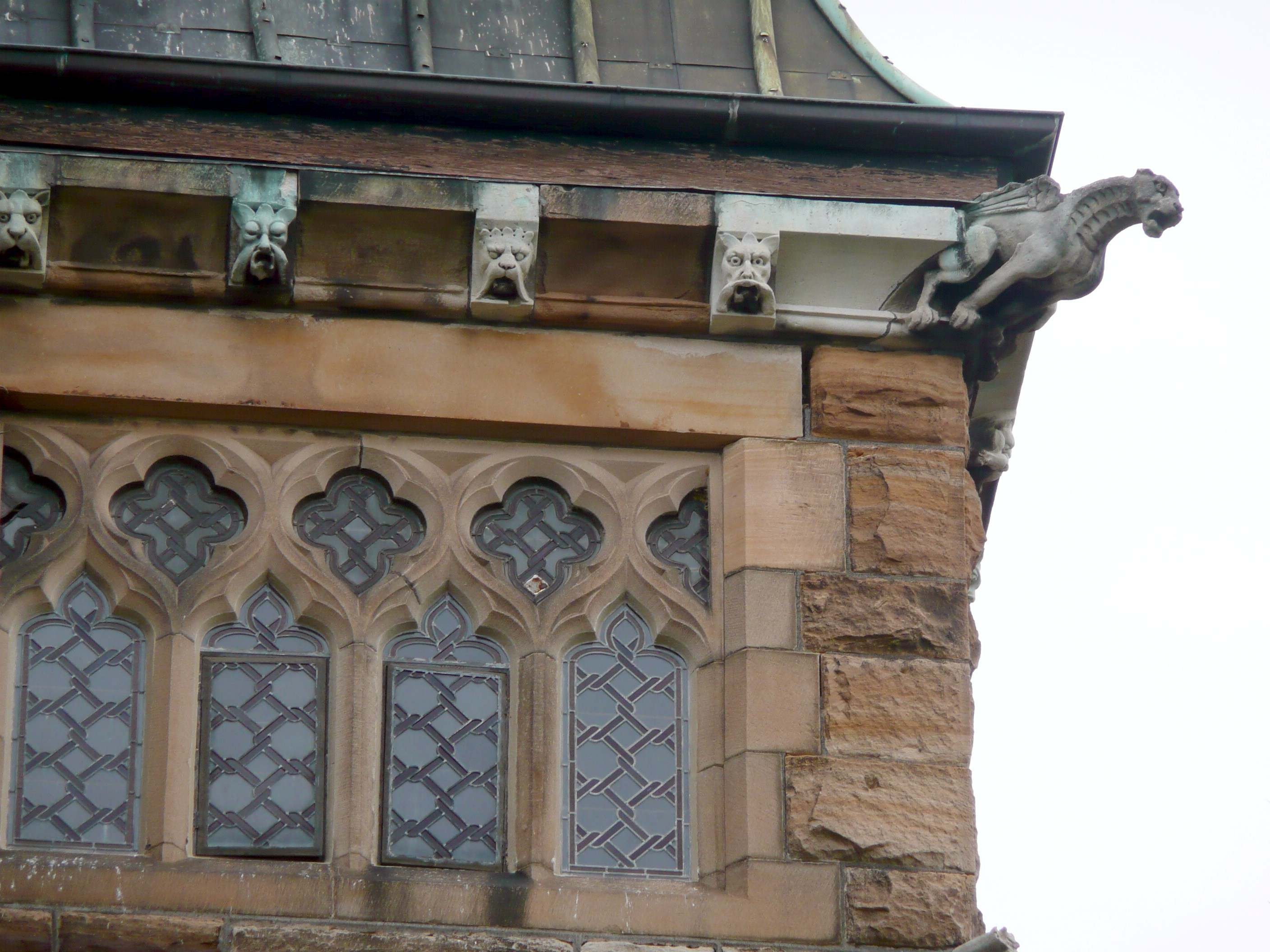
Detail of the tower with gargoyle

== See also ==
- List of historic homesteads in Australia
- Architecture of Sydney
