= Highroyd, Annandale =

Highroyd
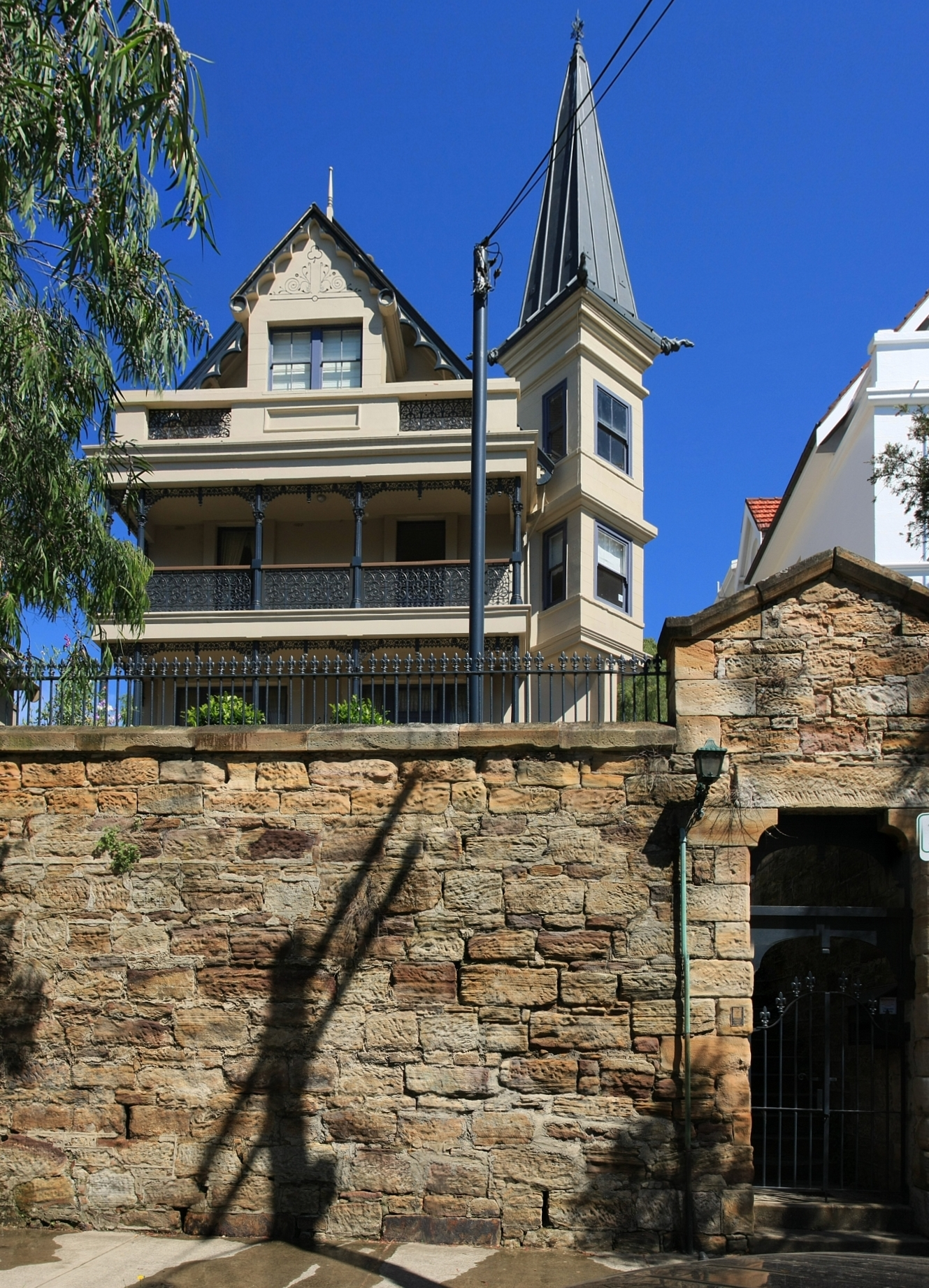
- Highroyd after restoration
- Former names: Melba

General information
- Type: House
- Architectural style: Victorian Rustic Gothic Revival
- Location: 262 Johnston Street, Annandale, New South Wales, Australia
- Coordinates: 33°52′31″S 151°10′24″E
- Construction started: 1886
- Completed: 1889
- Client: John Young

Design and construction
- Architects: John William Richards; John Young

New South Wales Heritage Database (Local Government Register)
- Official name: "Highroyd", house
- Type: Built
- Criteria: a., b., c., d., e., f., g.
- Designated: 23 December 2013
- Reference no.: Local register
- Group/collection: Residential buildings (private)
- Category: House
- Builder: John Young

Highroyd is a house in the Sydney suburb of Annandale, New South Wales, Australia. The house is listed on the Inner West Council local government heritage list.

== Description and history ==
Highroyd was built by John Young, a builder who migrated from England in 1855 and worked in the state of Victoria for some time before settling in Sydney in 1866. Young was responsible for building a number of heritage buildings in Sydney, including St Mary's Cathedral and St Francis Xavier's War Memorial Church in North Sydney. In 1877 he bought a parcel of land near Rozelle Bay, in the area now known as Annandale. His dream was to create a prestige suburb that would rival other exclusive residential areas in Sydney. The main street in this new area, Johnston Street, was intended to be "the finest street in the colony." On the west side of Johnston Street he built a group of eight large, idiosyncratic houses. At the head of this group was The Abbey, a sandstone Gothic mansion loosely modelled on a Scottish manor. It has been described as being "among that special breed of Free Gothic landmark buildings which once seen are not easily forgotten." The Abbey was intended to be a home for Young and his wife, but in fact they never lived there. Their home was a house called Kentville, near Rozelle Bay, which has since been demolished.

Next in line after The Abbey was Oybin, then Rozelle, Greba, Hockindon, Highroyd, Kenilworth and lastly Claremont. Highroyd and Hockindon were built for Young's daughters. They are designed in an identical style, the only difference being that Highroyd has a spire and Hockindon does not. Along with Kenilworth, they are popularly known as the "witches houses" because the spires are thought to resemble witches' hats. Apart from their distinctive design, the houses were also notable for their use of reinforced concrete, which was an innovation at the time.

With the depression of the 1890s, Annandale was subdivided and its character began to change, putting paid to Young's dream of a prestige suburb. It was the beginning of a long period of decline for Young's distinctive houses. The witches houses were divided into flats; Rozelle and Claremont were demolished and replaced with blocks of home units.

== Restoration ==
Highroyd was sold in 1988 for $700,000. Architect David Springett began to work for them on the restoration of the house, which involved undoing a great deal of damage and defacement that had accumulated over the years. So-called "hippies" had painted murals on the walls and covered the cedar staircase with a thick coat of green paint. Scraping the paint off the stairs was in itself a major job which took six months. The wrought iron balconies at the front of the house had been enclosed by previous owners to create more room; wrought iron for their restoration had to be made especially for the purpose. Gargoyles had to be made to decorate the spire; sculptor Hugh Reedman was commissioned for the job and produced four gargoyles that had to be lowered into position by crane.

The restoration of Highroyd took twenty years and resulted in the house being entered in the heritage category of Australian Institute of Architects New South Wales awards for 2009.

== Gallery ==
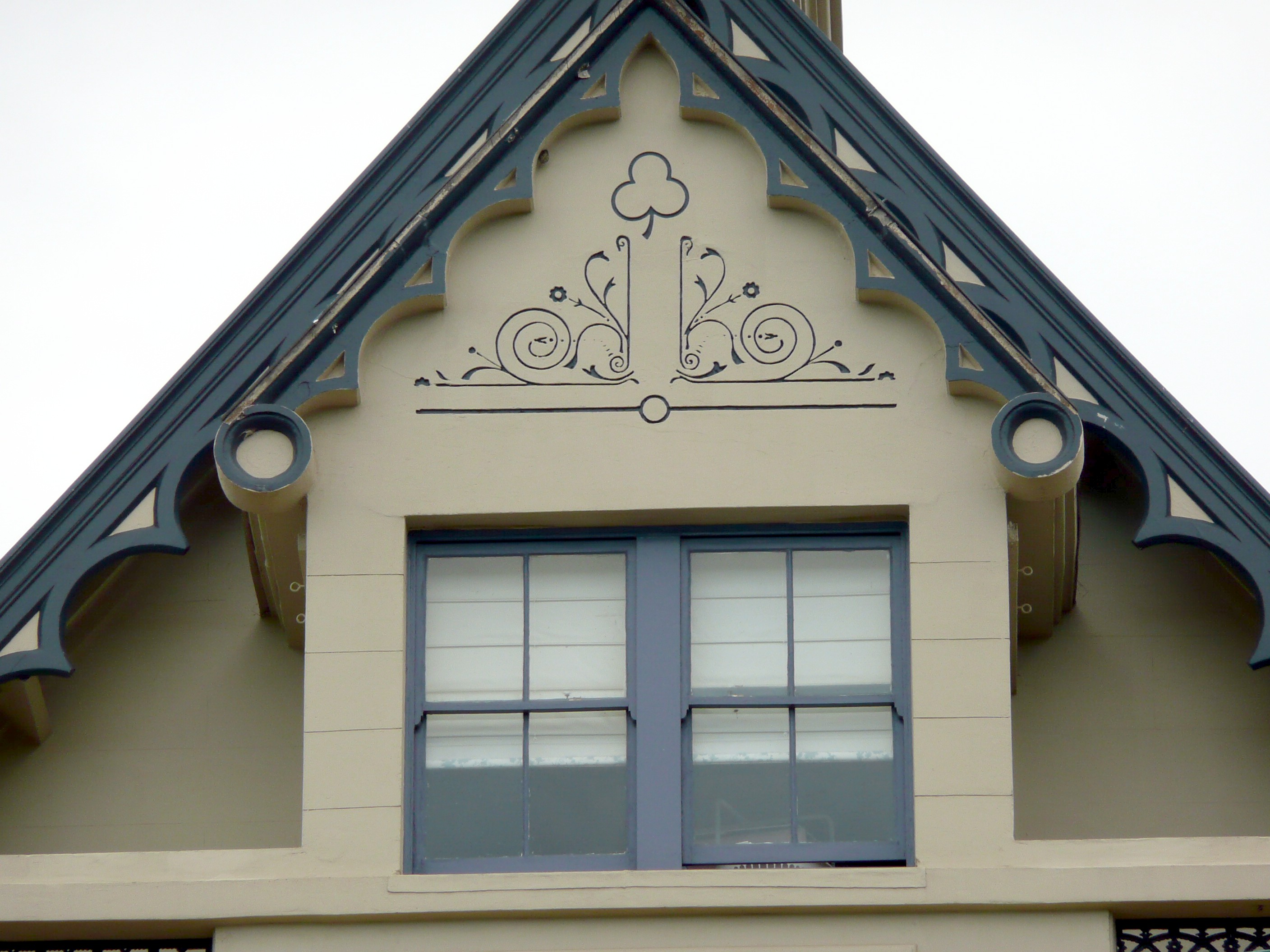
Detail of gable

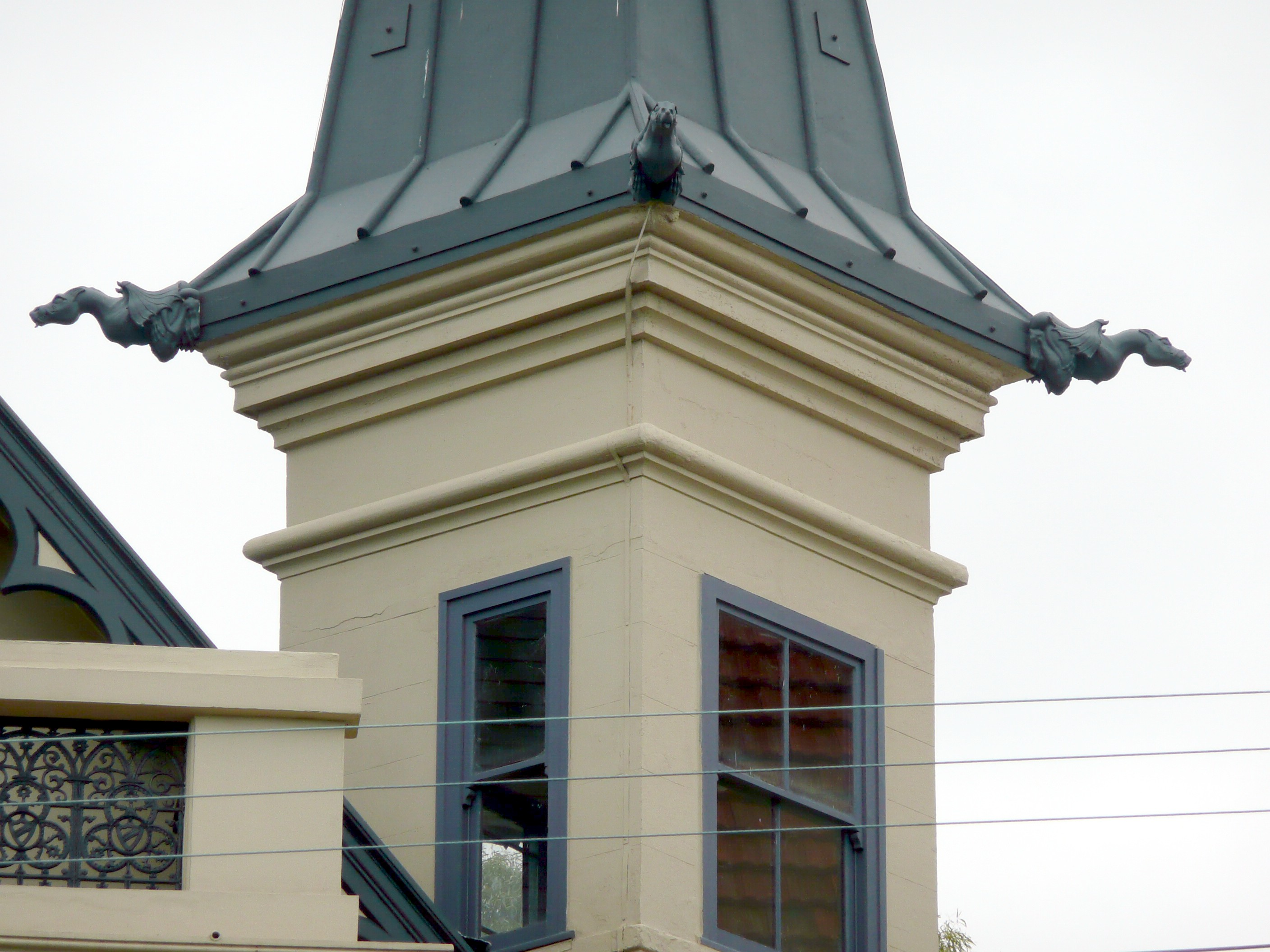
Gargoyles

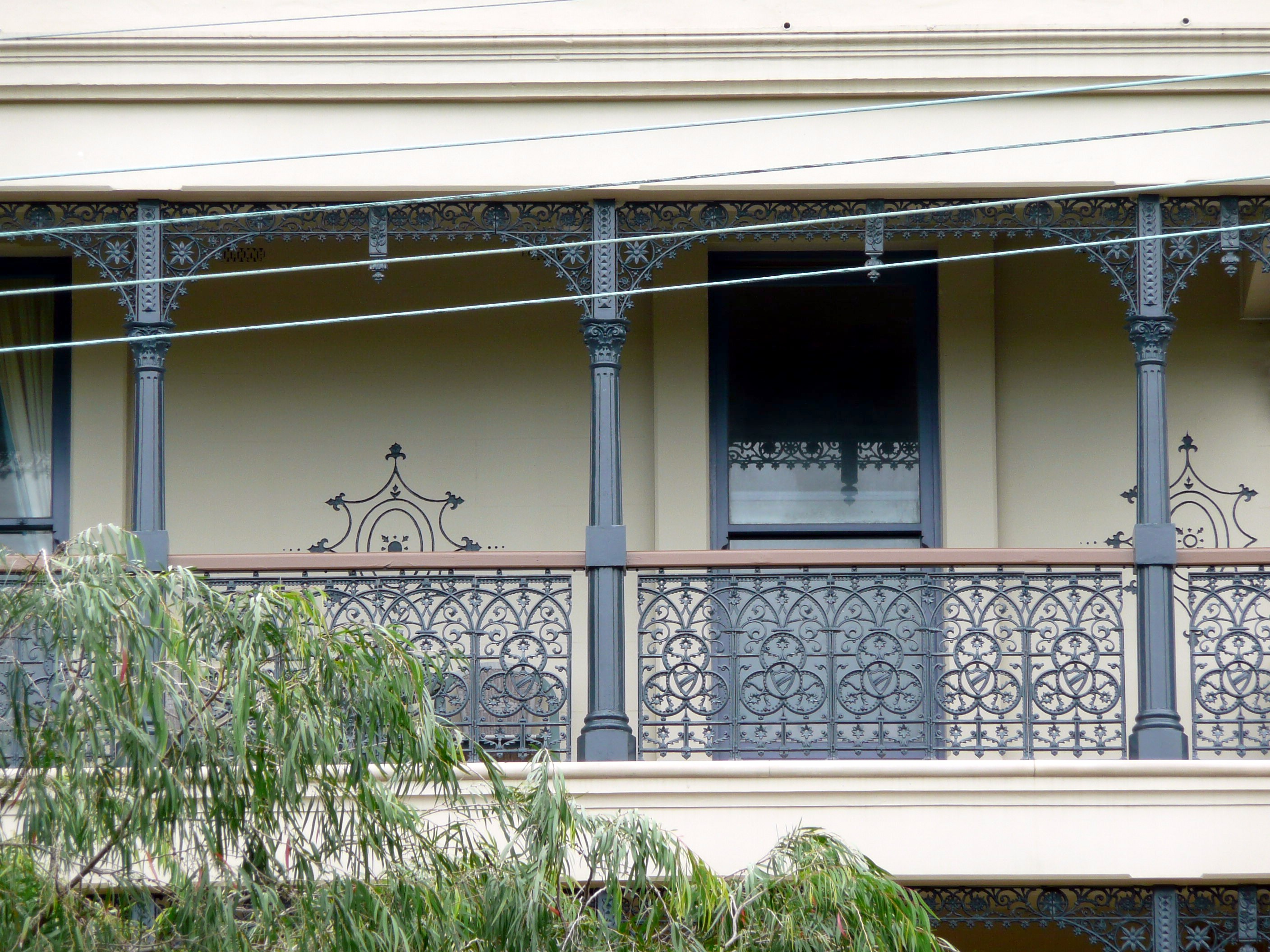
Restored wrought iron balcony
