= Allen Taylor =

Australian politician

The Honourable Sir Allen Taylor
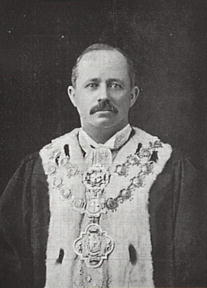

43rd Lord Mayor of Sydney
- In office 1 January 1905 – 31 December 1906
- Preceded by: Samuel Edward Lees
- Succeeded by: Sir Thomas Hughes
- In office 1 January 1909 – 1 May 1912
- Preceded by: Sir Thomas Hughes
- Succeeded by: George Thomas Clarke

Alderman of the Sydney City Council
- In office 1 December 1902 – 1 December 1912
- Constituency: Pyrmont Ward
- In office 1 December 1915 – 30 November 1924
- Constituency: Bourke Ward

Member of the Legislative Council of New South Wales
- In office 23 July 1912 – 30 September 1940

Personal details
- Born: 13 May 1864 Wagga Wagga, Colony of New South Wales
- Died: 30 September 1940 (aged 76) Centennial Park, New South Wales, Australia
- Spouse(s): Adela Mary Elliot (1886–1924); Linda Turner Hawkes (1926–1940)

Sir Allen Arthur Taylor (13 May 1864 – 30 September 1940) was an Australian businessman and New South Wales state politician who was Lord Mayor of Sydney, Mayor of Annandale and a member of the New South Wales Legislative Council.

== Early years and background ==
Allen Arthur Bate was born in Wagga Wagga, Colony of New South Wales, on 13 May 1864, the fourth child of John Bate, a bricklayer from Worcestershire, England, and his wife Martha Jane King.

For unknown reasons, Allen changed his surname from 'Bate' to 'Taylor' sometime between 1890 and 1895.

Eventually becoming a contractor, Taylor built up a business in timber supply and shipping, founding the firm of Allen Taylor & Company, of which he was managing director. In the 1890s he also became chairman of directors of the Illawarra Steam Navigation Company and the North Coast Steam Navigation Company, thus promoting economic development of the North and South coast regions of New South Wales. Expanding his business interests, Taylor also became a local director of the London Bank of Australia, a director of the Insurance Office of Australia and a trustee of the Government Savings Bank of New South Wales.

== Political career and later years ==
A prominent member of the Annandale, and indeed Sydney community, in 1895 Taylor stood and was elected as an Alderman on Annandale Municipal Council, which had the year before separated from the Leichhardt Municipality. He eventually rose to become Mayor from 1897 to 1900 and from 1901 to 1903. As mayor, Taylor worked towards the construction of a dedicated Council Chambers and town hall, which was completed during his term as mayor in September 1899. He would remain on the council until 1907 and Taylor Street in Annandale now bears his name. Taylor, while still an alderman for Annandale, was elected to Sydney City Council for Pyrmont Ward on 1 December 1902. After its formation in 1920, he was a member of the Civic Reform Association.

Taylor was eventually elected to be Lord Mayor of Sydney for two years from 1905 to 1906 and embarked on an ambitious programme of civic improvement, having acquired special powers from parliament for revenue-raising. Among his achievements during his time as Lord Mayor, particularly during his second term from January 1909 to May 1912, was the programme of slum-clearance around Wexford Street, Surry Hills, to create Wentworth Avenue, the widening of Oxford Street, to ease traffic and upgrade tram infrastructure, and the creation of the square that now bears his name at the centre of it in Darlinghurst. On 25 July 1911, he was made a Knight Bachelor for his service as Lord Mayor, on the occasion of King George V's coronation. In early May 1912, Taylor resigned as Lord Mayor owing to the 'strains of office'. Popular while in office, on his resignation the Sydney Morning Herald noted that Taylor as Lord Mayor had: "thus proved himself to be a man of fine capacity. His long views have been singularly well balanced by business acumen, as numerous resumption negotiations have shown. His municipal ideals have had for centre and substance the foundation of Sydney as a city worthy of its great future. His retirement is a public loss, but for himself personally is the consolation that he will carry with him into private life the esteem of the whole community."

In July 1912 Taylor was given a life appointment to the New South Wales Legislative Council. However, with the abolition of life appointments and the introduction of indirect elections to the council in 1933, Taylor was elected as a member on 5 December 1933. Taylor supported successive conservative parties in NSW, sitting in the Legislative Council for the Liberal Reform, Nationalist and United Australia parties respectively during his time on the council. On 1 December 1912, Taylor lost his seat on Sydney City Council and in January 1914 attempted to return via a by-election in Lang Ward caused by the resignation of former Lord Mayor Sir Arthur Cocks, but was unsuccessful against flour mill director, John Spencer Brunton.

He eventually returned, however, when he was elected on 1 December 1915 to serve on Bourke Ward. He served on council until he resigned on 30 November 1924. Following the death of Lady Taylor in May 1924, Taylor remarried on 29 December 1926 to Linda Turner Hawkes, née Carter. Taylor also served the community as a director of the Benevolent Society of New South Wales from 1909 to 1913 and of the Royal Prince Alfred Hospital from 1916 to 1936. On 30 September 1940, survived by his second wife and son, Taylor died at his home in Lang Road, Centennial Park and was buried in South Head Cemetery.

Civic offices
Preceded by John Young	Mayor of Annandale; 1897 – 1900	Succeeded by William Wells
Preceded by William Wells	Mayor of Annandale; 1901 – 1903	Succeeded by William Wells
Preceded by Samuel Edward Lees	Lord Mayor of Sydney; 1905 – 1906	Succeeded by Sir Thomas Hughes
Preceded by Sir Thomas Hughes	Lord Mayor of Sydney; 1909 – 1912	Succeeded by George Thomas Clarke
