= Municipality of Annandale =

Former local government area in New South Wales, Australia

Municipality of Annandale New South Wales
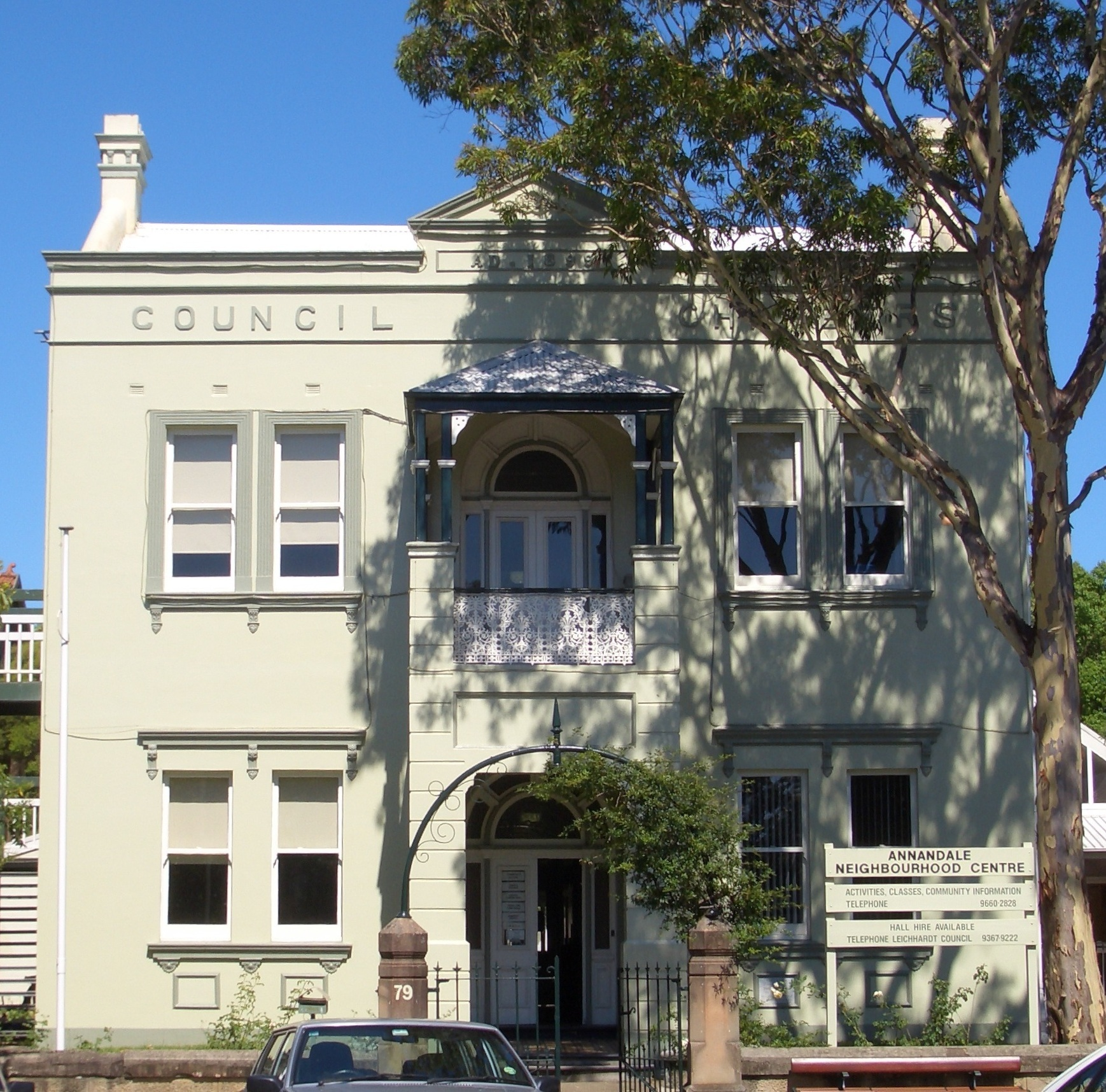
- Annandale Council Chambers, c. 1899, designed by J.W.Richards
- Population: 12,396 (1947 census)
  - Density: 8,900/km^{2} (22,900/sq mi)
- Established: 29 December 1893
- Abolished: 31 December 1948
- Area: 1.4 km^{2} (0.5 sq mi)
- Council seat: Annandale Council Chambers
- Region: Inner West
- Parish: Petersham
LGAs around Municipality of Annandale:
Balmain	Rozelle Bay
Leichhardt	Municipality of Annandale	The Glebe; Camperdown
	Petersham

The Municipality of Annandale was a local government area of Sydney, New South Wales, Australia. The municipality was proclaimed on 29 December 1893 as the Borough of Annandale when the East Ward of Leichhardt Council separated, and, with an area of 1.4 square kilometres, covered the entire suburb of Annandale, excepting a small block between Johnstons Creek, Booth Street and Parramatta Road. The council was amalgamated with the Municipality of Leichhardt (now the Inner West Council) to the west with the passing of the Local Government (Areas) Act 1948.

== Council history and location ==
The area of Annandale, bounded by Whites Creek and Johnstons Creek in the west and east respectively and by Rozelle Bay and Parramatta Road in the north and south respectively, was first incorporated in 1871 when it was included as the East Ward within the Municipality of Leichhardt. However, the governing act in the Colony of New South Wales for local government, the Municipalities Act 1867, provided for the division of an existing municipality if a petition was made to the Governor by at least two-thirds of residents or owners of rateable property in the area. As a consequence, a requisite petition of the electors of the East Ward, which argued that the East Ward benefited little from its inclusion in Leichhardt and proposed a separate Borough of Annandale, was published in the Government Gazette on 17 June 1893.

The Borough of Annandale was subsequently proclaimed by Governor Sir Robert Duff on 29 December 1893 and was constituted on 1 February 1894. The council first met in the Methodist School Hall on Trafalgar Street on 14 February 1894, with all three former East Ward aldermen having been returned the day before, including Alderman John Young, who was elected as the first Mayor of Annandale. The first purpose-built Annandale Council Chambers, on Johnston Street, was completed at a cost of £1528 and was officially opened on 21 September 1899 by Mayor Allen Taylor in the presence of the Member for Annandale, William Mahony. From 28 December 1906, with the passing of the Local Government Act, 1906, the council was renamed as the "Municipality of Annandale". In 1937 various minor boundary transfers around the Johnstons Creek area were made between Annandale and The Glebe Council. The longest serving alderman was Edward Hogan, who served 38 years as an alderman from 1906 to 1944 including several terms as mayor.

By the end of the Second World War, the NSW Government had come to the conclusion that its ideas of infrastructure expansion could not be realised by the present system of the mostly-poor inner-city municipal councils and the Minister for Local Government, Joseph Cahill, pushed through a bill in 1948 that abolished a significant number of those councils. Annandale was abolished and amalgamated with the Municipality of Leichhardt following the enactment of the Local Government (Areas) Act 1948, which came into effect from 1 January 1949. The former Annandale Municipality became the first ward of the Leichhardt Municipal Council returning four aldermen.

== Mayors ==
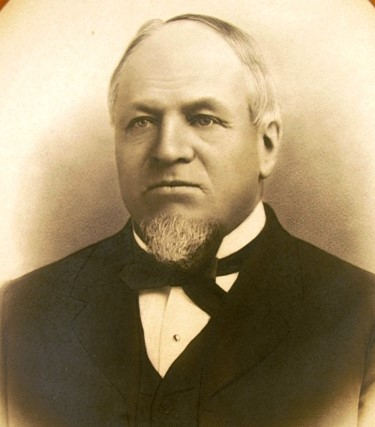
John Young (1827–1907), first Mayor (1894–1897), Mayor of Leichhardt (1879–1880, 1885–1886) and Mayor of Sydney (1885–1886)

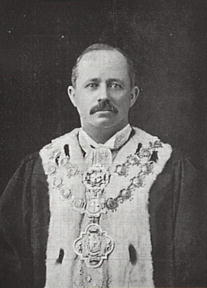
Sir Allen Taylor (1864–1940), Mayor (1897–1900, 1901–1903), Lord Mayor of Sydney (1905–1906, 1909–1912).

Years	Mayor	Notes
14 February 1894 – 10 February 1897	John Young	
10 February 1897 – 8 August 1900	Allen Taylor	
8 August 1900 – 14 February 1901	William Wells	
14 February 1901 – 12 February 1903	Allen Taylor	
12 February 1903 – 11 February 1904	William Wells	
11 February 1904 – 13 February 1907	Owen Ridge	
13 February 1907 – February 1910	William Wells	
February 1910 – 7 February 1913	James Robertson	
7 February 1913 – February 1915	Thomas Colebrook	
February 1915 – 5 February 1918	Edward Hogan	
5 February 1918 – 4 February 1919	Frederick Smith	
4 February 1919 – December 1921	Arthur Ernest Packer	
December 1921 – December 1922	Charles Schofield	
December 1922 – December 1923	Edward Hogan	
December 1923 – 11 December 1925	Walter Ridge	
11 December 1925 – December 1930	John William Sharpe	
December 1930 – 6 December 1932	Edward Hogan	
6 December 1932 – 13 July 1933	Charles Winkworth	
27 July 1933 – December 1935	Matthew Smith	
December 1935 – December 1936	George William Marshall	
December 1936 – December 1937	William Johnston	
December 1937 – December 1938	Edward Hogan	
December 1938 – 13 December 1939	Sydney Francis	
13 December 1939 – 9 December 1940	John James Field	
9 December 1940 – 15 December 1940	Percival Druitt McDonald	
December 1940 – December 1941	William Boyd	
December 1941 – 17 December 1942	Edward Hogan	
17 December 1942 – 12 December 1944	George Henry Law	
12 December 1944 – 31 December 1948	James Prendergast	

== Town Clerks ==
Years	Town Clerk	Notes
9 March 1894 – 26 June 1902	John James Skelton	
22 July 1902 – 1 December 1926	John Golden Hinsby	
13 December 1926 – 1 April 1927	James Reid (acting)	
1 April 1927 – 1 October 1928	F. D. Cooper	
1 October 1928 – 31 December 1948	James Reid	
