= John Woodward (lawyer) =

Australian lawyer (1934–2022)

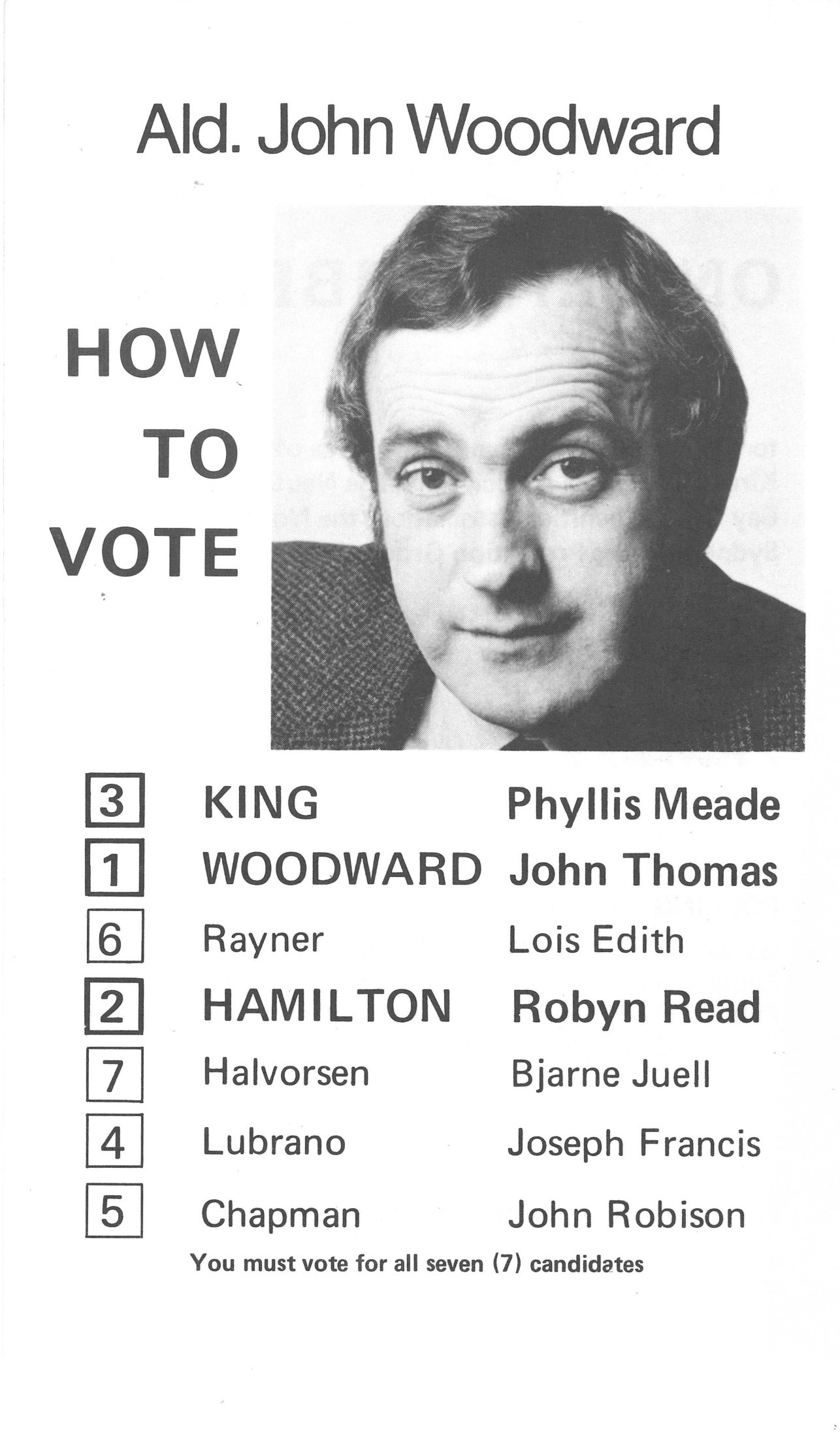

34th Mayor of North Sydney
- In office 23 September 1971 – 27 September 1972
- Deputy: Peter Tranter
- Preceded by: Michael Fitzpatrick
- Succeeded by: Michael O'Dea

Deputy Mayor of North Sydney
- In office 13 December 1968 – 11 December 1970
- Mayor: Joseph Vincent Bugler; Michael Fitzpatrick
- Preceded by: Frederick James Brunton
- Succeeded by: Helen Gordon Cook

Alderman of the Municipality of North Sydney for Kirribilli Ward
- In office 4 December 1965 – 21 September 1974

Personal details
- Born: 1 November 1934 Watsons Bay, New South Wales, Australia
- Died: 6 August 2022 (aged 87) Tokyo, Japan
- Party: Independent
- Education: University of Sydney

John Thomas Woodward (1 November 1934 – 6 August 2022) was an Australian sportsman, politician, lawyer, and public servant.

== Early life ==
John Thomas Woodward was born in Watsons Bay, Australia on 1 November 1934.

He was a keen sailor, member of the Vaucluse Yacht Club. He skippered 'Flying Dutchman' to win the VJ Amateur Sailing Association, Commonwealth Championship of 1952-53 and was Senior Club VJ Champion in 1953-54.

== Legal career ==
In 1959, Woodward completed a Bachelor of Laws at University of Sydney. He concluded his direct involvement in the legal profession in 1974 as a solicitor / partner with Currie & Currie located in King St, Sydney.

== Political career ==
Woodward was an alderman from the Kirribilli ward of the North Sydney Council from 1965 to 1974, Deputy Mayor from December 1968 to December 1970, and Mayor of North Sydney from September 1971 to September 1972. During his time with North Sydney Council, Woodward advocated protecting local heritage, reducing housing density and loss of trees, and establishing community services.

From 1976 until 1979, Woodward was Director (in the Premiers Advisory Unit) reporting to Neville Wran, the Premier of NSW.

== Environmental and planning career ==
From 1981 to 1992 he was Chairman of the NSW Office of The Commissioners of Inquiry for Environment and Planning and authored (or co-authored) over 55 reports covering planning and environmental enquiries conducted in NSW during that time.

Some of the more notable inquiries included:

- A recommendation not to proceed with the F2- Expressway (Stage I – Beecroft to Ryde), but which ultimately became part of the M2 Hills Motorway
- Objections to a conservation order The Royal Automobile Club of Australia
- A controversial and unsuccessful application for the relocation of a Bayer pesticide plant in Kurnell.
- A successful application for a BHP Mini Mill at Rooty Hill, NSW

Between 1993 and 1996, he completed a further three environmental based inquiries:

- Commonwealth Commission of Inquiry, Shoalwater Bay Capricornia Coast, Queensland, Australia.
- Commonwealth Commission of Inquiry, East Coast Armaments Complex Point Wilson, Victoria.
- A proposal for future use of lands at Lucas Heights : Lucas Heights mediation / Sutherland Shire Council and Waste Service NSW.

In 1999 he completed an assessment into the amalgamation of the South Sydney, Randwick and Botany Bay councils.

== Later life ==
In his later years, he moved to Tokyo, Japan, where he died aged 87 on 6 August 2022. North Sydney Council passed a condolence motion at its meeting on 22 August 2022, with the motion from the mayor, Zoë Baker, acknowledging his "contribution to North Sydney and NSW, particularly, his legacy of a commitment to strong environmental sustainability and excellent town planning."

Civic offices
| Preceded by Frederick Brunton | Deputy Mayor of North Sydney; 1968 – 1970 | Succeeded by Helen Cook |
| Preceded by Michael Fitzpatrick | Mayor of North Sydney; 1971 – 1972 | Succeeded by Michael O'Dea |
