= Casey Dunning =

Canada international rugby union player

- Born: Casey Dunning; 18 June 1980 (age 46) Calgary, Alberta, Canada
- Height: 1.83 m (6 ft 0 in)
- Weight: 114 kg (17 st 13 lb)
- University: University of Western Sydney
- Notable relative: Matt Dunning

Rugby union career
- Position: Prop
Senior career
Years	Team	Apps	(Points)
2006–2007	Pertemps Bees		
2007	London Irish	1	
International career
Years	Team	Apps	(Points)
	Canada	5	

Casey Dunning (born 18 June 1980) is an international rugby union player for Canada, who grew up in Australia. He plays at prop and played for English club Pertemps Bees during 2006–07 season. In the 2006–07 season Dunning broke his ankle which resulted with him being side-lined for many months, however he did make a return at the end of the season. Dunning was included along with, at the time, fellow Bees player Brodie Henderson in the list of reserves for Canada's Churchill Cup 07 which was held in England. Dunning is one of two Canadian international props that have played for Pertemps Bees, the other being Kevin Tkachuk who has captained his country on 5 occasions and now plays for Glasgow Warriors. Shortly before the start of the Guinness Premiership 2007–08 season he signed with Premiership team London Irish as short term cover for the 2007 Rugby World Cup. Dunning signed with the Nelson Bay (NSW) Groupers in April 2009.

Dunning was born in Calgary, Alberta, Canada. His brother is Australian prop Matt Dunning.
