= John Lincoln (judge) =

John Francis Lincoln
- Born: 30 July 1916; Launceston, Tasmania
- Died: 14 November 2011 (aged 95); Erina, New South Wales
- Education: Newington College; Balliol College, Oxford
- Occupations: Barrister, Electoral Commissioner, Judge
- Title: His Honour Dr John Lincoln AM
- Spouse: Joan (née Hamilton-Scott)
- Children: 2
- Parent: J Lincoln

John Francis Lincoln (30 July 1916 – 14 November 2011) was an Australian judge of the District Court of New South Wales and a New South Wales Electoral Commissioner. For thirty years he was Chancellor of the Anglican Diocese of Newcastle and at the time of his death he was Emeritus Deputy Chancellor of Macquarie University.

== Early life ==
Lincoln was born in Launceston and spent his early life living with his family in the suburb of Burwood, New South Wales. He was educated at Newington College (1929–1934). In 1929, Lincoln joined the 1st Burwood Scout Troop and when attending a Jamboree in Sydney he secured admission to study Law at Balliol College, Oxford. After Joining the British Army, and whilst on leave from training in Scotland, he was admitted to the Bar, Lincoln's Inn, at the Inns of Court. During World War II he served as a Major in the Intelligence Corps.

== Legal career ==
At war's end, Lincoln was appointed as a Deputy Assistant Judge Advocate General in India and Singapore, and served in that role until 1947. On his return to Australia, he was admitted to the NSW Bar Association and during 1949 he was Acting Associate to Chief Justice Sir Frederick Jordan. He was a member of the administrative committee of the Commonwealth and Empire Law Conference in 1965. In 1967, Lincoln was appointed as an Acting Judge of the Supreme Court of New South Wales. The following year he was appointed as a Judge of the District Court of New South Wales and he remained in that position until retirement in 1986. His Associates included Christopher Whittall, Justin Fleming and his son, Philip Lincoln.

== Honours ==
Northholm Grammar School established a fourth house in 1984 and named it Lincoln in honour of its founding chairman. In the Australia Day Honours List of 1985, Lincoln was made a member of the Order of Australia in the General Division "for service to the community, particularly in the field of prisoner rehabilitation". He was made an Honorary Rotarian in 1986. The Lincoln Building at Macquarie University was named in his honour in 1996.

== Family and death ==
On 24 January 1952, Lincoln married Joan Hamilton-Scott, who predeceased him in 2000. They had one son, Philip, and one daughter, Christina. The Lincoln family lived for many years in St Ives, New South Wales and as a widower John lived in Copacabana, dying in neighbouring Erina. His funeral service was held Christ Church Anglican, Gosford.

== Community service ==
=== Prisoners ===
Lincoln served as Chairman of the Parole Board of New South Wales. He was a Fellow of the Australian Institute of Welfare and Community Workers and served as Senior Vice-president and President of the Prisoners Aid Association of NSW.

=== Music ===
From 1957 until 1975, Lincoln served as vice-president and then from 1975 until his death as President of the North Sydney Symphony Orchestra.

=== Marriage Guidance ===
From 1966 until 1968, Lincoln served as chairman and from 1968 until 1970 as President of the Marriage Guidance Council of New South Wales.

=== Health services ===
Lincoln served as Chairman of the North Sydney Community Hospital and Chairman of the Centre of Bone and Joint Diseases from 1962 until 1998. In that year it was named the Lincoln Centre for Research into Bone and Joint Diseases in his honour and he continued to serve as its chair until his death.

=== Anglican Church ===
Lincoln was Chancellor of the Anglican Diocese of Newcastle from 1978 until 2008. He was a member of the Standing Committee of the Provincial Synod and a member of the general and diocesan synods of the Anglican Church of Australia.

=== Macquarie University ===
From 1958 until 1964, Lincoln was the chairman of the committee to establish a university on the northern side of Sydney. He was a member of the council of Macquarie University from 1963, vice-president in 1976 and Deputy Chancellor from 1976 until 2000 when he was appointed emeritus Deputy Chancellor. From 1977 until 1980, Lincoln was President of the Australian Universities Graduate Conference.

=== Northholm Grammar ===
Lincoln served as the founding Chairman of Northholm Grammar School from 1981 until 1998.

=== Scouts ===
Having joined Scouts in 1929, Lincoln served as District Commissioner of North Sydney district from 1960 until 1973, North Metropolitan Area Vice-president in 1973 and Area Regional President from 1974 until his death. The Scout Council of New South Wales made him a Life Councillor. He was Patron Australian Police Scouters Association from 1990 until 2003.

=== Swimming ===
Lincoln was also the Patron of the North Sydney Swimming Club for many years. Each year he would contribute to the development of young swimmers. He was always notable with his presence, at the AGM meetings and presentation days.

=== Government and politics ===
Lincoln was chairman of the Northern Suburbs Municipal and Shire Conference in 1957 and Mayor of North Sydney Council from 1956 until 1958 having been Deputy Mayor from 1954. He was a member of the Town Planning Committee for North Sydney from 1953 until 1956. Within the Liberal Party of Australia, Lincoln served as the Honorary Treasurer for New South Wales and as a member of the Federal Council. In 1990 and 1991, Lincoln served as the New South Wales Electoral Commissioner.
