= The Second Bridegroom =

1991 novel by Australian writer Rodney Hall

- Author: Rodney Hall
- Language: English
- Series: Yandilli
- Genre: Fiction
- Publisher: McPhee Gribble
- Publication date: 1991
- Publication place: Australia
- Media type: Print
- Pages: 214 pp.
- Awards: ALS Gold Medal winner 1992
- ISBN: 0869142518
- Preceded by: Captivity Captive
- Followed by: The Grisly Wife

The Second Bridegroom (1991) is a novel by Australian writer Rodney Hall. It was originally published by McPhee Gribble in Australia in 1991.

This novel is the first book in The Yandilli Trilogy (also referred to as A Dream More Luminous Than Love), though the second to be published, followed by the novels Captivity Captive in 1988, and The Grisly Wife in 1993.

== Synopsis ==
In the early 19-century an English printer forges a copy of a book by William Caxton. He is arrested, tried and sentenced to transportation to New South Wales. Along the way he murders a fellow prisoner who has been tormenting him and when he arrives in Australia he is sent to work on the land grant of Mr Atholl. Once unshackled he escapes into the bush where he is taken in my a mob of Indigenous Australians.

The novel is based on "a Celtic myth of the Goddess who takes a summer bride groom with a horse's mane, a winter bridegroom with goat thighs. Every sixth month, the second bridegroom ritually kills the first."

== Publishing history ==
After its initial publication in Australia by McPhee Gribble in 1991, the novel was reprinted as follows:

- Faber, UK 1991
- Farrar Straus Giroux, USA 1991

The novel was also translated into German in 1993.

== Critical reception ==
Writing in The Canberra Times Stephen Saunders noted: "Hall is now well known and well reviewed overseas, and it cannot be said he is without honour here. There is still a suspicion that many of his countrymen who could read him with pleasure don't read him. This would be a pity. Although his books are mysterious, they are written plain for heart and skin rather than complex for dry study. Like Randolph Stow, also born 1935, he provides new fables for an old land."

In The Los Angeles Times Richard Elder had some doubts about the book: "The novel intercuts, in a deliberately erratic rhythm, among his youth on Britain’s Isle of Man, his manacled voyage to Australia, and what happens to him after he arrives. Appropriately to the theme, he recalls the years at home with a certain concreteness, while the journey and the time in Australia become more and more uncertain and ambiguous. At some point he goes mad. We are not quite sure when, and that creates our increasing displacement inside his narrative...There are beautiful and haunting moments in Hall’s story. But it is too disordered in its intuitive and daring connections and disconnections to work very well. Everything in the narrator’s tumultuous words is suggestive, but many of the suggestions seem not to lead anywhere."

== Awards ==
- ALS Gold Medal winner 1992
- Miles Franklin Award shortlisted 1992

== See also ==
- 1991 in Australian literature
