= Vortex (Hall novel) =

2024 novel by Australian author Rodney Hall

- Author: Rodney Hall
- Language: English
- Genre: Novel
- Publisher: Picador
- Publication date: 2024
- Publication place: Australia
- Media type: Print
- Pages: 464 pp.
- Awards: 2025 The Age Book of the Year Award – Fiction, winner
- ISBN: 9781761560767

Vortex is a 2024 novel by the Australian author Rodney Hall originally published by Picador.

It was the winner of the 2025 The Age Book of the Year Award – Fiction.

== Synopsis ==
The novel follows a cast of characters in Brisbane as the city prepares for the visit of the newly crowned Queen Elizabeth II in 1954. It is also the coming-of-age story of 16-year-old Compton Gillespie who meets an older German immigrant, Beckmann, who becomes his mentor in life.

== Critical reception ==
James Ley, writing in Australian Book Review noted that this book is "a substantial addition to Hall's already substantial body of work. It is a novel that draws its full measure of vitality from its concerted attempt to recreate a particular time and place. Capacious and richly descriptive, it at times earns the labels loose and baggy; it sets out to cover an extraordinary amount of historical ground."

On The Conversation website, Tony Hughes-d'Aeth found much to admire in the writer's style and prose: "It would be remiss to not mention the beauty of this novel, which emerges at different scales. Most immediately, it is a joy to read the limpid prose that skips about with such mercurial agility. The style is somehow both languid and aphoristic. There is a stinging sharpness in the novel's droll humour that speaks to a certain foundational absurdity."

== Awards ==
- 2025 The Age Book of the Year Award – Fiction, winner
- 2025 Voss Literary Prize, longlisted

== Notes ==
Author's note: For my daughters, Imogen, Delia and Cressida (all unutterably dear to me) who - having constantly stimulated the work with facts and ideas - will each recognize her touch in these pages.

== See also ==
- 2024 in Australian literature
