= Barbara Ramsden Award =

Australian literary award

The Barbara Ramsden Award was administered by Fellowship of Australian Writers and awarded annually to an author and editor in recognition of the efforts of both parties to produce a quality fiction or non-fiction book. The winners receive a memorial plaque. It was established in 1971 and was awarded annually until 1992. It was reestablished in 2006 with sponsorship from Society of Editors (Victoria) Inc. The award was named after Australian editor Barbara Ramsden (1903–1971). It was cancelled in 2016.

== Award winners ==
=== 1971 ===
- Michael Cannon (author) and Sue Ebury (editor) for Who's Master? Who's Man? (Nelson)

=== 1972 ===
- J. A. La Nauze (author) and Janet Mackenzie (editor) for The Making of the Australian Constitution (Melbourne University Press)

=== 1973 ===
- C. M. H. Clark (author) and Carol Bram (editor) for A History of Australia, Volume 3, (Melbourne University Press)
- Dorothy Green (author) and Shirley Purchase (editor) for Ulysses Bound : Henry Handel Richardson and Her Fiction (Australian National University Press

=== 1974 (joint winners) ===
- David Foster (author) and Lee White (editor) for The Pure Land (Macmillan)
- John Levi and G. F. J. Bergman (authors) and Michael Page (editor) for Australian Genesis: Jewish Convicts and Settlers, 1788–1850 (Rigby)
- Ronald McKie (author) and Robert Roseman (editor) for The Mango Tree (William Collins)

=== 1975 (joint winners) ===
- Geoffrey Blainey (author) and Lee White (editor) for Triumph of the Nomads (Macmillan)
- Thomas Keneally (author) and Philip Ziegler (editor) for Gossip from the Forest (Collins)
- Mary Rose Liverani (author) and Sue Ebury (editor) for The Winter Sparrows (Thomas Nelson)

=== 1977 ===
- Harry Gordon (author) and Jennifer Cunningham (editor) for An Eyewitness History of Australia (Rigby)

=== 1978 ===
- Alexander Turnbull Yarwood (author) and Carol Bram (editor) for Samuel Marsden: The Great Survivor (Melbourne University Press)

=== 1979 ===
- Manning Clark for A History of Australia, Volume IV (Melbourne University Press)

=== 1980 ===
- Oskar Spate (author) and Patricia Croft (editor) for The Spanish Lake, (Australian National University Press)

=== 1981 ===
- A. W. Martin (author) and Wendy Sutherland (editor) for Henry Parkes: A Biography (Melbourne University Press)

=== 1982 ===
- Gavin Souter (author) and Wendy Sutherland (editor) for Company of Heralds: A century and a half of Australian publishing by John Fairfax Limited and its predecessors, 1831–1981 (Melbourne University Press)

=== 1983 ===
- Rodney Hall (author) and Sally Moss (editor) for Just Relations (Penguin Australia)

=== 1984 ===
- Lloyd Robson for A History of Tasmania, Volume I (Oxford University Press)

=== 1985 (joint winners) ===
- Peter Carey (author) and Craig Munro (editor) for Illywhacker (University of Queensland Press)
- R. G. Geering (editor) for Ocean of Story : The Uncollected Stories of Christina Stead (Viking)

=== 1986 ===
- Elizabeth Jolley for The Well (Viking)

=== 1987 ===
- Jessica Anderson (author), Susan Hawthorne and Jackie Yowell (editors) for Stories from the Warm Zone and Sydney Stories (Penguin)

=== 1988 ===
- Mark Henshaw (author), Margit Meinhold and Jackie Yowell (editors) for Out of the Line of Fire (Text Publishing)

=== 1989 ===
- Amy Witting for I for Isobel (Penguin)

=== 1990 ===
- Gerald Murnane for Velvet Waters (McPhee Gribble)

=== 1991 ===
- Les Murray for Collected Poems (Farrar Straus and Giroux)

=== 1992 (joint winners) ===
- Alex Miller for The Ancestor Game (Penguin Australia)
- Gail Jones for The House of Breathing (Fremantle Press)

=== 2007 ===
- Donald Horne, Myfanwy Horne (authors) and Meredith Rose (editor) for Dying : A Memoir (Penguin)

=== 2008 ===
- Kim Kane (author) and Elise Jones (editor) for Pip : The Story of Olive (Allen and Unwin)

=== 2009 ===
- Alasdair McGregor (author) and Nicola Young (editor) for Grand Obsessions : The Life and Work of Walter Burley Griffin and Marion Mahony Griffin (Lantern)

=== 2010 ===
- Kristel Thornell (author) and Clara Finlay (editor) for Night Street (Allen and Unwin)

=== 2011 ===
- Jennifer Gall (editor) for In Bligh's Hand : Surviving the Mutiny on the Bounty (National Library of Australia)

=== 2012 ===
- Neil Grant (author) and Jodie Webster (editor) for The Ink Bridge (Allen and Unwin)

=== 2013 ===
- Felicity Volk (author) and Emma Rafferty (editor) for Lightning (Pan Macmillan)

=== 2014 ===
- Jenny Hocking (author) and Susan Keogh (editor) for Gough Whitlam : His Time, Volume 2 (Melbourne University Publishing)

=== 2015 ===
- Craig Munro (author) and Julia Carlomagno (editor) for Under Cover : Adventures in the Art of Editing (Scribe)
