= Rodney Hall (writer) =

English-born Australian writer

- Born: 18 November 1935 (age 90); Solihull, Warwickshire, England
- Occupations: Novelist and poet
- Writing career
- Language: English
- Years active: 1956-
- Notable works: Just Relations,The Grisly Wife
- Notable awards: Miles Franklin Award winner, 1982 Just Relations; 1994 The Grisly Wife

Rodney Hall AM (born 18 November 1935) is an Australian writer.

== Biography ==
Born in Solihull, Warwickshire, England, Hall came to Australia as a child after World War II and studied at the University of Queensland (1971). In the 1960s Hall began working as a freelance writer, and a book and film reviewer. He also worked as an actor, and was often engaged by the Australian Broadcasting Commission in Brisbane. Between 1967 and 1978 he was the Poetry Editor of The Australian. He began publishing poetry in the 1970s and has since published fourteen novels, including Just Relations and The Island in the Mind. He lived in Shanghai for a period in the late 1980s. From 1991 to 1994, he served as chair of the Australia Council.

Hall lives in Victoria. In addition to a number of literary awards such as twice winning the Miles Franklin Award, he was appointed a Member of Order of Australia for "service to the Arts, particularly in the field of literature" in 1990.

Hall's memoir Popeye Never Told You was launched in May 2010 and was published by Pier 9.

He was co-founder of the Australian Summer School of Early Music in Canberra. In June 2014 he staged Jacopo Peri's opera Euridice at the Woodend Winter Arts Festival.

== Awards ==
| The Miles Franklin Award | Just Relations, winner 1982 |
| | The Grisly Wife, winner 1994 |
| | Captivity Captive, shortlisted 1989 |
| | The Second Bridegroom, shortlisted 1992 |
| | The Day We Had Hitler Home, shortlisted 2001 |
| | Love Without Hope, shortlisted 2008 |
| | A Stolen Season, shortlisted 2019 |
| Victorian Premier's Literary Award | Captivity Captive, The Vance Palmer Prize for Fiction 1989 |
| The Age Book of the Year | The Island in the Mind, Fiction Prize shortlisted 1996 |
| | Vortex, Fiction Prize winner 2025 |
| Australian Literature Society Gold Medal | The Second Bridegroom, winner 1992 |
| | The Day We Had Hitler Home, winner 2001 |
| NBC Banjo Awards | Captivity Captive, NBC Banjo Award for Fiction, shortlisted 1989 |
| | The Grisly Wife, NBC Banjo Award for Fiction, shortlisted 1994 |
| | The Island in the Mind, NBC Banjo Award for Fiction, shortlisted 1997 |
| FAW Barbara Ramsden Award | Just Relations, Book of the Year winner 1982 |
| FAW ANA Literature Award | Just Relations, winner 1982 |
| Grace Leven Prize for Poetry | A Soapbox Omnibus, winner 1973 |
| Adelaide Festival Awards for Literature | A Stolen Season, shortlisted 2019 |

== Bibliography ==
=== Novels ===
- The Ship on the Coin: A Fable of the Bourgeoisie (1972)
- A Place Among People (1975)
- Just Relations (1982)
- Kisses of the Enemy (1987)
- Captivity Captive (1988) – third book in the Yandilli trilogy
- The Second Bridegroom (1991) – first book in the Yandilli trilogy
- The Grisly Wife (1993) – second book in the Yandilli trilogy
- The Island in the Mind (1996)
- The Day We Had Hitler Home (2000)
- The Last Love Story (2004)
- Love Without Hope (2007)
- A Stolen Season (2018)
- Vortex (2024)

=== Short fiction ===
Collections

- Silence (2011)

=== Poetry ===
Collections

- The Climber (1962)
- Penniless Till Doomsday (1962)
- Poems (1963)
- Forty Beads on a Hangman's Rope (1963)
- Eyewitness (1967)
- The Autobiography of a Gorgon (1968)
- The Law of Karma (1968)
- Australia (1970)
- Heaven, In a Way (1970)
- A Soapbox Omnibus (1973)
- Selected Poems (1975)
- Black Bagatelles (1978)
- Voyage Into Solitude (1978)
- The Most Beautiful World (1981)
- The Owner of My Face: New and Selected Poems (2002)

Anthologies (edited)

- New Impulses in Australian Poetry (1968) with Thomas Shapcott
- Australian Poetry 1970 (1970)
- Poems from Prison (1973)
- Australians Aware (1975) (a collection of poems and paintings)
- Voyage into Solitude (1978) (a collection of Michael Dransfield poetry)
- The Second Month of Spring (1980) (a collection of Michael Dransfield poetry)
- The Collins Book of Australian Poetry (1981)
- Michael Dransfield: Collected Poems (1987)

List of selected poems

| Title | Year | First published | Reprinted/collected |
|---|---|---|---|
| Youth — Manhood — Middle Age | 1965 | Hall, Rodney (March 1965). "Youth — Manhood — Middle Age". Meanjin Quarterly. 24 (1): 111. | |

=== Non-fiction ===
- Focus on Andrew Sibley (1968)
- J. S. Manifold: An Introduction to the Man and His Work (1978)
- Australia - Image of a Nation 1850-1950 (1983) (the text of a photographic collection)
- Home: Journey Through Australia (1988)
- Abolish the States! (1998)

Memoirs

- Popeye Never Told You (2010)
