= Love Without Hope =

2007 novel by Rodney Hall

- First edition
- Author: Rodney Hall
- Cover artist: Hieronymus Bosch, detail from The Garden of Earthly Delights c. 1500
- Language: English
- Genre: Novel
- Publisher: Picador, Australia
- Publication date: 2007
- Publication place: Australia
- Media type: Paperback
- Pages: 272 pp
- ISBN: 978-0-330-42288-8
- OCLC: 225447741
- Dewey Decimal: 823/.914 22
- LC Class: PR9619.3.H285 L68 2007

Love Without Hope is a 2007 novel by the Australian author Rodney Hall.

== Dedication ==
"For Julian Burnside"

== Epigraph ==
"You are not dying because you are ill. You are dying because you are alive." - Montaigne

== Awards and nominations ==
- Miles Franklin Literary Award, 2008: shortlisted
- Australia-Asia Literary Award, 2008: longlisted

== Reviews ==
- Bradley, James (February 17, 2007). "Love without Hope". The Age.
- Australian Book Review, vicnet.net.au
- The Sydney Morning Herald, smh.com.au
