= Annandale, New South Wales =

Annandale
- Suburb
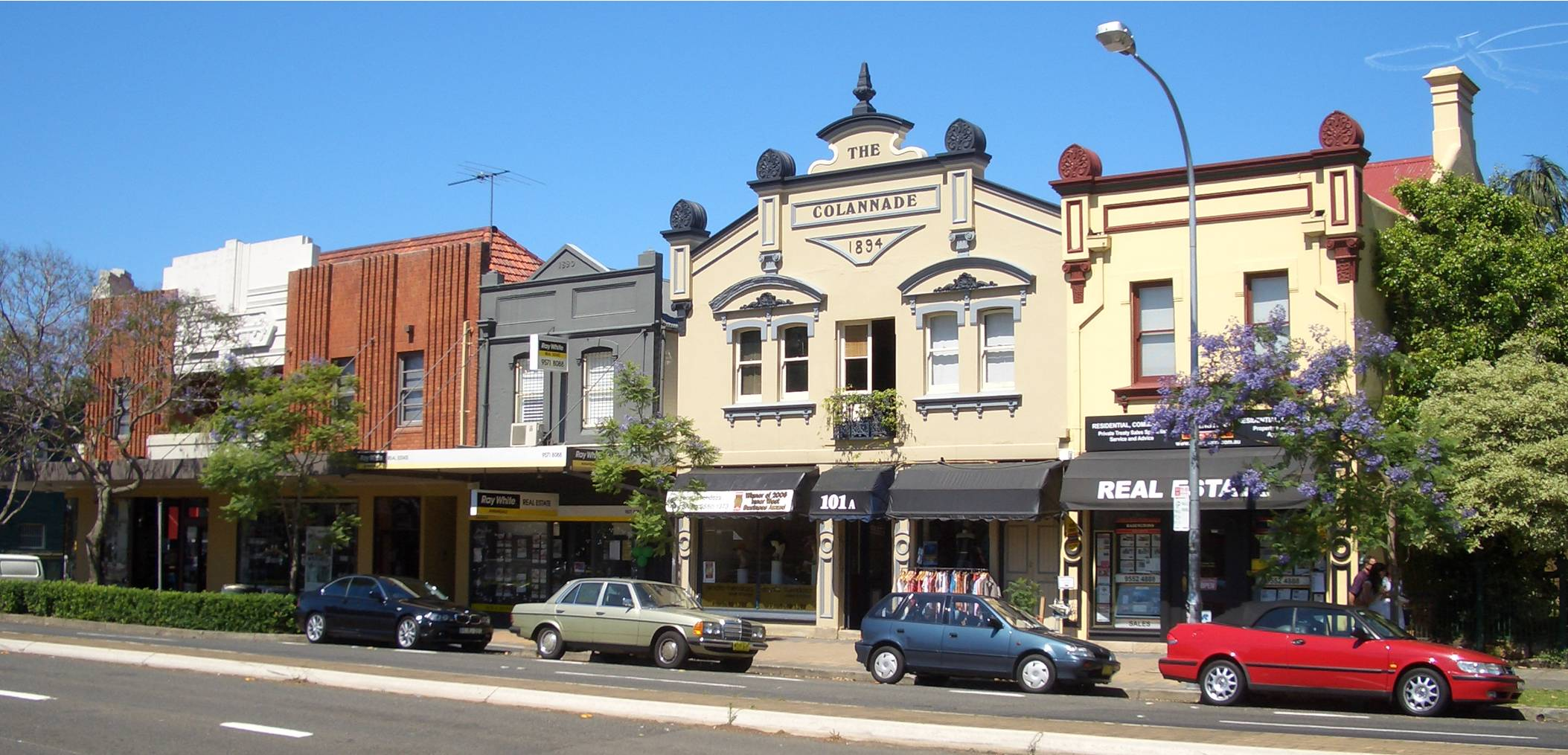
- Johnston Street

- Interactive map of Annandale
- Coordinates: 33°52′53″S 151°10′15″E
- Country: Australia
- State: New South Wales
- City: Sydney
- LGA: Inner West Council
- Location: 5 km (3.1 mi) west of Sydney CBD
- Established: 1823

Government
  - State electorate: Balmain
  - Federal divisions: Grayndler; Sydney

Area
  - Total: 1.49 km^{2} (0.58 sq mi)
- Elevation: 31 m (102 ft)

Population
  - Total: 9,487 (2021 census)
  - Density: 6,367/km^{2} (16,490/sq mi)
- Postcode: 2038
Suburbs around Annandale
Lilyfield	Rozelle
Leichhardt	Annandale	Glebe
Petersham	Stanmore	Camperdown

Annandale is a suburb in the Inner West of Sydney, in the state of New South Wales, Australia. Annandale is located within 5 kilometres west of the Sydney central business district and is part of the local government area of the Inner West Council. Annandale's northern end lies on Rozelle Bay, which is on Sydney Harbour. Glebe lies to its east, Lilyfield and Leichhardt to its west and Stanmore and Camperdown to its south.

== History ==
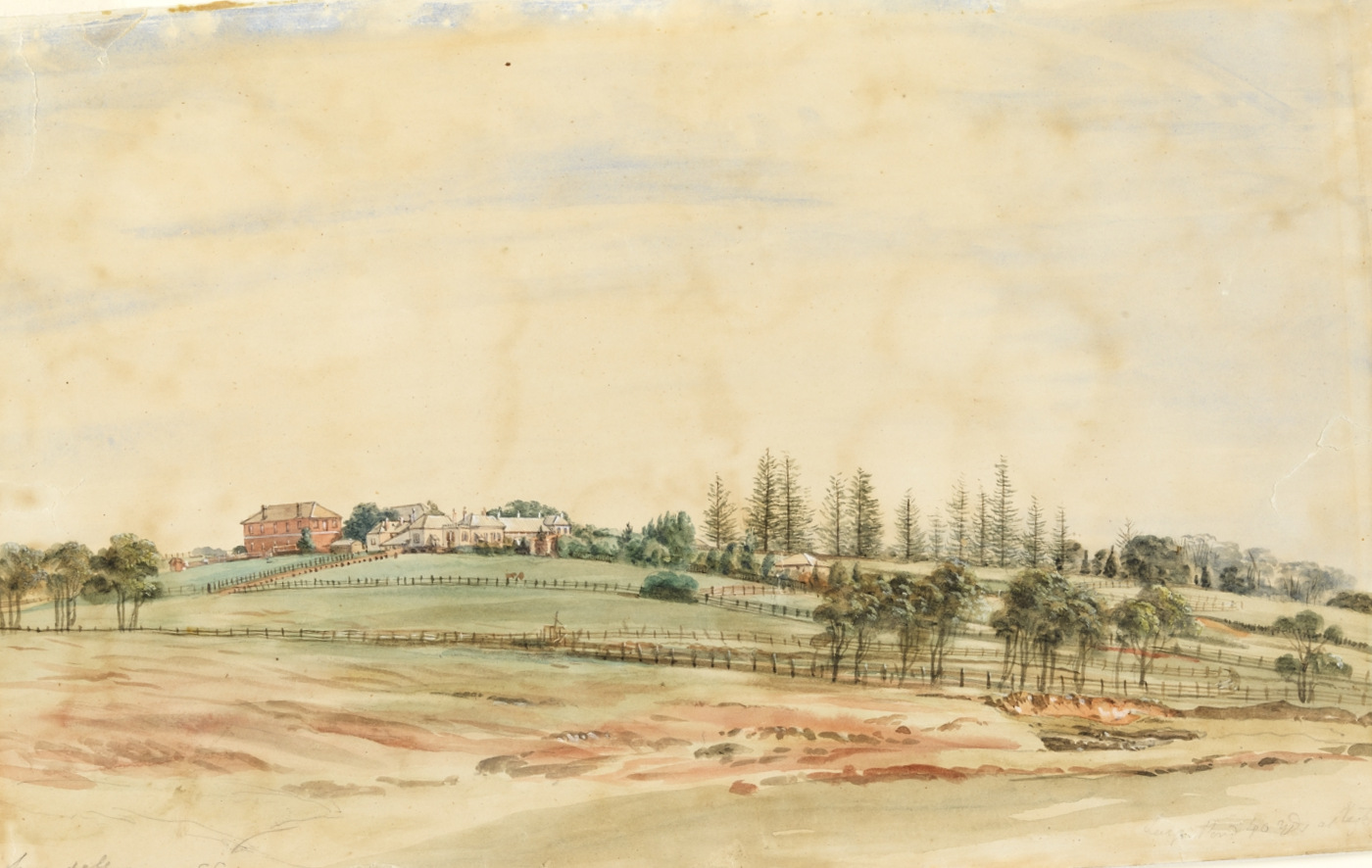
Annandale Farm

Major George Johnston (1764–1823) arrived on the First Fleet ship Lady Penrhyn, which brought convicts to Australia from England. He was granted 600 acres (2.4 km^{2}) of land in the area around Annandale and Stanmore, which became known as Johnston's Bush. He later renamed it Annandale after his birthplace Annan in Scotland, United Kingdom. His name is remembered in Johnston Street, Johnston Lane, Johnstons Creek and Johnstons Bay. Johnston and his wife Esther Abrahams, one of the convicts on the Lady Penrhyn, farmed the property with their children. They built a fine residence called Annandale House in 1799, some distance back from Parramatta Road. It was demolished in 1905, although the original gates were preserved and rebuilt on the grounds of Annandale Public school nearby on Johnston Street. George's son Robert inherited the estate, but in 1877 sold it to John Young, who was a businessman, architect and mayor.

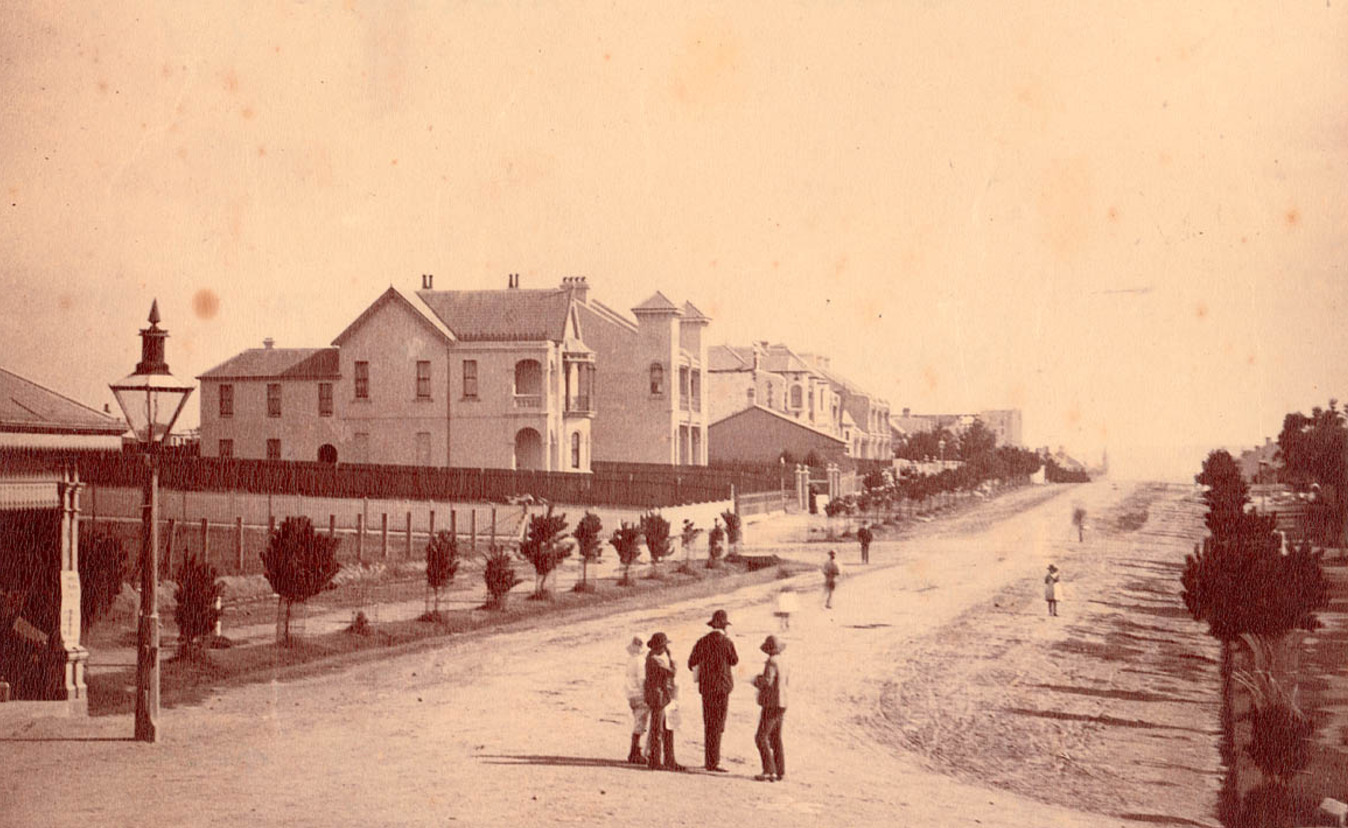
Large houses on Johnston Street, 1880s

Young began turning the Johnston estate into an attractive suburb by building a number of picturesque houses. One of those houses was Kenilworth, with a "witch's cap" style of roof common to that period of architecture, which Young rented to Henry Parkes, father of Federation and former Premier of NSW. Kenilworth was sold for $3.35 million in 2007. Other houses in the group were The Abbey, Oybin, Rozelle (now demolished), Greba, Hockingdon, Highroyd and Claremont (now demolished). Some of the houses are popularly known as "witches houses" because their towers resemble witches' hats. Highroyd was given a major restoration which took twenty years and was completed in 2009. The restoration was supervised by heritage architect David Springett and Highroyd was nominated for the heritage category of the Australian Institute of Architects New South Wales awards in 2009.

=== The Abbey ===
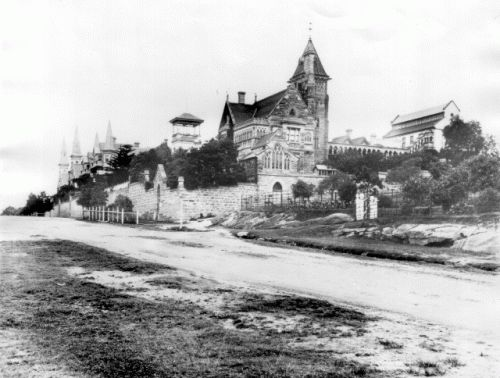
The Abbey, 1880s

Of the various houses in this group, The Abbey is the most notable. Built by John Young, The Abbey has been described as a stone Gothic Revival mansion, modelled on Scottish manors. Young gave his imagination a free rein and the house incorporates gables, arches, gargoyles, lions, quatrefoils, chimneys, turrets, a cloister and a tower with copper cladding (it was rumoured that Young may have stolen gargoyles from St Mary's Cathedral, which he built, but there was no proof). Young was the highest ranking Mason in Australia and The Abbey incorporates Masonic themes. It is possible that the building may have been used by Young as a Masonic Lodge. After Young's death, The Abbey was occupied by a series of tenants, who subdivided the house to create flats and flatettes.

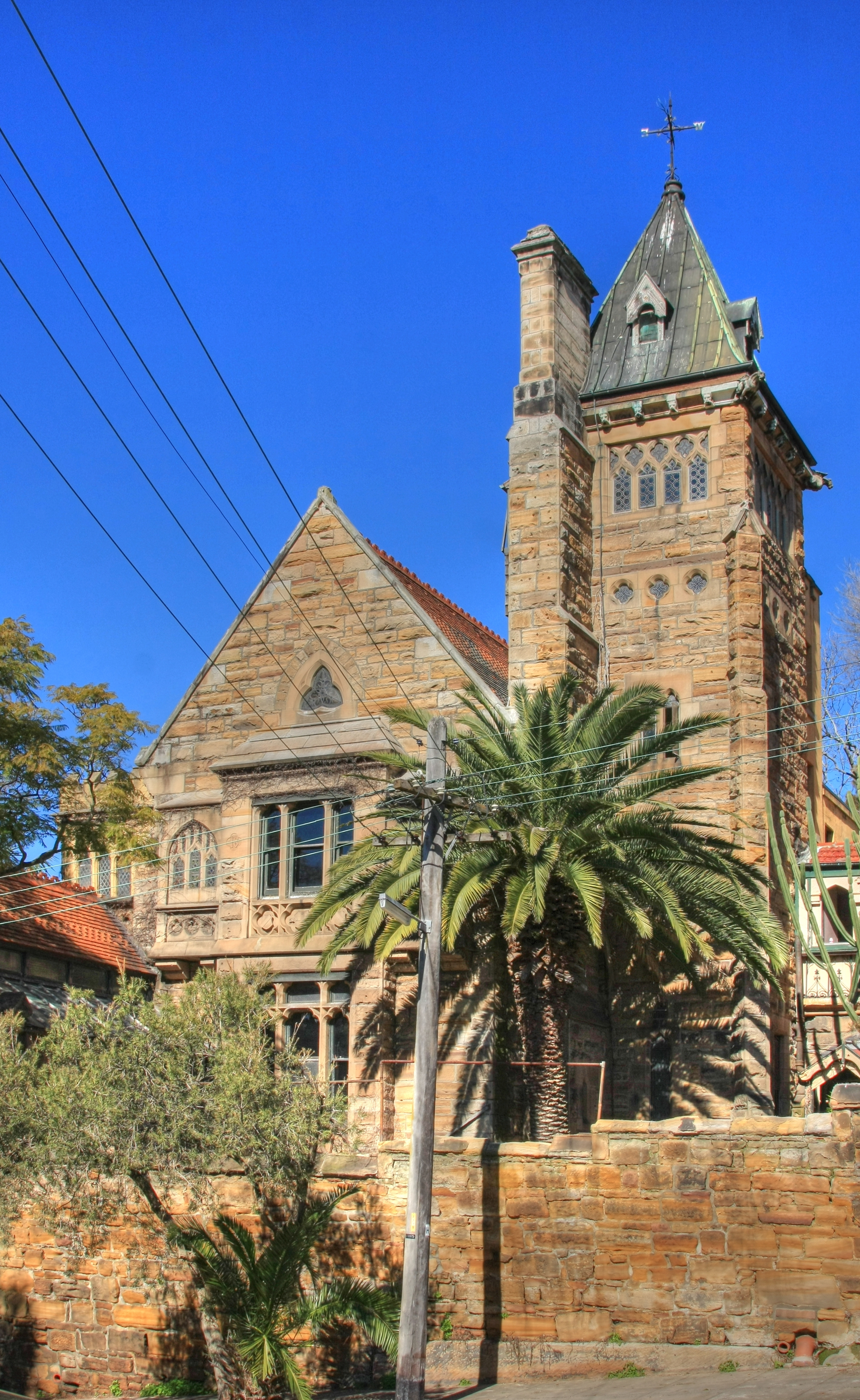
The Abbey

A new owner acquired the house in 1959 and restored it. It was listed on the (now defunct) Register of the National Estate. The house was sold for A$4.86 million on 7 November 2009, setting a record residential price for the Annandale area. The selling agent had been hoping for a price of A$5 million, but despite a crowd of 200 people attending the on-site auction, there were only two bidders. The auction itself took nearly an hour to complete, as one bidder regularly engaged in disputes with the auctioneer over the conduct of the auction.

=== Other developments ===
Another home in the area was Kentville, which was built as John Young's home, in a three hectares (seven acres) garden setting adjacent to Rozelle Bay. The land was bought by Young in 1877, and included a cottage built by Robert Johnston. Young enlarged the cottage and named it Kentville after his home county in the UK. He also built a bowling green on the land and opened it to the public.

Young hoped that the Annandale area would be fine enough to rival places like Darling Point, but was unable to prevent the growth of industries or the subdivision of lots. He died in 1907. The land was subdivided in the late part of the 19th century and more so after Young's death. Since then it has undergone a number of social transformations, from factory floors, migrant stop off, ageing population, to now young families and modern small and micro businesses.

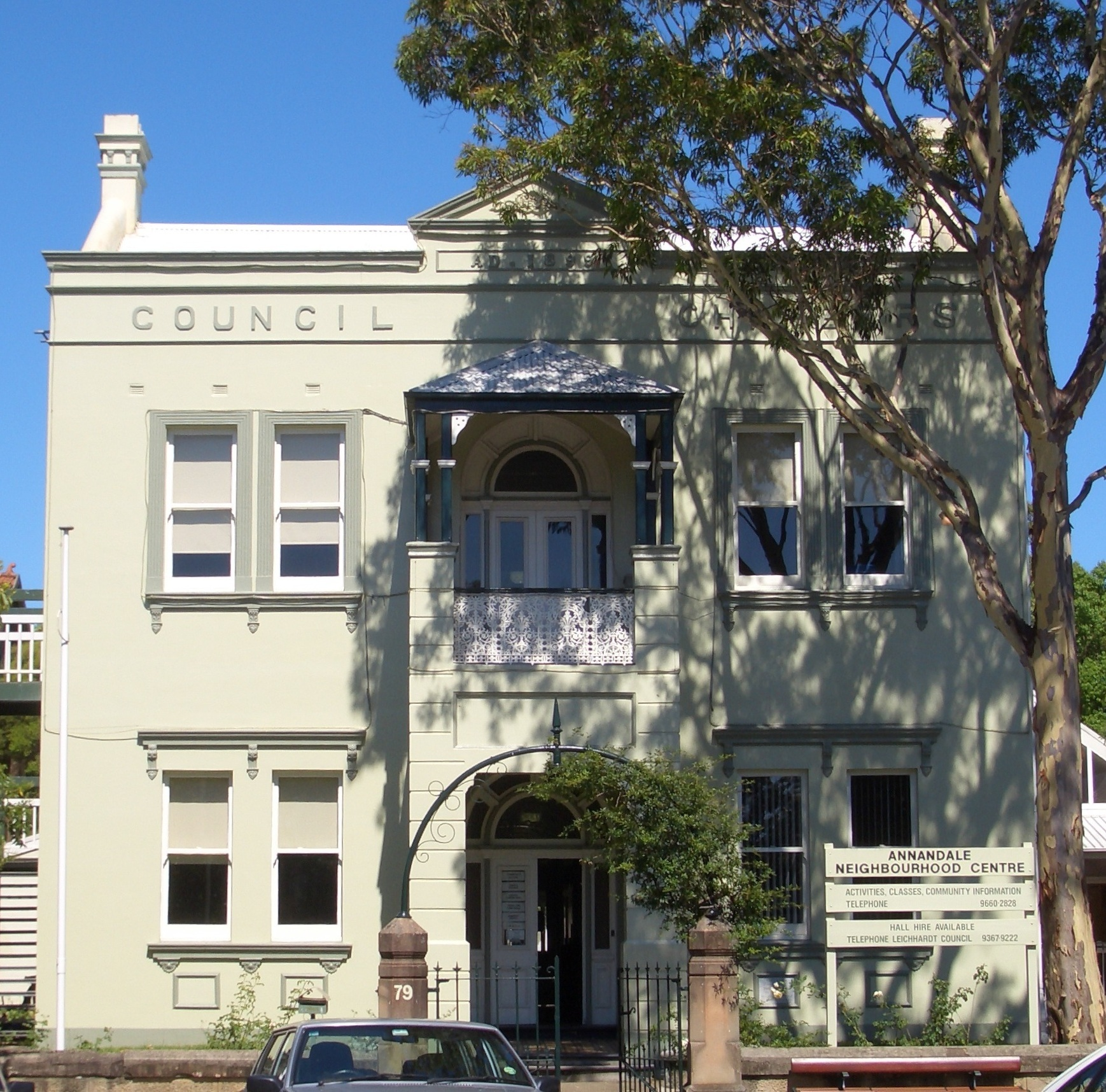
Annandale Council Chambers, circa 1899, designed by J.W.Richards

Young was an alderman on the Leichhardt Borough Council from 1879, and mayor that year and in 1884–85. Returning in 1891 from travels in Europe and Asia, Young led a secession movement resulting in the incorporation of the Annandale Borough Council. The Municipality of Annandale was incorporated on 2 January 1894 and merged into the Municipality of Leichhardt in 1949. The Annandale Council Chambers are now the home of the Annandale Neighbourhood Centre.

Johnston Street is also notable for being the first 30-metre-wide (98 ft) street in Sydney.

=== Heritage ===
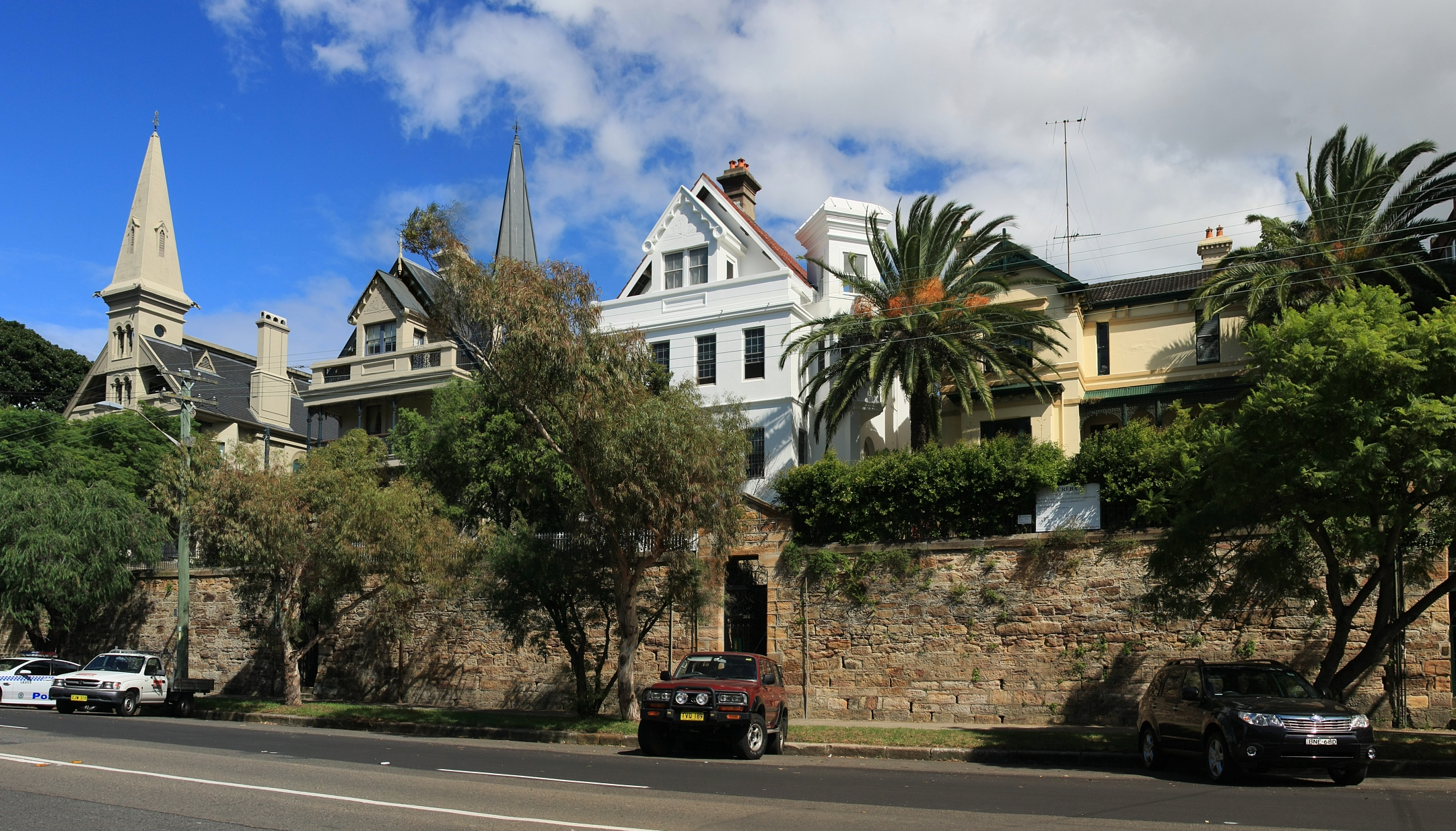
Four Gothic houses of the Johnston Street group: Kenilworth, Highroyd, Hockindon and Greba

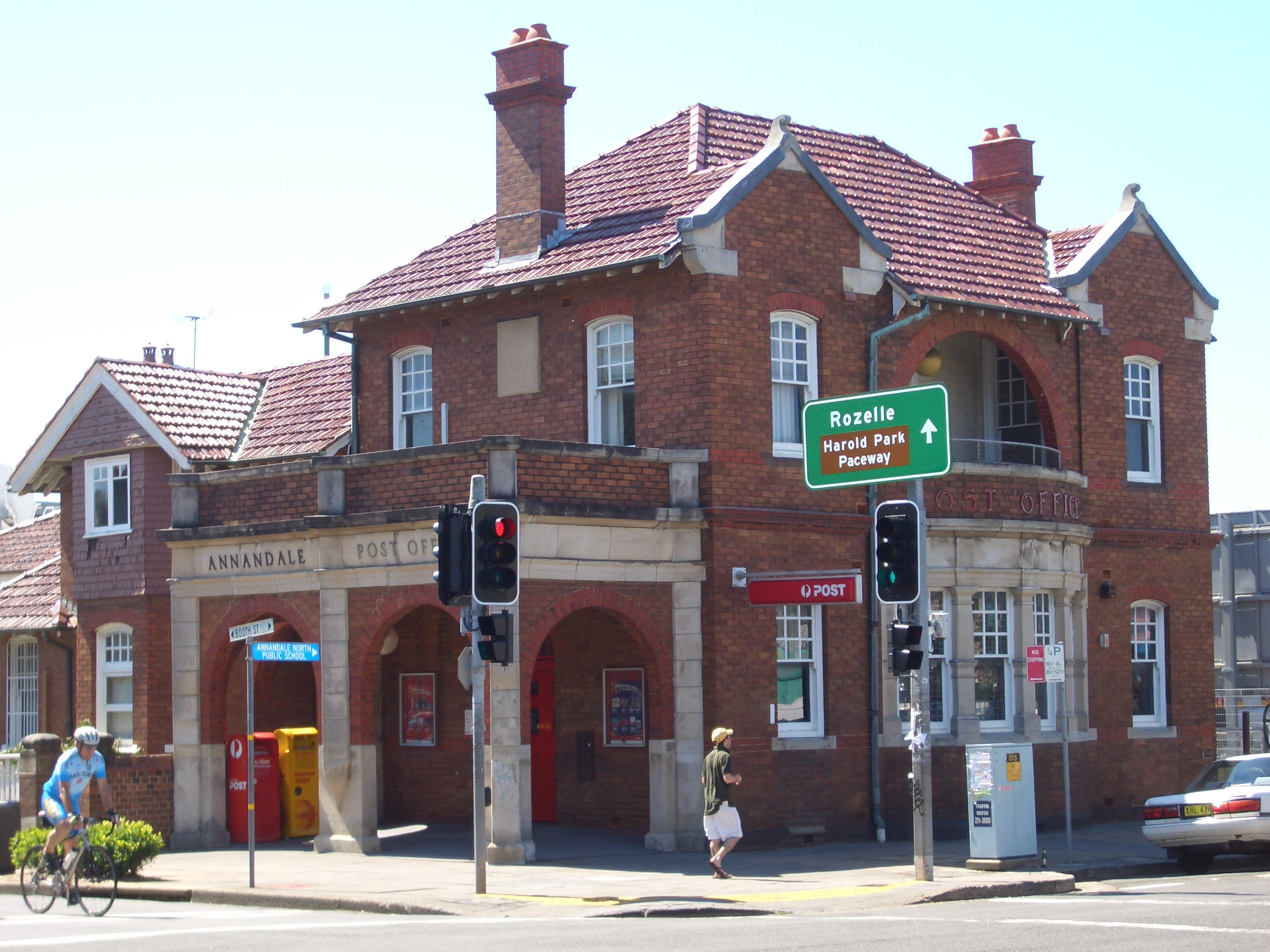
Annandale Post Office

Annandale has a number of heritage-listed sites, including:

- Johnston Street: Hunter Baillie Memorial Presbyterian Church
- 2-12 Johnston Street: Goodman's Buildings
- 182 Johnston Street: Substation No. 15
- off Taylor Street, Hogan Park: Johnston's Creek Sewer Aqueduct
- Booth Street: Sewage Pumping Station 3

Other significant historic buildings include:

- Annandale Council Chambers, 79 Johnston Street, constructed in 1899.
- Annandale North Public School, Johnston Street
- Annandale Post Office, Johnston Street, an example of the Federation Free Classical style.
- Annandale Public School, Johnston Street
- North's Factory, 43 Trafalgar Street, the former Beale Piano Factory, the first and largest Australian piano manufacturer.
- The Abbey and stone walls, Johnston Street
- Uniting Church (former Methodist Church), 81A Johnston Street
- Victorian semi-detached villas, 13-15 Collins Street
- Hillcrest, a freestanding Victorian home on the Northern end Nelson St

The Annandale Heritage Festival takes place each year during Australian Heritage Week in April.

== Demographics ==
According to the 2021 census, there were 9,487 people living in Annandale. 69.0% were born in Australia. The next most common countries of birth were England 5.1%, New Zealand 2.6%, United States of America 1.4% and China 0.9%. 80.9% of people only spoke English at home. Other languages spoken at home included Italian 1.5%, Spanish 1.3%, Mandarin 1.3%, Greek 1.1% and Cantonese 0.7%. The most common responses for religious affiliation were No Religion 53.2%, Catholic 18.7%, Anglican 7.5%, Not stated 7.1% and Eastern Orthodox 2.5%.

== Schools ==
- Annandale Public School at 25-31 Johnston Street and Annandale North Public School at 206 Johnston Street are both on the Register of the National Estate.
- St Brendan's Catholic School is at 34 Collins Street.

== Churches ==
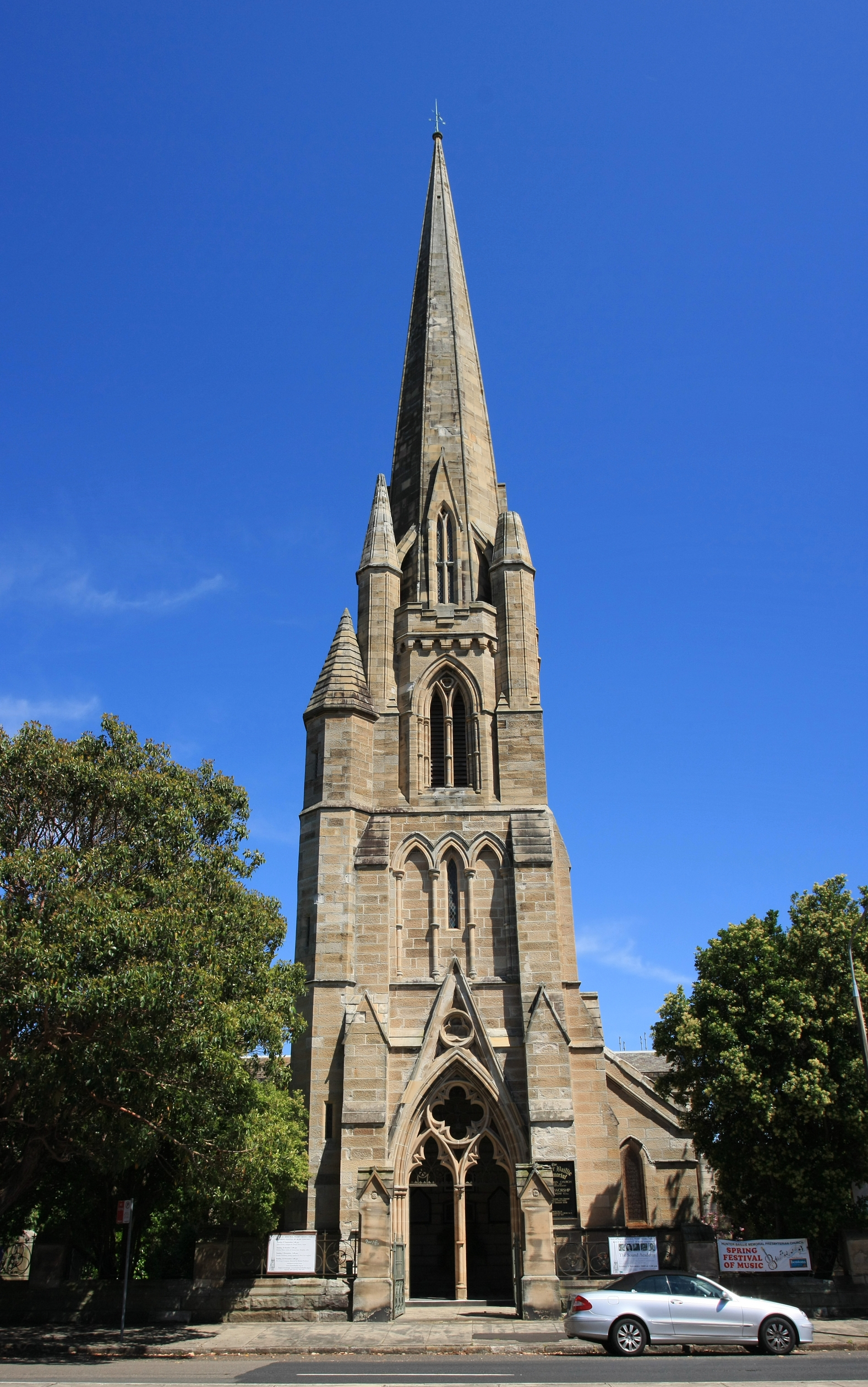
Hunter Baillie Memorial Presbyterian Church, designed by Cyril and Arthur Blacket (listed on the New South Wales State Heritage Register and on the (now defunct) Register of the National Estate).

- Village Church, Annandale (Anglican), Johnston Street
- Hunter Baillie Memorial Presbyterian Church, Johnston Street
- St Brendan's Catholic Church, Johnston Street
- Annandale Uniting Church, Johnston Street

== Culture ==
=== Environment ===
Annandale is bound by Johnston Creek in the east, White's Creek in the west, and Sydney Harbour to the north.

Eco-Annandale Exhibition

The Eco-Annandale exhibition has been run annually since 2009. Each year, the group exhibition focuses on an aspect of Ecological Sustainability.

Footprints EcoFestival

Until 2024 the Footprints EcoFestival was run annually, in White's Creek Valley. The first year it was run on World Environment Day (in 2010), however a storm caused its relocation to the Leichhardt Town Hall. The festival was held in August. In 2025 the Inner West Council decided to pause the festival for a year to prepare its relocation to the Inner West Sustainability Hub in Summer Hill in 2026.

=== Sport ===
- A Rugby League team representing the suburb played in the NSWRL Premiership competition between 1910 and 1920.
- Amy Hudson, an allrounder who captained the Annandale Warratahs (Women's Cricket) went on to play for Australia and Tour England.

=== Music ===
- The Annandale Hotel is a popular live music venue for rock/indie bands. Live At The Annandale is an album recorded at the Annandale Hotel by American punk rock band The Bronx. Isis released a DVD of their full performance at the Annandale Hotel from 2005.
- Trafalgar Studios was where many influential bands of the 70-80s in Sydney recorded their albums at 74b Trafalgar Street. Artists who recorded here included Cold Chisel, Radio Birdman, INXS, Died Pretty, Midnight Oil, Paul Kelly and The Cockroaches. Trafalgar Studios later became Electric Avenue, then home to Christian music label Emu Music. In August 2008 the property was offered for sale. Plans for demolition of the studio were put to council in June 2010 and are facing community opposition. The studios were eventually demolished in 2018.
- Australian music label Didgeridoo Records was located in Annandale.
- The band Sparkadia originated from Annandale.
- Cold Chisel guitarist Ian Moss lives in Annandale.
- Annual Hunter Baillie Spring Festival of Music was established in 1994 to raise funds for the restoration of the 1890 Hill & Son organ
- Sydney's 5 Seconds of Summer pop rock band played their first gig at The Annandale Hotel.

=== Pop culture ===
- American author, Mark Twain, stayed in Johnston Street, in the home of Sir Henry Parkes toward the end of Parkes' life, according to Bill Bryson in his Down Under book.
- Booth Street, one of the main streets of the suburb, is a song by popular local band Youth Group on their debut album Urban and Eastern (2000).
- Sydney band Seventeen (featuring members of Smudge and 2 Litre Dolby) have a song called Annandale on their 1999 album Gaggin For It.

== Transport ==
Buses are the primary mode of public transport in Annandale. The major bus corridor is along Booth St, through the middle of the suburb. This corridor is served by the 470 (operating between Lilyfield and the city) and the 469 (between Leichhardt and Glebe). A large number of bus routes (413, 436, 438, L38, 439, L39, 440, 461, 480 and 483) operate along Parramatta Road at the southern border of the suburb. These all service the city. In the north east of the suburb, the 433 operates along The Crescent between the city and Balmain.

The Rozelle Bay stop on the Inner West Light Rail of Sydney's light rail network is located in the north of the suburb. The Jubilee Park stop is also accessible from Annandale. Trams operate to east to Central railway station via Pyrmont, and south-west to Dulwich Hill.

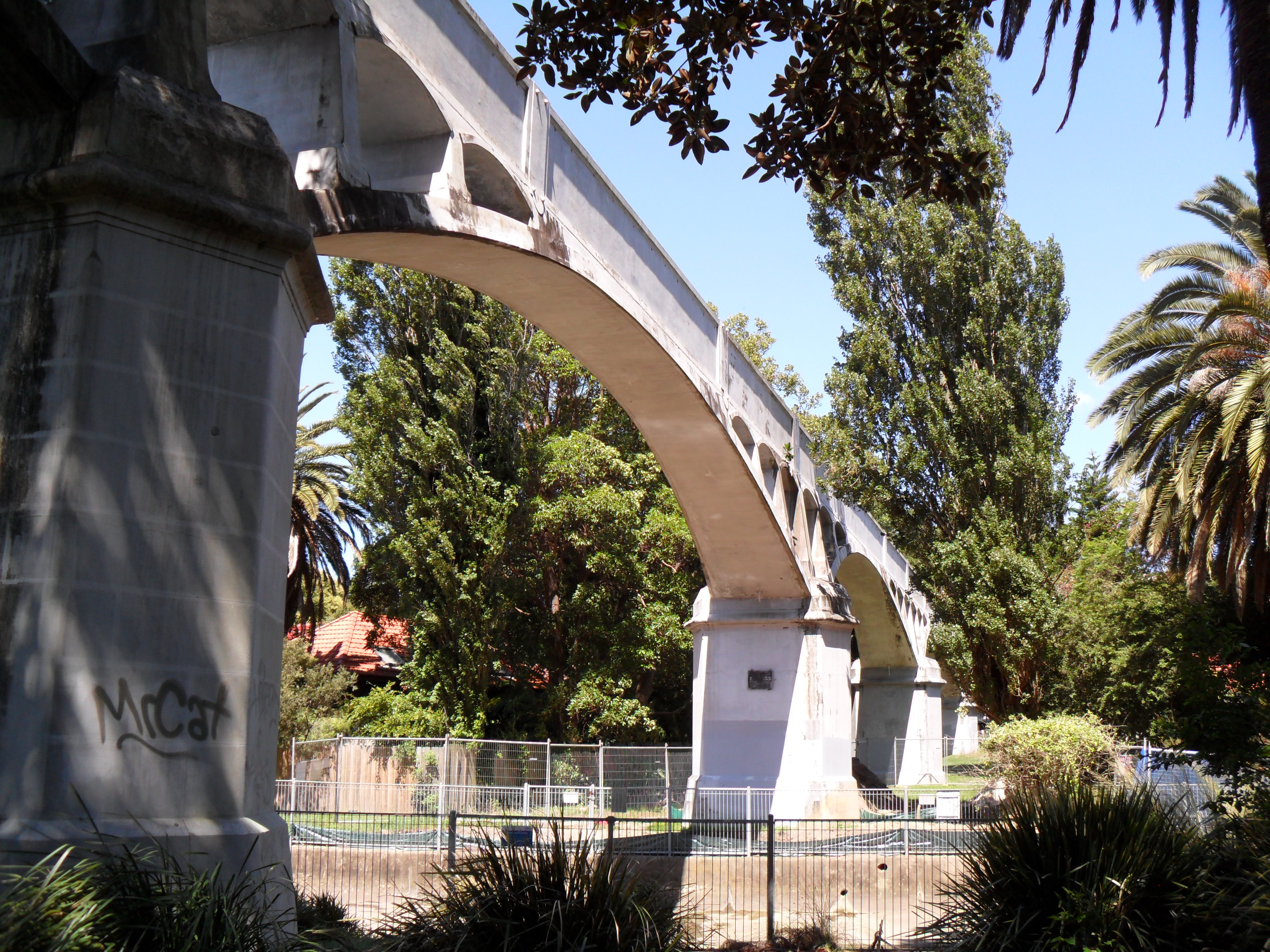
Aqueduct across Johnstons Creek at Hogan Park

== Notable residents ==
- Sid Barnes, cricketer
- Claudia Chan Shaw, born in Annandale, fashion designer
- Fred Cress, painter, had a studio in Annandale
- Ross Edwards, composer
- Dick Ellis, soldier and intelligence officer
- Ezzie Fenston, journalist
- Isabel Flick, Aboriginal rights activist
- Thelma Forshaw, writer, journalist – grew up in Annandale
- Belle Golding, feminist, suffragist and labor activist
- Douglas Grant, Australian Aboriginal draftsman, soldier, POW and raconteur
- Amy Hudson, cricketer (see above)
- Kim Moyes, member of The Presets, has a studio in Annandale
- Robert Johnston, naval officer
- Ian Moss, singer-songwriter and guitarist
- Henry Parkes, 'Father of Federation' and 7th Premier of New South Wales died in Annandale
- Barbara Ramsden, book editor at Melbourne University Press
- Craig Reucassel, comedian and member of The Chaser
- Abe Saffron, nightclub owner and property developer was born in Annandale
- John Stanley, 2GB radio broadcaster
- Allen Taylor, mayor of Annandale, Lord Mayor of Sydney, MLC, Timber & Shipping Merchant
- Eric Wilson, Australian painter
- John Young, businessman, architect, builder and mayor
