= Goodman's Buildings =

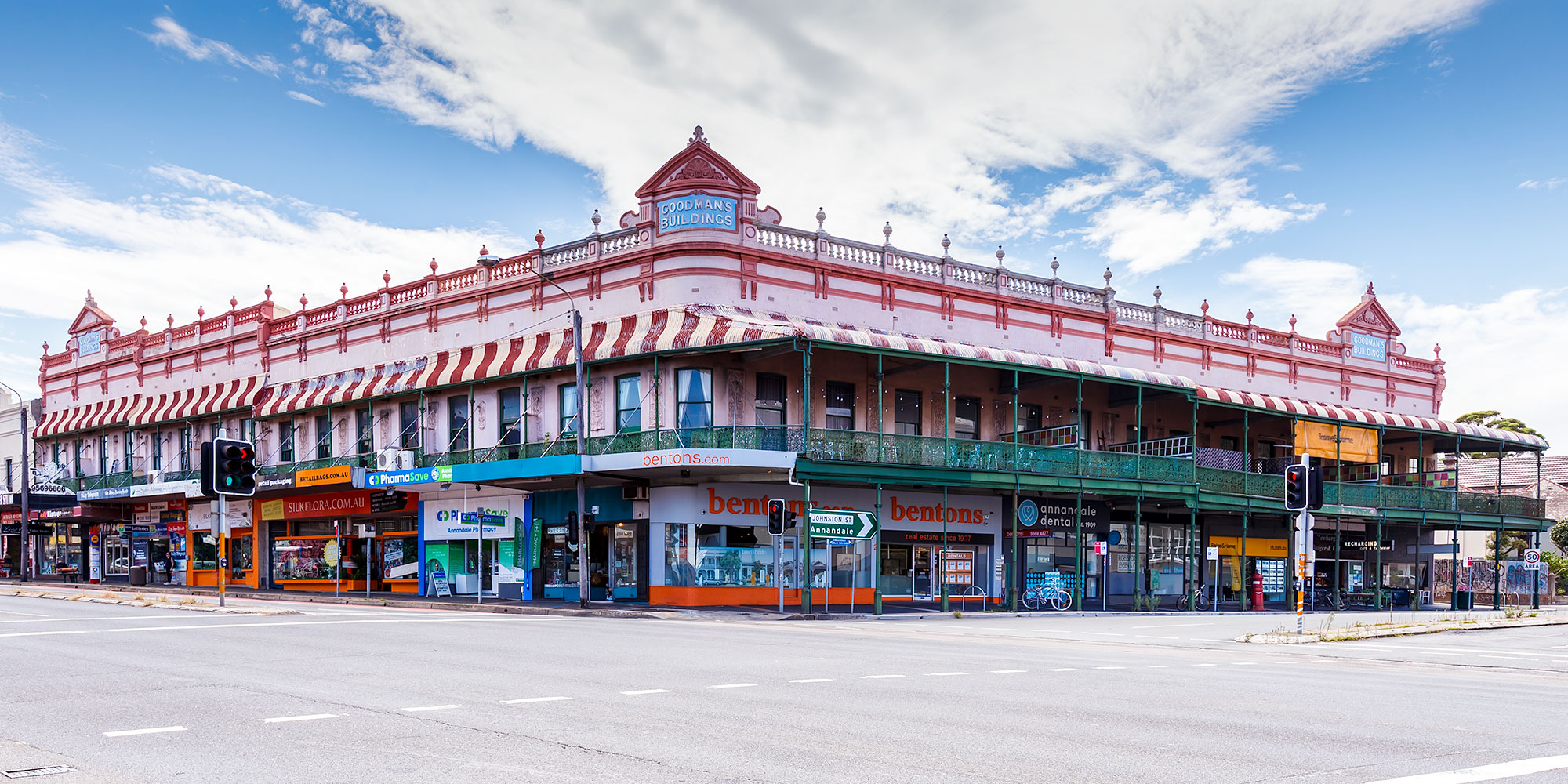
- Goodman's Buildings, 2019

- Location within Sydney Location within Australia
- 33.8876°S 151.1674°E
- Location: 2-12 Johnston Street, Annandale, Inner West Council, Sydney, New South Wales, Australia

Site notes
- Architectural style: Filigree style

New South Wales Heritage Register
- Official name: Goodman's Buildings
- Type: state heritage (built)
- Designated: 2 April 1999
- Reference no.: 672
- Type: Shop
- Category: Retail and Wholesale

Goodman's Buildings is a heritage-listed retail building in Sydney located at 2-12 Johnston Street, Annandale, New South Wales, Australia. It was added to the New South Wales State Heritage Register on 2 April 1999.

== History ==
Annandale was intended to be a "model township." The developer, John Young, created the 100 feet (30 m) wide boulevard along the main ridge, Johnston Street, which was intended to be the finest street in the Colony and encouraged the symmetrical street grid pattern. Walter Goodman, a local shoe merchant and entrepreneur, chose the site to construct a large emporium. Designed by prominent architects Sheerin and Hennessy, the building was built in stages between 1890 and 1912. The stepped elements in the building facades give some indication of the staged construction, with the Johnston Street frontage and corner being part of the first stage. Upon completion of the building, Mr. Goodman occupied a grand apartment on the first floor and leased out his ground floor shops.

In the late 1980s the NSW Department of Planning co-ordinated the restoration of the exterior of the building as part of a scheme to improve the Parramatta Road streetscape. The works at this time included the repair of the verandah structures, essential repairs and painting of the buildings’ exterior. Paint scrapes were undertaken to determine the earlier colours which were found in the Pascol Paint range. Pascol donated over 700 litres of paint to complete the project. It would appear that a number of changes have been carried out, particularly to the rear of the buildings. The building is now occupied by a number of separate owners and tenants.

== Description ==
Goodman's Buildings is a two-storey rendered brick commercial and residential building with Victorian Filigree details, high parapet and façade which curves around the Parramatta Road and Johnston Street corner. The building houses thirteen separate shops and residences above with renovated shopfronts on the ground floor with suspended awnings and narrow balconies over on the Parramatta Road frontage and wide posted balconies along the Johnston Street frontage. The first floor balconies all feature cast iron lace balustrade and posts which support the corrugated iron roof (ogee profile). Large double hung timber framed windows are regularly spaced along the first floor facades topped by rendered cornice and mouldings and bayed parapet with moulded cement balustrade and decorative urns at the end of each bay. A pediment bearing the name of the building is located at the western end of the Parramatta Road façade, corner and northern end of the Johnston Street façade. The façades and parapet conceal the skillion roof forms and rear wings which extend back to Albion Lane.

== Significance ==
The Goodman's Buildings are of high historic, aesthetic and social significance as a relatively rare example of a grand emporium style building constructed in the inner city from 1890. The building is a largely intact example of a Victorian styled building constructed from 1890 that retains its overall scale, character and details particularly the first floor balconies and distinctive parapet and pediments. The building occupies a prominent corner site and has landmark qualities and makes a positive contribution to this part of the Parramatta Road and Johnston Street streetscapes.

== Heritage listing ==
Goodman's Buildings was listed on the New South Wales State Heritage Register on 2 April 1999.
