= Substation No. 15 =

Historical electrical substation in Sydney, Australia

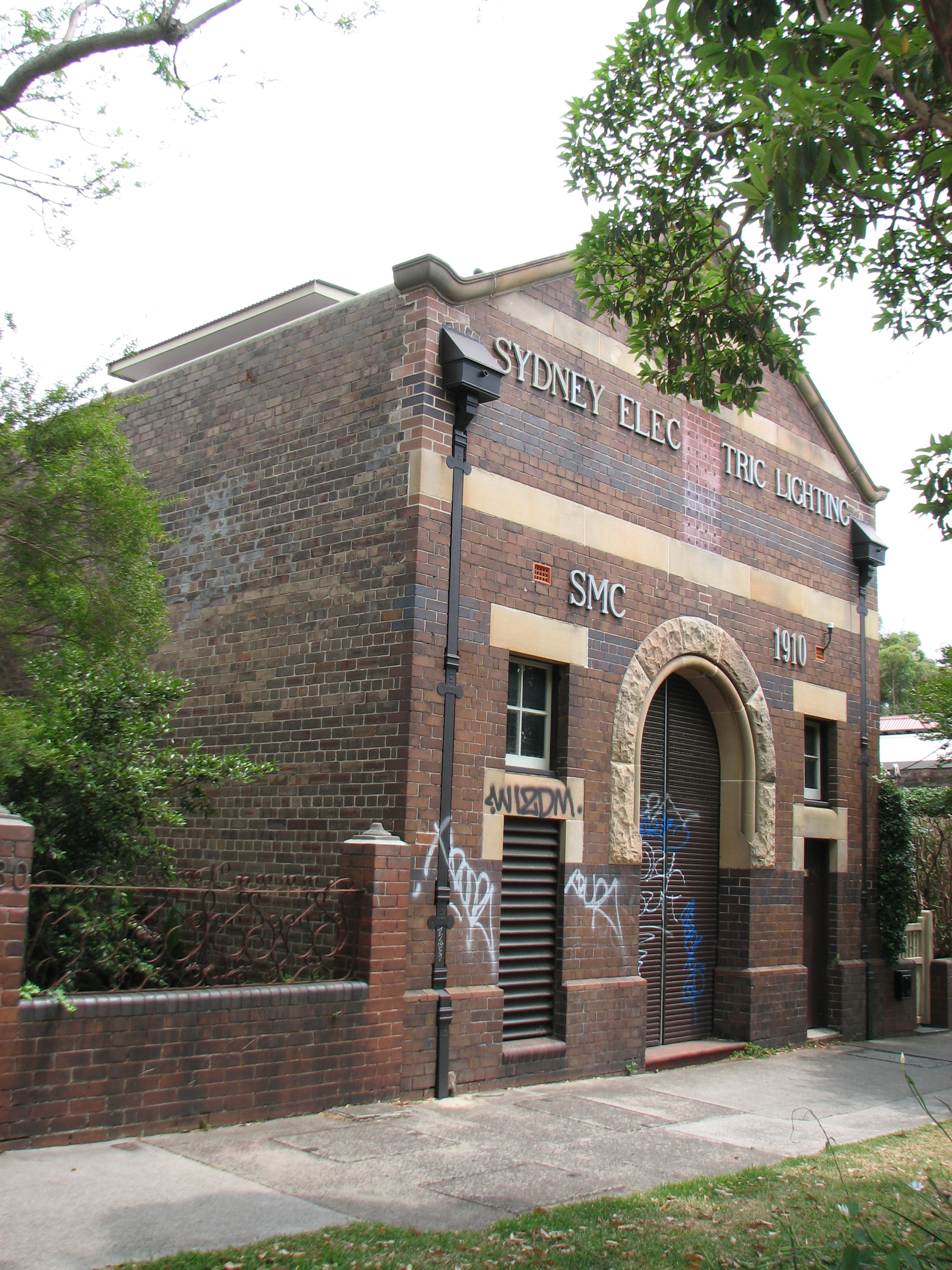
- Substation No. 15, 182 Johnston Street, Annandale, New South Wales

- Location within Sydney Location within Australia
- 33.8789°S 151.1716°E
- Location: 182 Johnston Street, Annandale, Inner West Council, Sydney, New South Wales, Australia

History
- Built: 1910

Site notes
- Owner: Ausgrid

New South Wales Heritage Register
- Official name: Substation; #15 Johnston Street Substation
- Type: state heritage (built)
- Designated: 2 April 1999
- Reference no.: 941
- Type: Electricity Transformer/Substation
- Category: Utilities - Electricity

Substation No. 15 is a heritage-listed electrical substation at 182 Johnston Street, Annandale, Inner West Council, Sydney, New South Wales, Australia. It was built in 1910. The property is owned by Ausgrid. It was added to the New South Wales State Heritage Register on 2 April 1999.

== History ==
Substation No. 15 is a purpose designed and built structure dating from 1910. It is the second-oldest substation in the Ausgrid network, was the first substation in Annandale, and though once common, is the last of its design still in operation.

The building underwent restoration in 2013.

== Description ==
Substation No. 15 is an impressively detailed face brick and sandstone double height building designed in the Federation Freestyle. Decorative and stylistic features include a rusticated and moulded sandstone arch surrounding the central doorway, an unusual moulded sandstone gable parapet, contrasting banded brickwork, a patterned brick infill panel, and sandstone intels above doorways, windows and vents.

The substation is constructed in contrasting banded brickwork with sandstone banding, gable-parapet and lintels. A rusticated sandstone arch surrounds the main roller-shutter steel doorway.

The words "Sydney ELECTRIC LIGHTING" and "SMC 1910" appear on the facade mounted as single letters.

It was reported to be in good condition as at 8 November 2000.

== Heritage listing ==
Substation No. 15 is an unusual, rare and representative example of a purpose designed structure. Built in the early 20th century, it has an elaborate, well detailed Federation Freestyle facade. The building is of State Significance. The building is located within the Annandale Urban conservation area as listed by the National Trust.

Substation No. 15 was listed on the New South Wales State Heritage Register on 2 April 1999.
