= Sewage Pumping Station 3 =

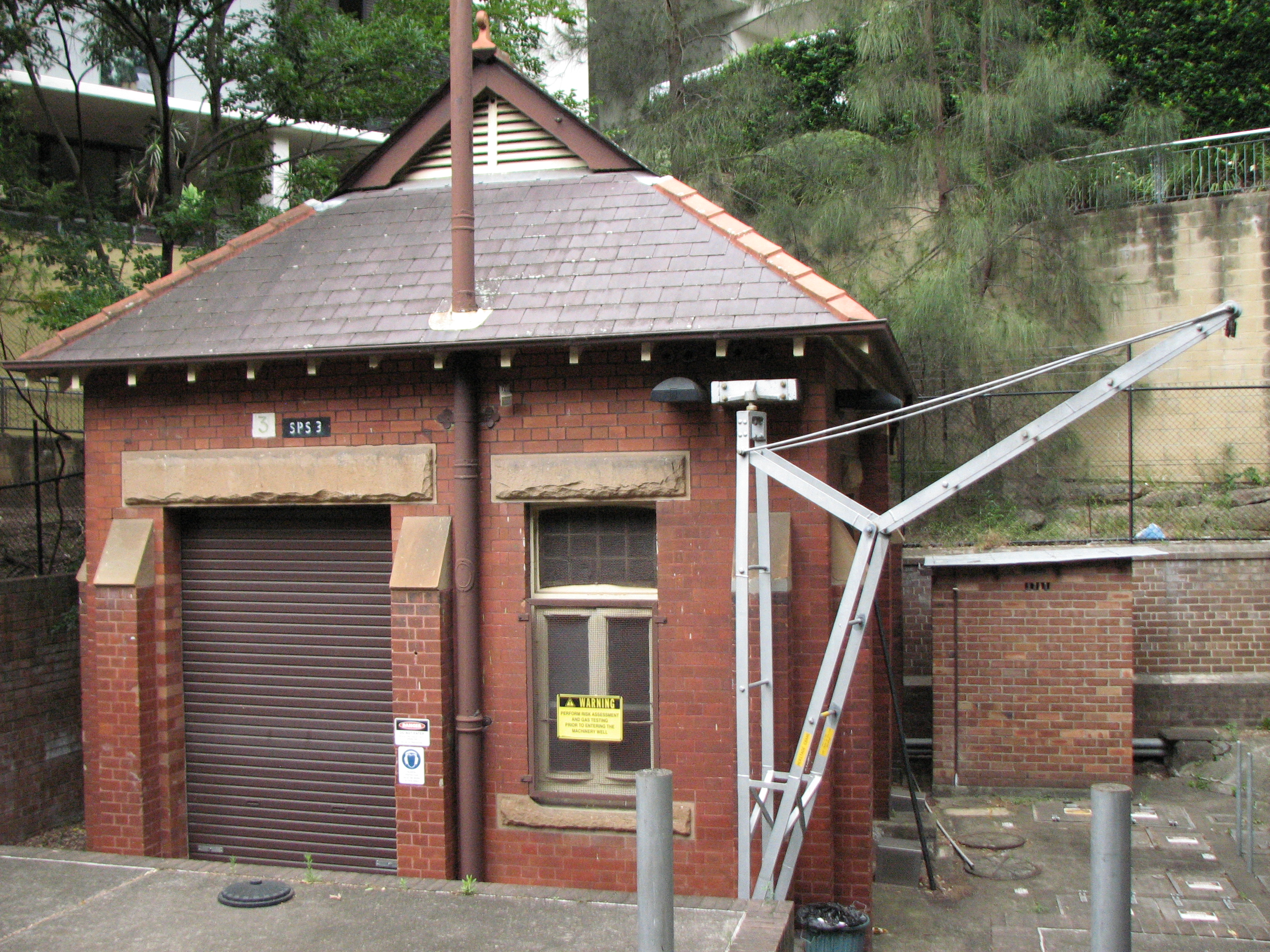
- Sewage Pumping Station 3, Booth Street, Annandale, New South Wales

- Location within New South Wales Location within Australia
- 33.8834°S 151.1758°E
- Location: Booth Street, Annandale, City of Sydney, New South Wales, Australia

History
- Built: 1902–1904

Site notes
- Architect: New South Wales Public Works Department
- Owner: Sydney Water

New South Wales Heritage Register
- Official name: Sewage Pumping Station 3; SPS 3; SP0003; Booth Street Sewage Pumping Station; Annandale Sewage Pumping Station
- Type: state heritage (built)
- Designated: 18 November 1999
- Reference no.: 1343
- Type: Sewage Pump House/Pumping Station
- Category: Utilities - Sewerage
- Builders: New South Wales Public Works Department

Sewage Pumping Station 3 is a heritage-listed sewerage pumping station located near 1 Booth Street, Annandale, City of Sydney, New South Wales, Australia. The building is located adjacent to Johnstons Creek. It was built from 1902 to 1904 by the New South Wales Public Works Department. It is also known as SPS 3, SP0003, Booth Street Sewage Pumping Station and Annandale Sewage Pumping Station. The property is owned by Sydney Water. It was added to the New South Wales State Heritage Register on 18 November 1999.

== History ==
In 1859 Sydney's sewerage system consisted of five outfall sewers which drained to Sydney Harbour. By the 1870s, the harbour had become grossly polluted (especially with the nearby abattoir at Glebe island) and there were outbreaks of typhoid fever throughout the period 1870s - 1890s. As a result, the Government of New South Wales created the Sydney City and Suburban Health Board to investigate an alternative means of disposing of the city's sewage.

This led to the construction of two gravitation sewers in 1889 by the Public Works Department: a northern sewer being the Bondi Ocean Outfall Sewer and a southern sewer draining to a sewage farm at Botany Bay. Low-lying areas around the harbour which could not gravitate to the new outfall sewers continued to drain to the old City Council Harbour sewers. Low level pumping stations were therefore needed to collect the sewage from such areas and pump it by means of additional sewers known as rising mains, to the main gravitation system.

The first comprehensive low level sewerage system began at the beginning of the 20th century when the Public Works Department built a group of 20 low level pumping stations around the foreshores of the inner harbour and handed them over to the Metropolitan Board of Water Supply and Sewerage in 1904, of which this is one. Overall, greater Sydney now has over 600 low level sewage pumping stations.

== Description ==
SP0003 is a low level sewage pumping station located adjacent to the Johnstons Creek stormwater channel in Annandale. It consists of two distinct parts: a superstructure comprising a rectangular single-storey loadbearing brick building, and a substructure constructed of concrete which houses machinery and sewage chambers. Architecturally, the building was designed in a utilitarian version of the Federation Queen Anne style.

Externally there is a corrugated iron gambrel roof with timber louvered gable vents and exposed eaves with timber sarking boards; double casement timber windows with multi paned fanlights; dark red-brown tuck pointed brickwork laid in English bond with a splayed brick plinth and engaged brick piers capped with rubbed sandstone; rock faced sandstone sills and lintels; quadrant eaves gutters with galvanised steel and cast iron downpipe.

Internally, the ceiling is lined with tongue and grooved boarding and walls are rendered and lined out to simulate ashlar coursing. The substructure is divided into a machinery well comprising two vertical spindle centrifugal pumps, each direct coupled to electric motors. Adjacent are two sewage wells and an inlet well. The walls are finished to match the superstructure. External to the building is an original wall mounted lifting crane. The station is not visible from public areas.

It is reasonably intact with reversible alterations. It is the only first-generation station which has its original lifting crane intact. The original timber gates are intact. The slate roof has been replaced. Timber double doors were replaced with a roller shutter. The original plunger pumps plus the DC current were replaced before 1913. Most of the mechanical and electrical components were upgraded during the 1970s.

== Heritage listing ==
SP0003 is of historic, aesthetic and technical/research significance. Historically it was part of an original network of twenty low level sewage pumping stations constructed at the end of the 19th century. The station along with the construction of the Southern Outfall Sewer (ten years earlier) formed a part of the major advance in the protection of the public health of Sydney by ending the discharge of sewage into the harbour. They were built as a direct response to the outbreaks of Enteric Fever (Typhoid) which plagued Sydney from the 1870s to 1890s and the recommendations of the Sydney City and Suburban Health Board (which was established by the government in 1875 to report on the best means of sewage disposal) which proposed the establishment of outfall sewers.

Aesthetically it is good example of a low level sewage pumping station designed in the Federation Queen Anne style. In its surviving fabric, SP0003 reflects the importance of Federation Period public utilities which is evident in the overall design and technical excellence of the traditional construction techniques and craftsmanship such as the stone dressings and tuckpointed brickwork. The pumping station is technically significant for continually fulfilling its role nearly a century after its introduction as a low level sewage pumping station as originally designed and constructed, apart from minor mechanical and electrical modifications. It has educational and interpretation potential to reveal information about the development of sewage pumping engineering, and in architectural taste in a period when utilitarian buildings were given as much careful attention as public buildings. The significance of the place is enhanced by the intactness of external elements, including the original lifting crane and timber gates.

Sewage Pumping Station 3 was listed on the New South Wales State Heritage Register on 18 November 1999 having satisfied the following criteria.

The place is important in demonstrating the course, or pattern, of cultural or natural history in New South Wales.

SP0003, Annandale was built in 1902 and was among the original network of 20 low level sewage pumping stations constructed to serve Sydney. The pumping stations along with the construction of the Bondi and Southern Outfall Sewers, formed a part of the major advance in the protection of the public health of Sydney by ending the discharge of sewage into the harbour. The construction of SP0003 evidences the growth of Sydney and expansion of municipal services during the early part of the 20th century.

The place is important in demonstrating aesthetic characteristics and/or a high degree of creative or technical achievement in New South Wales.

SP0003 is a fine example of a robust and well proportioned small scale industrial Federation Queen Anne style building which displays in its fabric a combination of superior utilitarian design, construction and craftsmanship.

The place has a strong or special association with a particular community or cultural group in New South Wales for social, cultural or spiritual reasons.

The excellent design of the superstructure by the Department of Public Works reflects the body of work emanating from the then Government Architect, Walter Liberty Vernon. With community awareness of the cultural significance of these group of SPSs the heritage community at least is likely to hold these stations in high regard.

The place has potential to yield information that will contribute to an understanding of the cultural or natural history of New South Wales.

SP0003 has the potential to reveal information about construction techniques and design of the concrete substructure relevant to its intended use. The pumping station still fulfils its role nearly a century after its introduction as a low level sewage pumping station as originally designed and constructed albeit with some mechanical upgrading.

The place possesses uncommon, rare or endangered aspects of the cultural or natural history of New South Wales.

SP0003 is unique as part of the network of first generation low level sewage pumping stations. It served the historically significant Southern Outfall Sewer (later Southern and Western Suburbs Ocean Outfall Sewer)

The place is important in demonstrating the principal characteristics of a class of cultural or natural places/environments in New South Wales.

The superstructure is a representative example of a small scale Federation Queen Anne style industrial building. SP0003 is a representative example of a low level sewage pumping station on the Southern and Western Suburbs Outfall Sewer.

== See also ==
- Media related to Sewage Pumping Station 3 at Wikimedia Commons
