= Hunter Baillie Memorial Presbyterian Church =

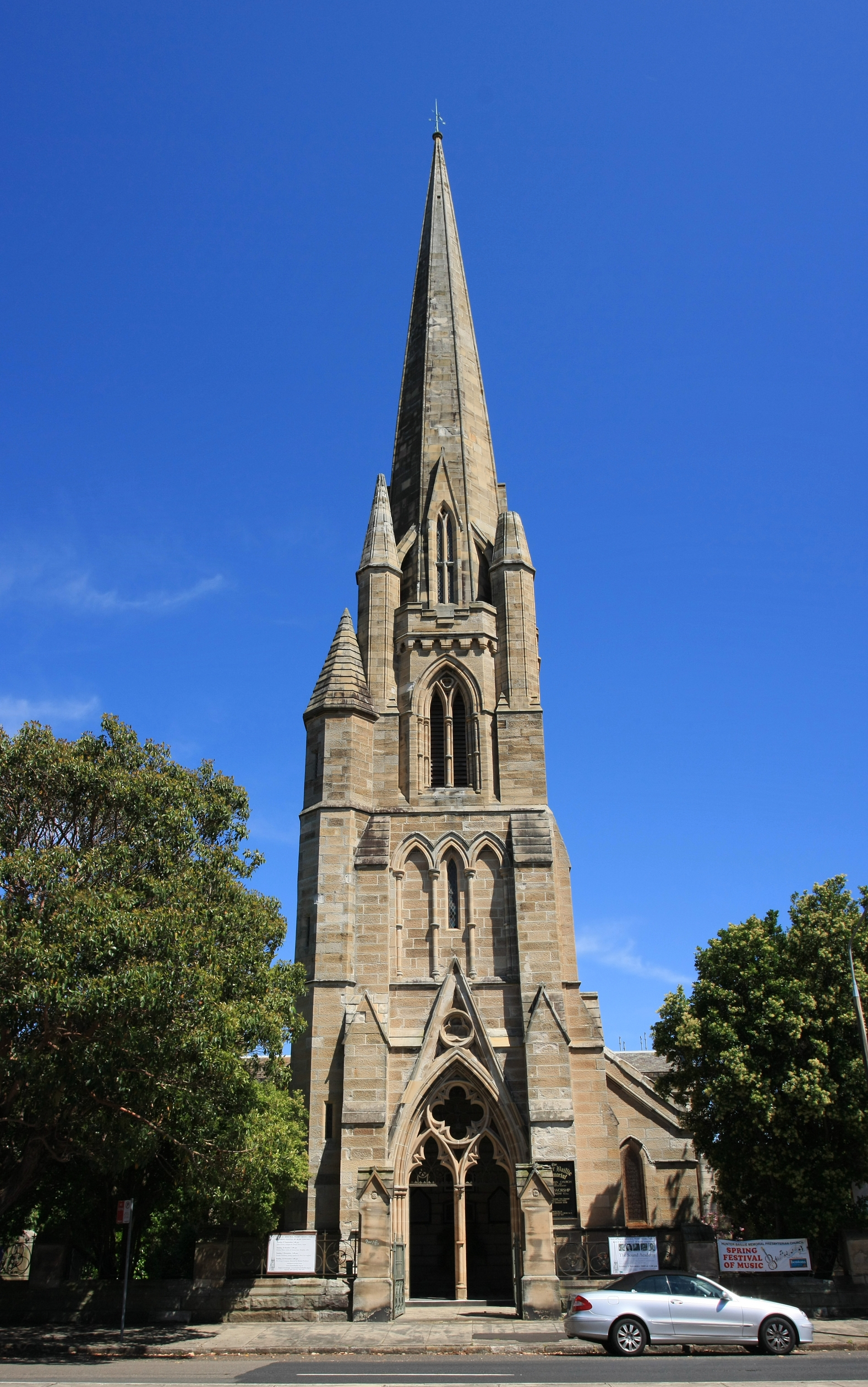
- Front of church and spire
- Hunter Baillie Memorial Presbyterian Church
- 33°53′00″S 151°10′10″E
- Location: Johnston Street, Annandale, Sydney, New South Wales
- Country: Australia
- Denomination: Presbyterian
- Website: hunterbaillie.com

History
- Status: Church
- Founder: Rev. Peter Falconer Mackenzie
- Dedication: John Hunter Baillie

Architecture
- Functional status: Active
- Architect(s): Cyril and Arthur Blacket
- Architectural type: Victorian Gothic Revival
- Years built: 1886–1889

Specifications
- Materials: White Pyrmont sandstone; Slate roof; Aberdeen granite; Melbourne bluestone

Administration
- Division: New South Wales
- Parish: Annandale

New South Wales Heritage Register
- Official name: Hunter Baillie Memorial Presbyterian Church
- Type: Built
- Criteria: a., b., c., f.
- Designated: 2 April 1999
- Reference no.: 00011

The Hunter Baillie Memorial Presbyterian Church is a heritage–listed Presbyterian church, located in the inner western Sydney suburb of Annandale, New South Wales, Australia.

The church is an example of Gothic Revival architecture. It was designed by Cyril and Arthur Blacket and built from 1886 to 1889. It was listed on the (now defunct) Register of the National Estate and was listed on the New South Wales State Heritage Register on 2 April 1999.

== History ==
The church was erected between 1886 and 1889 by Helen Hay Mackie Baillie, the sister-in-law of John Dunmore Lang, as a memorial to her late husband, John Hunter Baillie (1818–1854). Its sandstone spire reaches a height of 56 metres (184 ft) and is the tallest church spire in New South Wales. Only the twin 70-metre (230 ft) spires of Sydney's St Mary's Cathedral completed in 2000 are taller, but are steel cored.

The church was designed in the Victorian Gothic Revival style by Cyril and Arthur Blacket, sons of the noted Colonial architect, Edmund Blacket. Its interior features massive pillars of Aberdeen granite with Melbourne bluestone bases and capitals. The baptismal font and pulpit are carved from New Zealand Oamaru stone and green marble.

The church houses a large 19th Century organ by William Hill & Son of London.

== Description ==
The Hunter Baillie Memorial Presbyterian Church is a Victorian Gothic Revival style church constructed of white Pyrmont sandstone, the base in rusticated but remaining masonry is dressed.

The church consists of a nave of six bays with two transepts. In place of a chancel is a separate vestry. At the eastern end of the nave (i.e. ecclesiastical west), there is a square tower with a newell stairway and spire the apex of which rises 55 metres from the ground. There is a parapet walkway at the base of the spire. At each corner of the tower there is a finial connected with the spire by two flying buttresses.

The church has an open king post roof, possibly of cedar, which spans the nave. Pillars which support the nave have columns of Aberdeen granite with capitals and feet of Victorian bluestone. The roofs of the South transept and the nave are covered in Westmorland slate. The roof of the north transept is covered in a European green and Bangor slate. Vestry and porch roofs are covered in Westmorland slate.

Except for the tower porch, the floor is of wood. The area unoccupied by communion and pew platforms is paved in encaustic tile of geometric design.

The threshold of the gates to the tower porch is of Victorian bluestone. The rest of the tower porch floor is paved in black and white diagonal marble bordered in red encaustic tile. The ceiling of the tower porch is vaulted in stone. The principal doorway to the porch is embellished at the arch with tracery in stone and with ornamental wrought iron. There are two ornamental wrought iron grill gates within the principal doorway.

Doors throughout the church are of cedar. Lancet windows of the tower's newell stairway and upper storeys together with the spire's dormer windows are of leaded tinted glass. The windows of the bell chamber are fitted with wooden louvres. Aisle, clerestorey, transept, vestry and western porch windows are of leaded geometric coloured glass.

The designs of the pointed arches of the nave and apsidal arches of the transepts are possibly contrived freehand rather than by geometry.

Gas brackets in brass encircle the capitals of columns in the nave and have bands decorated with Scotch thistles and Greek crosses.

The Collins and Johnston Street perimeters are fenced in Pyrmont sandstone with a rusticated base and dressed piers with gabled caps, the piers being connected by wrought-iron balastrades.

The main porch contains the following tablets:

- West wall - top 'This tablet was erected by the congregation in loving remembrance of Isabella Dunmore Lang and Widow of the founder of the Church, born at Sydney, 8 November 1843, Died at Casula NSW 24 January 1925, the expression of her love for Christ was in loving service to others. "His servants shall serve and they shall see His Face". Revelations XXII, 3–4
- West wall - below "This Church was erected by his widow to the memory of John Hunter Baillie, generous friend of the Presbyterian Church in this colony and a liberal contributor to many benevolent and charitable institutions - born at Hamilton, Scotland, on 29th July, 1818, died at Sydney, 25th March, 1854. The memory of the just is blessed". Proverbs X, 7.
- West wall - left "To the memory of Helen Hay, widow of John Hunter Baillie, daughter of the late William Mackie of Greenock, Scotland, 9th October 1815. Died at Sydney, 18th May, 1897, in the 83rd year of her age. Blessed are the dead who die in the Lord. They rest from their labours and their works do follow them" Revelations IV, 13"
- West wall - right "This tablet was erected by the Congregation in affectionate remembrance of the Rev. Peter Falconer Mackenzie, founder of this Church, who entered upon rest on the 26th October, 1904, in 73rd year of his age, the 47th year of his Ministry, and the 19th year of his pastorate of this congregation. He feared God and knew no other fear"

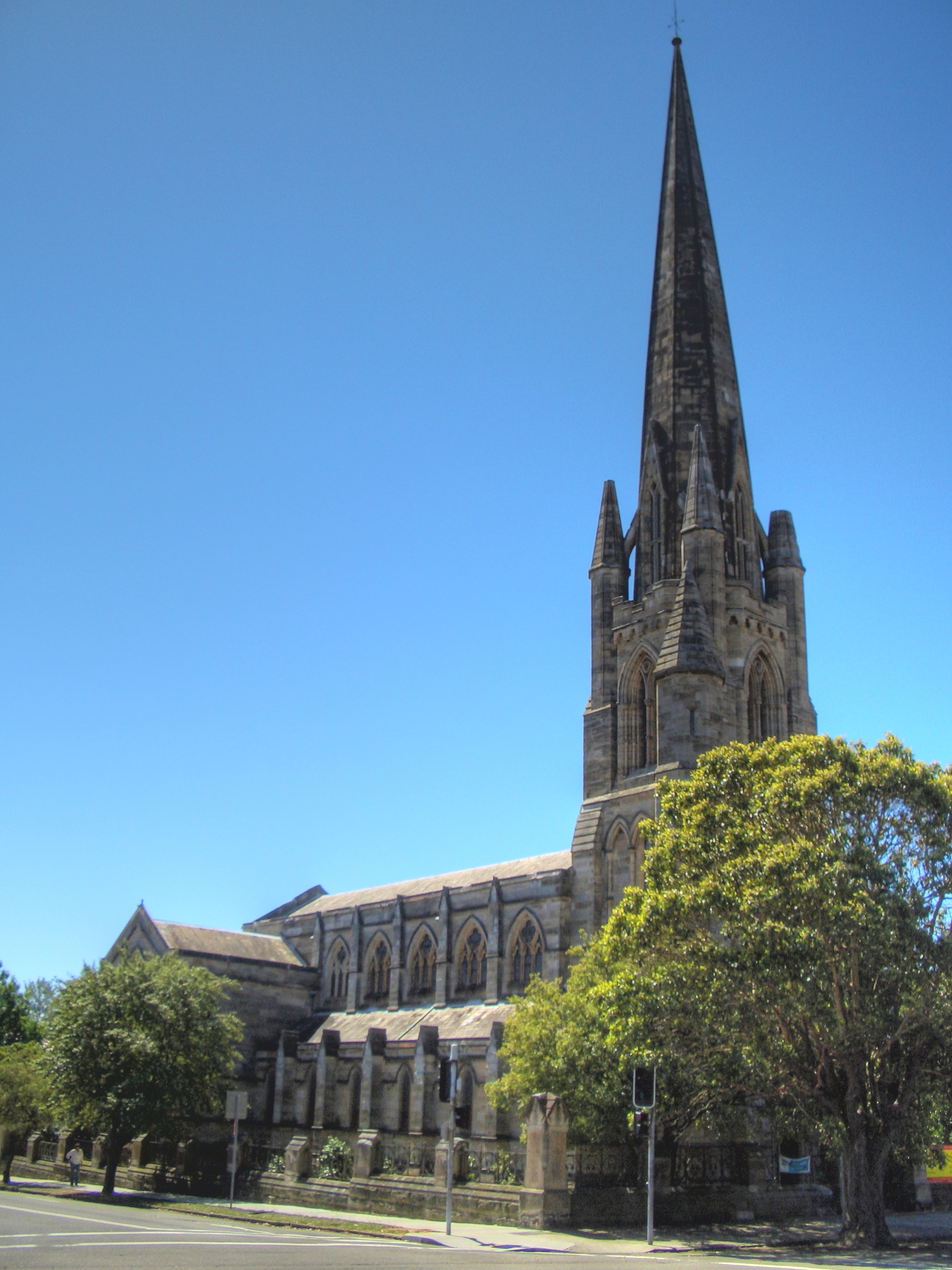
Hunter Baillie Memorial Presbyterian Church, in 2006.

The Memorials to the First World War, 1914–18, are on either side of the main porch and they were both unveiled by his Excellency, Lord Forster, P.C, Governor-General, 19 December 1920.

The 1890 William Hill & Sons Organ is one of only six Hill & Son organs in NSW to have survived in original condition and is particularly distinguished because of its unique case.

== Services and activities ==
Over the years significant anniversaries have been celebrated including the church's centenary in 1989 and, on 1 March 2009, the church's 120th anniversary was celebrated. There is a current National Trust sponsored Appeal, which seeks to raise the estimated $4.5 million required for restoration of the building and organ.

Sunday Service and Sunday School continue to be held each Sunday at 10am with special services at Christmas and Easter and for such events as the annual Kirking of the Tartan in June.

== Heritage listing ==
Hunter Baillie Memorial Church is one of the last and certainly one of the finest examples of "archaeological" Gothic in New South Wales. It shows none of the influence of later Victorian modifications of Gothic evident in the Church Hall (1886). The interior is unremarkable and the variety in the styles of the arches is confusing. The tower and spire are probably the best in Sydney and have dominated the "planned" suburb of Annandale for many years. It is associated with the architects Cyril and Arthur Blacket and is one of the last major churches in the State built entirely by private philanthropy.

Hunter Baillie Memorial Presbyterian Church was listed on the New South Wales State Heritage Register on 2 April 1999 having satisfied the following criteria.

The place is important in demonstrating the course, or pattern, of cultural or natural history in New South Wales.

Hunter Baillie Memorial Presbyterian Church is one of the last major churches in the State built entirely by private philanthropy.

The place has a strong or special association with a person, or group of persons, of importance of cultural or natural history of New South Wales's history.

It is associated with Cyril and Arthur Blacket.

The place is important in demonstrating aesthetic characteristics and/or a high degree of creative or technical achievement in New South Wales.

The Church features a tall spire prominent on the Annandale and Sydney skyline. The organ constructed by Hill and Son of London is significant as one of the few remaining late 19th century organs of English manufacture in Australia which has survived in largely original condition.

The place possesses uncommon, rare or endangered aspects of the cultural or natural history of New South Wales.

Possibly one of the last completed examples of archaeological Gothic Revival Churches in New South Wales.

== See also ==
- Presbyterian Church of Australia
