= Barbara Ramsden =

Australian editor

Barbara Ramsden MBE
- Born: 27 December 1903; Annandale, New South Wales, Australia
- Died: 1 January 1971 (aged 67); Melbourne, Victoria, Australia
- Education: Ascham School
- Alma mater: University of Melbourne
- Occupation: Book editor

Barbara Mary Ramsden MBE (27 December 1903 – 1 January 1971) was an Australian book editor who worked for Melbourne University Press from 1941 to 1967.

Ramsden was born in the Sydney suburb of Annandale to English migrants Edward and Edith Ramsden. She boarded at Ascham School, and intended to study medicine but instead enrolled in arts at the University of Sydney in 1924. The next year, she moved with her mother and brother to Melbourne, where she enrolled in the University of Melbourne and completed her Bachelor of Arts degree.

She then worked for the university at the engineering and central libraries, and also worked part-time as an assistant reader at Melbourne University Press (MUP). In 1941, MUP appointed her formally in the role, working for manager Frank Wilmot. When Wilmot died in 1942, Ramsden essentially assumed his role managing the publisher but was never promoted, and was not selected for the role when she applied for it in April 1942.

Following Ramsden's death from cancer in 1971, the Fellowship of Australian Writers established the FAW Barbara Ramsden Award for excellence in writing and editing an Australian book.
