= Gossip from the Forest =

Novel by Thomas Keneally

- First edition
- Author: Thomas Keneally
- Language: English
- Publisher: Collins, England and Australia
- Publication date: 1975
- Publication place: Australia
- Media type: Print (Hardback & Paperback)
- Pages: 222 pp
- ISBN: 0151367051
- OCLC: 1863442
- Dewey Decimal: 823
- LC Class: PZ4.K336 Go 1976 PR9619.3.K46

Gossip from the Forest is a 1975 novel by the Australian author Thomas Keneally which deals with the negotiations surrounding the ending of World War I. The book was shortlisted for the 1975 Booker Prize.

== Subject matter ==
"In Gossip from the Forest, Keneally offered a concentrated fictional presentation of the peace talks that took place in the Forest of Compiègne in November 1918, focusing on the highest-ranking German negotiator, Matthias Erzberger, a liberal pacifist.

== Critical reception ==
According to The New York Times Book Review's Paul Fussell, Gossip from the Forest 'is a study of the profoundly civilian and pacific sensibility beleaguered by crude power.... it is absorbing, and as history it achieves the kind of significance earned only by sympathy acting on deep knowledge.'

Robert E. McDowell in "World Literature Today" concluded that 'with Gossip from the Forest Keneally has succeeded better than in any of his previous books in lighting the lives of historical figures and in convincing us that people are really the events of history.'"

== Notes ==
- "Dedication: To My Father."
- "Author's note: In the season in which this book was written, the French government persisted in exploding nuclear devices above the ocean where my children swim."

== Awards and nominations ==
- Man Booker Prize: shortlisted 1975
- FAW Barbara Ramsden Award for the Book of the Year, 1975: joint winner

== Adaptations ==
- "Screenplay", Season 1, Episode 1, UK television adaptation. This first screened on 19 July 1979. The teleplay was written and directed by Brian Gibson, and featured Ray Armstrong, Hugh Burden, David Calder and Paul Clayton.
- Theatre Adaptation by Sydney Theatre Company. The play premiered on 5 May 1983.
