= Just Relations =

1982 novel by Australian author Rodney Hall

- First edition
- Author: Rodney Hall
- Language: English
- Genre: Novel
- Publisher: Penguin, Australia
- Publication date: 1982
- Publication place: Australia
- Media type: Paperback
- Pages: 502
- ISBN: 0-14-006097-9
- OCLC: 9282964
- Dewey Decimal: 823 19
- LC Class: PR9619.3.H285 J87 1982
- Preceded by: A Place Among People
- Followed by: Kisses of the Enemy

Just Relations is a 1982 novel by Australian author Rodney Hall. Set in the fictional declining gold-mining village of Whitey's Fall in New South Wales, the novel chronicles the lives of the town's ageing and eccentric inhabitants as they resist government plans for restoration and tourist development. The novel won the Miles Franklin Award, the FAW ANA Literature Award, and the FAW Barbara Ramsden Award for the Book of the Year in 1982.

== Plot ==
Whitey's Fall is a remote former gold-mining settlement in New South Wales with a population of 49, most of them founding elders aged between 80 and 114. The townsfolk have no wish to be restored, preserved, or improved, and their chief communal activity is "Remembering". The village harbours a long-defunct gold mine surrounded by mythology about a mountain of gold.

The eccentric inhabitants include Miss Felicia Brinsmead, a 73-year-old spinster whose uncut hair hangs over her like a huge web, and who believes she is the mother of a twelve-year-old boy called Fido. Her brother Sebastian Brinsmead, a shopkeeper, composes formal letters rejecting outside interference. Other residents include the narcissistic Mr Ping, a Chinese welder distraught over the loss of his physical beauty who is driven to self-scarring, and an old woman who has knitted the entire interior of her house, window views included.

Into this community arrives Vivien Lang, a 34-year-old woman whose aunt in England, one of the village's original inhabitants, has bequeathed her a house. Vivien is seduced by the charms of Whitey's Fall and falls in love with Billy Swan, one of the few young people in town, to the scandal of some residents. Also arriving is Senator Frank Halloran, a government man who informs the community that a highway is being built through the town. Billy, sensing that the town faces something worse than rehabilitation once the new road arrives, spends much of the novel planning an explosion that will close down the gold mine forever.

== Structure ==
The novel is divided into six books: "The Mountain Road", "The Golden Fleece", "Seven Figures Without Landscape" (comprising seven character portraits: "The Maker of Circles", "The Violinist", "The Narcissist", "The Doubter", "The Victim of Ambition", "The Shape-Thinker", and "The Webster"), "Tree-felling", "The Watch that Ends the Night", and "Exodus".

== Critical reception ==
The novel received widespread critical acclaim. Marion Halligan, writing in The Canberra Times, called it "the most exciting new book I have read in a long time", adding: "It is impossible to categorise such a book. It's farce, it's comedy, it's tragedy; it's grotesque and tender and dreadful. And full of wisdom; little essential drops of it well out of the narrative from time to time."

Kirkus Reviews praised Hall's "accomplished poetic prose-styles", calling the novel "a tour-de-force of narrative orchestration" with "utopian/surreal/pastoral touches", though noting that the plot was "essentially skimpy and predictable". The review concluded that "readers who delight in stylistic fun will find Hall's fiction debut a must: a nickelodeon concert of lavish proportions—a bit rinky-tinky perhaps, but impressive and delicious all the same."

The Los Angeles Times wrote that "when a work of art appears in a form of a book so astonishingly well written, it bids to take one's breath away", while The New Yorker described the novel as "quite wonderful".

== Publishing history ==
Just Relations was first published by Penguin in Australia in 1982. The American edition, published by Viking Press in 1983, was Hall's first book to be published in the United States. The novel was subsequently published as follows:

- Allen Lane 1983, UK
- Simon & Schuster 1989, USA
- Faber & Faber 1990, UK
- Picador 2000, Australia
- House of Books 2012, Australia

== Awards ==
- 1982 Miles Franklin Award
- 1982 FAW ANA Literature Award
- 1982 The Age Book of the Year Awards – Fiction (or Imaginative Writing) Award, shortlisted
- 1983 FAW Barbara Ramsden Award for the Book of the Year, winner

== See also ==
- 1982 in Australian literature
