= The Day We Had Hitler Home =

2000 novel by Rodney Hall

- First edition
- Author: Rodney Hall
- Language: English
- Genre: Novel
- Publisher: Picador, Australia
- Publication date: 2000
- Publication place: Australia
- Media type: Print (Paperback)
- Pages: 351 pp
- ISBN: 0-330-36198-8
- OCLC: 45585099
- Dewey Decimal: 823/.914 21
- LC Class: PR9619.3.H285 D39 2000
- Preceded by: The Island in the Mind
- Followed by: The Last Love Story

The Day We Had Hitler Home is a 2000 novel by the Australian author Rodney Hall.

== Synopsis ==
In 1919 a young German soldier, blinded by gas, joins the wrong queue of evacutees. He is also unable to speak and so cannot tell anyone his name, private first-class Adolf Hitler. As a result, he mistakenly boards a steamer headed for Australia.

== Awards and nominations ==
- Miles Franklin Literary Award, 2001: shortlisted
- ALS Gold Medal, 2001: winner

== Critical reception ==
Joanna Giffiths in The Observer noted that the book "jerks the reader to attention by depositing Hitler into the plot, only to recede into opaque twists and obscuring quirkiness."

== Publication history ==
After the novel's initial publication by Picador in Australia in 2000 it was then published as follows:

- Granta, UK, 2001

It was also translated into Portuguese (2001) and Spanish (2002).

== See also ==
- 2000 in Australian literature
