= The Grisly Wife =

1993 novel by Rodney Hall

- First edition
- Author: Rodney Hall
- Language: English
- Genre: Novel
- Publisher: Macmillan, Australia
- Publication date: 1993
- Publication place: Australia
- Media type: Paperback
- Pages: 261
- ISBN: 0-7329-0776-4
- OCLC: 29841439
- Preceded by: The Second Bridegroom
- Followed by: The Island in the Mind

The Grisly Wife is a 1993 Miles Franklin literary award-winning novel by the Australian author Rodney Hall.

The Miles Franklin Award Judges' Report called it "a novel with a rather surprising vision."

This novel is the second book in The Yandilli Trilogy (also referred to as A Dream More Luminous Than Love), though the third to be published, following the novels Captivity Captive in 1988, and The Second Bridegroom in 1991.

== Synopsis ==
Catherine Byrne marries self-proclaimed prophet Muley Moloch and leaves 19th-century England with him and his eight female disciples to search for paradise on earth in the wilds of Australia. But things do not work out as planned, as a shipwreck, illness and death cause the small group to fracture.

== Critical reception ==
Jeff Doyle in The Canberra Times noted: "Hall is not so basic nor simplistic to provide a kind of allegorical reading of these issues under his stories. No, such a naive, perhaps crassly simple, view is the job of a reviewer bent on hinting at the multiple ideas running through the book."

== Awards ==
- Miles Franklin Literary Award, 1994: winner
- NBC Banjo Awards, NBC Banjo Award for Fiction, 1994: shortlisted

== See also ==
- 1993 in Australian literature
