= Jenny Hocking =

Australian political science writer and researcher

Jenny Hocking AM FASSA
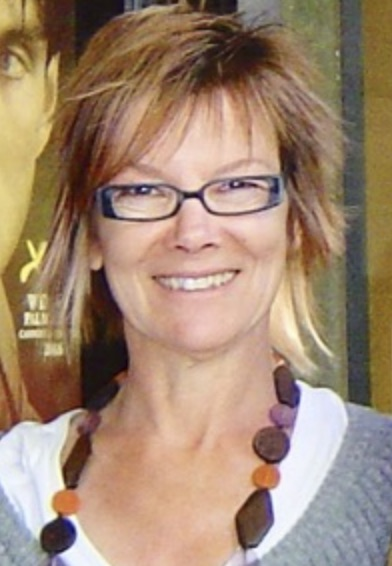
- Hocking in 2006
- Born: Melbourne, Victoria, Australia
- Education: Lauriston Girls' School
- Alma mater: Monash University, University of Sydney
- Occupations: Writer, researcher, academic based at Monash University
- Partner: Daryl Dellora
- Writing career
- Language: English
- Notable works: Lionel Murphy: A Political Biography; Frank Hardy: Politics, Literature, Life; Gough Whitlam: A Moment in History; Gough Whitlam: His Time; The Dismissal Dossier; The Palace Letters: The Queen, the Governor-General, and the Plot to dismiss Gough Whitlam

Jennifer Jane Hocking is an Australian historian, political scientist and biographer. She is the inaugural Distinguished Whitlam Fellow with the Whitlam Institute at Western Sydney University, Emeritus Professor at Monash University, and former Director of the National Centre for Australian Studies at Monash University. Her work is in two key areas, counter-terrorism and Australian political biography. In both areas she explores Australian democratic practice, the relationship between the arms of government, and aspects of Australian political history. Her research into the life of former Australian prime minister Gough Whitlam uncovered significant new material on the role of High Court justice Sir Anthony Mason in the dismissal of the Whitlam government. This has been described as "a discovery of historical importance". Since 2001 Hocking has been a member of the Board of Trustees of the Lionel Murphy Foundation.

== Early life and education ==
Hocking is the daughter of Frederick Hocking, a psychiatrist with a significant practice treating survivors of long-term trauma, many of whom were Holocaust survivors, and Barbara Hocking, the first barrister briefed in the Mabo case. She was born in Melbourne, Victoria, in 1954 and attended Lauriston Girls' School and then Monash University, where she graduated with both a Bachelor of Science and subsequently a Bachelor of Economics.

Hocking was particularly influenced at Monash University by Professor Ian Ward, a noted economic historian. After graduating from Monash University in the late 1970s she worked as a printer for the underground Walker Press in Collingwood printing large format colour posters, political pamphlets, newsletters and booklets.

In 1977 Hocking met her partner, Daryl Dellora, a documentary filmmaker. Together they formed the film production company Film Art Doco, and have co-scripted several award-winning documentaries including Against the Innocent (1988) and Mr Neal is Entitled to be an Agitator (1991). The latter, dealing with the former High Court justice and Attorney-General Lionel Murphy, has been screened on ABC television.

Hocking holds a Doctor of Philosophy degree from the University of Sydney. Her thesis examined the establishment of Australia's counter-terrorism framework and was published as Beyond Terrorism: The Development of the Australian Security State in 1993.

In the early 1980s while still a graduate student, Hocking began what is now an extensive publications record. Her work appeared in a range of outlets including the Friends of the Earth magazine Chain Reaction, Australian Society, Media Information Australia, and the leading Australian political science journal, Politics. Her work also appeared at this time in the Communist Party's weekly newspaper Tribune and monthly journal Australian Left Review. Her early work focused on the Australian security apparatus. She has argued that the allegations of espionage against David Combe in the Combe–Ivanov affair of 1983 were fabricated by ASIO in response to Combe's attempts to reveal CIA involvement in the Whitlam dismissal in 1975. Hocking has also argued that the Sydney Hilton Hotel bombing of 1978 was a false flag operation by ASIO, which sought to justify its existence in the face of possible budget cuts. She was interviewed for Dellora's 1994 documentary Conspiracy, which screened on ABC TV.

== Academic career ==
=== Palace letters campaign ===
In 2016 Hocking commenced proceedings in the Federal Court of Australia against the National Archives of Australia seeking the release of secret correspondence between former governor-general, Sir John Kerr and the Queen regarding the dismissal of the Whitlam government. These 'Palace letters' were held by the Archives and were under the embargo of the Queen, potentially indefinitely. The case was unsuccessful in the Federal Court and in February 2019 an appeal to the Full Court of the Federal Court was rejected by a majority. However, in May 2020 Hocking's appeal to the High Court succeeded: in an emphatic 6:1 decision the High Court found that the Palace letters are "Commonwealth records" (not personal property) and instructed the Director-General of the National Archives to reconsider Hocking's request for access to the letters, as well as to pay all of Hocking's considerable legal costs. The letters were released in full and online on 14 July 2020.

=== Reaction to Hocking's research on Whitlam ===
As a consequence of the importance of Gough Whitlam in Australia's political history, Hocking's books about him, and featuring him, have received considerable attention from public commentators, academics and politicians. Overall, the response has been positive.

According to the judges of the Barbara Ramsden Award, the Whitlam biography was recognised as "an unusually thorough treatment and ... a monumental project ... reminiscent of the glory days of publishing".

Its quality was also highly praised: Frank Bongiorno called it "A fascinating and important account ... and a tour de force as a piece of history ...". Greg Kelton suggested it might be "the best Australian political biography In decades ... ". Neal Blewett stated that "There is no better account of how the triumph of 1972 turned into the catastrophe of 1975." At the launching of the book, former Labor Prime Minister of Australia Kevin Rudd says that "it lets us see who Gough Whitlam the person was before he became Gough Whitlam the politician".

Former premier of Western Australia, Carmen Lawrence, wrote: "It is a testament to Hocking’s research, her eye for the apt example, and her scholarship that she is able to expand our understanding of the man, and the influences that shaped such a significant Australia figure."

=== Public commentary ===
Hocking, a republican and member of the Australian Republic Movement executive, said of Queen Elizabeth II, “The monarchy is a very strange beast in which it’s both a political institution and a family... In fact, you know you might say in some key ways, the protection of the monarchy as an institution is actually damaging to the family as a human element. Certainly the dynamics recently have suggested that that’s the case... she’s been a figure of stability and unity in managing those really difficult human aspects and human elements.” In 2022, Hocking said King Charles III had a "very well-known tendency to engage in the political space that really monarchs and monarchs-to-be should not be engaging in", had caused "a great conservatism in architecture" and engaged in "very party-political intervention" with respect to the black spider memos when he was Prince of Wales.

== Major works ==
- Beyond Terrorism: the Development of the Australian Security State, Sydney: Allen & Unwin, 1993, ISBN 1863733604 (paperback)
  The author chronicles and discusses the development of Australia’s security organisations. She highlights the importance of the buzzwords” “terrorism”, “counter-terrorism” and “subversion”. Hocking voices concern at the way security organisations are tempted to build up their own status and "recognition", so as to gain increased government funding, sometimes by exaggerating dangers, imagined events and actual events e.g the Hilton bombing.
- Lionel Murphy: A Political Biography, Melbourne: Cambridge University Press, 2000 ISBN 0 521 79485 4 (paperback)
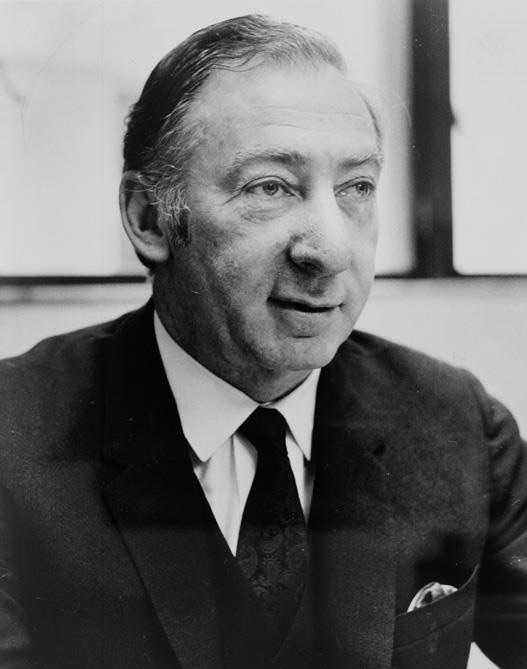
  Lionel Murphy. Senator and reformist Attorney-General in the Whitlam government, Justice of the High Court of Australia. Photo in 1970.

The first edition of this work was published in 1997. This is new edition with a Foreword by Justice Michael Kirby and an Epilogue "Did Lionel Murphy really happen?" by the author, 2000. The book traces Murphy's life from childhood to his role in the Labor split of the 1950s, his pioneering work as a senator and reformist Attorney-General in the Whitlam government, through to his rise to the bench of the High Court, and to his untimely death, amidst controversy, in 1986.

- Terror Laws: ASIO, Counter-terrorism and the Threat to Democracy, Sydney: University of New South Wales Press, 2004. ISBN 086840702X, 9780868407029

The author discusses the issue of balancing the need for national security with individual rights and freedoms. The author argues that, in the light of September 11 and Bali, the security legislation proposed, and in part passed, by the Howard government compromises the separation of powers and individual legal and political rights.

- Frank Hardy: Politics, Literature, Life, Melbourne: Lothian Books, 2005.ISBN 0734408366, ISBN 9780734408365

Christina Hill in the Australian Book Review describes this book as “a non-judgemental and informative life study: Hardy’s tireless political activism on behalf of the left, his work as a public figure and as a writer, his late career as a media personality, his disastrous private life (his drinking, gambling and serial adulteries) all flesh out the man and his world.”

- Gough Whitlam: A Moment in History, Melbourne University Publishing/Miegunyah Press: Melbourne, 2008 ISBN 9780522857054
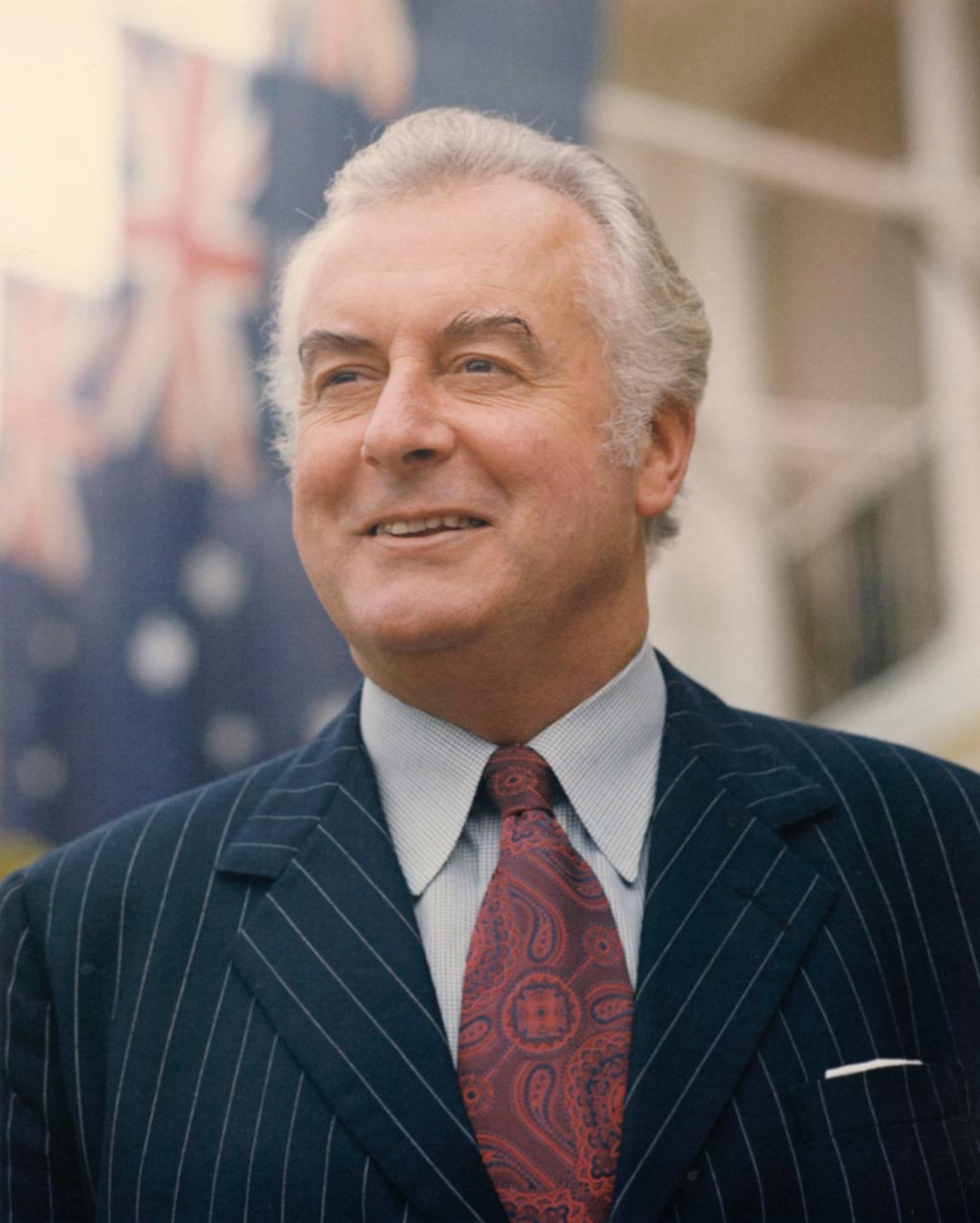
  Gough Whitlam – Prime Minister of Australia

This is Volume I of Gough Whitlam: The Biography. It is a biographical study of the former Labor Prime Minister of Australia. It traces his childhood in the fledgling city of Canberra, his extensive war service in the Pacific and his marriage to Margaret. The biography draws on previously unseen archival material, extensive interviews with family and colleagues, and exclusive interviews with Gough Whitlam himself. The biography describes Whitlam as an extraordinary and complex man whose life was formed by the remarkable events of previous generations of his family. It chronicles his role in changing the Australian political and cultural landscape.

- Gough Whitlam: His Time, Melbourne University Publishing/Miegunyah Press: Melbourne, 2012

This is Volume II of Gough Whitlam: The Biography. It is a new updated edition of this second book, with an additional chapter and Epilogue: “I never said I was immortal, merely eternal”, 2014. This second volume chronicles the period when Gough Whitlam swept to power in the election of December 1972, becoming Australia’s twenty-first prime minister. The author describes the following three years during which Whitlam’s transforming political agenda unfolded. It puts on the record the non-acceptance and resentments of Whitlam’s political enemies. The narrative builds up to the dismissal of the Whitlam government by Governor-General Sir John Kerr covertly supported by Justice Sir Anthony Mason.

- The Dismissal Dossier: Everything you were never meant to know about November 1975, Melbourne: Melbourne University Publishing, 2015.

This is an entirely separate work which has been updated in 2016 and 2017. In the light of newly released documents and hitherto unavailable evidence this work covers the secret story of the planning, the people, and the collusion behind the removal of Gough Whitlam.

- The Palace Letters: The Queen, the Governor-General, and the Plot to dismiss Gough Whitlam, Melbourne: Scribe Publications, 2020 ISBN 9781922310248

== Awards ==
In 2010 Hocking was elected a Fellow of the Academy of the Social Sciences in Australia. In 2013 she was awarded an Australian Research Council Discovery Outstanding Researcher Award (DORA) Fellowship Hocking was a judge of the Walkley Awards for Best Documentary Film (2014) and for the Walkley Awards Best Book (2015). From 2016 to 2021 she was a judge of the Hazel Rowley Literary Fellowship.

Hocking was appointed a Member of the Order of Australia in the 2023 Australian Honours for "significant service to the preservation of Australian political history".

Other awards and honours include:

- Lionel Murphy: A Political Biography was short-listed for the 1998 South Australian Festival Awards for Literature non-fiction award.
- Frank Hardy: Politics, Literature, Life was short-listed for the NSW Premier's History Awards, State Records Prize in 2006;
- Gough Whitlam: A Moment in History was short-listed in 2009 for The Age Book of the Year Award, the Queensland Premier's History Awards and the Prime Minister's Literary Awards, and long-listed in the Walkley Awards.
- In 2012 Gough Whitlam: His Time won the FAW Barbara Ramsden Award in 2014 and was shortlisted in the Prime Minister's Literary Awards (Australian History prize), the Queensland Literary Awards (non-fiction award) and the National Biography Award, and long-listed in The Nib Waverley Library Award for Literature.
- 1999–2005 Professor Hocking was honoured as an Australian Research Council QEII Postdoctoral Fellow.
- In 2002 she was conferred as a Harold White Fellow at the National Library of Australia.

== Bibliography ==
=== Books ===
- Beyond terrorism : the development of the Australian security state. Sydney: Allen & Unwin. 1993.
- Lionel Murphy : a political biography. Melbourne: Cambridge University Press. 1997.
- Lionel Murphy : a political biography (New ed.). Melbourne: Cambridge University Press. 2000.
- Terror laws : ASIO, counter-terrorism and the threat to democracy. Kensington, NSW: University of New South Wales Press. 2004.
- Frank Hardy : politics, literature, life. Melbourne: Lothian Books. 2005.
- Gough Whitlam : a moment in history. Carlton, Vic.: Melbourne University Publishing. 2008.
- Gough Whitlam : his time. Carlton, Vic.: Miegunyah Press. 2012.
- The Dismissal dossier. Carlton, Vic.: Melbourne University Publishing. 2015.
- The Palace Letters : the Queen, the governor-general, and the plot to dismiss Gough Whitlam. Brunswick, Vic.: Scribe. 2020.

=== Essays and reporting ===
- "Subversion and political dissent: where ASIO draws the line". Australian Left Review (89): 38–45. 1984.
- "The election that never was: [Reflection on the 1974 double dissolution.]". Overland (196): 36–40. 2009.
- "The dismissal of the Whitlam Government : from the shadows of history". The National Library of Australia Magazine. 7 (4): 14–17. December 2015.

=== Critical studies and reviews of Hocking's work ===
Gough Whitlam : a moment in history

- Lawrence, Carmen (Autumn 2009). "There's something about Gough (2)". Overland. 194: 82–83.
- MacCallum, Mungo (Autumn 2009). "There's something about Gough (1)". Overland. 194: 80–81.

The Palace Letters

- Piccini, Jon (January–February 2021). "'An endless tussle with the past' : two different readings of the Palace Letters". Australian Book Review. 428: 9–10.
