= Kristel Thornell =

Australian novelist

Kristel Thornell (born 1975) is an Australian novelist. Her first novel, Night Street, co-won The Australian/Vogel Literary Award, and won the Dobbie Literary Award, among other prizes and nominations.

== Writing career ==
Thornell's debut novel, Night Street, a fictionalization of the life of the Australian landscape painter Clarice Beckett, co-won the 2009 Australian/Vogel Literary Award and won the Dobbie Literary Award, the Barbara Ramsden Award, and the University of Rochester's Andrew Eiseman Award. Night Street was proposed for study by the Victorian Curriculum and Assessment Authority (VCAA) from 2014 to 2016. In 2012, Thornell was named one of The Sydney Morning Herald Best Young Australian Novelists. Her second novel, On the Blue Train, published by Allen & Unwin in 2016 and inspired by the "disappearance" of Agatha Christie, was described by Kate Evans of ABC Radio National as "an elegant, literary novel about Teresa Neele, the woman Christie claimed to be when she disappeared, and the imagined people she met in this not-quite-sanctuary". In 2017, Thornell was awarded an Australia Council for the Arts International Residency in Rome. Her third novel, The Sirens Sing, was published by Fourth Estate Australia in 2022.

== Published works ==
- Night Street (2010) ISBN 9780864926722
- On the Blue Train (2016) ISBN 9781525231353
- The Sirens Sing (2022) ISBN 9781460762660

== Awards ==
For Night Street

- 2009 – The Australian/Vogel Literary Award
- 2010 – F.A.W. Barbara Ramsden Award for Book of the Year
- 2011 – Dobbie Literary Award
- 2011 – The Sydney Morning Herald Best Young Australian Novelists Award
- 2011 – Shortlisted for the Christina Stead Prize for Fiction in the New South Wales Premier's Literary Awards
- 2011 – Shortlisted for the Glenda Adams Award for New Writing in the New South Wales Premier's Literary Awards
- 2012 – Andrew Eiseman Writers Award for a book written in Western New York
