= Captivity Captive =

1988 novel by Australian writer Rodney Hall

- Author: Rodney Hall
- Language: English
- Genre: Fiction
- Publisher: Farrar Straus and Giroux
- Publication date: 1988
- Publication place: Australia
- Media type: Print
- Pages: 214 pp.
- ISBN: 0374118892
- Preceded by: Kisses of the Enemy
- Followed by: The Second Bridegroom

Captivity Captive (1988) is a novel by Australian writer Rodney Hall. It was originally published by Farrar Straus and Giroux in US in 1988.

This is Book 3 of The Yandilli Trilogy, but the first to be published. The other books in the trilogy are: The Second Bridegroom (1991) and The Grisly Wife (1993).

== Synopsis ==
In 1898 two sisters and brother are found dead in a paddock, badly beaten and then shot to death. Over 50 years later, with the case still unsolved, Patrick Malone attempts to make sense of the mystery.

== Critical reception ==
Writing in The Canberra Times reviewer Judith Lukin noted: "With this novel Hall proves himself to be an outstanding figure on the Australian literary scene — a writer of quite stunning versatility and truly shocking power...This is a vitally sensual novel, dark and smooth, a terrifying story slashed with loveliness. Hall the poet has found yet another voice as novelist. The book courts the reader with the what-might-have-been and the unimaginable, with a story back-lit as plausible tragedy by the senseless and loveless atrocity of the Great War which was to follow. The family's fate binds love with death and holds not only the murder victims but all the family captives of that violent love in an intertwining that makes the end seem unavoidably natural."

== Publication history ==
After its original publication in 1988 in US by publisher Farrar Straus and Giroux the novel was later reprinted as follows:

- McPhee Gribble, Australia, 1988
- Faber & Faber, UK, 1988
- Collins, Canada, 1988
- Simon & Schuster, USA, 1989

The novel was also translated into French and Danish in 1988, and German in 1990.

== Awards ==
- Miles Franklin Award, 1989, shortlisted
- Victorian Premier's Literary Awards, Vance Palmer Prize for Fiction, 1989, winner

== See also ==
- 1988 in Australian literature
