= Cooks River Sewage Aqueduct =

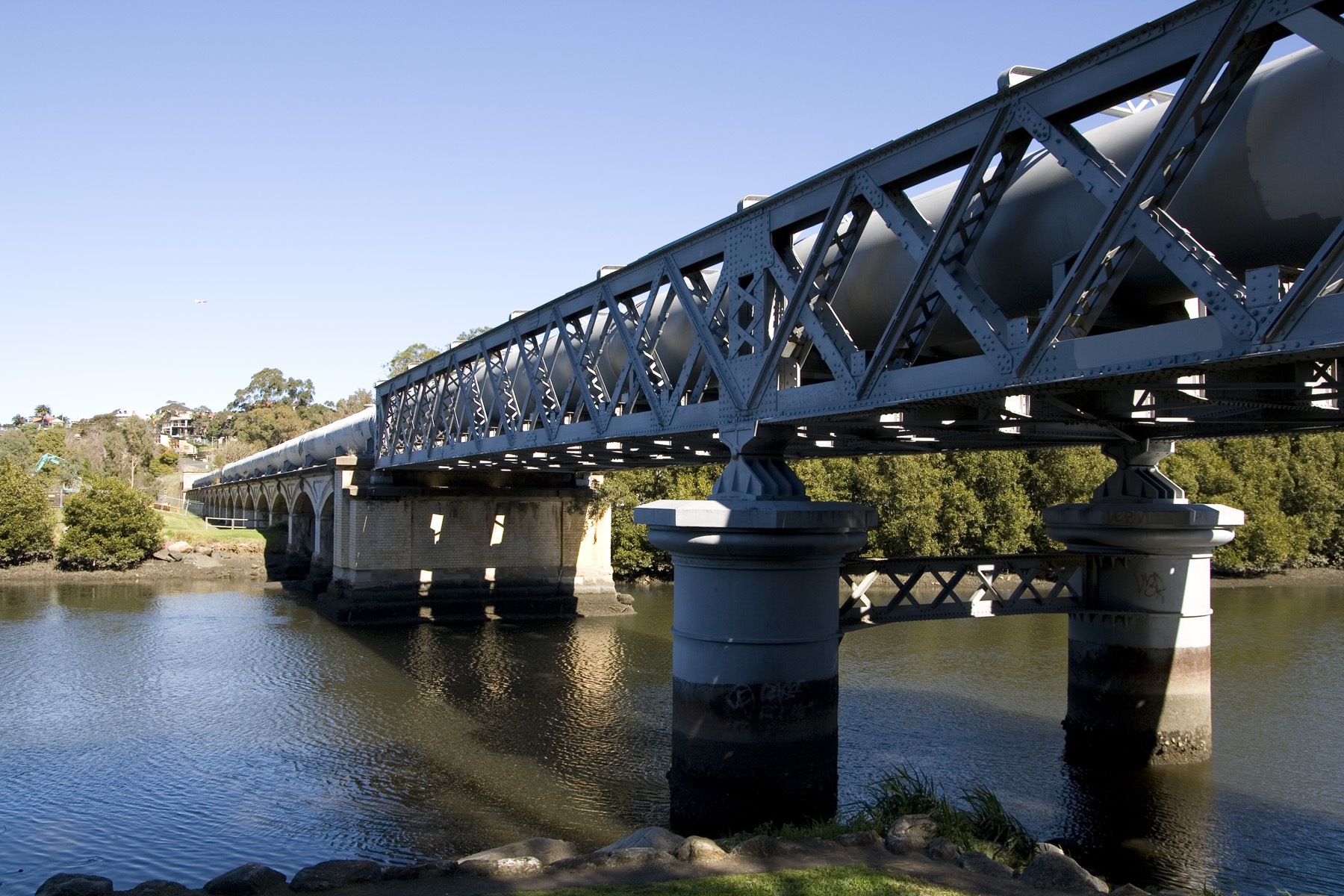
- Cooks River Sewage Aqueduct, looking from Marrickville to Earlwood, 2007

- Location within Sydney Location within Australia
- 33°55′21″S 151°08′52″E
- Location: Pine Street, Undercliffe, City of Canterbury-Bankstown, New South Wales, Australia

History
- Built: 1895

Site notes
- Architects: Sewerage Construction Branch; NSW Department of Public Works
- Owner: Sydney Water

New South Wales Heritage Register
- Official name: Cooks River Sewage Aqueduct
- Type: State heritage (built)
- Designated: 18 November 1999
- Reference no.: 1322
- Type: Sewage Aqueduct
- Category: Utilities – Sewerage
- Builders: J.F. Carson, contractor

The Cooks River Sewage Aqueduct is a heritage-listed sewage aqueduct located at Pine Street, Earlwood, New South Wales, Australia. It crosses the Cooks River to Thornley Street, Marrickville. It was designed by Sewerage Construction Branch and NSW Department of Public Works and built during 1895 by J. F. Carson, contractor. The property is owned by Sydney Water, an agency of the Government of New South Wales. It was added to the New South Wales State Heritage Register on 18 November 1999.

== History ==
The Cooks River sewage aqueduct was completed in 1895. The aqueduct was constructed as the Main Western Carrier, later part of the Southern and Western Suburbs Ocean Outfall Sewer System (SWSOOS). The aqueduct was designed and built by the Sewerage Branch of the NSW Public Works Department, the design work being completed by 1893. The engineer-in-chief of this department at the time was Robert Hickson, who was also a Water Board member. The Main Western Carrier was designed to serve the western suburbs of Sydney. The line extended from the Rockdale end of the Arncliffe sewerage farm (which was enlarged for the scheme) to the sewer penstock at Premier Street, Marrickville. The contract necessitated the construction of aqueducts over the Cooks River, Wolli Creek and at Arncliffe between Rocky Point Road (Princess Highway) and Illawarra Road (Arncliffe Street) and extensive tunnelling. The work was undertaken in two contracts relating to the different construction types.

The contract for the aqueducts was let to J. F. Carson. The original design of the aqueduct provided for a triplicate 1.8-metre (6 ft) diameter wrought iron sewer carrier (although only two pipes were initially laid) supported on 170 metres (560 ft) of segmental 17 brick arches of approximately 9.8-metre (32 ft) span, two 24-metre (80 ft) by 7.6-metre (25 ft) steel lattice girder bridge spans, and 24 metres (80 ft) of a series of mass concrete arches within embankment. The total length of the aqueduct is approximately 220 metres (720 ft).

The bridge spans are of mild steel riveted construction, the sewer carrier pipes being carried on cross beams on two simple lattice girders (on trusses), with a series of small cross lattice girders for wind bracing. The bridge spans are supported on two metal circular piers. The piers of the brick arches are constructed from mass concrete, faced in decorative brick and seated on mass concrete foundations founded on a raft of timber piles. The arches are a combination of brick and sandstone and mass concrete construction. The two original sewer carrier pipes were fabricated from wrought iron and riveted. Expansion joints of 1.8-metre (6 ft) sections were installed at the junction of the brick arches and the steel lattice bridge and above the ninth arch south of the bridge. The third (western) sewer pipe of welded mild steel was laid in 1929. The original pipes have been maintained over the years to the present, with selective replacement of defective sections. The Cooks River is one of six sewage aqueducts in Sydney completed in the period 1895–1901. Others include the reinforced concrete Monier arches at Whites Creek and Johnstons Creek (1897), the mass concrete/brick arches and iron pipe at Wolli Creek (1895), the Mosman Bay steel arch (1901), and the stone/concrete and steel pipe at Lewisham (1900).

== Description ==
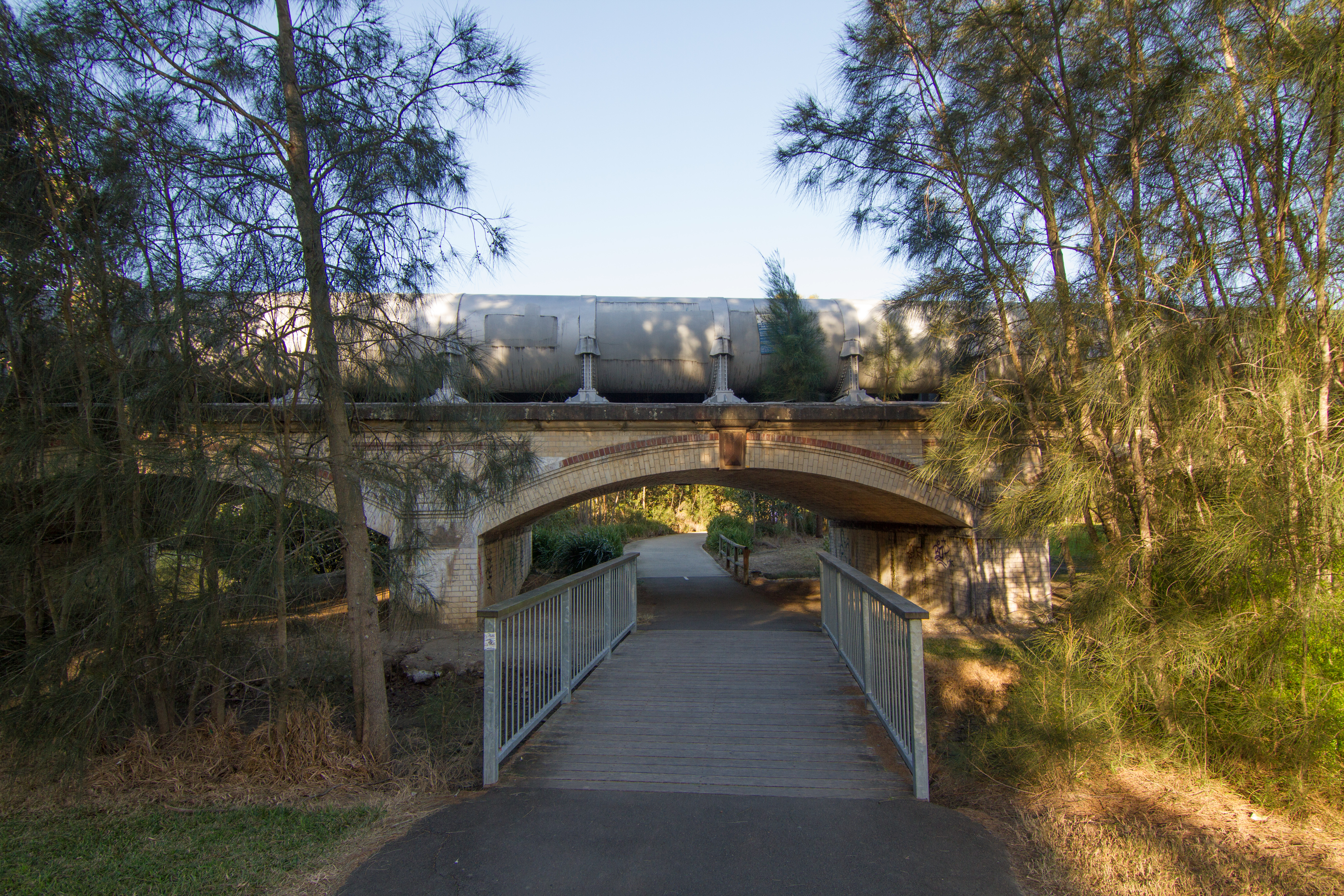
Brick arches over pedestrian path, Earlwood

The aqueduct comprises the sewer carrier of three 1.8-metre (5 ft 11 in) diameter wrought iron and steel pipes supported on a series of brick arches, and steel bridges. The brick arches are particularly decorative, being white glazed face bricks laid in English bond with decorative motifs picked out in red coloured brick. The springing points of the arch and cornice are constructed of dressed sandstone. The sewer carrier emerges from the brick faced northern abutment below Thornley Street, Marrickville crossing the river by the steel trusses and then continuing further across the river and Wanstead Reserve by brick arches to embankment at the end of Wanstead Avenue, Undercliffe. The northernmost terrestrial arch is used as a public path. The original contract drawings indicate that the original river crossing entailed only the two 24-metre (80 ft) steel bridges, today it also requires 2 1/2 spans of the brick arches. The aqueduct is a major built item in the Cooks River valley basin.

=== Modifications and dates ===
The barrels were overhauled between 1981 and 1984, and the surface of the cast iron pipes was coated with a modern fibre-glass lining. The steelwork on the two bridge spans has been replaced where necessary. Fencing at either end of the carrier to prevent trespass.

== Heritage listing ==
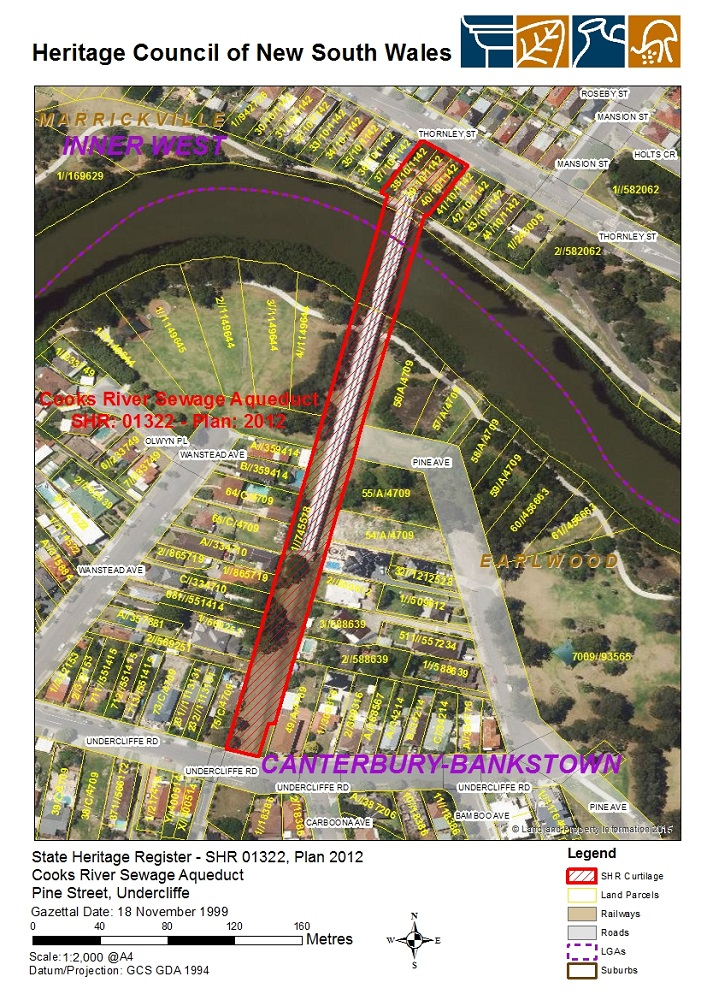
Heritage boundaries

As at 21 April 2005, the Cooks River Valley sewage aqueduct, completed in 1895, was an integral and highly visible component of the original Main Western Carrier (now part of Southern and Western Suburbs Ocean Outfall Sewer System), which was one of the Board's major early sewerage schemes. The aqueduct being a combination of brick arches and steel bridges is an excellent and rare example of a late-nineteenth steel truss bridge (in non railway construction), and decorative face brick work in NSW. The two original sewer carriers are likely to be rare examples of large diameter, long run wrought iron pipes used for such a purpose. Elements of significance are past and ongoing use, construction technologies and setting with the Cooks River valley (inclusive of views).

Cooks River Sewage Aqueduct was listed on the New South Wales State Heritage Register on 18 November 1999 having satisfied the following criteria.

The place is important in demonstrating the course, or pattern, of cultural or natural history in New South Wales.

The Cooks River sewage aqueduct, completed in 1895, is an integral and highly visible component of the Main Western Carrier which subsequently evolved into the Southern and Western Suburbs Ocean Outfall Sewer System. This sewer was one of the Board's earliest major sewer schemes, and was designed under engineer-in-chief Robert Hickson, a foundation board member of Sydney Water .

The place is important in demonstrating aesthetic characteristics and/or a high degree of creative or technical achievement in New South Wales.

The arches of the aqueduct are excellent examples of decorative face brick (in a basically utilitarian structure), which are unlikely to be built again . The aqueduct is now attractively sited within a public reserve adjacent the Cooks River.

The place has a strong or special association with a particular community or cultural group in New South Wales for social, cultural or spiritual reasons.

The aqueduct is a major element of the historic built environment of the local government areas of City of Canterbury-Bankstown and Marrickville and provides a focus for an understanding to the contemporary community of the historical development of the local area. It is listed by groups such as the National Truct of Australia (NSW).

The place has potential to yield information that will contribute to an understanding of the cultural or natural history of New South Wales.

The aqueduct is an excellent example of a late-nineteenth steel truss bridge (in non-railway construction). The wrought pipes are likely to be a rare examples of a large diameter, long run of wrought iron pipe fabricated in 1895. The welded steel pipe of 1929 may also be of significance in consideration of the application of this technology at this early date on a pipe of this length. The face brickwork is a textbook example of the trade in a basically utilitarian structure.

The place possesses uncommon, rare or endangered aspects of the cultural or natural history of New South Wales.

Rare in consideration of its scale, siting and mixed use of materials and construction techniques.

The place is important in demonstrating the principal characteristics of a class of cultural or natural places/environments in New South Wales.

Representative in its function which is widespread across Sydney.

== See also ==
- Cooks River cycleway
- Wolli Creek Aqueduct
