= Wolli Creek Aqueduct =

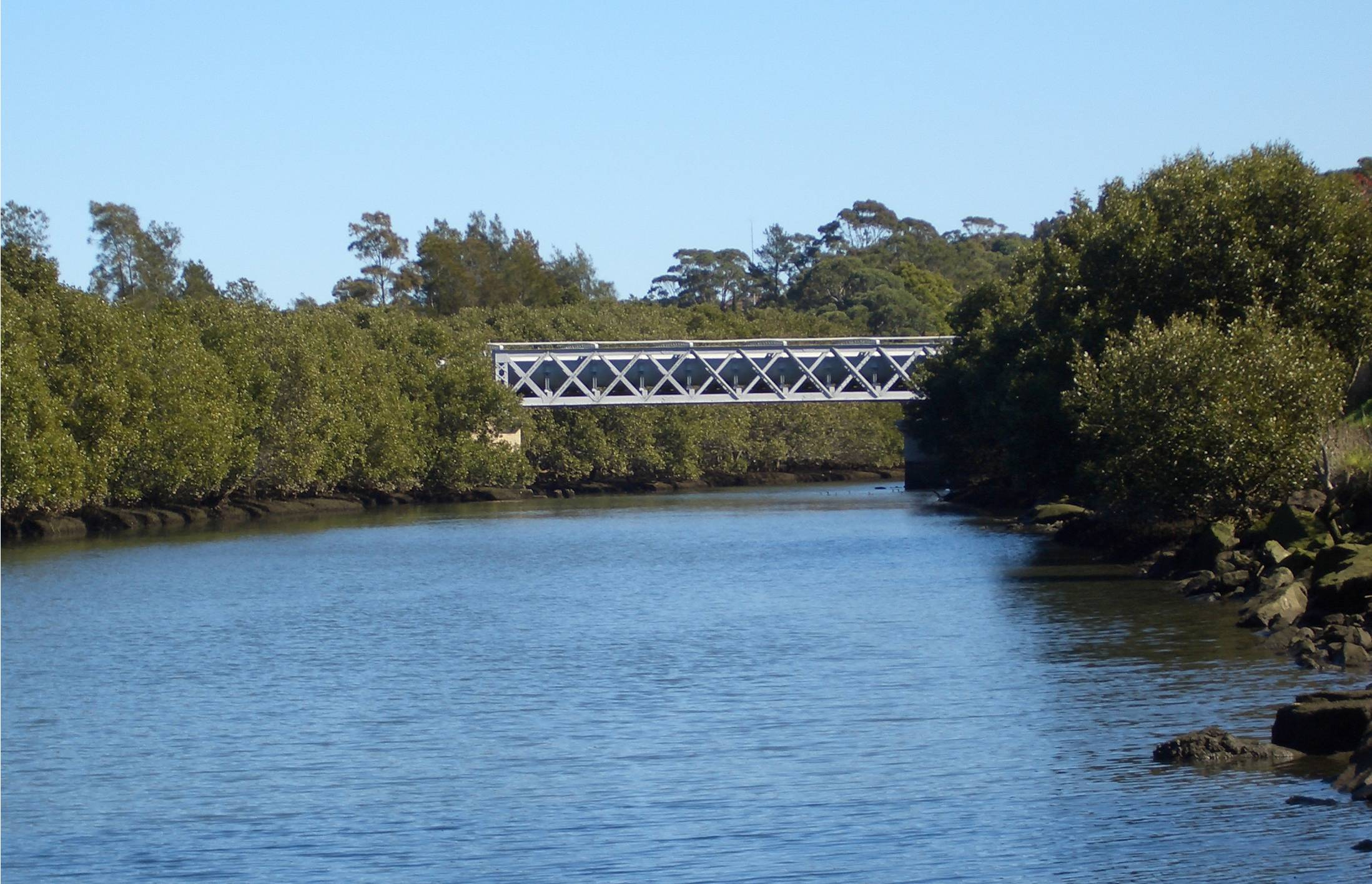
- Wolli Creek Aqueduct, 2006

- Location within Sydney Location within Australia
- 33°55′38″S 151°08′52″E
- Location: Unwin Street, Earlwood, City of Canterbury-Bankstown, New South Wales, Australia

History
- Built: 1895

Site notes
- Architect: NSW Public Works Department
- Owner: Sydney Water

New South Wales Heritage Register
- Official name: Wolli Creek Aqueduct
- Type: State heritage (built)
- Designated: 18 November 1999
- Reference no.: 1355
- Type: Sewage Aqueduct
- Category: Utilities – Sewerage
- Builders: Public Works Department

The Wolli Creek Aqueduct is a heritage-listed sewage aqueduct located at Unwin Street, Earlwood, City of Canterbury-Bankstown, New South Wales, Australia.

The Wolli Creek Aqueduct crosses Wolli Creek to Thompson Street, Turella. It was designed by Public Works Department and built in 1895 by the NSW Public Works Department. The property is owned by Sydney Water, an agency of the Government of New South Wales. It was added to the New South Wales State Heritage Register on 18 November 1999.

== History ==
The Wolli Creek sewage aqueduct was completed in 1895. The aqueduct was constructed for the Western Main Sewer, later known as the Western Suburbs Ocean Outfall Sewer and Southern and Western Suburbs Ocean Outfall Sewer No. 1 (SWSOOS). The aqueduct was designed and built by the Sewerage Branch of the Public Works Department (Contract No. 64). The design work was completed by late 1890. The engineer-in-chief of this department at the time was Robert Hickson. The Western Suburbs Ocean Outfall Sewer was designed to serve the western suburbs of Sydney. The line extended from the Rockdale end of the Arncliffe sewerage farm (enlarged for the scheme) to the sewer penstock at Premier Street, Marrickville. The contract necessitated the construction of aqueducts over the Cooks River, Wolli Creek and at Arncliffe between Rocky Point Road (Princess Highway) and Illawarra Road (Arncliffe Street) and extensive tunnelling.

The work was undertaken in two contracts relating to the different construction types. The contract for the aqueducts was let to J. F. Carson. The design details of the aqueduct are the same for that of the aqueduct at Cooks River, except for the amendment to include a subway for pedestrians at the southern terminus of the arches at Arncliffe Road (now Turrella Street). Also constructed here was brick semi-circular abutment to the embankment. The original design of the aqueduct provided for a triplicate 1.8-metre (6 ft) diameter wrought iron sewer (although only two pipes were initially laid), carried on 170 metres (560 ft) of segmental 17 brick arches of approximately 9.8-metre (32 ft) span, two 24-metre (80 ft) by 7.6-metre (25 ft) steel lattice girder bridge spans, and 24 metres (80 ft) of a series of mass concrete arches within embankment.

The total length of the aqueduct is approximately 220 metres (720 ft). The bridge spans are of mild steel riveted construction, the sewer carrier pipes being carried on cross beams on two simple lattice girders (on trusses), with a series of small cross lattice girders for wind bracing. The bridge spans are supported on two metal circular piers. The piers of the brick arches are constructed from mass concrete, faced in decorative brick and dressed sandstone and seated on mass concrete foundations founded on a raft of timber piles. The arches are a combination of brick and mass concrete construction. The two original sewer carrier pipes were fabricated from wrought iron and riveted.

Expansion joints of 1.8 metres (6 ft) sections were installed at the junction of the brick arches and the steel lattice bridge and, at the Turrella Street terminus, and above the ninth arch south of the bridge. The third (western) pipe of welded mild steel was laid in 1929. The original pipes have been maintained over the years to present, with selective replacement of defective sections.

The Wolli Creek aqueduct is one of six sewage aqueducts in Sydney completed in the period 1895–1901. Others include the reinforced concrete Monier arches at Whites Creek and Johnstons Creek (1897), the mass concrete/brick arches and iron pipe at Cooks River (1895), the Mosman Bay steel arch (1901), and the stone/concrete and steel pipe at Lewisham (1900).

== Description ==
The aqueduct comprises the sewer carrier of three 1.8-metre (5 ft 11 in) diameter wrought iron and steel pipes supported on a series of brick arches, and steel bridges. The brick arches are particularly decorative, being white glazed face bricks laid in English bond with decorative motifs picked out in a red coloured brick. The springing points of the arch and cornice are in dressed sandstone. Access to this viaduct in general is difficult, and the exact configuration of the structure not easy to determine, but the carrier emerges from a brick northern abutment below Unwin Street, Undercliffe (known as Unwin's Hill) crossing the creek by the steel trusses and then continuing by the brick arches passing under the East Hills railway to arches and embankment at Turrella and Knoll Streets, Turrella. The aqueduct is a large and impressive built structure situated across the expanse of the Wolli Creek valley.

=== Modifications and dates ===
The barrels were overhauled between 1981 and 1984, and the surface of the cast iron pipes was coated with a modern fibre-glass lining. The steelwork on the two bridge spans has been replaced where necessary. Fencing at either end of the carrier to prevent trespass.

== Heritage listing ==
As at 22 June 2005, the Wolli Creek Valley sewage aqueduct was an integral and visibly strong component of the original Western Main Carrier (now part of Southern and Western Suburbs Ocean Outfall Sewer System), which was one of the Board's major early sewerage schemes. The aqueduct being a combination of brick arches and steel bridges, is an excellent and rare example of a late-nineteenth steel truss bridge (in non railway construction) and decorative face brick work in NSW. The two original sewer carriers are likely to be rare examples of large diameter, long run wrought iron pipes used for such a purpose. Elements of significance are its past and ongoing use, technologies of construction, and setting within the valley of Wolli Creek.

Wolli Creek Aqueduct was listed on the New South Wales State Heritage Register on 18 November 1999 having satisfied the following criteria:

- The place is important in demonstrating the course, or pattern, of cultural or natural history in New South Wales.

The Wolli Creek sewage aqueduct is an integral and visible component of Western Main Carrier system which subsequently evolved into the Southern and Western Suburbs Ocean Outfall Sewer System. The aqueduct was designed by Robert Hickson, who was a foundation Board member of Sydney Water.

- The place is important in demonstrating aesthetic characteristics and/or a high degree of creative or technical achievement in New South Wales.

The arches of the aqueduct are excellent examples of decorative face brick (in a basically utilitarian structure), which are unlikely to be built again. The setting of the lattice girder bridge is now particularly notable in the Wolli Creek basin.

- The place has a strong or special association with a particular community or cultural group in New South Wales for social, cultural or spiritual reasons.

The aqueduct is a major element of the historic built environment of the local government area of Hurstville and provides a focus for an understanding to the contemporary community of the historical development of the local area.

- The place has potential to yield information that will contribute to an understanding of the cultural or natural history of New South Wales.

The aqueduct is an excellent example of a late-nineteenth steel truss bridge (in non-railway construction). The wrought pipes are likely to be a rare example of a large diameter, long run of wrought iron pipe fabricated in 1895. The welded steel pipe of 1929 may also be of significance in consideration of the application of this technology at this early date on a pipe of this length. The face brickwork is a textbook example of the trade in a basically utilitarian structure.

- The place possesses uncommon, rare or endangered aspects of the cultural or natural history of New South Wales.

Rare in consideration of its scale, siting and mixed use of materials and construction techniques.

- The place is important in demonstrating the principal characteristics of a class of cultural or natural places/environments in New South Wales.

Representative in its function which is widespread across Sydney.

== See also ==
- Cooks River Sewage Aqueduct
