= Undercliffe, New South Wales =

Coordinates: 33°55′35″S 151°08′37″E

Undercliffe
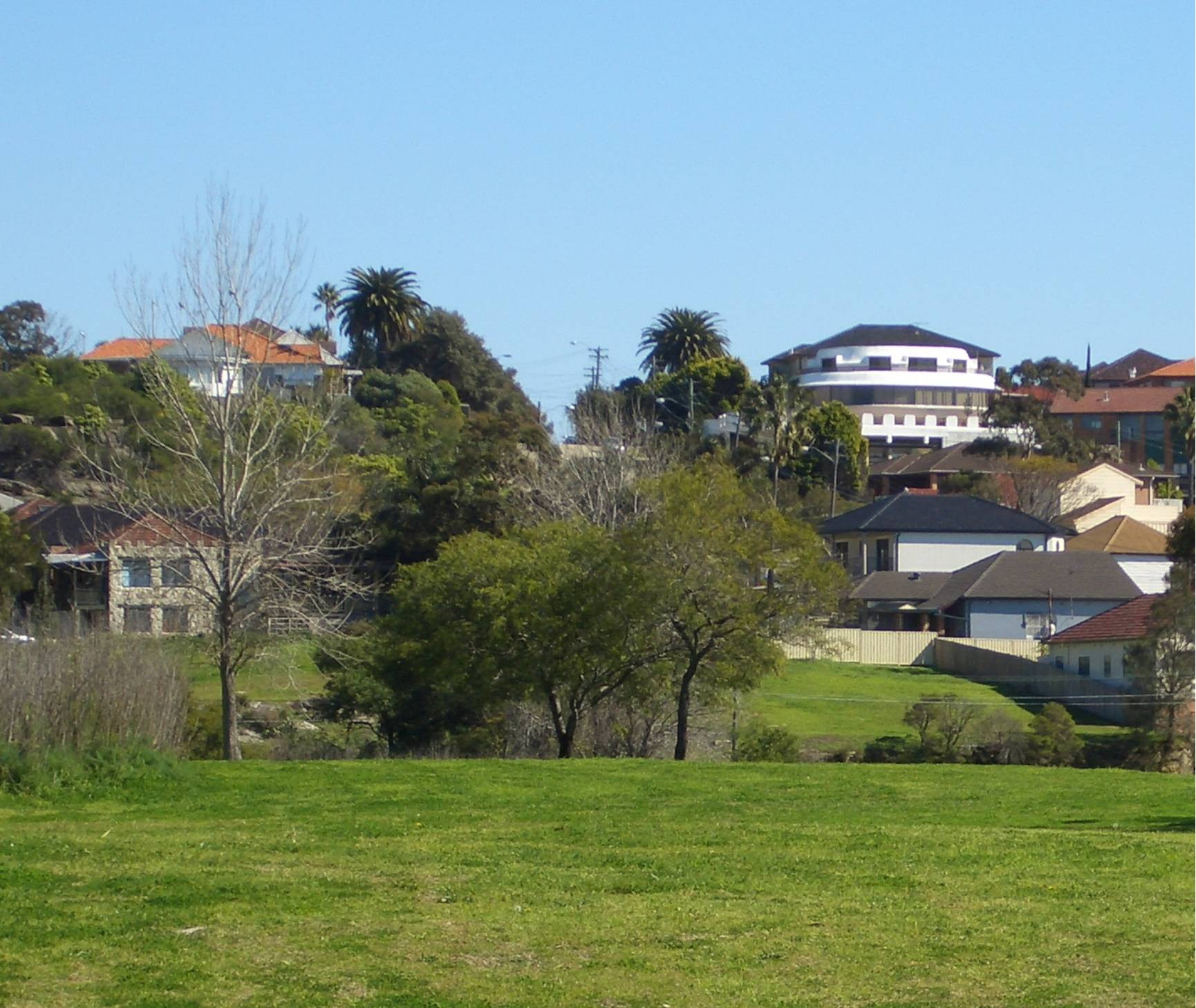
- View of Undercliffe from Waterworth Park
- Country: Australia
- State: New South Wales
- City: Sydney
- LGA: City of Canterbury-Bankstown
- Location: 10 km (6.2 mi) south-west of Sydney CBD

Government
  - State electorate: Canterbury
  - Federal division: Barton

Population
  - Total: 27 (SAL 2021)
- Postcode: 2206

Undercliffe is an eastern section of the suburb of Earlwood located in South Western Sydney, New South Wales, Australia. Undercliffe is situated 10 kilometres south-west of the Sydney central business district within the local government area of the City of Canterbury-Bankstown.

== History ==
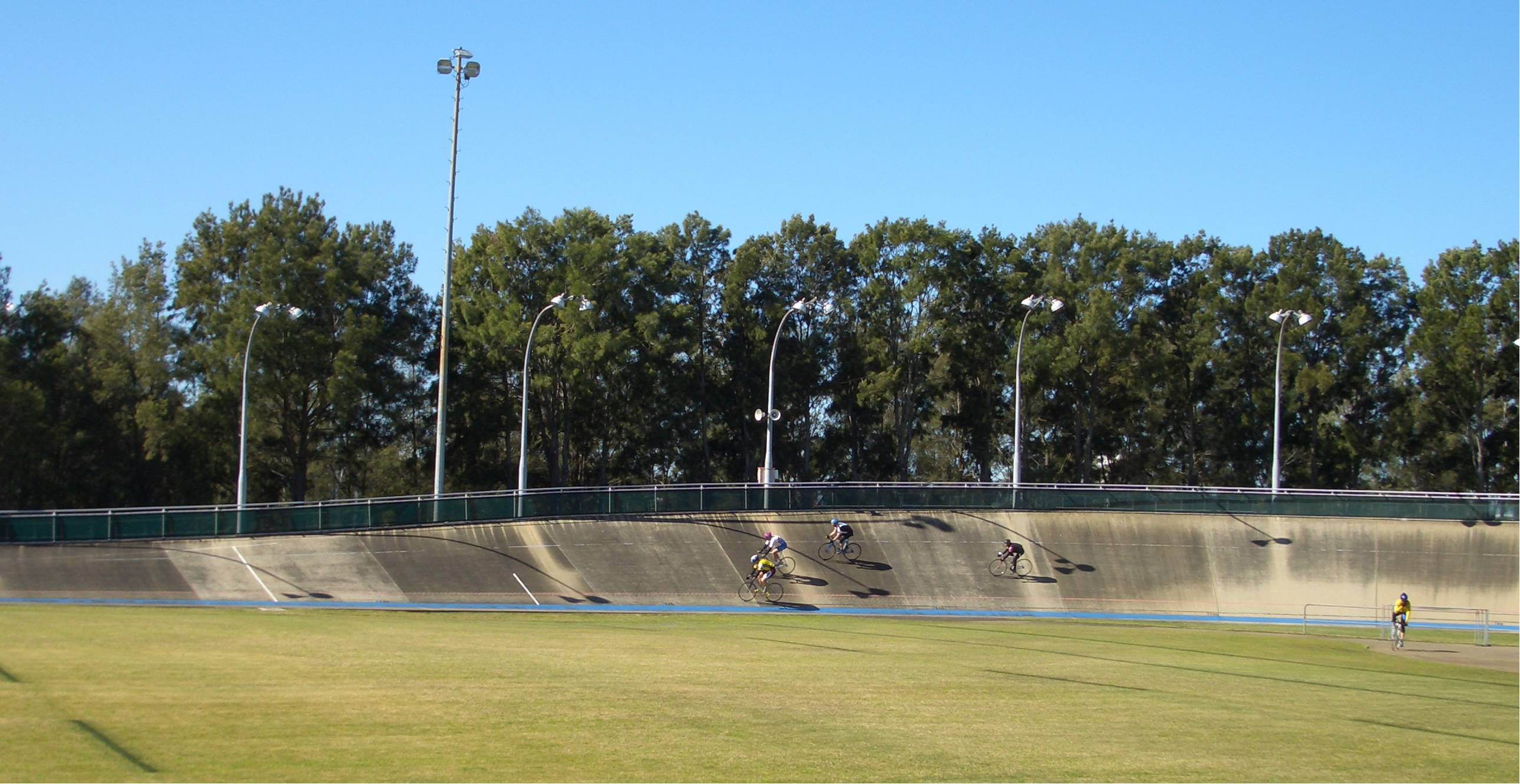
Velodrome, Waterworth Park

=== 19th Century ===
The area was initially recognised as Undercliffe Estate during the 1840s via land grant due to the presence of one or more permanent dwellings. The name is derived from the presence of a prominent outcrop of Sydney sandstone which forms the bedrock of the greater Sydney area. The quarrying of this sandstone between Wolli Creek and Cooks River provided the first local industry as well as material for the production of additional homes.

A notable landowner during this era was East India Company Judge James Donnithorne (1773–1852). Donnithorne owned shares in the Undercliffe Estate, which upon his death, were passed to his daughter Eliza Emily Donnithorne (1821–1886), a recluse who leased out the land until her death. It was then sold and eventually subdivided for housing.

A wooden bridge was built across the Cooks River in 1836 to carry the Illawarra Road across the river. It was known as Tompsons Bridge, after Mr. P. A. Tompson's father who purchased the Bexley Estate from James Chandler. The bridge was washed away several times during floods. Unwin had bought his property from Arthur Martin in 1840 and built a large home known as Wanstead, named after a village in Essex, England. Unwins Bridge, Unwins Bridge Road, Wanstead Avenue, and Wanstead Avenue Reserve commemorate these names.

=== 20th Century ===
Waterworth Park was set aside as a reserve in 1906 after it was declared unsuitable for habitation due to health concerns. Between 1912 and 1957, electric trams operated through Undercliffe along Illawarra Road and Homer Street on their way to the west of Earlwood, providing service to the city via Marrickville and Newtown. The service has since been replaced by buses.

Undercliffe was a standalone suburb of Sydney until it was merged with Earlwood in 1993.

== Geography ==
Undercliffe is a predominantly residential area. It is located on a peninsula between the Cooks River and Wolli Creek. The northern end of which is characterized by parkland and recreational areas. Bayview Avenue and Unwins Bridge link Undercliffe north over the Cooks River to Tempe. Another bridge links Illawarra Road over the Cooks River to Marrickville. Wolli Creek and Turrella are located on the opposite bank of Wolli Creek, to the south, with footbridges being the only direct links to these suburbs.

=== Notable landmarks ===
- Canterbury Velodrome at Waterworth Park
- Gough Whitlam Park
- The Transfiguration of Our Lord Greek Orthodox Church
- Undercliffe Public School

=== Heritage-listed sites ===
Undercliffe has a number of heritage-listed sites, including:

- Pine Street: Cooks River Sewage Aqueduct
- Unwin Street: Wolli Creek Aqueduct

=== Original inhabitants-listed site ===
There is an original inhabitants listed site, depicting rare hand and feet stenciling rock art, on private property and not open to the public.
