= Orphan School Creek =

Creek in inner Sydney, Australia

Coordinates: 33.882663°S 151.176219°E

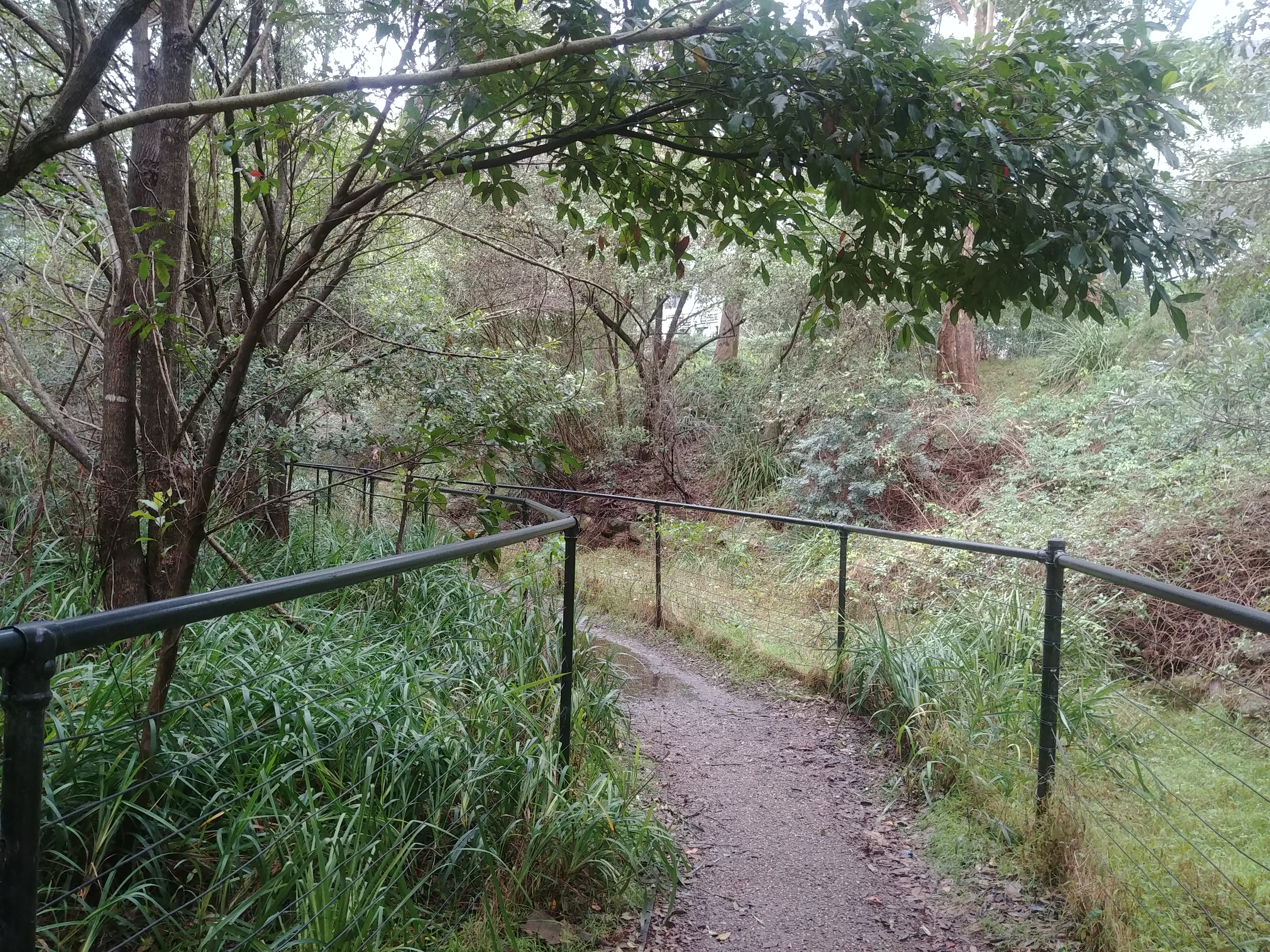
Path along the creek (which is to the right side here)

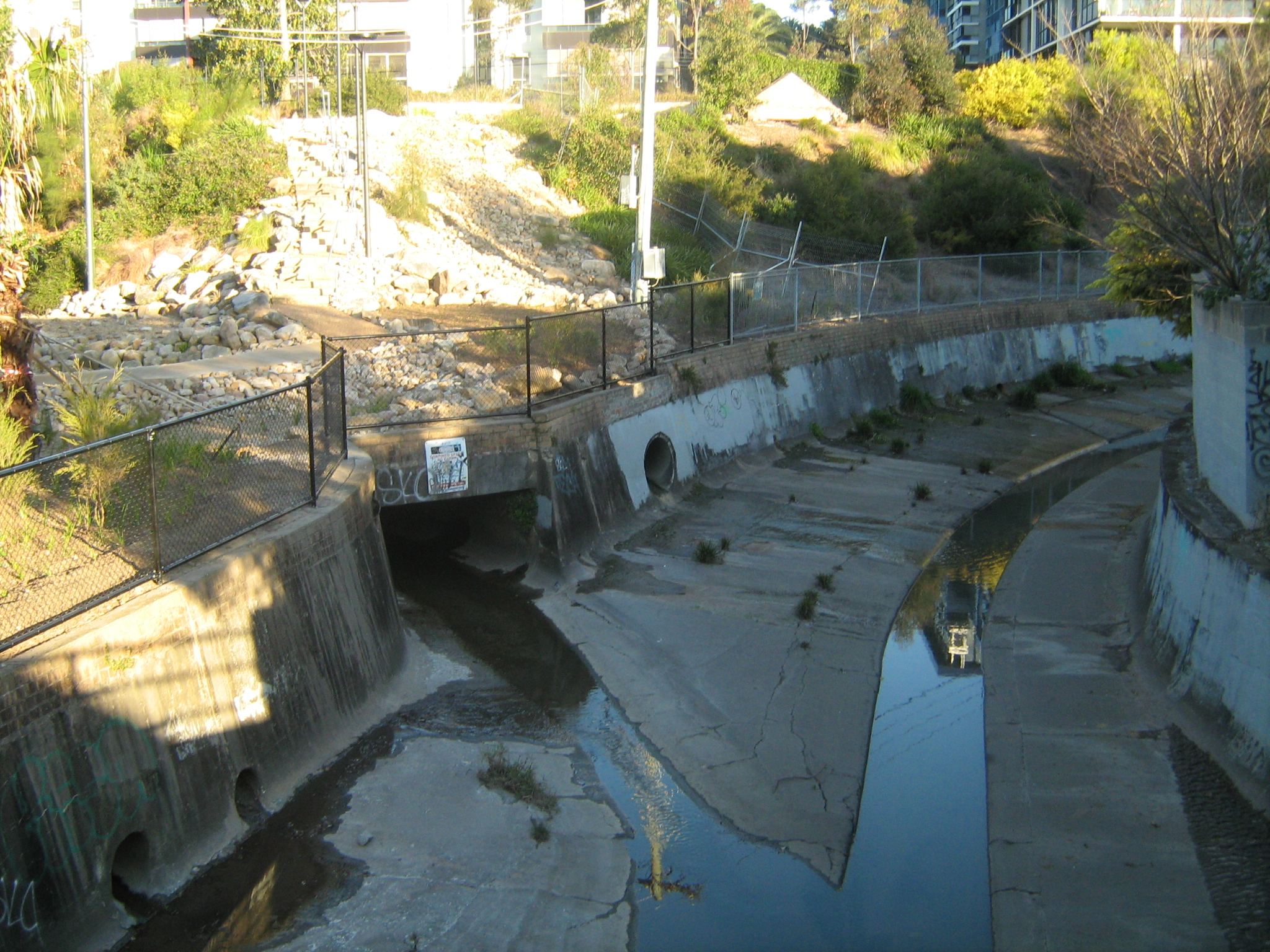
The junction of Johnstons Creek and Orphan School Creek at Camperdown

Orphan School Creek is a storm drain located in inner Sydney, New South Wales. It is a tributary of Johnstons Creek which flows into Rozelle Bay.

The creek moves through the University of Sydney and in particular in St John's college oval, at the back of Royal Prince Alfred Hospital. An old photo of Royal Prince Alfred Hospital shows the creek prior to it being turned into a storm water drain.

Much of the course of the old creek is part of a green link of parks.

== See also ==
- Whites Creek
- Johnstons Creek
- Prospect Creek
