= Rozelle Bay =

Bay in Sydney, New South Wales, Australia

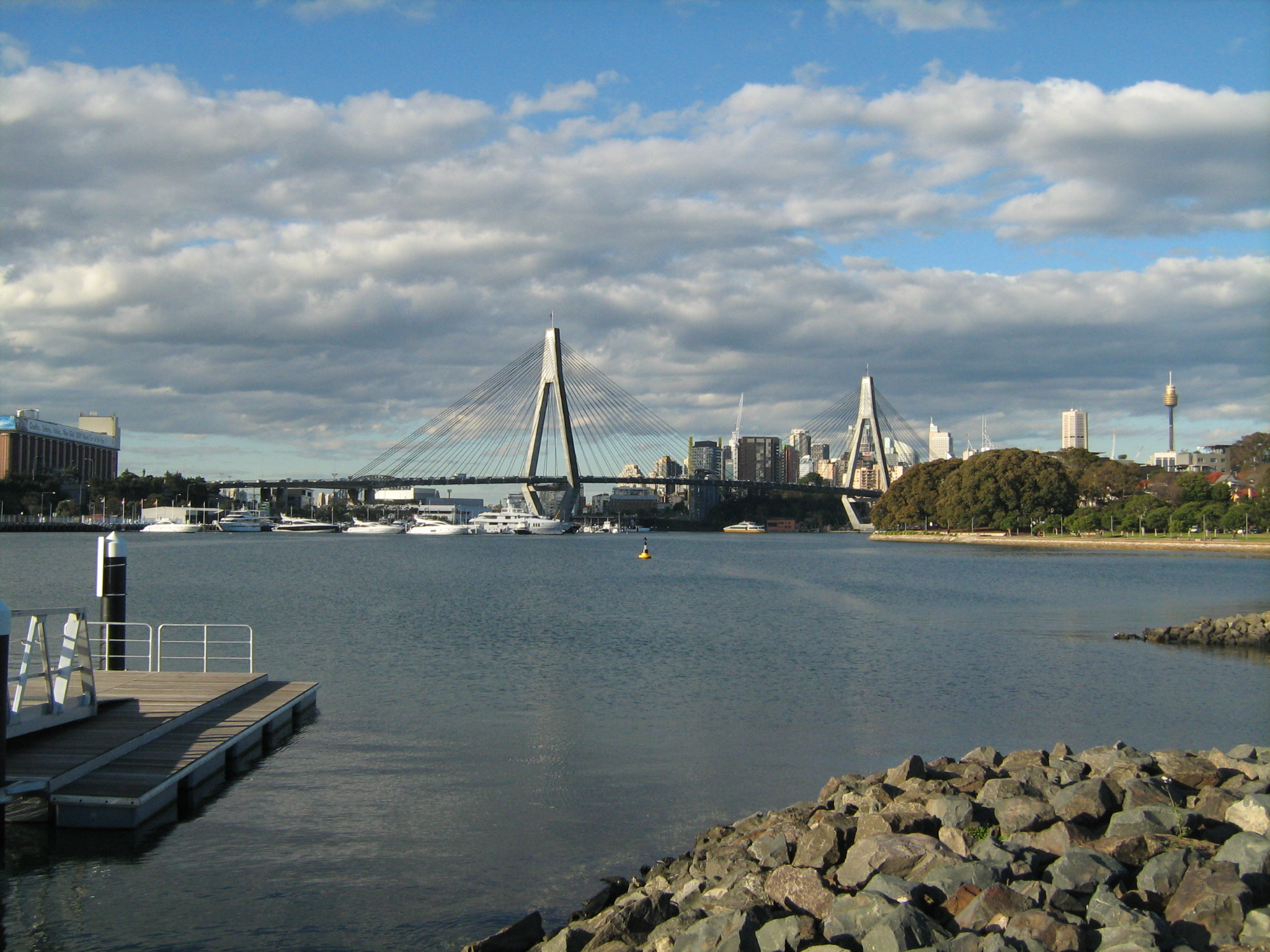
- View of Rozelle Bay and the Anzac Bridge from Federal Park.

- Location within New South Wales
- Location: Inner West, New South Wales, Australia
- Coordinates: 33°52′S 151°11′E
- Type: Bay
- Part of: Sydney Harbour
- Primary inflows: Johnstons Creek; Whites Creek
- Settlements: Sydney

Rozelle Bay is a bay located to the south of Glebe Island and the west of Blackwattle Bay, on Sydney Harbour.

The naming of the bay is derived from either the Rosella bird or the Rosella plant, with the latter being more likely, due to the other names in the area that have botanic origins.

A light rail station on the Dulwich Hill Line is named after the bay.

Rozelle Bay is fed by Johnstons Creek and Whites Creek.

The dockyard of the Sydney Heritage Fleet is located on the western shore of Rozelle Bay.

== Gallery ==
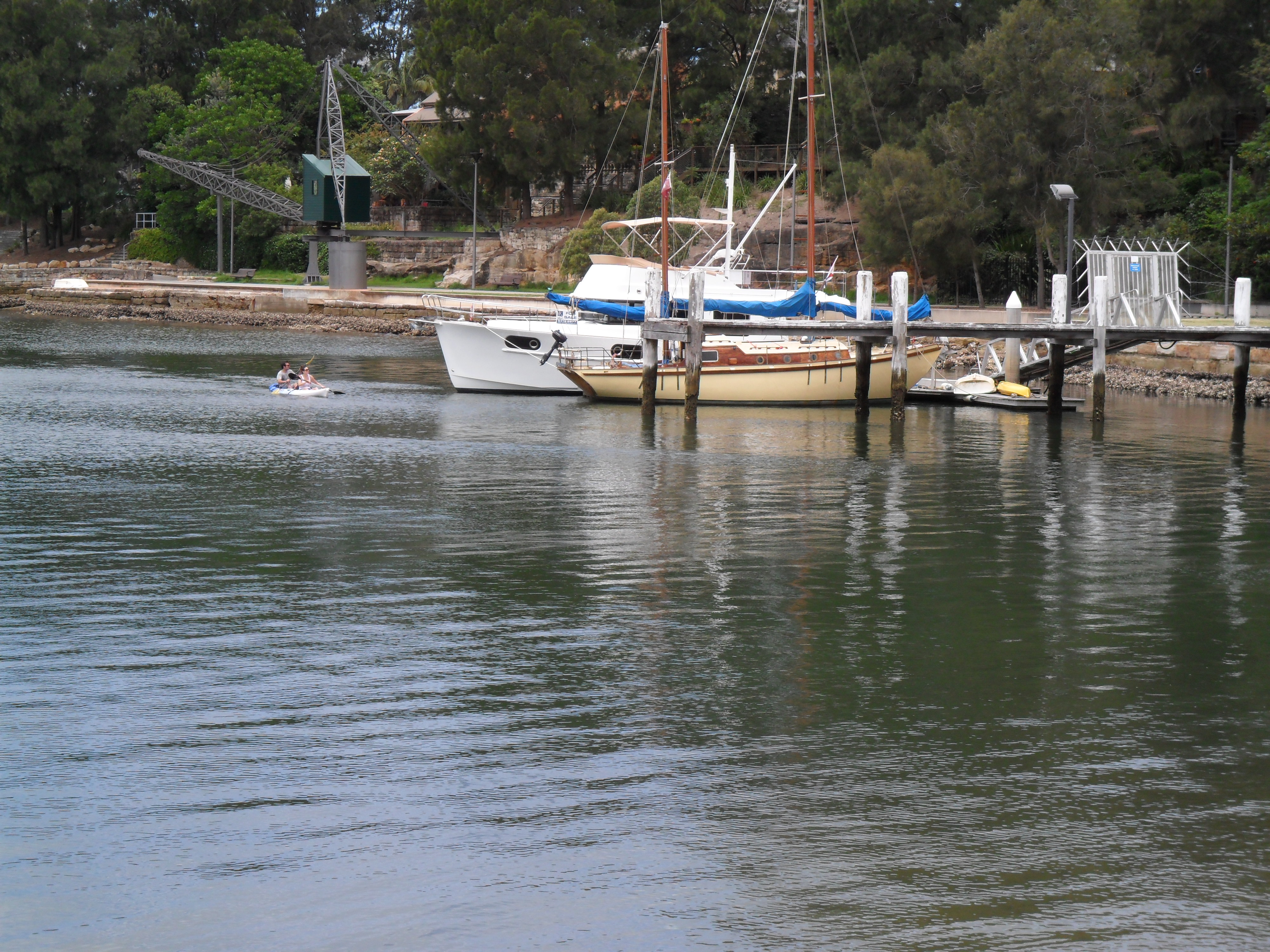
A cove of Rozelle Bay

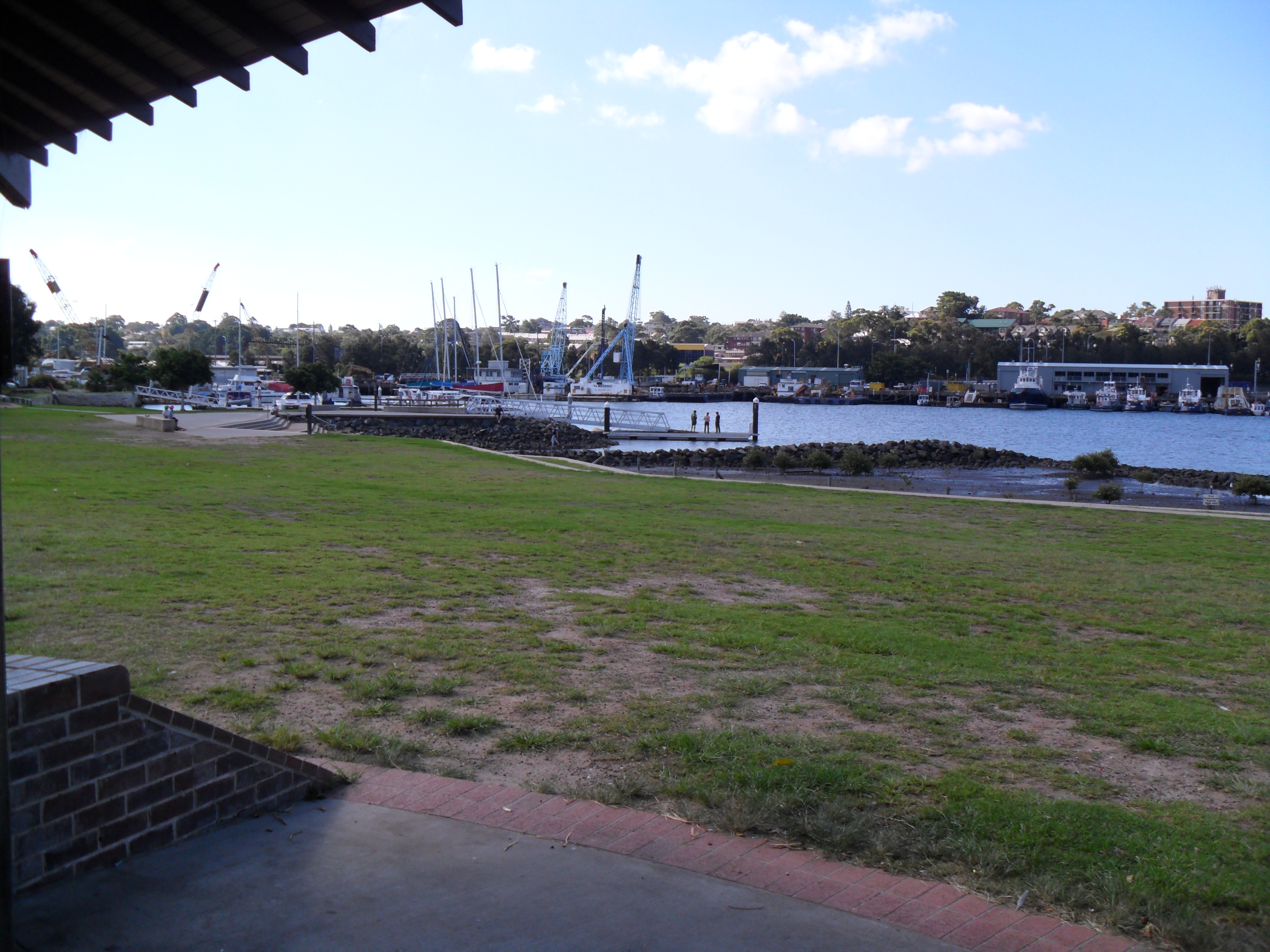
View of Rozelle Bay Marina from Esther Abrahams Pavilion

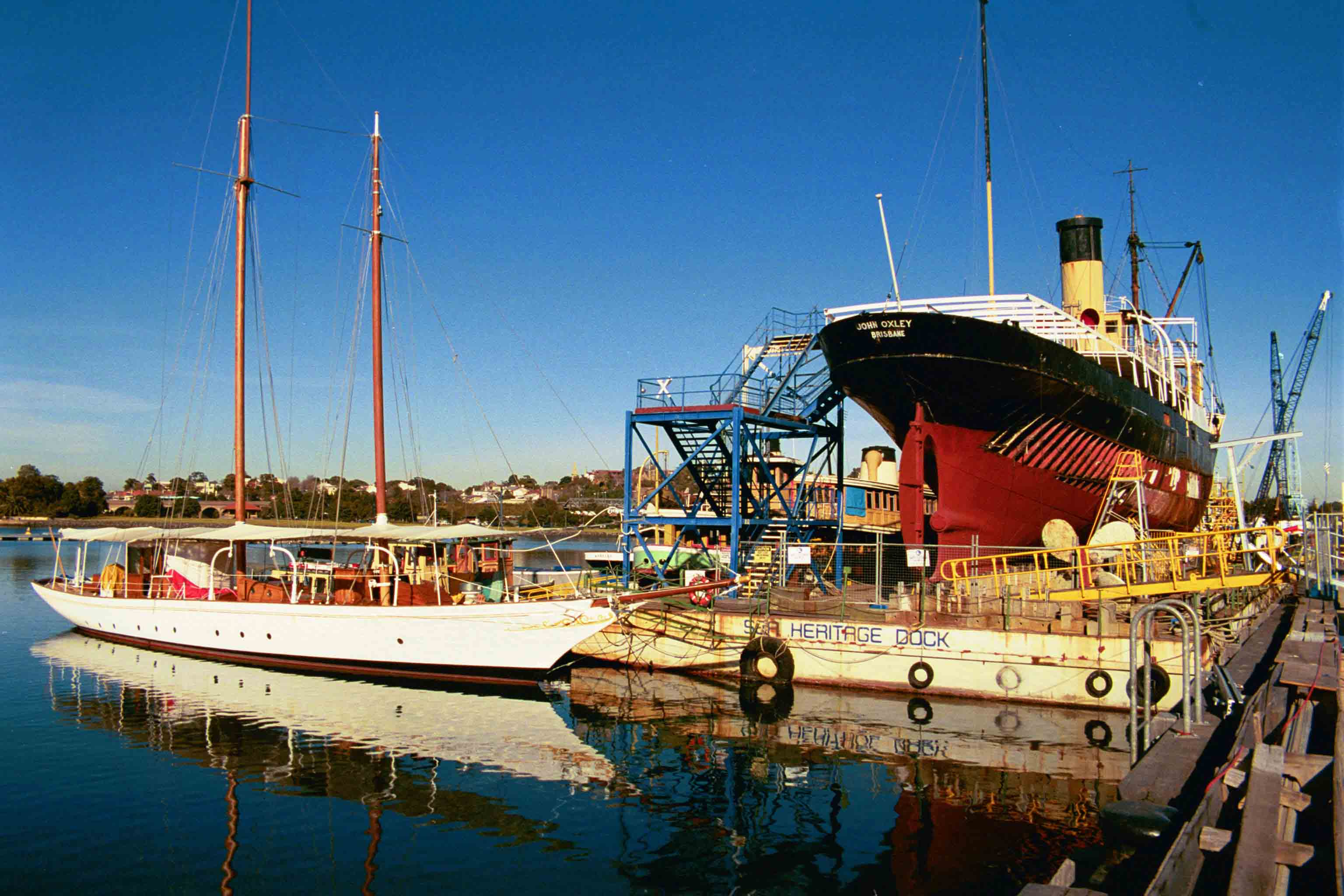
Sydney Heritage Fleet Dockyard

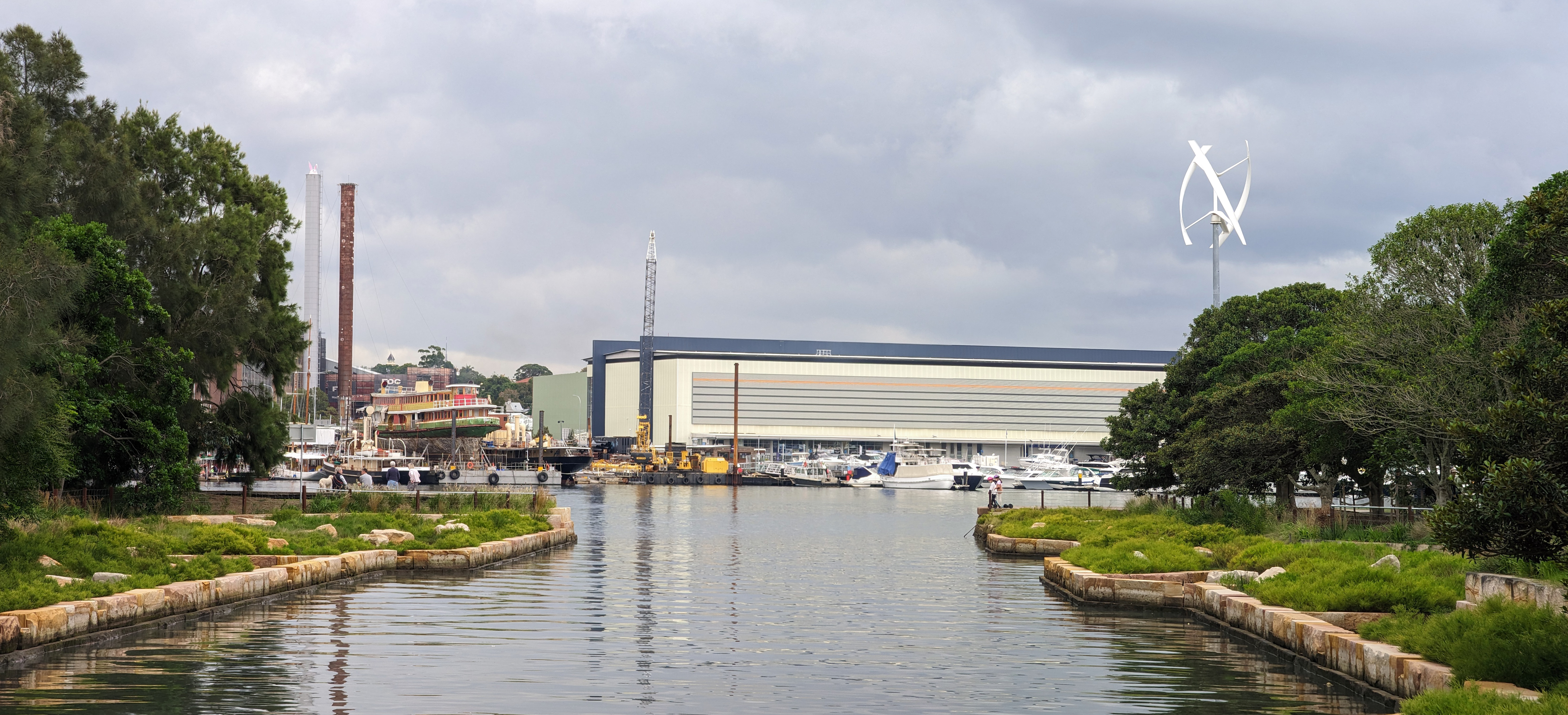
Looking across the bay, from the Allan truss bridge on Johnston Creek toward the Sydney Boathouse in Rozelle
