= Johnston's Creek Sewer Aqueduct =

Located in Sydney, Australia

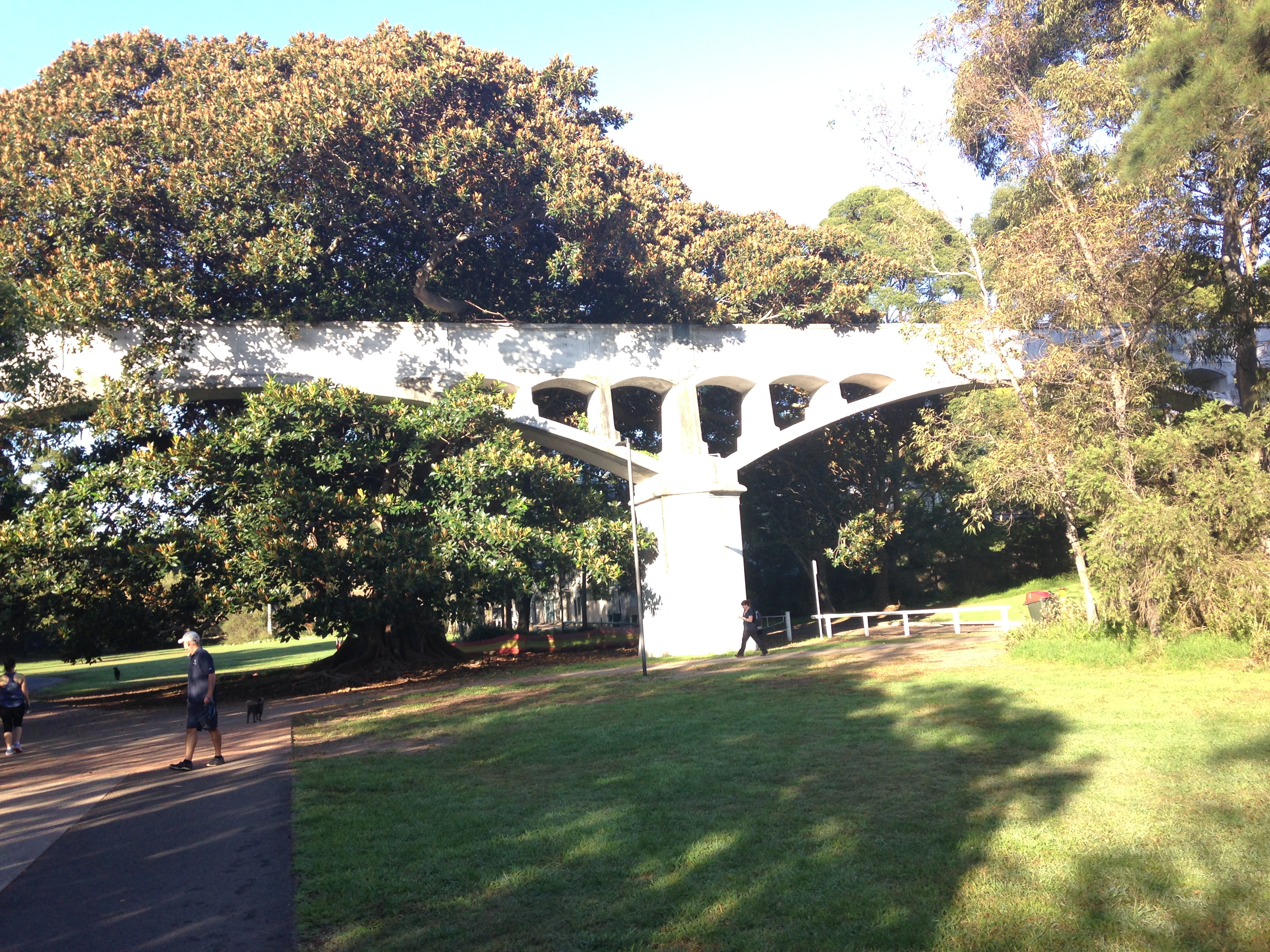
- Johnston's Creek Sewer Aqueduct, looking south

- Location within Sydney Location within Australia
- 33.8798°S 151.1758°E
- Location: off Taylor Street, Hogan Park, Annandale, Inner West Council, Sydney, New South Wales, Australia

History
- Built: 1897

Site notes
- Architect: William Julius Baltzer (Public Works Department)
- Owner: Sydney Water

New South Wales Heritage Register
- Official name: Johnston's Creek Sewer Aqueduct; Johnstons Creek Sewer Aqueduct
- Type: state heritage (built)
- Designated: 18 November 1999
- Reference no.: 1325
- Type: Sewage Aqueduct
- Category: Utilities - Sewerage
- Builders: Public Works Department

Johnston's Creek Sewer Aqueduct is a heritage-listed sewage aqueduct located in Hogan Park, off Taylor Street, Annandale, New South Wales, a suburb of Sydney, Australia. It was designed by William Julius Baltzer, an engineer in the NSW Public Works Department, and built by the Department in 1897. The property is owned by Sydney Water. It was added to the New South Wales State Heritage Register on 18 November 1999.

== History ==
The Johnstons Creek sewage aqueduct was constructed in 1897. The aqueduct was constructed as an extension of the Bondi Ocean Outfall Sewer which was then known as the Northern Main Sewer. This sewer carried sewage from the densely populated inner-western suburbs of Balmain, Annandale and Glebe. The sewer necessitated the crossing of the 'Johnstone's Creek Valley' and 'White's Creek Valley' to deliver the sewage to the ocean outfall junction at the Junction of Parramatta and City Roads. The Northern Main Sewer was one of the Board's early major sewer schemes.

The section of Northern Main Sewer, which embraces the aqueducts across Johnstone's and White's Creeks, was constructed under Government Contract No. 77 (basically the area between Catherine Street and Minogue Crescent). The design work for this contract was completed by early 1895, and which proposed the sewer be carried on mass concrete and brick arches and a lattice bridge. This scheme was subsequently abandoned in favour of using a carrier and supporting arches of reinforced concrete construction, the contract for which was let in mid 1896.

The engineer credited with the design is W. J. Baltzer, an engineer in the Sewerage Branch of the Department of Public Works. Baltzer, a graduate of a German university, worked for the firm Carter Gummow & Co. which held the patent rights for the Monier system of reinforcing concrete. Carter Gummow & Co. were instrumental in bringing reinforced concrete construction to the fore. The design provided for a sewer carrier internally U shaped in section 3-ft. 6-in (1m.) by 4 ft. 6-in (1.37 m) constructed in reinforced concrete. The sewer carrier is supported by a series of reinforced concrete arches: There are 8 large spans, each of 81-ft 10-in (25 m.) centre to centre with a clear span of 75-ft (23 m.), and a number of smaller subsidiary arches at the eastern edge. The total length is 924-ft. (281.6 m.). Each of the arches is seated on mass concrete piers.

It was repaired during the mid 1980s, consisting of the insertion of a plastic liner in the flume. The arches are in a stable condition.

== Description ==
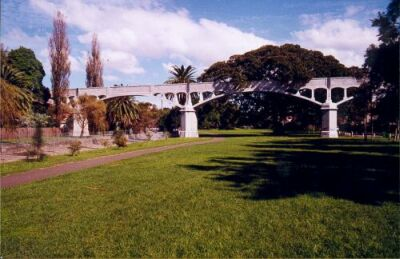
The aqueduct looking south down Hogan Park

A series of slender reinforced concrete arches supporting the reinforced concrete sewage carrier seated on substantial mass concrete piers situated across Hogan Park through which the stormwater channel of Johnstons Creek is situated. The western terminus of the aqueduct is the western side of Nelson Street (which the aqueduct crosses), where there is a concrete retaining wall and public stairs. The aqueduct then crosses the shallow valley of Johnstons Creek continuing to the eastern terminus near Taylor Street. The aqueduct is a prominent feature within Hogan Park. There is a mature fig street situated close to one of the main central spans, its canopy encroaching over the sewer carrier.

== Heritage listing ==
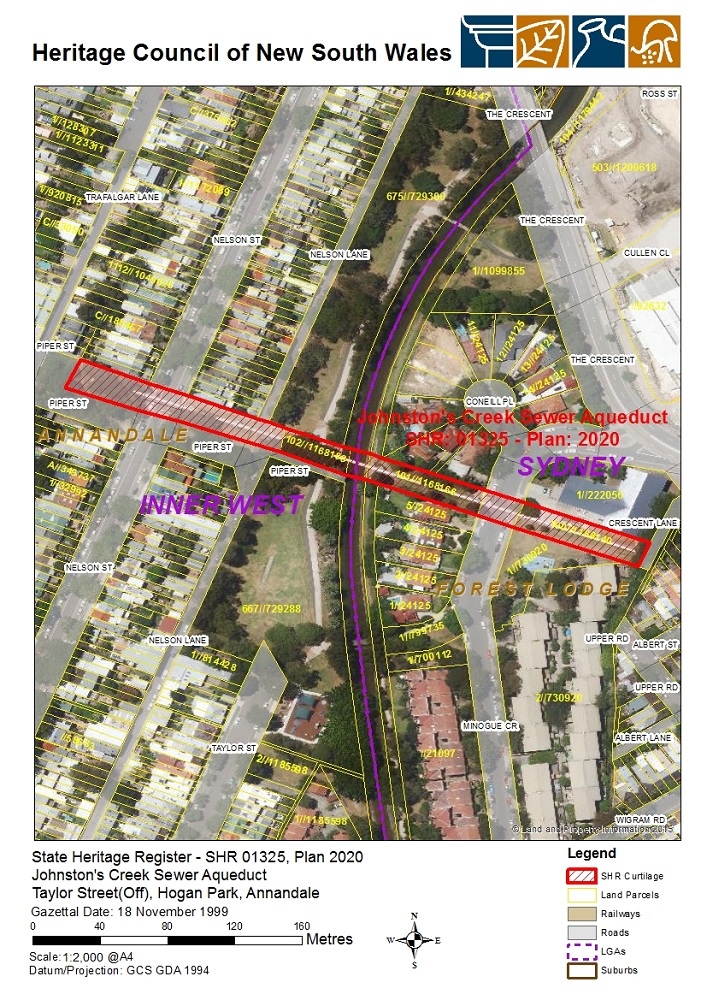
Heritage boundaries

The Johnstons Creek sewage aqueduct was completed in 1897 and is a major and visibly strong component of the Northern Main Sewer extension of the Bondi Ocean Outfall Sewer. The aqueduct arches and carrier are one of the first major constructions undertaken using reinforced concrete in NSW and one of the first in Australia. The slender proportions of the supporting arches and sewage carrier along with its historic technological value are a major landmark for Sydney. The aqueduct is a major element of the historic built environment of the local area, and a long held part of the recreational reserve . The significant elements are its location within a park setting, technology of construction and past and ongoing use.

Johnston's Creek Sewer Aqueduct was listed on the New South Wales State Heritage Register on 18 November 1999 having satisfied the following criteria.

The place is important in demonstrating the course, or pattern, of cultural or natural history in New South Wales.

The aqueduct is particularly associated with the engineer W. J. Baltzer, and the firm Carter Gummow & Co. early advocates of the use of reinforced concrete (the Monier system) in this country, of which this is one. The Johnstons Creek sewage aqueduct is a major and highly visible component of the Northern Main Sewer extension of the Bondi Ocean Outfall Sewer completed in 1897. The extension provided for the sewerage of the areas of densely populated inner-western suburbs of Balmain, Annandale and Glebe.

The place is important in demonstrating aesthetic characteristics and/or a high degree of creative or technical achievement in New South Wales.

The sewage aqueduct is a prominent element in the historic built environment of Leichhardt and Forest Lodge. The aqueduct in consideration of its length, height and slender proportions is an impressive sight, and a landmark in Sydney.

The place has a strong or special association with a particular community or cultural group in New South Wales for social, cultural or spiritual reasons.

The aqueduct is a major element of the historic built environment of the local government area of Leichhardt and provides a focusfor the contemporary community for an understanding of the historical development of the local area. It is listed by authorities such as the National Trust of Australia (NSW), the Australian Heritage Commission, and the Institution of Engineers (Australia).

The place has potential to yield information that will contribute to an understanding of the cultural or natural history of New South Wales.

The aqueduct is one of the first major constructions undertaken using reinforced concrete in NSW and one of the first in Australia. The built fabric is therefore a unique repository for the study of the early development of reinforced construction.

The place possesses uncommon, rare or endangered aspects of the cultural or natural history of New South Wales.

It is rare in Australia in consideration of the extent and date of the reinforced construction technique.

The place is important in demonstrating the principal characteristics of a class of cultural or natural places/environments in New South Wales.

It is representative in its function which is widespread across Sydney.

== Engineering heritage ==
The aqueduct received a Historic Engineering Marker from Engineers Australia as part of its Engineering Heritage Recognition Program.

== See also ==
- White's Creek Aqueduct
