= White's Creek Aqueduct =

Heritage-listed sewage aqueduct in Sydney, Australia

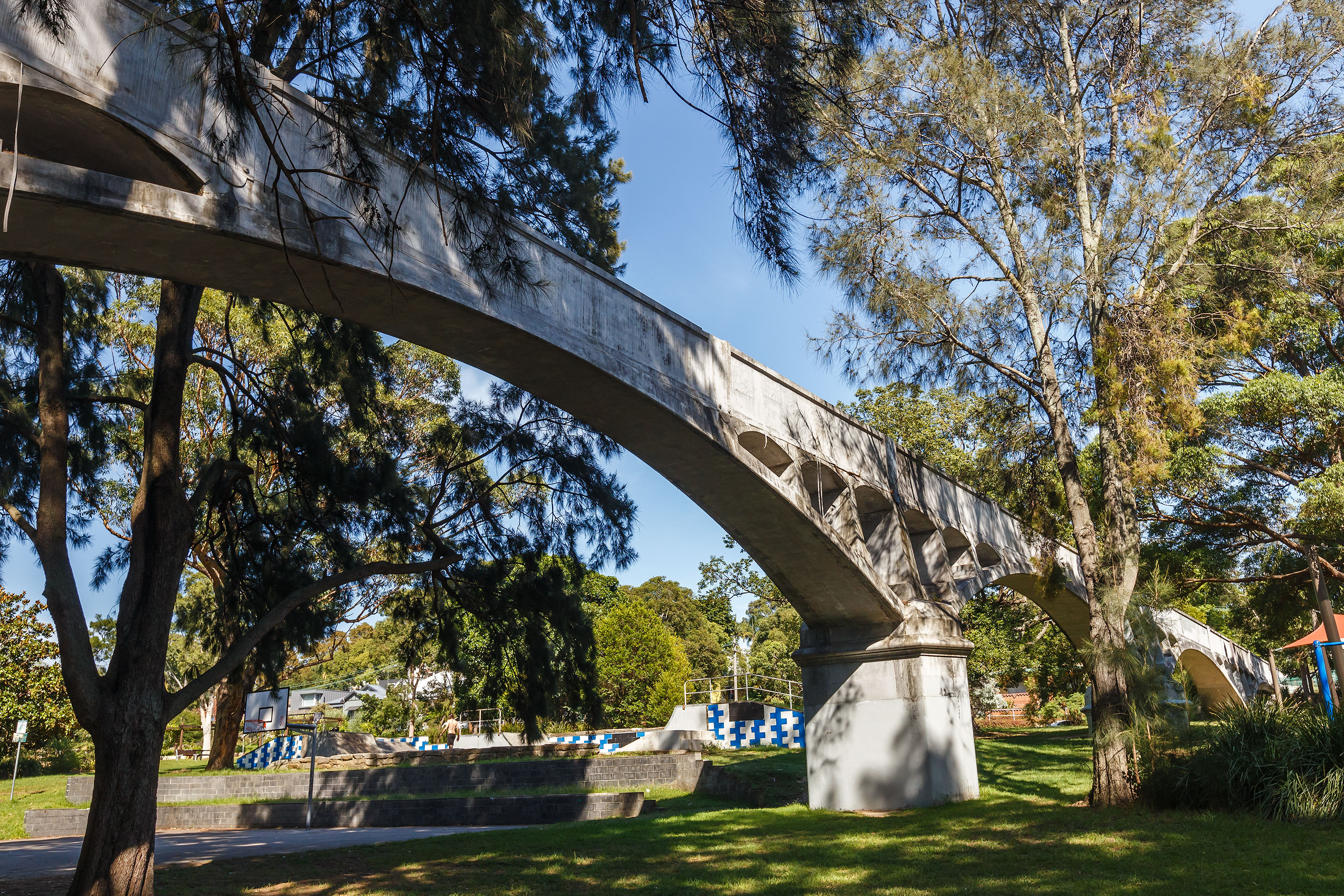
- White's Creek Aqueduct viewed from the north side.

- Location within Sydney Location within Australia
- 33.8776°S 151.1680°E
- Location: Piper Street, Lilyfield, Inner West Council, Sydney, New South Wales, Australia

History
- Built: 1897–1898

Site notes
- Architect: William Julius Baltzer (Public Works Department)
- Owner: Sydney Water

New South Wales Heritage Register
- Official name: White's Creek Aqueduct; Whites Creek Aqueduct
- Type: state heritage (built)
- Designated: 18 November 1999
- Reference no.: 1354
- Type: Sewage Aqueduct
- Category: Utilities – Sewerage
- Builders: Public Works Department

White's Creek Aqueduct is a heritage-listed sewage aqueduct at Piper Street, Lilyfield, Inner West Council, Sydney, New South Wales, Australia. It was designed by engineer William Julius Baltzer of the New South Wales Public Works Department and built by the Department from 1897 to 1898. The property is owned by Sydney Water. It was added to the New South Wales State Heritage Register on 18 November 1999.

== History ==
Lilyfield was first developed as large rural estates granted to prominent early settlers between 1794 and 1819. The area comprising the subject site was part of 165 acres granted to John Piper in 1811. Like many original grantees here, Piper did not occupy the land. In the 1870s intensive subdivision of the large Leichhardt estates began. By 1875 the main street network, including White Street and Piper Street, was firmly established. Lilyfield however remained a suburban frontier until the early 20th century.

During the 1880s Sydney was expanding rapidly due to the boom conditions and large influx of immigrants. Public works, such as water supply and sewerage schemes, were a major feature of these hectic years. When the large sewer main was planned in 1883 to drain most of the suburbs on the southern side of the harbour to the Bondi Outfall, it was found necessary to carry a branch sewer to service the western areas.

On 25 April 1892 the Minister for Public Works resumed a parcel of land (2 roods and 29 perches) on the southern side of Piper Street for carrying out the upstream extension of the Northern Main Sewer. The Whites Creek sewer aqueduct was completed in 1897. It was constructed as an extension of the Bondi Ocean Outfall Sewer, then known as the Northern Main Sewer. This carried sewage from the densely populated inner-western suburbs of Balmain, Annandale and Glebe. The sewer necessitated the crossing of the 'Johnstone's Creek Valley' and 'White's Creek Valley' to deliver the sewage to the ocean outfall junction at the Junction of Parramatta and City Roads.

The Main Northern Sewer was one of the Board's major early sewer systems. The section of Northern Main Sewer, which embraces the aqueducts across Johnstone's and White's Creeks, was constructed under Government Contract No. 77 (basically the area between Catherine Street and Minogue Crescent). The design work for this contract was completed by early 1895. This proposed a sewer carrier supported on mass concrete and brick arches, and a lattice bridge.

This scheme was subsequently abandoned in favour of using a carrier and supporting arches of reinforced concrete construction, the contract for which was let in mid 1896. The engineer credited with the design is W. J. Baltzer, an engineer in the Sewerage Branch of the Department of Public Works. Baltzer, a graduate of a German university, worked for the firm Carter Gummow & Co. which held the patent rights for the Monier system of reinforcing concrete. Carter Gummow & Co were instrumental in bringing reinforced construction into widespread use. The design provided for a sewer carrier internally U shaped in section 3-ft. 6-in (1m.) by 4 ft. 6-in (1.37 m) constructed in reinforced concrete. The sewer carrier is supported by a series of arches: there are 9 large spans, each of 81-ft 10-in (25 m.) centre to centre with a clear span of 75-ft (23 m.), and a number of smaller subsidiary arches at the western edge. The total length is 990-ft. (301.7 m.). Each of the arches is seated on mass concrete piers.

The aqueduct has required only minor repairs in the first 90 years of its existence. The first major renovation of the Monier arch aqueducts was necessary in 1986, when it was fitted with a new liner.

Since 1990 the aqueduct has been listed on the NSW State Heritage Register, Register of the National Estate, Leichhardt Local Environmental Plan, Sydney Water Corporation's section 170 Heritage & Conservation Register and classified by the National Trust of Australia (NSW) in recognition of its significant technical accomplishment and as a major element of the historic built environment.

The western section of the original site (21 & 1/2 perches) was transferred to the Municipality of Leichhardt in 1926 for widening of Edna Street. The remaining area (2 roods & 6 3/4 perches) accommodates the underground section of the structure and has been used for Sydney Water operations as a maintenance depot.

The aqueduct has required only minor repairs in the first 90 years of its existence.

It was repaired c. 1986, consisting of the insertion of a plastic liner in the flume. The arches are in a stable condition.

== Description ==
The White's Creek Aqueduct is an original key component of the upstream extension of the BOOS (then called the Main Northern Sewer). It presently carries the sewage derived from the Balmain/Annandale areas across Whites Creek on its journey to the ocean at Bondi. Externally, it has a rectangular conduit with an internal U shape approx. 0.9 metres (2 ft 11 in) wide by approx. 1.2 metres (3 ft 11 in) deep, and is carried by eight main brick arches, each of 25.6 metres (84 ft) centre to centre, and a number of minor arches. The total length of the span is 15 chains. The boundary of the structure forms a triangle giving a maximum of 2 metres (6 ft 7 in) clearance form the external edges of the structure.

This channel drains an area of 262 hectares (650 acres) lying to the south of Rozelle Bay and is located approximately between Balmain Road, Leichhardt and Johnston Street, Annandale. The catchment area of the channel is comprised within the Municipalities of Leichhardt and Marrickville. From the outlet in Rozelle Bay the drain proceeds in a meandering course in a southerly direction crossing Brennan, Piper, Booth, Styles and Albion Streets before terminating at Parramatta Road. The channel is 3.92 kilometres (2.44 mi) in length and is predominantly brick (56%) and concrete (42%) in fabric. The channel cross section is composed of the following; circular (38%), covered (30%) and open channel (27%). The main channel has the following Branches stemming from it; Piper Street, Moore Street Styles Street and Parramatta Road. The size of the channel outlet is 7.4 by 1.3 metres (24.3 by 4.3 ft).

Part of the stormwater drain runs through Whites Creek Valley Park, a picturesque recreational area. Various bridges are built over the channel and they add to the historic and aesthetic values of the drain. In addition the highly significant Whites Creek Aqueduct (Bondi sewer) passes overhead.

== Heritage listing ==
The Whites Creek sewage aqueduct was completed in 1897 and is a major and highly visible component of the Northern Main Sewer extension of the Bondi Ocean Outfall Sewer. The arches and carrier of the aqueduct are one of the first major constructions undertaken using reinforced concrete in NSW and one of the first in Australia. The slender proportions of the supporting arches and sewage carrier along with its historical technology value are a major landmark for Sydney. The aqueduct is a major element of the historic built environment of the local area, and a long held part of the recreational reserve. Elements of significance are the past and ongoing use, technology of construction and setting (inclusive of views) within the park reserve.

White's Creek Aqueduct was listed on the New South Wales State Heritage Register on 18 November 1999 having satisfied the following criteria.

The place is important in demonstrating the course, or pattern, of cultural or natural history in New South Wales.

The Whites Creek sewage aqueduct is a major and highly visible component of the Northern Main Sewer extension of the Bondi Ocean Outfall Sewer completed in 1897. The extension provided for the sewerage of the areas of densely populated inner-western suburbs of Balmain, Annandale and Glebe. The aqueduct is particularly associated with the engineer W. J. Baltzer, and the firm Carter Gummow & Co. early advocates of the use of reinforced concrete (the Monier system) in this country of which this is one.

The place is important in demonstrating aesthetic characteristics and/or a high degree of creative or technical achievement in New South Wales.

The sewage aqueduct is a prominent element in the historic built environment of Annandale. The aqueduct in consideration of its length, height and slender proportions is an impressive sight, and a landmark in Sydney.

The place has a strong or special association with a particular community or cultural group in New South Wales for social, cultural or spiritual reasons.

The aqueduct is a major element of the historic built environment of the local government area of Leichhardt and provides a focus for an understanding to the contemporary community of the historical development of the local area. It is listed by the National Trust of Australia (NSW), the Australian Heritage Commission, and the Institution of Engineers.

The place has potential to yield information that will contribute to an understanding of the cultural or natural history of New South Wales.

The aqueduct is one of the first major constructions undertaken using reinforced concrete in NSW and one of the first in Australia. The built fabric is therefore a unique repository for the study of the early development of reinforced construction.

The place possesses uncommon, rare or endangered aspects of the cultural or natural history of New South Wales.

Rare in Australia in consideration of the extent and date of the reinforced construction technique.

The place is important in demonstrating the principal characteristics of a class of cultural or natural places/environments in New South Wales.

Representative in its function which is widespread across Sydney.

== See also ==
- Johnston's Creek Sewer Aqueduct
