= Johnstons Creek (New South Wales) =

Coordinates: 34°36′S 150°35′E

Johnstons Creek Johnston's Creek
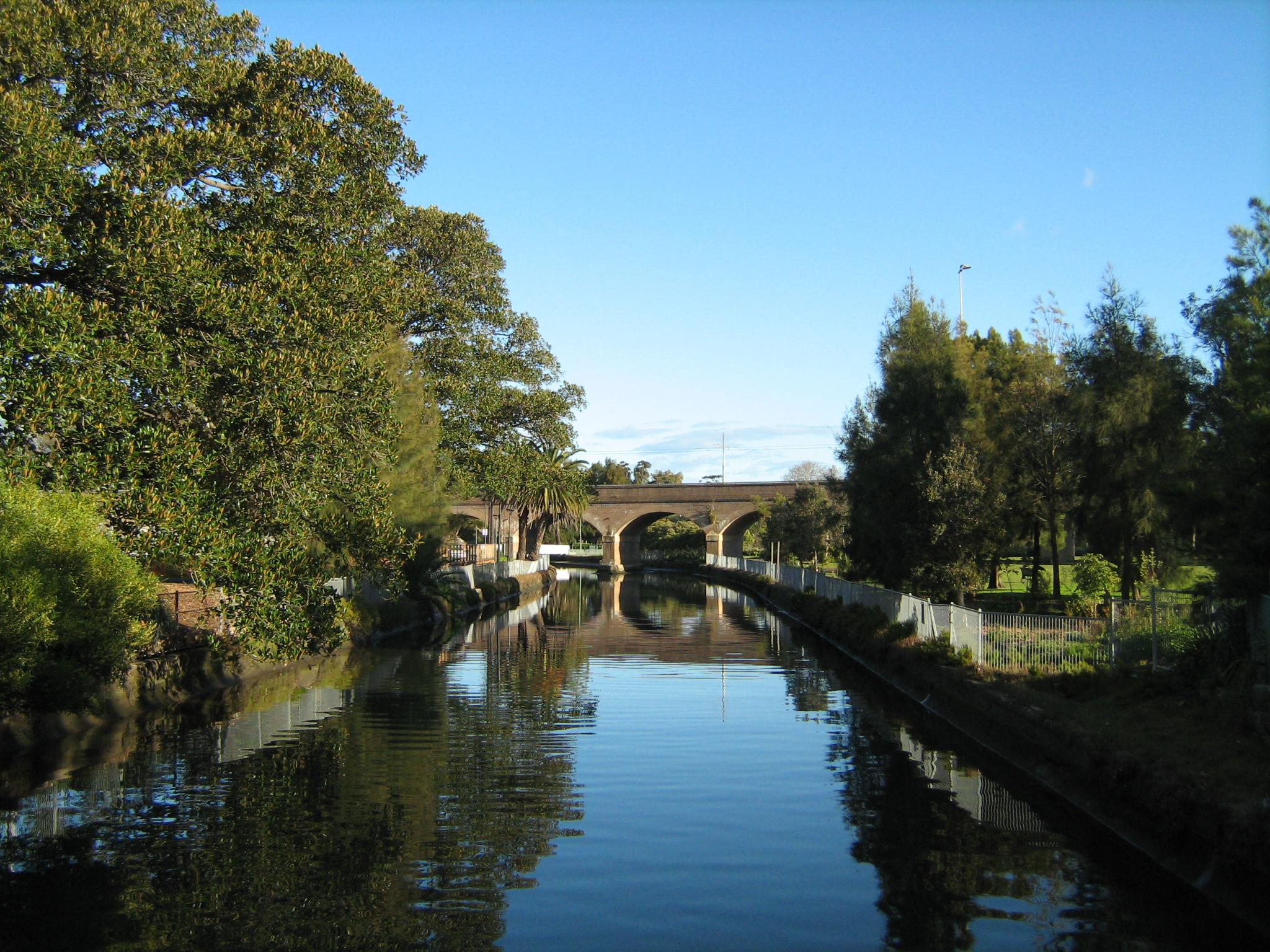
- Johnstons Creek from the footbridge between Federal and Bicentennial Parks.
- Etymology: In honour of Lieutenant-Colonel George Johnston

Location
- Country: Australia
- State: New South Wales
- Region: Sydney basin (IBRA), Sydney, Inner West
- Council: Inner West, Sydney

Physical characteristics
- Source
  - location: Petersham
- Mouth: Johnstons Bay
  - location: Rozelle Bay
  - coordinates: -33.88052611035927, 151.17586528757025

Basin features
- River system: Port Jackson/Sydney Harbour
- Tributaries
  - right: Orphan School Creek

Johnstons Creek, formerly Johnston's Creek, is an urban gully, located in Sydney, Australia and situated in the Inner West and Sydney local government areas. The creek flows from Petersham, past Annandale, Camperdown, Forest Lodge and Harold Park, before spilling into Rozelle Bay, within Sydney Harbour.

== Course and features ==
Originally a natural watercourse, Johnston's Creek was converted into a brick and concrete channel in the 1890s in order to improve sanitation in Sydney. The creek rises in Petersham and initially marked the eastern boundary of the land granted to Lieutenant-Colonel George Johnston in the 1790s, which he named Annandale. The Annandale Estate was subdivided in the latter part of the 19th Century into what is now the suburbs of Stanmore and Annandale. The channel now forms a boundary of Annandale, Forest Lodge, Camperdown and Stanmore.

Johnstons Creek has one minor tributary, Orphan School Creek, an urban canal that joins Johnstons Creek at Forest Lodge.

=== Urban structures ===
Johnstons Creek is crossed by the Annandale Bridge on Parramatta Road, and road bridges at Booth Street and The Crescent. The heritage-listed Allan Truss Bridge, formerly the Federal Road Bridge, crosses Johnstons Creek near its mouth, connecting Annandale and Glebe. The bridge was decommissioned for road usage and converted as a footbridge in 2000. A small pedestrian and road bridge crosses the canal at Harold Park, and a former tram bridge provides a direct route from Minogue Crescent to Hogan and Spindler Park. The Bowstring Bridge, a footbridge, is an early example of reinforced concrete bowstring arch bridges built in Australia, located on Minogue Crescent, Forest Lodge.

A heavy rail viaduct, now used for the Inner West Light Rail, crosses the creek between Jubilee Park and Federal Park, west of Glebe.

Completed in 1898, the Johnston's Creek Sewer Aqueduct connects Sydney's western suburbs to the Northern Main Sewer extension of the Bondi Ocean Outfall Sewer, managed by Sydney Water. The Johnston's and White's Creek Aqueducts, both listed on the Register of the National Estate, were the first reinforced concrete structures in Australia.

A salt marsh wetland was constructed in 2001 to filter storm water before it enters Sydney Harbour via Johnston's Creek.

In 2020 Sydney Water started a major project to naturalise the creek from The Crescent to the mouth at Rozelle Bay.

== Marine life ==
In September 2009 a bull shark believed to be 1.8 metres (5 ft 11 in) long was sighted in Johnstons Creek. The shark was last seen swimming along the Glebe foreshore in the direction of the Anzac Bridge.

== Johnstons Creek Route ==
The Johnstons Creek route is an unbuilt arterial route proposal from mascot and Annandale, which follows Johnstons Creek along part of the alignment. There is "precious little literature" on the route proposals. The WestConnex plans for the widened Campbell Street bridge over the canal to Alexandria used part of the Johnstons Creek Route corridor.

The DMR (the predecessor to the Roads & Traffic Authority) had been purchasing properties along the corridor, where a reservation had existed since 1945. In the 1970's, the Department of Main Roads had started knocking down buildings with the intention to widen Erskineville Road. Green Bans Park was eventually built on the site on one empty lot.

In 1976, the Federal Government commissioned alternative plans to the Department of Main Roads' proposed North Western Expressway to reduce cost and the number of housing demolitions required. It included an alternative freeway proposal or an arterial improvement alternative. The scheme to improve arterial roads included "The Crescent, Annandale, would be upgraded to a 6-lane road to take traffic to the south-east".

In August 1977, an Urban Transport Study Group (URTAC) report made recommendations on release and retention for all DMR road corridors, subject to some conditions, except the Johnsons Creek Route - which was understood to be under consideration by the government.

In 1981, Mr Whelan announced four proposals for a second harbour crossing. An "arterial route from Darling Harbour to Rozelle with a new bridge at Glebe Island" and the "Johnstons Creek County Road" were described as associated roadworks. The Darling Harbour to Rozelle crossing was known as the Glebe Island Arterial and later named Anzac Bridge.

The 1982 Plan for Sydney Park included Department of Main Roads (DMR) plans for nearby roads. The report stated that while proposed had been formulated to upgrade Campbell road "possibly" to freeway standards as part of a 'County Road' route, "barring acts of politiciansthe proposals were however, unlikely to be built in the foreseeable future. The authors asked how the upgraded Campbell Road route would be linked with the Princes Highway, and a DMR officer mentioned a possibility of using Barwon Park Road, though they "stressed" that the DMR had has no major plans for Campbell Road "within normal planning horizons."

In 1987, Laurie Brereton announced the Department of Main Roads abandoned a number of proposed freeways, link roads and road widenings. This included the abandoning of the "Johnstons Creek route" planning scheme reservation between The Crescent, Rozelle and Parramatta Road, Annandale.

In 2004 and 2005 residents and groups including EcoTransit stopped an extension to the F6 (which they named the "Johnston's Creek Extension") which would have run from Anzac Bridge, through Newtown to Randwick. Michelle Zeibots launched a campaign and distributed 100,000 newsletters, though route plans were not public. Mary Jane Gleeson located one email exchange between members of the Roads & Traffic Authority referring to construction.

As of 2005, constructed segments included part of Bourke Road (Mascot), between O’Riordan Street and Coward Street (1988) and between Coward Street and Gardeners Road (1999).

Subsequently, most of the Johnstons Creek Route corridor was removed in March 2006, but not all of it.

The Inner West Bypass (or Inner-West Motorway) proposal roughly followed the route of the "Johnston's Creek Extension Road".

== See also ==
- Whites Creek
- Glebe and Wentworth Park railway viaducts
