= Robert Hickson =

Australian cricketer and architect

Robert Newburgh Hickson
Personal information
- Born: 2 May 1884; Newcastle, New South Wales, Australia
- Died: 21 June 1963 (aged 79); Armidale, New South Wales, Australia
- Source: ESPNcricinfo, 31 December 2016

Robert Newburgh Hickson (2 May 1884 – 21 June 1963) was an Australian architect and cricketer. He played fourteen first-class matches for New South Wales between 1902/03 and 1907/08. He was regional architect for the Rural Bank of New South Wales and for the Anglican Diocese of Armidale.

== See also ==
- List of New South Wales representative cricketers
