= Whites Creek (Annandale) =

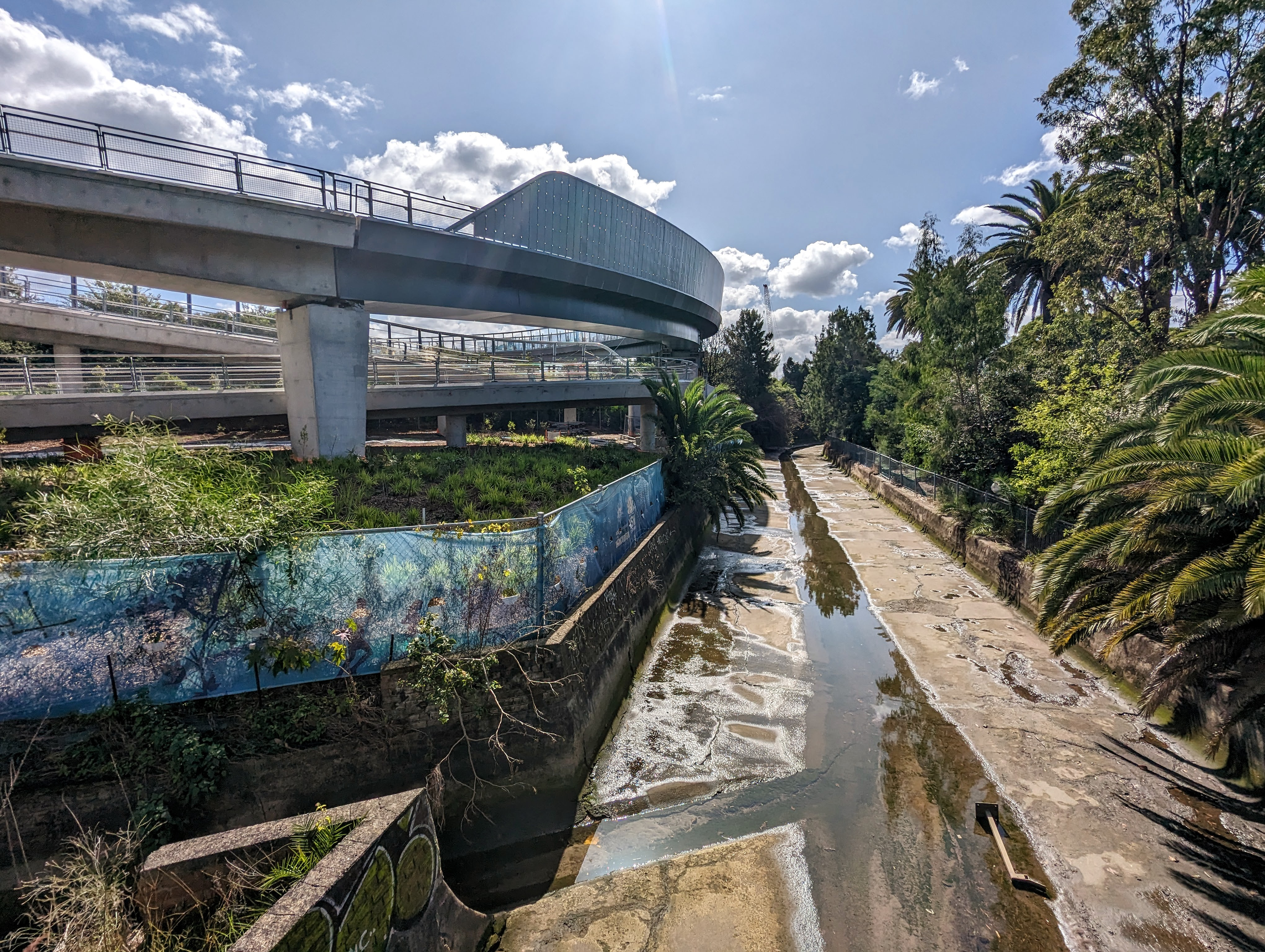
- Whites Creek near the corner of Brenan Street, Lilyfield, and Railway Parade, Annandale
- Etymology: John White

Location
- Country: Australia
- State: New South Wales
- Region: Inner West
- Local government area: Inner West Council

Physical characteristics
- Source: Hamond Hill Farm
  - location: Annandale
- Mouth: Rozelle Bay
  - coordinates: 33°52′26.3″S 151°10′10.0″E

Basin features
- River system: Port Jackson
- Designation: New South Wales State Heritage Register

Whites Creek, formerly known as White's Creek, was once a natural waterway that was concreted to improve sanitation. The creek is now a heritage–listed artificial waterway located in the inner–west region of Sydney, New South Wales, Australia.

== Course and features ==
Sanitation was poor in the first 100 years of the new colony, and the waterways were contaminated. The waterway was concreted and became a Whites Creek Channel between 1898 and 1935, to cope with the runoff from the increasing amount of impermeable surfaces that. The Whites Creek storm drain as it is now, is located in flows in a northerly direction into Rozelle Bay, part of the Sydney Harbour.

In 1898, an aqueduct was built to carry the sewerage over Whites Creek. This was the first use of the Monier system of reinforced concrete in Australia.

Wetlands were constructed adjacent to the Whites Creek Channel in 2002, to filter out excess nutrients and improve the quality of water flowing into the harbour.

In 2023, a major roads and tunnels project, the M4–M5 Link Rozelle Interchange, including a park (the Rozelle Parklands) and a shared user path bridge over City West Link adjacent to the creek, is under construction in Lilyfield.

== Etymology ==
Whites Creek is named in honour of John White, the surgeon to the First Fleet. White received a land grant, which he named Hamond Hill Farm, to the south of Parramatta Road, where Whites Creek has its source.

== Gallery ==
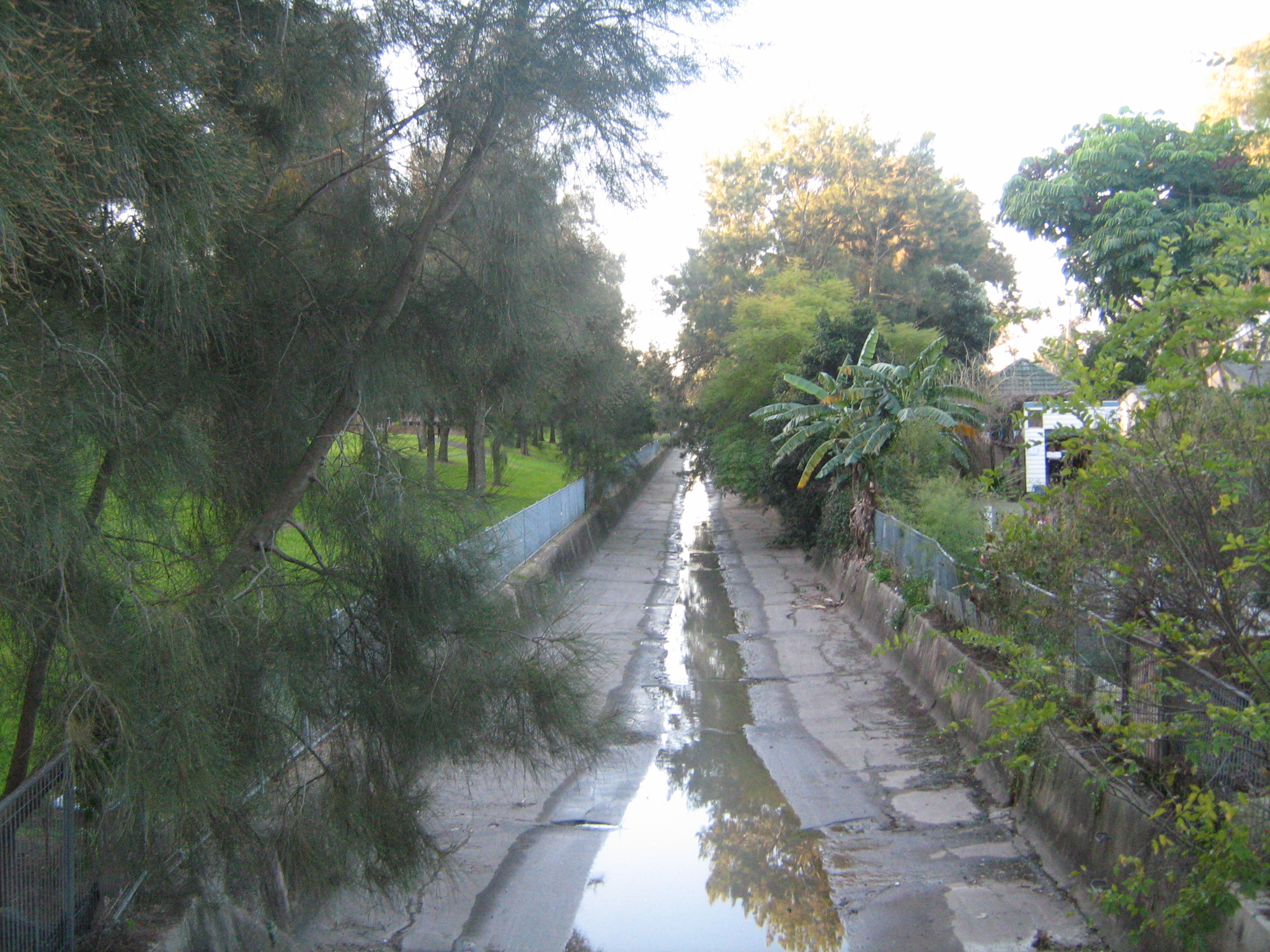
Whites Creek at Piper Street, Annandale, 2009

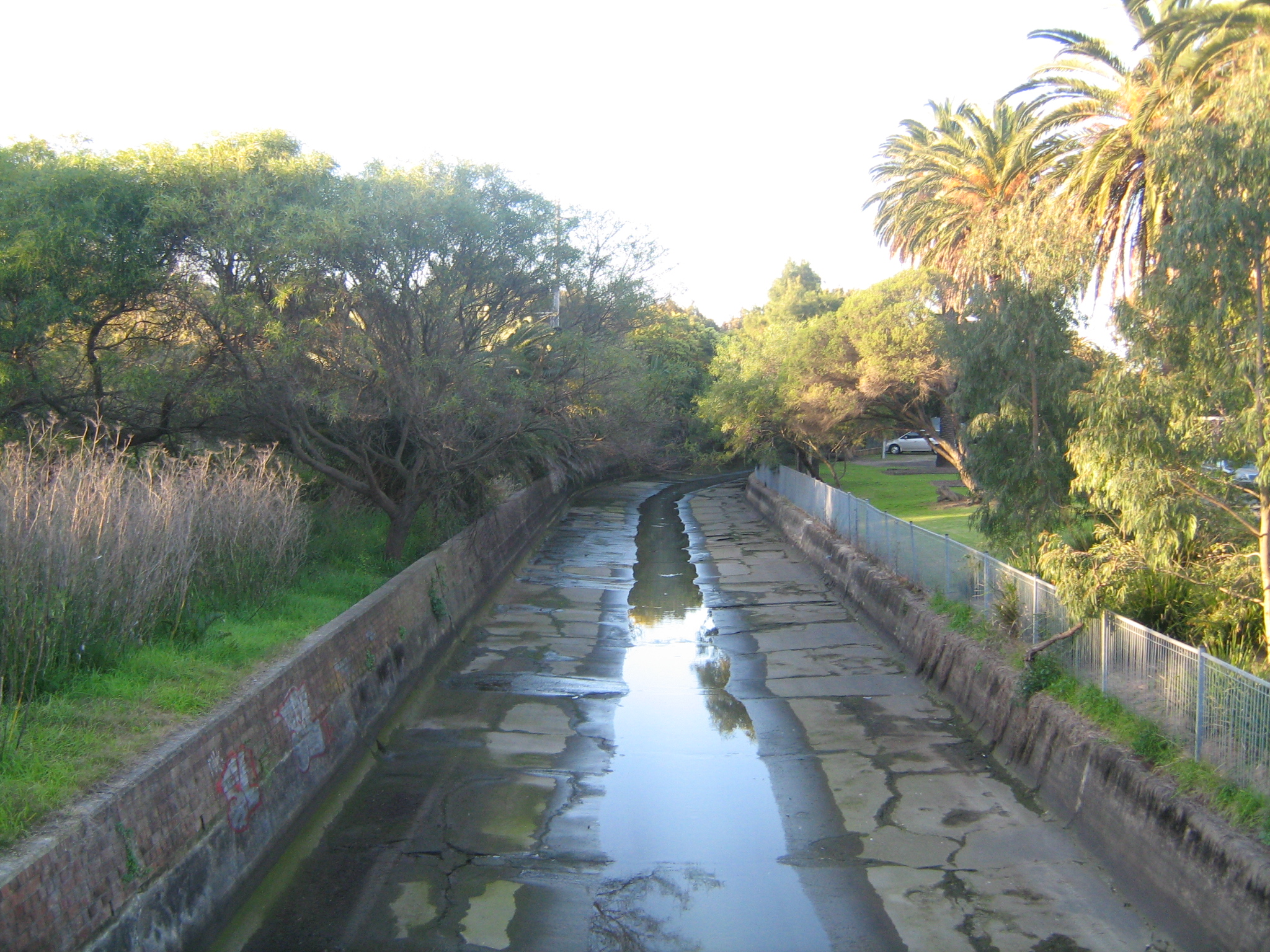
At Brenan Street and Railway Parade, 2009

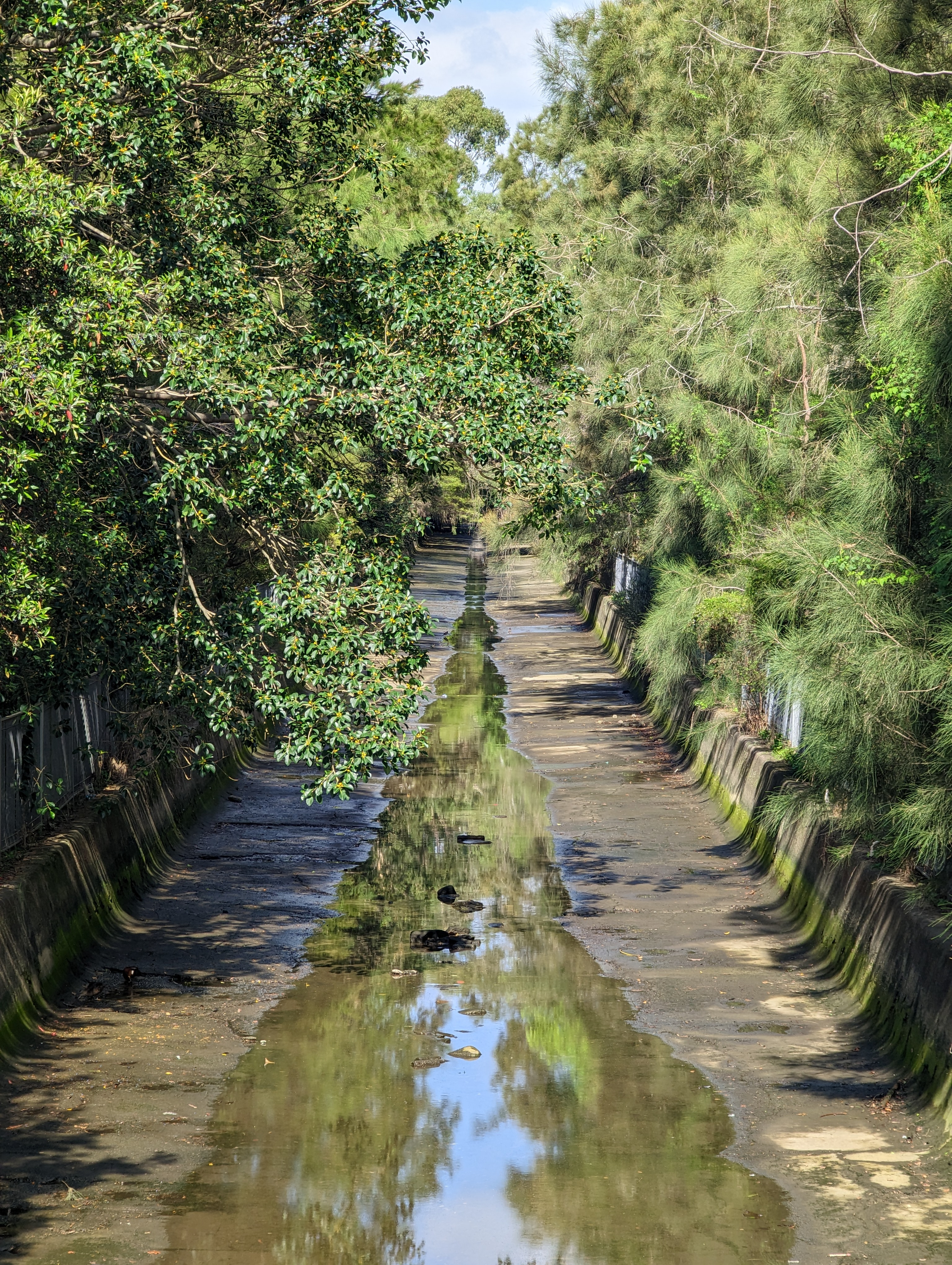
Looking upstream from Brenan Street, Lilyfield, 2023

== See also ==
- Sydney Metropolitan catchment
