= Lindsay Gordon Scott =

Australian architect

- Born: 4 October 1898; Grafton, Colony of New South Wales
- Died: 4 January 1941 (aged 42); Fairlight, New South Wales, Australia
- Education: Sydney Technical College (ASTC)
- Occupation: Architect
- Spouse(s): Audrey Roberta Scott (née Hamburger; m. 1930)
- Children: John Scott
- Practice: Robertson & Marks (1923–1924); Ross & Rowe (1925–1933)
- Buildings: Erskineville Town Hall (1938)

Lindsay Gordon Scott ARAIA (4 October 1898 – 4 January 1941) was an Australian architect best associated for his design of the Erskineville Town Hall and numerous surf pavilions in New South Wales, including several on the Northern Beaches of Sydney.

== Early life and family ==
Scott was born to John Campbell Scott, a blacksmith, and Isabel Mary Scott (née Dodd) in 1898 in the town of Grafton, in the Northern Rivers region of New South Wales, and moved with his family to Sydney in 1901 at a young age. Scott received his architectural training at the Sydney Technical College.

In 1930 in Ashfield, Scott married Audrey Roberta Hamburger (1902–1970). On 4 July 1931, at Burilda Private Hospital on Gower Street, Summer Hill, they had a son John who was stillborn.

== Architectural practice ==
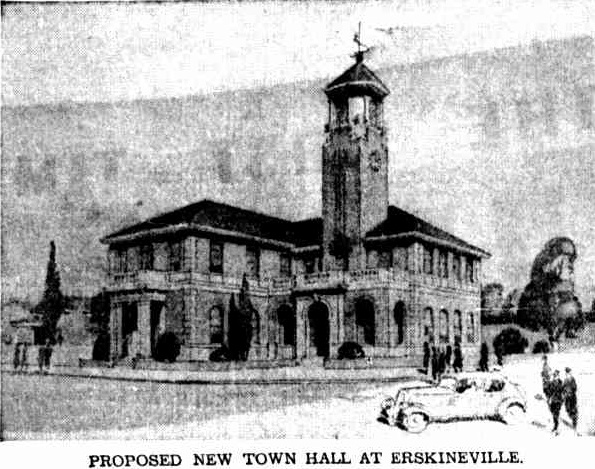
Scott's original design for the Erskineville Town Hall, as it appeared in the Sydney Morning Herald on 1 December 1936.

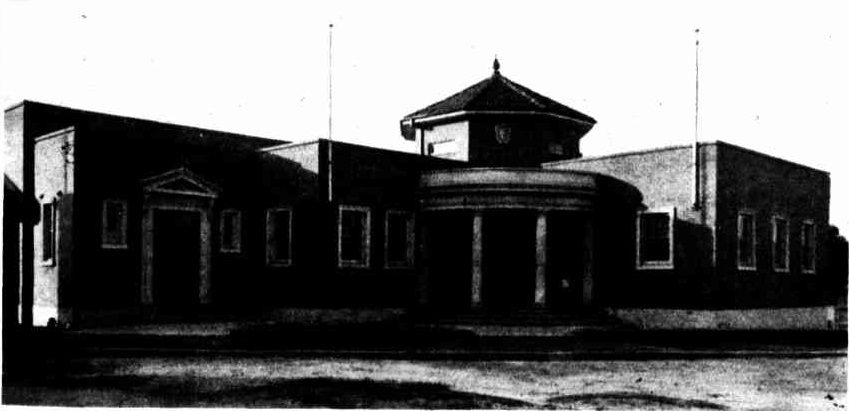
The Erskineville Town Hall on its completion in August 1938.

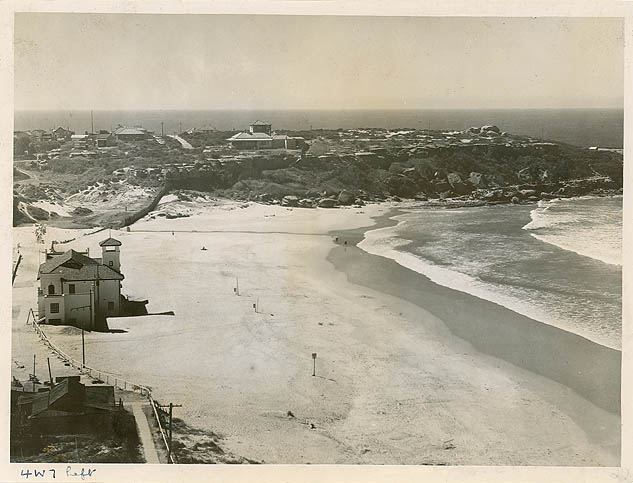
Freshwater Beach photographed in circa 1935, with Scott's clubhouse at left.

In 1923, Scott joined the prominent Sydney architectural firm of Robertson and Marks as an assistant, and from 1925 was working within another prominent firm, Ross and Rowe. In 1925 he was admitted as a member of the New South Wales Institute of Architects. While at Ross and Rowe, in 1926–1930 Scott was involved in the redesign project for the Mark Foy's Piazza Department Store.

On 28 December 1933, Scott left Ross & Rowe and took up a temporary position as an assistant architect in the Ways and Works Branch of the NSW Department of Railways, leaving this position on 22 October 1935. In 1934, Scott established his own private practice, operating at 350 George Street (to 1936) and 26 O'Connell Street (from 1936) in Sydney. In private practice Scott continue to design all manner of works including residential dwellings and commercial and industrial premises. His design for an Inter-war Old English style residence overlooking Collaroy Beach featured in prominent architectural magazine, Building, in 1937.

A resident of the Northern Beaches of Sydney for many years, Scott was intimately involved in Surf Life Saving, being captain of the Freshwater Surf Life Saving Club in 1924–26, as well as an executive, vice-president, and later Honorary Architect of the Surf Life Saving Association. As Honorary Architect, Scott designed several Surf Life Saving clubs and surf pavilions, including at Freshwater Beach (1935), Coffs Harbour Jetty (1935), South Curl Curl (1937), Palm Beach (1937), and Queenscliff (1938).

In late 1936 Scott was commissioned by the Municipality of Erskineville to design a new Town Hall for the small inner city council. Scott's initial design in the Mediterranean style was an ambitious one, including two stories and a 75-foot-high clock tower, echoing his design of the Freshwater Surf Life Saving Club the year before. This design however was found to be too expensive and grand for a small municipality in a primarily working-class area of Sydney and was later revised to be a scaled down single-storey building without the tower in a similar red brick Mediterranean style. Completed in 1938, the Town Hall was also featured in Building. In 1939 Scott designed the Christ Church in Coonabarabran for the Anglican Diocese of Bathurst.

Apart from surf life saving, Scott was active elsewhere in the community as a member of the Cromer Country Golf Club, president of the Manly Chamber of Commerce, member of the Manly Rotary Club, and at one time Master of the Masonic Lodge, Annandale.

On 4 January 1941 at the age of 42, Scott died of a brain haemorrhage at his residence at 26 Fairlight Street, Fairlight. Survived by his wife Audrey, Scott's funeral was held at St Andrew's Presbyterian Church, Manly, before his body was cremated at Northern Suburbs Crematorium. In a final tribute to his long contribution to the surf life saving community, a team comprising the Freshwater, Queenscliff, and South Curl Curl surf life saving crews scattered his ashes off Freshwater beach on 8 June 1941.

== List of works (incomplete) ==
- Masonic Lodge, 19 Marlborough Street, Leichhardt (1925).
- Residence, Mosman (1927).
- Harbord Literary Institute (Front extension), 31 Lawrence Street, Freshwater (1935).
- Residence, Collaroy (1935).
- Freshwater Surf Life Saving Club (1935).
- Bakery, shop and dwelling, Albert Street, Freshwater (1936).
- South Curl Curl Surf Club (1936).
- Residence, Rickard Avenue, Mosman (1936).
- Dwelling, Haig Street, Maroubra (1936).
- Palm Beach Surf Pavilion (now renamed Lieutenant Colonel Douglas Marks DSO, MC Pavilion), 1 Ocean Road, Palm Beach (1937).
- Factory premises, Parramatta Road, Auburn (1937).
- Residence, Strathfield (1937).
- Erskineville Town Hall, 104 Erskineville Road, Erskineville (1938).
- Queenscliff Surf Pavilion, Manly (1938).
- Christ Church, 94 Dalgarno Street, Coonabarabran (1939).
- Manly Bowling Club pavilion, Ivanhoe Park (1940).
