= Municipality of Erskineville =

Former local government area in New South Wales, Australia

Municipality of Erskineville New South Wales
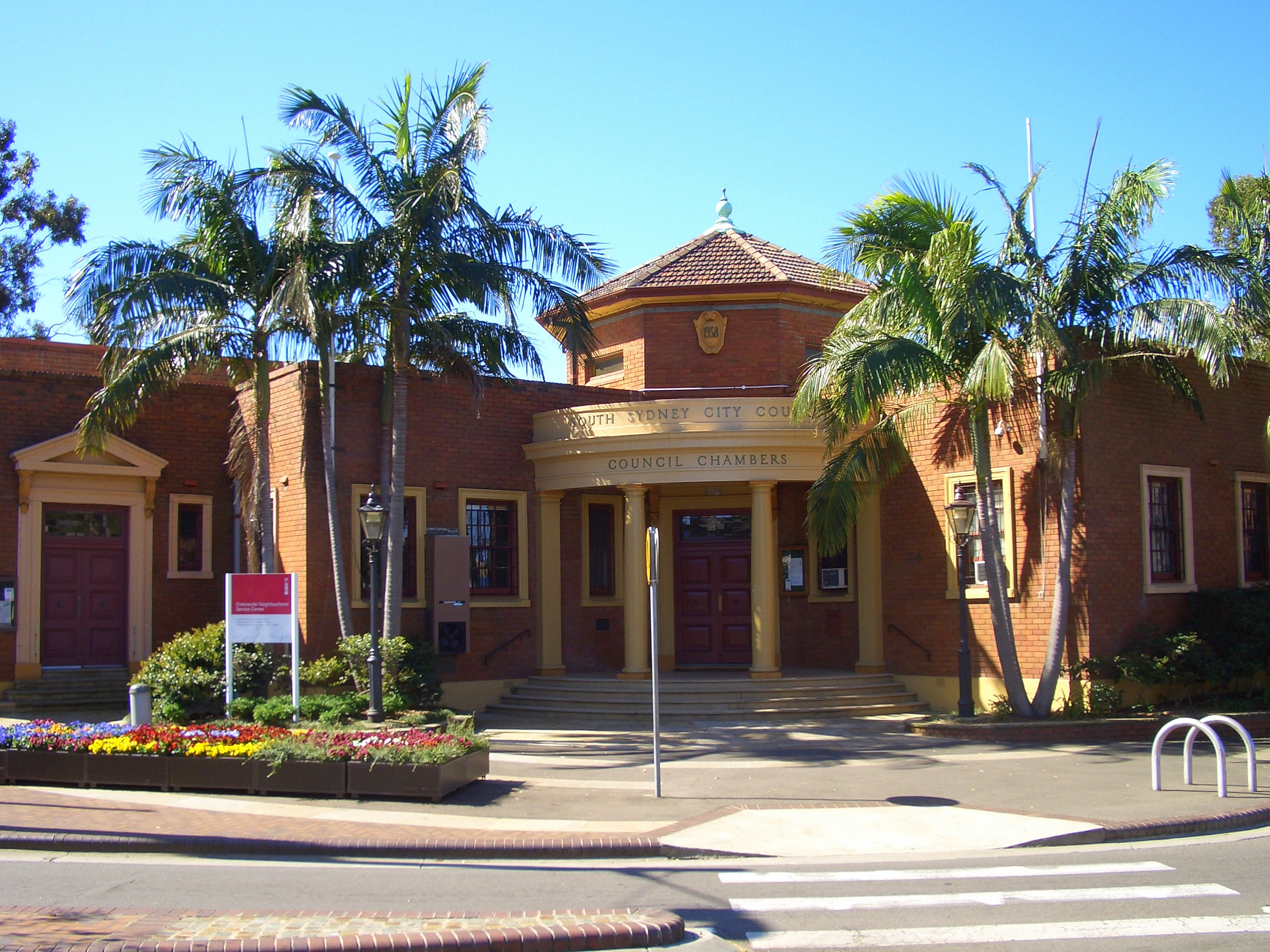
- Erskineville Town Hall in 2006.
- Population: 6,881 (1947 census)
  - Density: 1,966/km^{2} (5,090/sq mi)
- Established: 23 May 1872
- Abolished: 31 December 1948
- Area: 3.5 km^{2} (1.4 sq mi)
- Council seat: Erskineville Town Hall
- Region: Inner West
- County: Cumberland
- Parish: Petersham
LGAs around Municipality of Erskineville:
	Newtown	Redfern
Newtown	Municipality of Erskineville	Alexandria
St Peters	Alexandria

The Municipality of Erskineville was a local government area of Sydney, New South Wales, Australia. The municipality was proclaimed as the "Municipal District of Macdonald Town" on 23 May 1872 and, with an area of 0.8 square kilometres, was one of the smallest local government areas in Sydney and included the modern suburb of Erskineville, part of Eveleigh and the locality of Macdonaldtown. The council was amalgamated, along with most of its neighbours, with the City of Sydney to the north with the passing of the Local Government (Areas) Act 1948. From 1968 to 1982 and from 1989 to 2004, the area was part of the South Sydney councils, with the former Town Hall serving as its council chambers.

== Council history and location ==
The municipality was proclaimed by the Administrator of the Government of New South Wales, Sir Alfred Stephen, on 23 May 1872, with the name of the Municipal District of Macdonald Town (but was variously known as the "Borough of Macdonald Town" or the "Municipality of Macdonaldtown"). On 19 July 1872, the first council, consisting of six aldermen in one electorate, was elected (Charles Brandling Henderson, Henry Knight, James Bryan, Alexander Swanson, William Irwin and James Heighington), with Henry Knight elected as the first mayor at the first meeting on 23 July 1872. Knight (1801–1887) was a prominent landowner, builder and brick-maker who had also served as an alderman for Kingston Ward on the first council of the Municipality of Newtown when it was created in February 1863, serving until 1866.

The council first met in a weatherboard cottage on Erskineville Road, which was replaced by a purpose-built Victorian style design Town Hall designed by architects, Drake and Walcott, who had also designed the Leichhardt Town Hall and were commissioned by the council in March 1889. Built by Thomas Johnson, of Ultimo, the hall was completed in 1890 and the council first met there in February 1890.

On 19 May 1884, a further proclamation divided the municipality into three wards: North Ward, Middle Ward and South Ward. On 27 March 1893 the Parliament of New South Wales passed the "Borough of Erskineville Naming Act, 1893", effecting the name change from Macdonaldtown to the "Borough of Erskineville". From 28 December 1906, following the passing of the Local Government Act, 1906, the council was again renamed as the "Municipality of Erskineville". With the area being a significant working-class and industrial area, from the late 1910s and 1920s the council was completely controlled by the Australian Labor Party. Non-Labour aldermen were not elected until the 1940s, when Lang Labor eventually took control of the council.

=== Later history ===
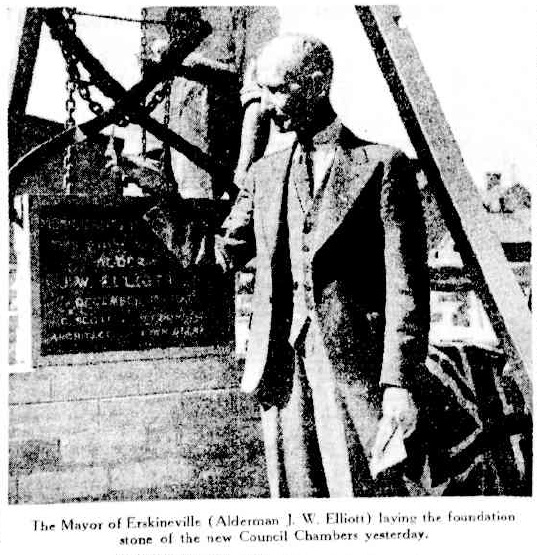
Mayor Elliott laying the foundation for the new Town Hall, 1 December 1937, as published in the Sydney Morning Herald.

By the 1930s, with the announcement of the widening and realignment of Erskineville Road, the Victorian-era town hall was set to be demolished. As a consequence, Erskineville Council commissioned plans for a new town hall on a site adjacent to the old hall. In 1936, an initial design by Sydney Architect Lindsay Gordon Scott was accepted. This design was an ambitious one, including two stories and a 75-foot-high clock tower. This design however was found to be too expensive and grand for a small municipality in a primarily working-class area of Sydney and was revised to be the current design of a single storey building without the tower in a similar red brick Georgian revival style. On 1 December 1937, the Mayor of the council, Alderman J. W. Elliott, laid the foundation stone and nearly year later, on 26 November 1938, the Secretary for Public Works and Minister for Local Government, Eric Spooner MLA, officially opened Erskineville Town Hall with the Mayor at that time, Alderman Nicholas McGuinness.

By the end of the Second World War, the NSW Government had realised that its ideas of infrastructure expansion could not be effected by the present system of the mostly-poor inner-city municipal councils and the Minister for Local Government, Joseph Cahill, passed a bill in 1948 that abolished a significant number of those councils. Under the Local Government (Areas) Act 1948, Erskineville Municipal Council was merged with the larger neighbouring City of Sydney.

== Mayors ==
Years	Mayors	Notes
23 July 1872 – 13 February 1873	Henry Knight	
13 February 1873 – 13 February 1874	Alexander Swanson	
13 February 1874 – 13 February 1878	Charles Brandling Henderson	
13 February 1878 – 7 February 1880	Thomas Braid	
7 February 1880 – 15 February 1882	Joseph Horsfall	
15 February 1882 – 14 February 1883	James Bryan	
14 February 1883 – 15 February 1884	Joseph Horsfall	
15 February 1884 – 14 February 1885	John Frederick Fallick	
14 February 1885 – 9 February 1887	John Goddard	
9 February 1887 – 14 February 1888	George Ives	
14 February 1888 – 8 February 1889	John Baldwin	
8 February 1889 – 12 February 1890	Andrew Murray	
12 February 1890 – 13 February 1891	George Ives	
13 February 1891 – 10 February 1892	Jacob Jacobsen	
10 February 1892 – 15 February 1893	Thomas Carter	
15 February 1893 – 9 February 1894	James Peake	
9 February 1894 – 13 February 1895	Robert Anderson	
13 February 1895 – 12 February 1896	Jacob Jacobsen	
12 February 1896 – 10 February 1897	James Peake	
10 February 1897 – 10 February 1898	Robert Anderson	
10 February 1898 – 8 February 1899	George Crooks Watson	
8 February 1899 – 8 February 1902	Gaius Clarke	
8 February 1902 – February 1908	William Robinson	
February 1908 – February 1911	William Henry Jackson	
February 1911 – 20 March 1911	William Robinson	
March 1911 – February 1914	Leopold Frederick Theodore Schuler	
February 1914 – February 1917	William Robinson	
February 1917 – February 1918	J. Vincent (ALP)	
February 1918 – February 1919	Thomas English (ALP)	
February 1919 – February 1920	George Ouvrier (ALP)	
February 1920 – December 1920	Albert Patrick Henry (ALP)	
December 1920 – December 1921	James Higgins (ALP)	
December 1921 – December 1922	Thomas English (ALP)	
December 1922 – December 1923	Alfred Stevens White (ALP)	
December 1923 – December 1924	Albert Patrick Henry (ALP)	
December 1924 – 21 December 1925	George Ouvrier (ALP)	
21 December 1925 – December 1926	John Patrick McCarthy (ALP)	
December 1926 – 19 December 1927	Thomas English (ALP)	
19 December 1927 – 17 December 1928	Albert Patrick Henry (ALP)	
17 December 1928 – December 1929	Thomas English (ALP)	
December 1929 – December 1930	Albert Patrick Henry (ALP)	
December 1930 – December 1931	Thomas English (ALP)	
December 1931 – December 1932	Albert Patrick Henry (ALP)	
December 1932 – December 1933	John William Elliott (ALP)	
December 1933 – December 1934	Thomas English (ALP)	
December 1934 – December 1935	Albert Patrick Henry (ALP)	
December 1935 – December 1936	John Patrick McCarthy (ALP)	
December 1936 – December 1937	John William Elliott (ALP)	
December 1937 – December 1938	Nicholas McGuinness (ALP)	
December 1938 – December 1940	J. J. Rose (ALP)	
December 1940 – December 1941	A. J. Miller (ALP)	
December 1941 – December 1942	John William Elliott (ALP)	
December 1942 – December 1943	Harry Wright (ALP)	
December 1943 – December 1945	John Patrick McCarthy (Ind/Lang)	
December 1945 – December 1946	M. C. Jordan (Lang)	
December 1946 – December 1947	Francisco Pietro Fitzjohn (Lang)	
December 1947 – 31 December 1948	W. J. Anderson (Lang)	

== Town Clerks ==
Years	Town Clerk	Notes
12 September 1872 – 4 September 1881	George Kemmis Tarrant	
September 1881 – 6 December 1882	Robert Caunter	
6 December 1882 – 16 April 1883	Beilby Portus Pell Kemp	
16 April 1883 – 14 October 1886	William James Osborne Harman	
14 October 1886 – 20 December 1886	Albert Thomas Fitt	
20 December 1886 – 1 August 1901	William Falkland Bray	
6 August 1901 – 18 November 1910	Arthur Francis Desborough	
21 November 1910 – March 1918	John Crosdell Lough	
17 March 1918 – 24 May 1935	Harold Knight Mackney	
22 October 1935 – 1 August 1939	William Irvine Donald	
August 1939 – July 1946	Frank O'Grady	
July 1946 – 31 December 1948	E. R. Henry	
