= Freshwater Surf Life Saving Club =

Australian club (e. 1908)

Freshwater Surf Life Saving Club, established in 1908, is located at Freshwater Beach in Australia. It has become a large volunteer organization with strong community bonds. The club was founded by a push from government to foster safer beach practices. It is a part of Surf Life Saving Australia, a not-for-profit organization committed to keeping the beach safe for patrons and providing beach rescue services. A visit to the club from United States' surfer, Duke Kahanamoku, in 1914 helped initiate the sport of surfing in Australia.

== History ==
=== Establishment ===
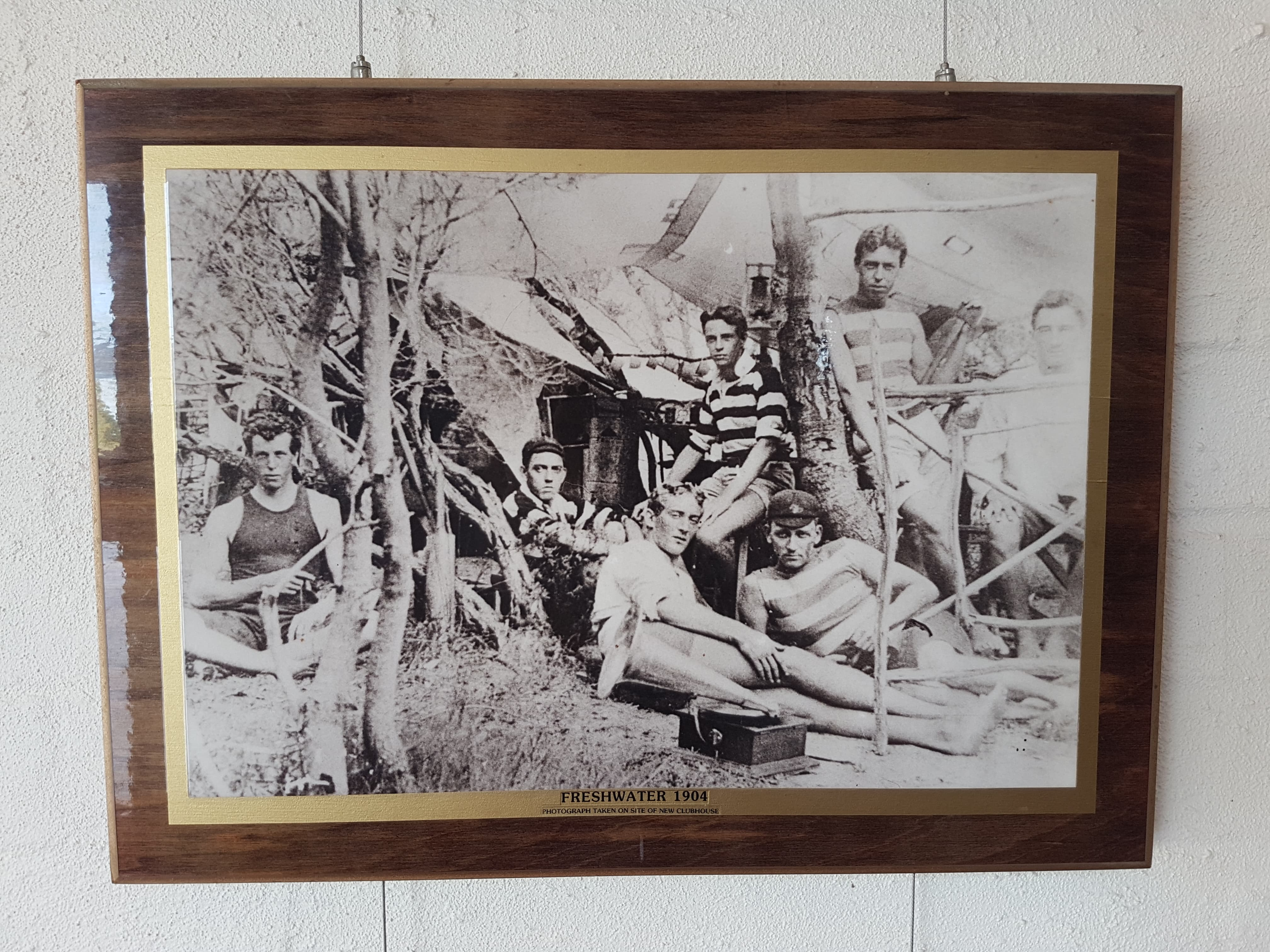
The first clubhouse

In the early 20th century, the Australian government began discussing the issue of water and beach safety for citizens. Bondi was the first beach to begin training people to save a drowning person and escort the victim to shore safely. Manly Beach soon followed Bondi's lead and, in 1908, hired the first paid lifeguard in Australia. The Freshwater Surf Life Saving Club then established a crew of lifeguards—its members made up of local people who camped along the beach. Fred Fritz was one camper and lifeguard and became the first recognized Club Captain in 1908. The Freshwater SLSC was one of the first to be recognized by the Surf Bathing Association—a committee in charge of verifying beach accommodations for dressing, life-saving and safety equipment.

The club and land ownership moved from private to a council lease and officially opened its first clubhouse in 1910. The focus was on beach safety and the improvement of club facilities—attempts to employ paid permanent lifesavers did not occur until many years later. The first official competition between surf clubs was held in 1911.

=== The naming of the club ===
In 1923 it was proposed that the name of the association be changed to Harbord. This was enacted by a council decision. Although this motion passed, the local members of the SLSC were fond of the name "Freshwater", and so "Freshwater SLSC" persisted. This caused problems over the coming years in the relationship between council and the SLSC, which resulted in a lack of funding from the council. The SLSC held many fundraisers to raise funds for the club and were put under heavy supervision from the council.

Competition grew from the conception of the club. From 1920, surf carnivals became a common practice. Freshwater Surf Life Saving Club member, Rainsford Matheson, won the first ever surfboat race. During this time Freshwater considering itself as one of the "strongest surf clubs in existence". Through the next century Freshwater Surf Club has gone on to win a range of titles, developed many Olympic representatives as part of the club, and participated in many overseas competitions and tours.

== The Surf Club ==
After its initial construction in 1910 the club was renovated numerous times, including the addition of an extension, electricity and a phone line. However, it was proposed in 1930 that a new clubhouse was needed as the original was outdated. The process of planning and building a new clubhouse occurred over the next five years. Designed by the long-serving member, former president of the club, and architect, Lindsay Gordon Scott, in the Inter-war Mediterranean style. The clubhouse was built on the beach which later raised concerns over integrity of the structure due to flooding.

In the 1960s, there needed to be improvements to the clubhouse that required an extension due to the influx of younger members. The club required a bunkroom and ski shed. These plans were approved. In 1974, a storm that hit caused beach erosion along the coast of Australia. The Surf Club was nearly swept away as water splashed up against the club's wall. Dune restorations and tree planting commenced shortly after this event as the importance of the beaches' natural landscape was realised. After 15 years of advocacy, a new clubhouse was built in 1987 and opened in 1988. The former building was heritage listed and restored. Trees were also planted around the area in an attempt to restore the natural environment.

== Nippers ==
Membership and participation in the Freshwater SLSC declined in the 1960s. The commencement of a group targeting membership of boys aged 5–13 in 1965 helped to revive the club. The group was called The Nippers and events were developed over the next decades. The group included 134 boys by the mid-1970s and girls were invited to join in the 1980s. By 2003, the Nippers had over 500 registrants at Freshwater.

== Surfing ==
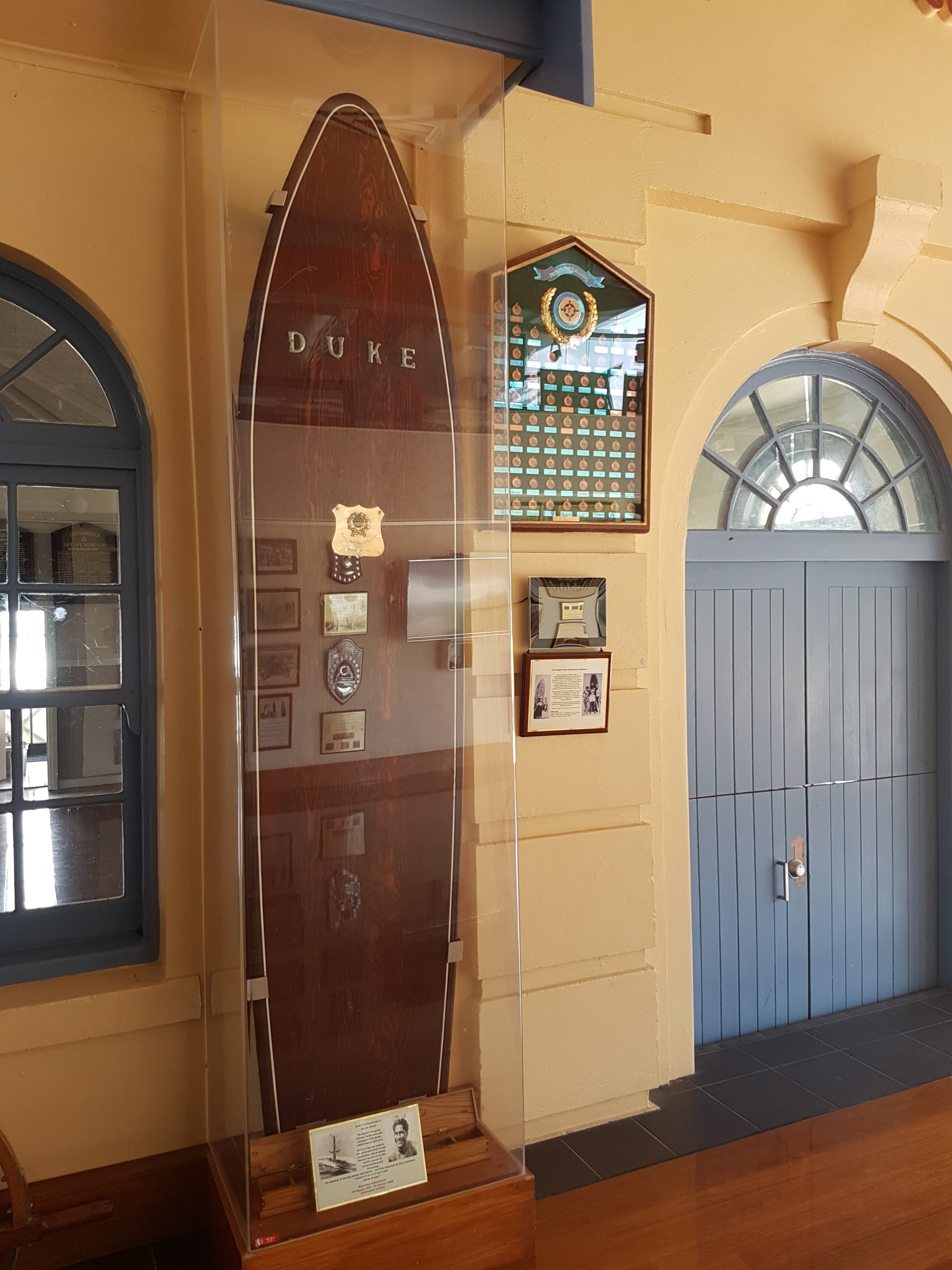
Duke Kahanamoku's Surfboard

A visit from Duke Kahanamoku (US Olympian and surfer) in 1914 helped contribute to the rise in popularity of surfing. Many riders copied his style of wooden board and, in 1952, Duke donated one of his boards to the Freshwater SLSC, where it remains a vital part of Australian surfing history.

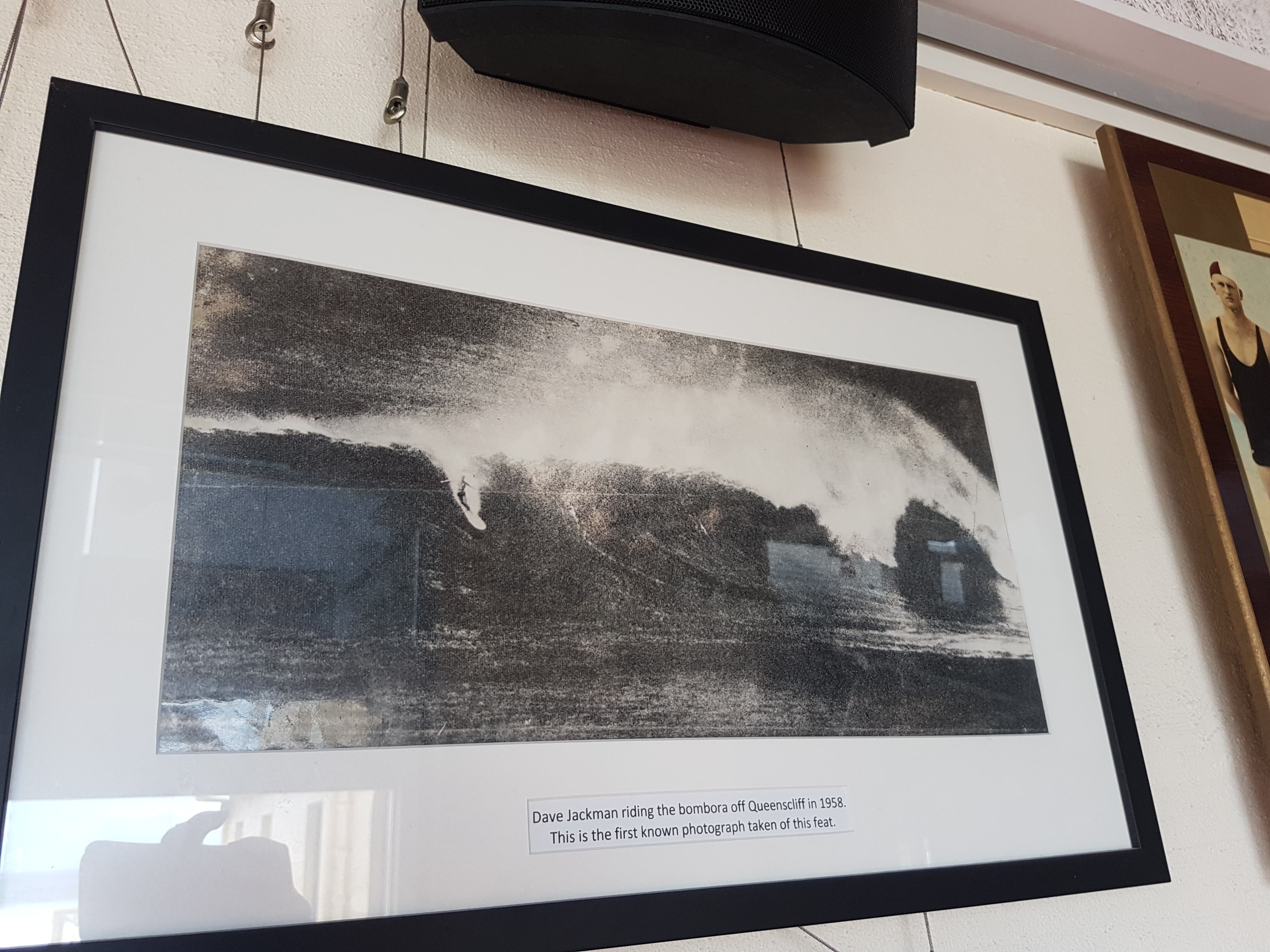
Don Jackman catching a wave over the bombora

Surf craft became established in the 1930s in Freshwater as people such as Don Henderson became proficient in board paddling. He would go on to come third in the national titles. Another member of the club, Don Jackman, was the first person in the world to be photographed catching a wave over a bombora.

== War ==
World War One:

Many members of the Freshwater SLSC volunteered for the war effort. 79 members participated, with 11 losing their lives. This changed the makeup of members and morale of the club, adding a sombre feel to the association.

World War Two:

187 club members participated in World War Two, with 12 losing their lives.

Although many young men were absent from patrol, numbers were consistent and unfailing due to older members acting as reserves and the recruitment of younger boys. The beach became a "battle station" full of "tank traps and barbed wire".

== Women ==
Women were appointed as beach inspectors in 1918 at Freshwater SLSC, unlike other clubs that banned female participation entirely. Along with the introduction of the Nippers in 1965, the feminist movement helped redefine the club in the 1960s. The notion that women were inferior was a popular viewpoint prior to the movement and SLSA president, Adrian Curlewis, was reported as saying that woman's role in surf lifesaving was "making tea and raising funds". In the mid-seventies, women were allowed partial access to club activities and in 1980 were granted full access. Events were established in the Australian championships in the mid-eighties. Prior to that, Joanne Venis was a notable Freshwater member who competed in open and male events and was successful at winning multiple events. The first Freshwater female boat crew was formed in 1999.

== Advancements in the rescue technique ==
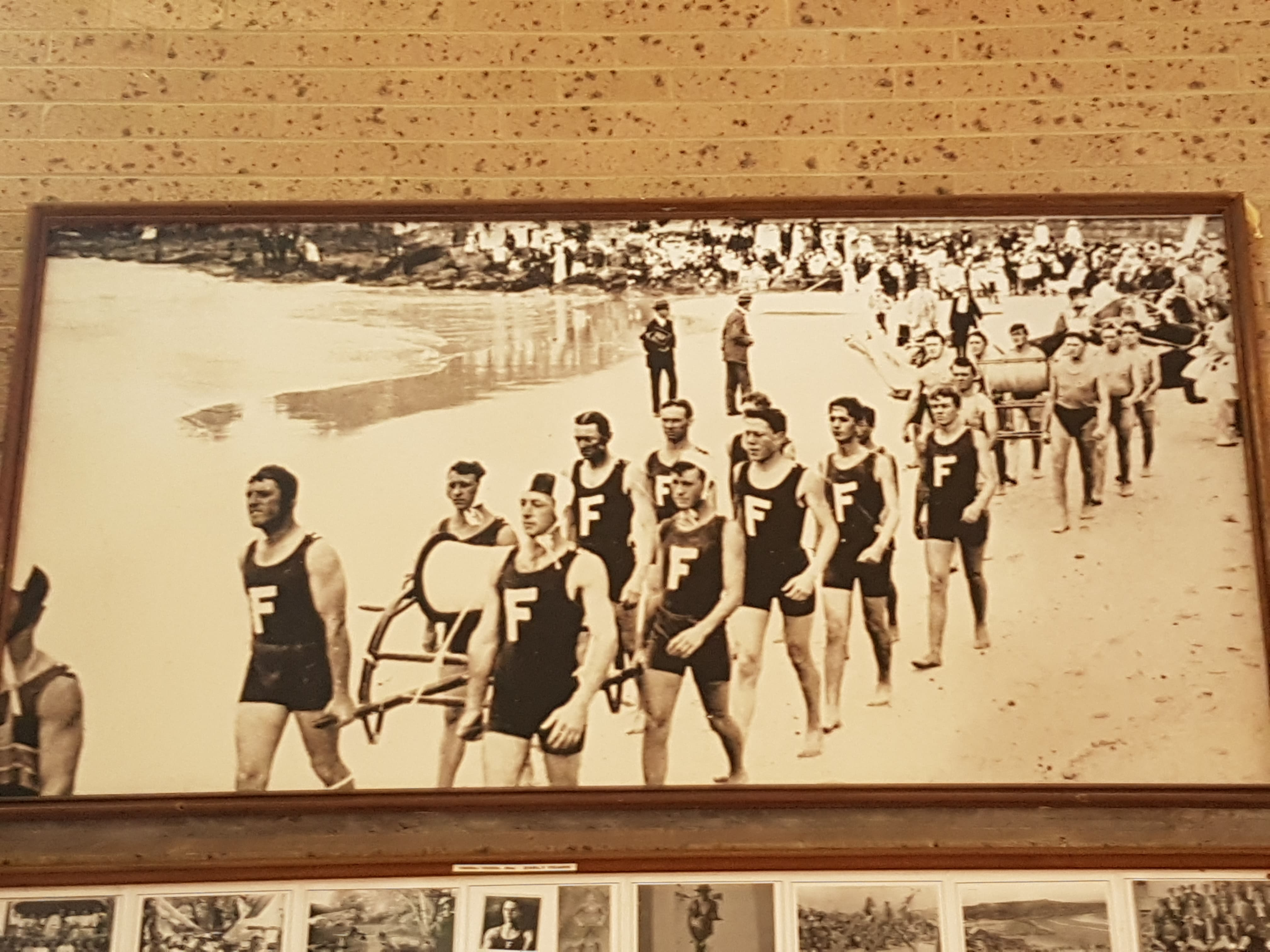
Reel Line Belt procedure at Freshwater Beach

- 1907- Reel Line Belt system was introduced
- 1961- CPR introduced– this technique saved a young boy on Freshwater beach after nearly drowning in the water
- 1967- The "Jack Wilson" jet ski begins to be used by Freshwater and two other beaches; successfully rescuing many people
- 1980s- Professional Lifeguards are introduced at Freshwater
- 1980s- Reel Line Belt method replaced with rescue tubes and surf rescue boards

== Notable moments ==
- 1950- Meryn Fletcher, member of Freshwater SLSC died in a competition at Dee Why Beach after his line was caught seaweed.
- 1958- Freshwater celebrated its 50th anniversary
- 1973- Freshwater won the Australian national championship
- 1974- Freshwater started to participate in overseas events
- 1980s- Darren Bogg - Local Freshwater member wins Australian surf racing titles as cadet, junior and senior. He also was the only Freshwater member to win the open surf race title.
- 2008- Freshwater SLSC celebrates its 100-year anniversary

== Events ==
- Freshwater SLSC holds an annual Australia day carnival, the largest in Australia.
- The Barney Mullins Swim Classic is an annual swim-a-thon
- The Christmas Day swim, a relaxed swim race
- Sunday morning surf races

== Executive Committee ==
Title	Name
President	Shanny Dyer
Executive Officer	Richard Hawtin
Treasurer	Michael Rees-Evans
Club Captain/Director of Lifesaving	David Price
Chief Instructor/Director of Education	Kelly Dobrow
Director Sport	Ian Cradock
Director Building & Facilities	Michael Kirkby
Director Sponsorship & Marketing	Derry Cosgrave
Junior Activities Chairperson	Toni Cadden
Director Member Services	Carla Davies
Youth Development Officer	Josh Orr

== Other ==
Freshwater Surf Life Saving Club has multiple function rooms that can be hired out for special events. Proceeds go to the club.

Freshwater Surf Life Saving Club leases out a section of the club to The Pocket Freshwater. The owners of the business are Martin A and Chris Cooper. They provide catering services as well as being the closet café to Freshwater beach.

== See also ==
- Surf lifesaving
- Surf Life Saving Australia
- List of Australian surf lifesaving clubs
