= Erskineville Town Hall =

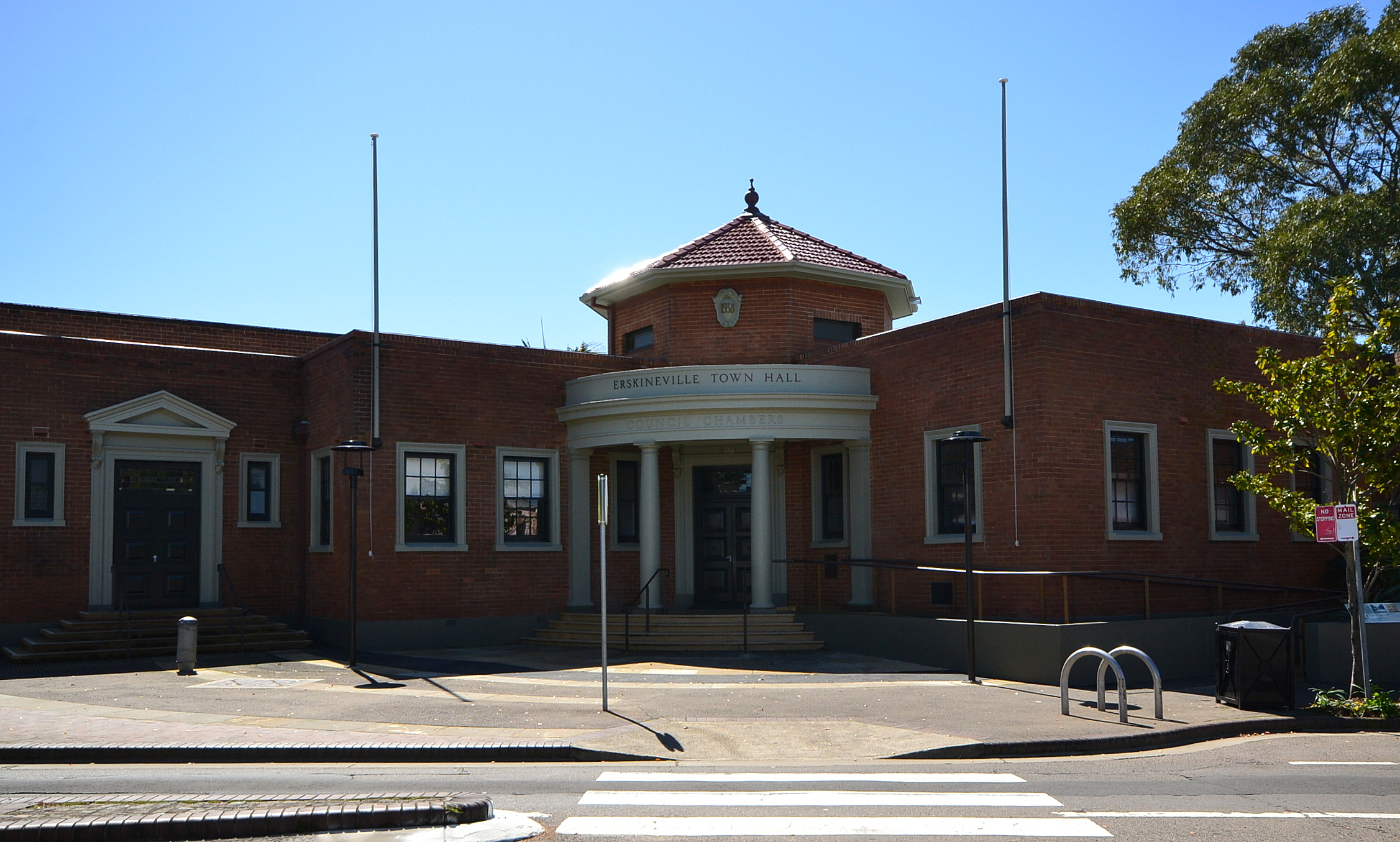
- Erskineville Town Hall in 2014
- Interactive map of the Erskineville Town Hall area
- Former names: South Sydney City Council Chambers

General information
- Type: Government town hall
- Architectural style: Inter-war Mediterranean style.
- Location: 104 Erskineville Road, Erskineville, New South Wales, Australia
- Coordinates: 33°53′58″S 151°11′00″E
- Construction started: 1937
- Completed: 1938
- Client: Erskineville Municipal Council
- Owner: Sydney City Council (current)

Design and construction
- Architect: Lindsay Gordon Scott
- Main contractor: C. Hayter and Son

New South Wales Heritage Database (Local Government Register)
- Official name: Erskineville Town Hall Including Interior and Front Forecourt
- Criteria: a., b., c., d., f., g.
- Designated: 14 December 2012
- Reference no.: I611 (SHI 2420716)
- Listing: Sydney Local Environmental Plan 2012
- Category: Community Facilities > Hall Town Hall

The Erskineville Town Hall is a landmark civic building in Erskineville, a suburb of Sydney. It stands at 104 Erskineville Road. It was opened in 1938 in the Inter-war Mediterranean style by Lindsay Gordon Scott. The Town Hall was the seat of Erskineville Municipal Council from 1938 to 1948 and was the seat of the South Sydney Councils from 1968 to 1982 and 1989 to 2003. Since 2004 the town hall has been a community centre for the City of Sydney servicing the local area and is listed as a heritage item of local significance by the City of Sydney.

== History and description ==
The original Erskineville Town Hall was built on an adjacent site in the 1880s following the incorporation of the Macdonaldtown Municipal Council in 1872. The original town hall replaced a small building which had been used for meetings since incorporation, described in The Sydney Morning Herald as one that could "scarcely be termed a council-chamber, much less a town hall. An insignificant weatherboard structure, about 50ft by 16ft, containing one apartment only, is all the accommodation possessed. In it the council clerk transacts the ordinary business of the borough, and it also does duty as a council-chamber." The purpose-built Victorian style design Town Hall was designed by architects, Drake and Walcott, who had also designed the Leichhardt Town Hall and were commissioned by the council in March 1889. Built by Thomas Johnson, of Ultimo, the hall was completed in 1890 and the council first met there in February 1890. In 1893, Macdonaldtown was subdivided and the suburb of Erskineville was established, with the name changing to be the "Erskineville Municipal Council".

=== Second Town Hall ===
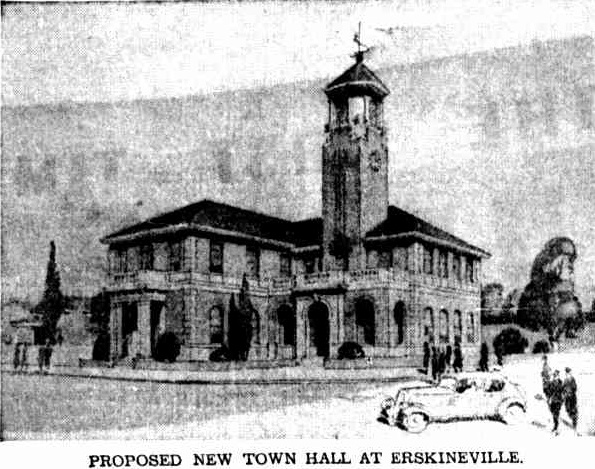
"Proposed New Town Hall at Erskineville", as it appeared in the Sydney Morning Herald on 1 December 1936.

By the 1930s, with the announcement of the widening and realignment of Erskineville Road, the Victorian-era town hall was set to be demolished. As a consequence, Erskineville Council commissioned plans for a new town hall on a site adjacent to the old hall. In 1936, an initial design by Sydney Architect Lindsay Gordon Scott was accepted. This design was an ambitious one, including two stories and a 75-foot-high clock tower. This design however was found to be too expensive and grand for a small municipality in a primarily working-class area of Sydney and was revised to be the current design of a single storey building without the tower in a similar red brick Georgian revival style. In a tribute to the former council chambers, glass from the original town hall was incorporated into the new offices.

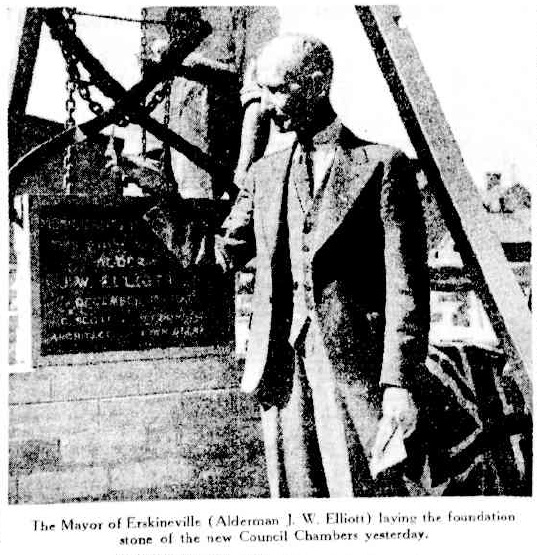
Mayor Elliott laying the foundation for the new Town Hall, 1 December 1937.

On 1 December 1937, the Mayor of the council, Alderman J. W. Elliott, laid the foundation stone and nearly year later, on 26 November 1938, the Secretary for Public Works and Minister for Local Government, Eric Spooner MLA, officially opened Erskineville Town Hall with the Mayor at that time, Alderman N. McGuinness. The Queensland Maple furniture, including the Council Chamber desks, chairs and mayoral chair were all designed by William Hugh Greenwood of Neutral Bay and supplied by J. B. Sharp Pty Ltd of Balmain. Built by C. Hayter and Son, master builders of Hurstville, other contractors and suppliers included Wunderlich Ltd (copper facade and lettering), Melocco Bros. (terrazzo floors), A. H. Dillon Pty Ltd (wall and floor tiles), John Danks & Son (sanitary fittings). However, even this simpler redesign of the town hall found criticism, with the Daily Telegraph demanding to know how the council could justify spending £5000 on their "luxurious chamber" when they wouldn't pay for the immunisation of children against diphtheria for £75.

The new town hall was the home of Erskineville Council until its abolition in 1948 and was a community centre until 1968 when the then "Municipality of Northcott" was established in the area which became the Municipality of South Sydney and then the City of South Sydney. The town hall was its seat until its abolition in 1983 and became the seat of the reestablished South Sydney Council in 1989. It served this role until late in 2003 when the South Sydney City Council resolved to move the Council Chambers to the South Sydney Civic Centre at Lawson Square in Redfern.

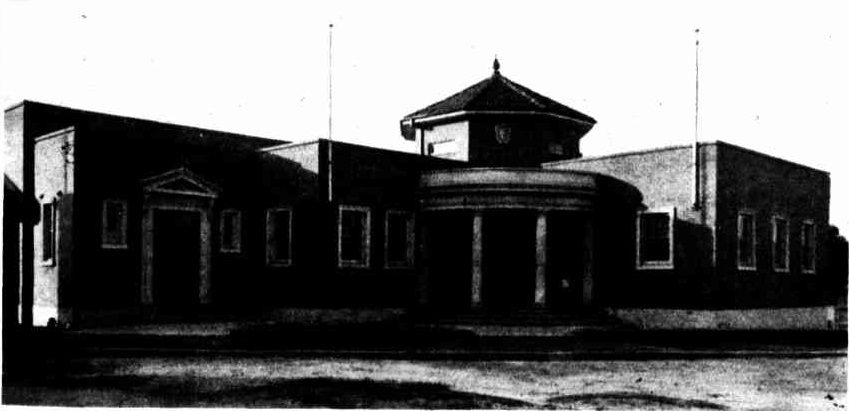
The new Town Hall on its completion in August 1938.

=== Restoration ===
With the merging of the City of South Sydney with the City of Sydney in 2004 however, the town hall became primarily a community centre for the local area. In 2005 Lord Mayor of Sydney Clover Moore commissioned refurbishment and restoration works for the town hall which included gas-powered air-conditioning and solar energy and improved disability access for the building. On completion of this restoration in March 2013, Lord Mayor Moore declared: "Apart from showing you the work we’ve done here, it's also an opportunity to show you how this rejuvenated Town Hall – still going strong in its 75th year – can work for your community. [...] This local landmark can now serve your community into the future." The Town Hall is now also on the City of Sydney heritage register "as a fine example of the growth of small municipal councils in NSW during the 1870s to 1940s and one of three town halls from the same period ─ the others are at Petersham and Rockdale ─ that feature art deco influences, a central clock tower and a classical entry portico."

== See also ==
- List of town halls in Sydney
- Architecture of Sydney
