= Erskineville =

- Suburb
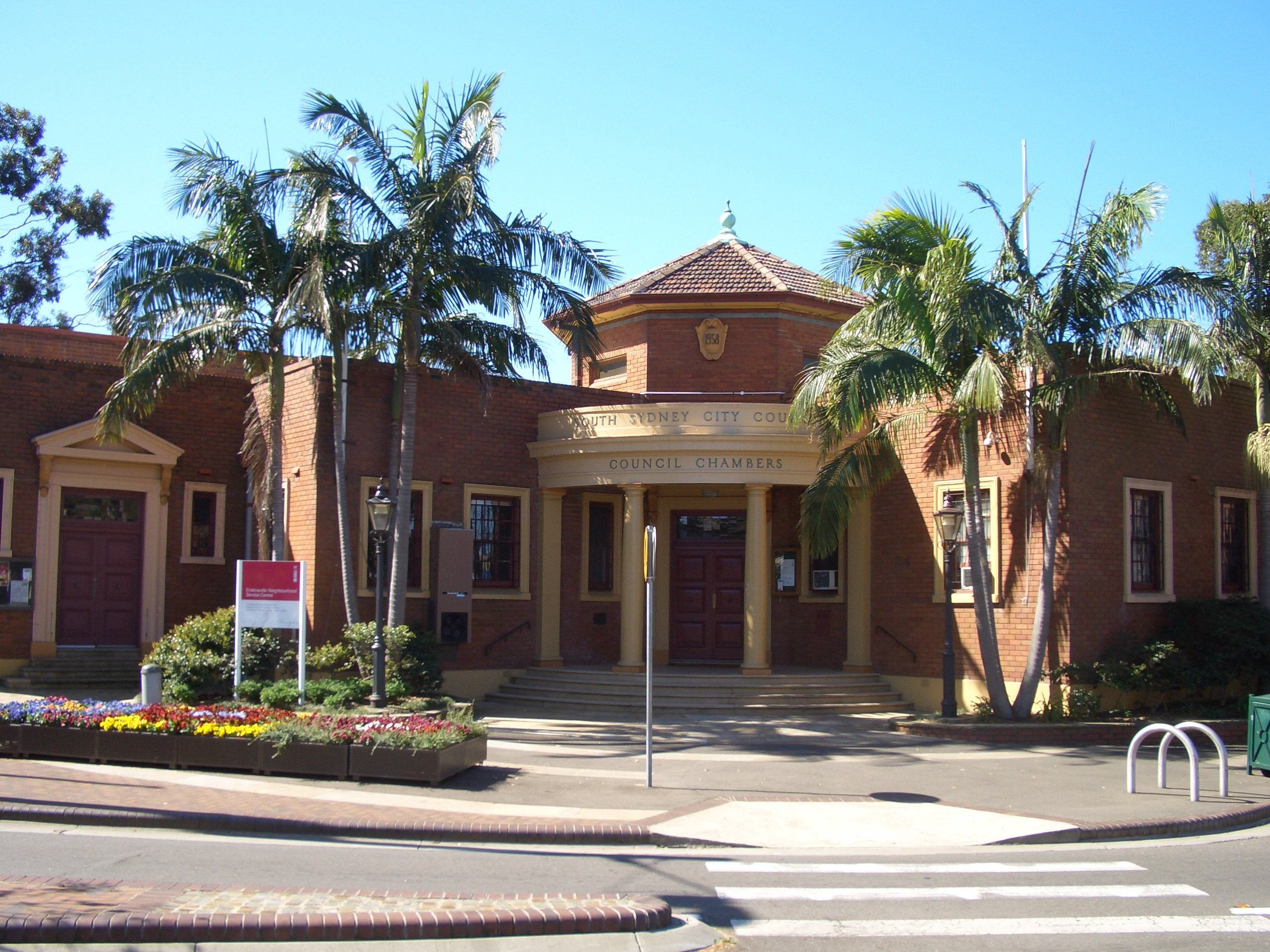
- Erskineville Town Hall

- Interactive map of Erskineville
- Country: Australia
- State: New South Wales
- City: Sydney
- LGA: City of Sydney
- Location: 6 km (3.7 mi) south west of Sydney CBD

Government
  - State electorate: *Heffron; Newtown
  - Federal division: Sydney

Area
  - Total: 0.81 km^{2} (0.31 sq mi)

Population
  - Total: 9,657 (SAL 2021)
  - Density: 11,922/km^{2} (30,880/sq mi)
- Postcode: 2043
Suburbs around Erskineville
Newtown	Macdonaldtown	Golden Grove/Eveleigh
Newtown	Erskineville	Alexandria
St Peters	Alexandria	Alexandria

Erskineville (previously known as Macdonaldtown) is a suburb in the Inner West of Sydney, New South Wales, Australia. It is located 6 kilometres south west of the Sydney central business district and is part of the local government area of the City of Sydney. Erskineville is a diverse suburb homing to a wide variety of ethnicity from its varying Southeast Europe and Aboriginal communities. Erskineville is colloquially known as Erko.

Erskineville is bordered by the suburbs of Newtown to the west, Redfern to the north, St Peters to the south, and Alexandria to the east. The locality of Macdonaldtown sits over the north-west border.

Erskineville is a residential suburb. Erskineville Oval is located on the eastern border of the suburb, and Sydney Park is at the southern edge.

== History ==
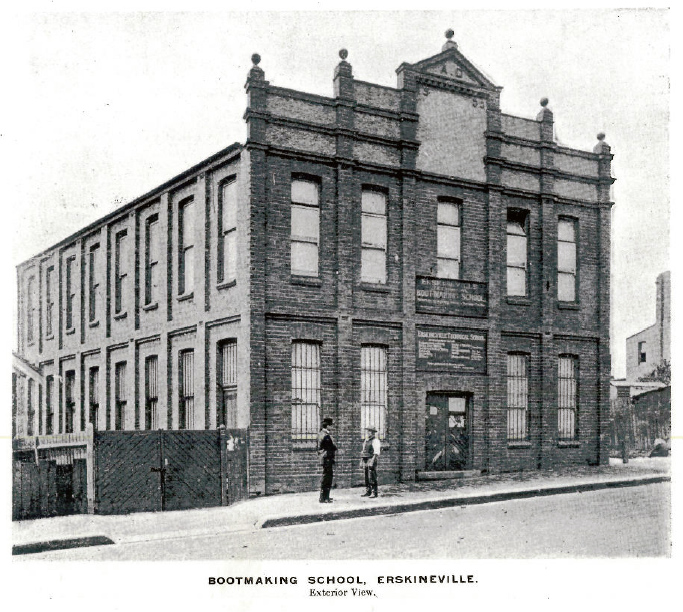
Erskineville Boot Making School, 1909

The suburb was originally called Macdonaldtown after an earlier subdivision in 1846 in the south of Erskineville owned by Stephen Macdonald.

The area of Macdonaldtown/Erskineville was established as a residential and farming area in the early 19th century. Nicholas Devine, the first principal superintendent of convicts called his land Burren Farm, after a region of County Clare in his native Ireland. Burren Farm would later become parts of Newtown and Macdonaldtown (now Erskineville). Devine Street is named after Nicholas Devine and Burren street is named after his farm.

The streets around the early Macdonaldtown subdivision are named after relations of the Macdonald family - Amy, Flora, Eve, Coulson and Rochford. Knight Street is named for Henry Knight, one of the earliest brickmakers in the district and the first mayor of Macdonaldtown.

Macdonaldtown Map 1886 -1889 (City of Sydney Archives)

Erskineville is named after Erskine Villa, the home of Wesleyan minister, Reverend George Erskine, built in 1830. After changing owners a few times, the property was eventually left to the Church of England and became the rectory for the Holy Trinity Church at Macdonaldtown (it was demolished in 1961 after serving as the rectory for eighty years).

The area was first incorporated on 23 May 1872, with the name of the "Municipal District of Macdonald Town" (but was variously known as the "Borough of Macdonald Town" or the "Municipality of Macdonaldtown"). On 19 July 1872, the first council, consisting of six aldermen in one electorate, was elected (Charles Brandling Henderson, Henry Knight, James Bryan, Alexander Swanson, William Irwin and James Heighington), with Henry Knight elected as the first mayor at the first meeting on 23 July 1872.

In 1893 Macdonaldtown was renamed as Erskineville, when the Parliament of New South Wales passed the "Borough of Erskineville Naming Act, 1893", effecting the municipal name change. In the late nineteenth century, the inhabitants were originally market gardeners, though brick making and tanning also became dominant industries. The Victorian cottages and small rows of Victorian terraces that dominate the built form of the suburb were the homes of the workers in these industries, which explains their smallness: a four-metre wide terrace is large by Erskineville standards.

In the early twentieth century, manufacturing in the area diversified, and Erskineville became a resolutely working class inner city suburb. In 1938 the Erskineville Public Housing Scheme was inaugurated on the western end of Erskineville Park, as an early response by the NSW Government to the Housing Improvement Act 1937 towards the problem of slum clearance in the inner city. From the 1970s, Erskineville underwent gentrification with new residents attracted to the village atmosphere, public transport links and the proximity to the CBD.

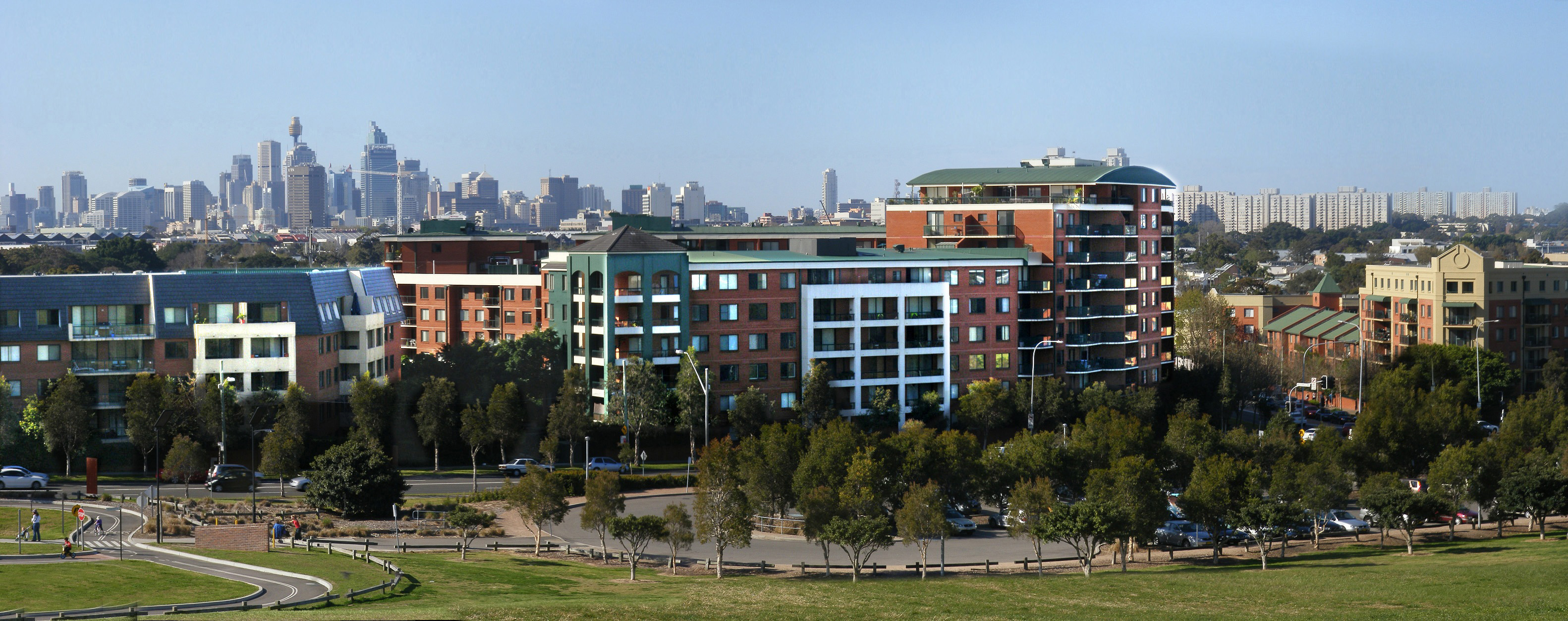
Sydney Park Road

From the 19th century until the second half of the 20th century, the south-eastern section of Erskineville was taken up by large industrial uses. Bakewell Brothers brick and pottery works operated until 1956, and Metters Limited had a large factory that made items such as the "Kooka" stove operating from 1907 to 1974. Steelworks like McPherson’s and Hadfields Steel Works also operated until the 1970s. The site of these industrial works were identified since 1998 as a site for urban renewal, with the land east of the rail line, south of Ashmore Street and north of Coulson Street known as the "Ashmore Estate". The Ashmore Estate is currently identified for major residential redevelopment as part of the urban renewal process.

In 1967, the Department of Main Roads (DMR) proposal to widen King Street was met with objections, mainly from shop owners. As a result the DMR studied an alternative north south route, which in the present day would depart from King St at Concord Street, then travel along Concord St, Flora St, George St (with the 'dog-leg' on MacDonald proposed to be realigned in Stage 2), and Charles or Burren St to Wilson Street - where an expressway was proposed along the current cycleway route.

In November 1973, the State Planning Authority published the Erskineville Study. The study area was bounded by King Street, Newtown Station, Erskineville Road and the Illawarra railway line. The state was involved because Clause 59 of Zone 2 (d) of the City of Sydney Planning Scheme required agreement of the Authority.

=== Erskineville Traffic Petition of 1985 ===
In 1971, two people were killed by cars on Union Street, and residents began petitioning their council for street closures. A number of Erskineville streets were closed on a trial basis from mid-1984. On Christmas Eve 1985, road barriers in 11 streets in Erskineville, Alexandria, Newtown and Redfern were ordered to be removed by the Minister for Local Government, Kevin Stewart, leading to a period of local unrest. On December 31st 1985, practically all the road closures were reinstated.

=== Enmore Road Link Road (Erskineville Road) ===
The eastern end of Erskineville Road is 24.5 to 25 metres wide, compared to 13 metres wide at the western end (from Septimus Street up). This is because the Roads & Traffic Authority originally planned for Erskineville Road to meet King Street through the Tram Sheds site. This scheme was also known as the Enmore Road Link Road.

In the 1970's a number of buildings were demolished by the Department of Main Roads with the intention of widening the road, as was common practice at the time.

The arterial road alignment was depicted as a connector between the proposed Southern Freeway/South Western Freeway and the Johnstons Creek Route.

On 15 October 2000, the Roads & Traffic Authority advised the City of South Sydney council that the Minister for Roads approved the abandonment of the County Road Corridor between King Street, Newtown, Sydney, Enmore Road and Erskineville Road. Abandonment of the arterial road reservation at 62-94 Erskineville Road was confirmed on 5 February 2001.

Plans for this proposal are held by the City of Sydney archives.

== Transport ==
=== Trams ===
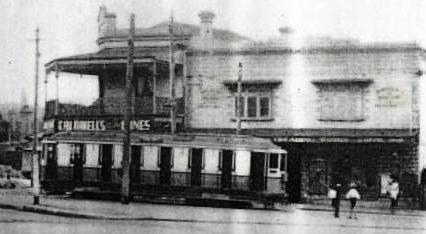
Tram at the Erskineville terminus

The Erskineville line opened as an electric double track tramway in 1909. It branched from tracks at Regent Street in Chippendale, and passed west along Meagher Street, then south into Abercrombie Street. It followed Abercrombie Street south across the junction with Cleveland Street through Golden Grove, before swinging south into Golden Grove Street then right into Wilson Street. The line then passed under the railway lines at Burren Street, adjacent to the entrance to Macdonaldtown railway station. The line then became a single track loop passing up Burren Street to Erskineville Road, then west along Erskineville Road to Septimus Street, then Albert Street before rejoining the tracks at Burren Street. Services operated from Circular Quay using the Pitt and Castlereagh Street lines. The line south of Cleveland Street closed in 1940, with the northern section used by other services until its closure in 1958.

The Henderson Road line was a short line that branched from the Alexandria line tracks at the corner of Henderson and Mitchell Roads in Alexandria and passed along Henderson Road to Park Street in Erskineville, and later to Bridge Street adjacent to Erskineville railway station. Services operated from Circular Quay with the line opening to Park Street in 1906 and to Bridge Street in 1909. The line was an electrified single track throughout. The line was an early closure in 1933 and was replaced by a private bus service that no longer operates.

=== Trains ===
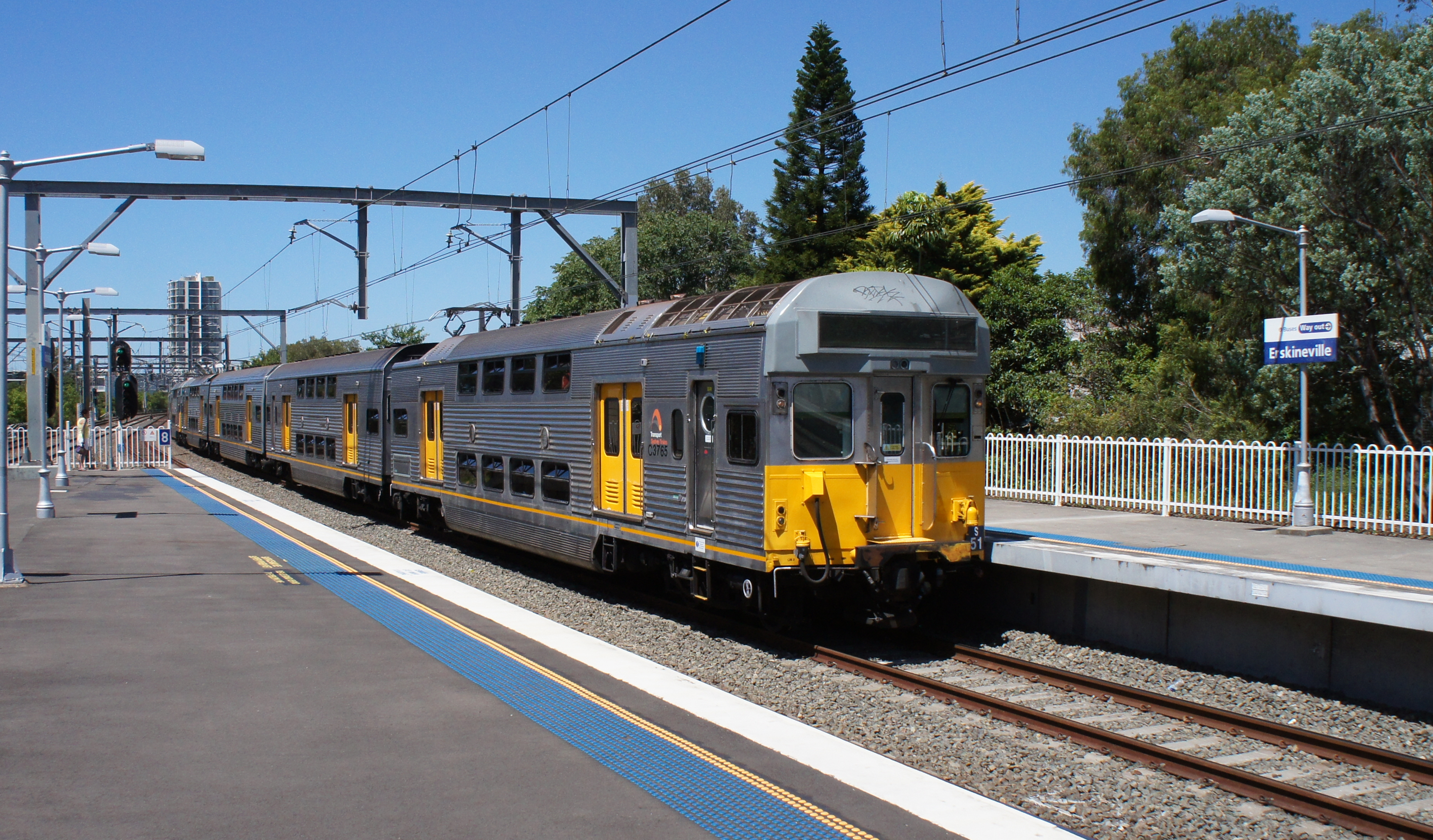
A train at Erskineville station

Heavy rail was extended south from Central railway station to Erskineville between 1884 and 1893 via the Illawarra railway line. Today, Erskineville is serviced by either the Airport & South Line or the Eastern Suburbs & Illawarra Line of the Sydney Trains network. Newtown railway station, Macdonaldtown railway station and St Peters railway station also service the suburb and are within close distance from the centre of Erskineville.

=== Buses ===
Transdev John Holland operate a service from Marrickville Metro shopping centre to Bondi Junction through Erskineville.

The 370 bus route, which runs through Erskineville, has been named one of the most unreliable bus routes in Sydney.

== Popular culture ==
- The Imperial Hotel at Erskineville is the famous drag show pub featured in the movie Priscilla, Queen of the Desert.
- Erskineville and the Inner West area were featured in the indie film, Erskineville Kings, one of the last projects that Hugh Jackman worked on before he was offered the role of Wolverine in X-Men, henceforth becoming a Hollywood movie star.
- Famed retro hard rock band Wolfmother was raised and formed here.
- A poster traced back to the Cicada 3301 online puzzle was in this suburb.

== Demographics ==
Historical population
Year	Pop.	±%
2001	4,818	—
2006	6,558	+36.1%
2011	6,848	+4.4%
2016	8,014	+17.0%
2021	9,657	+20.5%

At the 2021 census the population of Erskineville had risen to 9,657, from 8,014 residents in 2016. The most common reported ancestries were English 34.8%, Australian 24.4%, Irish 14.6%, Scottish 10.2% and Chinese 9.6%. 59.2% of people were born in Australia. The next most common countries of birth were England 7.7%, China 3.5% and New Zealand 3.2%. 76.6% of people spoke only English at home. Other languages spoken at home included Mandarin 3.7%, Spanish 1.7% and Cantonese 1.7%. The most common responses for religious affiliation were No Religion 65.8% and Catholic 12.5%. On the day of the Census, 6.2% of employed people used public transport as at least one of their methods of travel to work and 13.9% used car (either as driver or as passenger). The main housing types were flats or units 61.7%, semi-detached or townhouses 34.5% and separate houses 3.2%. Just over half of residents (53.3%) were renting, compared with the national average of 30.6%.

== Notable residents ==
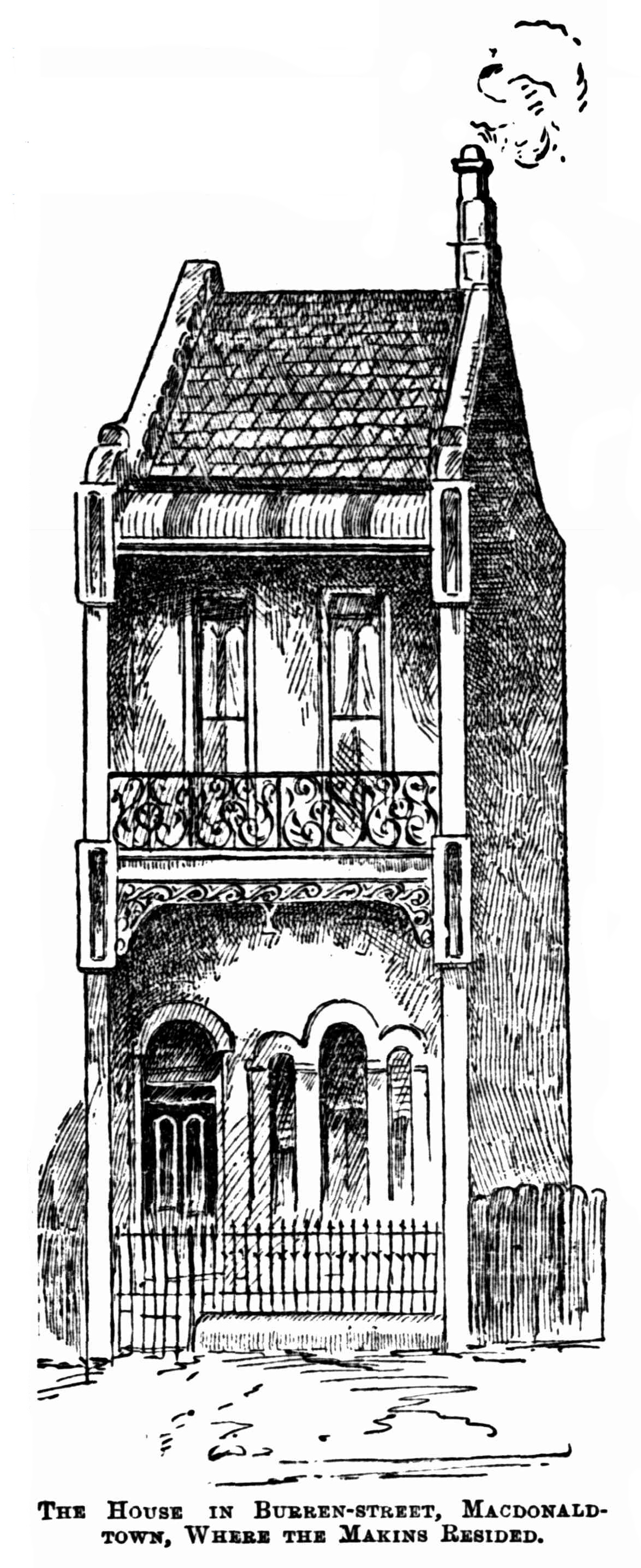
The house in Burren Street, Macdonaldtown (now Erskineville), where John and Sarah Makin resided (from the Illustrated Sydney News, 12 November 1892)

- John and Sarah Makin also known as the Hatpin Murderers were 'baby farmers' who were convicted for murder in 1892 after bodies were found buried in their yard.
- Stuart Challender, conductor, known for his work as chief conductor of the Sydney Symphony Orchestra.
- Myles Heskett, musician, member of Wolfmother
- Chris Ross, musician, member of Wolfmother
- Andrew Stockdale, musician, member of Wolfmother
- John Prior, musician, composer and producer
- Jon Cleary, novelist
- Felix Dean, actor known for his recurring role as V. J. Patterson on soap opera Home and Away
- Natalie Imbruglia singer and former actress
- Daniel Johns, member of Silverchair and The Dissociatives
- John Kennedy, singer/songwriter of King Street, Miracle (in Marrickville)
- Paul Mac, musician and DJ, member of The Lab, Itch-E and Scratch-E, The Dissociatives, and silverchair
- Jackie Orszaczky, musician, orchestrator, composer, bandleader
- Urthboy, Australian solo hip hop artist and member of The Herd
- David White, Academy Award-winning sound designer, known for his work on Mad Max: Fury Road (2015), Dark City (1998) and The Railway Man (2013)

== Education ==
There are two schools within Erskineville itself, both catering for the primary-level (K–6):

- Erskineville Public School, established 1883, is a public primary school on Swanson Street.
- St Mary's Catholic Primary School, established 1887, is a private Catholic school and has been on its current site on Swanson Street since 1912.

In addition, Erskineville is serviced by several public secondary schools. The suburb itself is within the catchment-area of the Newtown High School of the Performing Arts, while Alexandria Park Community School (K–12), Marrickville High School and Tempe High School are the closest comprehensives.

== Ashmore Precinct ==
The Ashmore Precinct is one of Sydney's biggest urban development projects. The current planning controls are the Sydney Local Environment Plan 2012 and the Sydney Development Control Plan 2012. Urban design principles included human scale streets with street wall heights, taller buildings around the park, and no towers. Traffic considerations were considered a significant constraint to be considered in the original masterplan.

A number of transport and traffic studies have been undertaken. Arup Group conducted traffic and parking usage surveys during November 2003 for a 2005 study. Transport studies of the precinct were undertaken under the 2006 Ashmore Precinct site Development Control Plan (Note: Approved by Council on 7 August 2006.), and later 2009 Urban Design Study and draft 2011 City Plan. A 2009 transport study reviewed the proposed road network. A 2012 transport report noted access to the neighbourhood would primarily be focused on Mitchell Road to "protect the residential areas to the north and west". In 2013, the City of Sydney commissioned AECOM to undertake a traffic and parking study of the proposed urban planning., which included modelling using Paramics, and recommended the signalisation of Maddox Street and Mitchell Road. The study modelled intersection Level of Service using a trip generation rate of 0.29 peak hour vehicle trips per dwelling, per RMS 2002. An area-wide transport study was undertaken after the opening of the St Peters Interchange.

As of November 2025, new traffic signals and a connecting road to the Ashmore Precinct are proposed to be installed at Maddox Street and Mitchell Road. (Note: On the route of the 370 and 308 bus routes as of March 2026.) Benefits of the signalised intersection are removal of delays caused by pedestrians to vehicles on Mitchell Road, and increasing vehicle capacity accessing and exiting the Ashmore Precinct.

Installation of traffic signals is a condition of consent of the Ashmore Precinct property development. and part of a Voluntary Planning Agreement. (Note: Which was varied in 2019.) Replacement of the roundabout with signals was imposed as a condition of development consent on the development site, so was not was not part of the 2023 targeted community engagement. While Coronation Property (Note: Developer of 17,770 square metres of the estate) initially sought to delay installation of traffic signals, in August 2024 they amended their application to seek consent for the installation, as Schedule 3 of the Voluntary Planning Agreement requires them. The intersection was attributed to cost $443,576.

In 2025, community opposition emerged due to concern of the proposed road increasing traffic (or rat running). A consultant report found a signalised or give way priority intersection would balance "an acceptable degree of priority for people who walk and cycle" and minimise bus impacts, and that a roundabout would impact public transport and road network performance. The traffic signals were simulated to have a cycle time of 120 seconds as simulations predicted a 90 second cycle time would delay southbound buses.

On 18 May 2026, the City of Sydney published a traffic analysis. As of July 2026, investigations on Maddox Street are paused and was looking into traffic lights on Mitchell Road and Harley and Ashmore Streets.

== Heritage ==
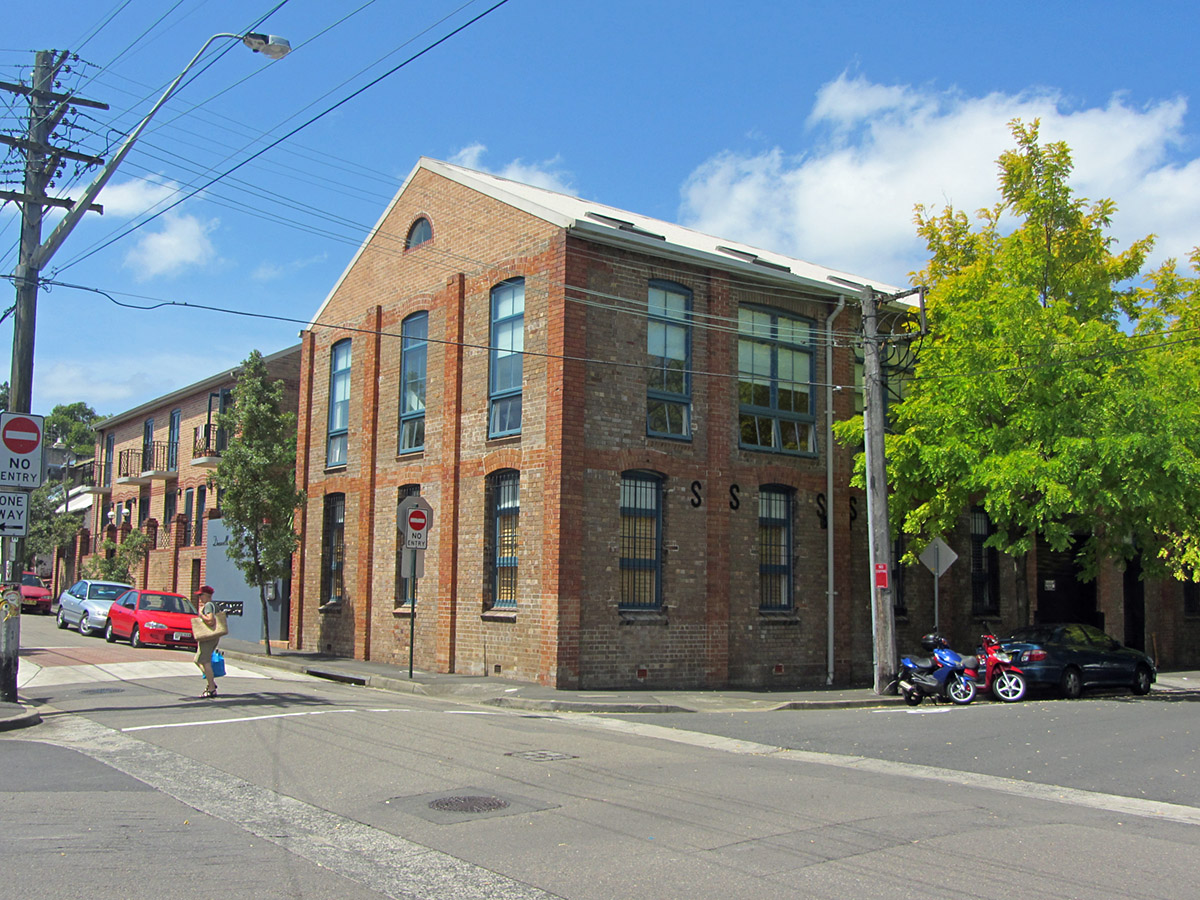
A converted factory in Erskineville.

=== Heritage Conservation Areas ===
Erskineville is covered by HCAs in approximately 75% of its area. These include:

- Burren Estate Heritage Conservation Area, covering the northern triangle of the suburb bounded with Newtown, including the Town Hall.
- Toogood and White's Estate Heritage Conservation Area, located south of Erskineville Road to Victoria Street.
- Former Macdonaldtown Heritage Conservation Area, covers the suburb from Munni Street south the Bray Street west of the rail line.
- Pleasant Avenue Heritage Conservation Area, located south of the Former Macdonaldtown HCA between Rochford Street and Smiths Lane down to Macdonald Street.
- King Street Heritage Conservation Area (part), shared with Newtown, is located in Erskineville south of Union Street and ends at Concord Street.
- Erskineville Estate Heritage Conservation Area, covers the 1885 Macdonaldtown Park and the inter-war Erskineville Housing Scheme.
- Malcolm Estate Heritage Conservation Area, covers the suburb east of the Station including the Public School, west of Binning Street and along Ashmore Street.
- Kingsclear Road Heritage Conservation Area (part), shared with Alexandria, covers the suburb south of Railway Parade, west of Park Street and east of Sydney Street.

=== Items listed on the Sydney Local Environmental Plan ===
- former Cosmopolitan Hotel (1880–1910), on 11 Charles Street, is a former hotel in the late Victorian style with a second floor added in the Federation Free Classical style c. 1910 designed by Lindsay Thompson.
- former Bakewell Brothers south-east warehouse (now Brightwell Transport site; 1914–1919), on 7-19 Coulson Street, is a former warehouse of the Bakewell brick and pottery works listed in 2016 as a result of the 2014 City of Sydney Industrial and Warehouse Buildings heritage study.
- Imperial Hotel (c. 1940), on 35-37 Erskineville Road, is an Inter War Functionalist style pub designed by Virgil Dante Cizzio.
- Holy Trinity Anglican Church Group (1885–1961), on 55 Erskineville Road, includes the 1885 church designed by the Blacket brothers, sons of Edmund Blacket.
- Erskineville Hotel (1940), on 102 Erskineville Road, is an Art Deco pub designed by Copeman, Lemont & Keesing.
- Erskineville Town Hall (1938), on 104 Erskineville Road, was designed in the Inter-War Mediterranean style by Lindsay Scott and served as the seat of the Municipality of Erskineville until 1948 and the City of South Sydney until 2003.
- The facade of the former St Peter's Theatre (1927), on 672 King Street, is the Federation Romanesque style facade remaining of the picture theatre designed by Emil Sodersten.
- Former factory chimney stack (1916), on 127 Railway Parade, is a remnant chimney stack "significant for its connection to Australian manufacturing of hosiery and underwear during the 1920s and 1940s, gramophones and records in the 1920s and 1930s and textiles between the 1940s and 1980s." Listed in 2016 as a result of the 2014 City of Sydney Industrial and Warehouse Buildings heritage study
- former Macdonaldtown Post Office (c. 1873), on the corner of Rochford and Knight Streets, was built by Henry Knight, a mayor of Macdonaldtown.
- Erskineville Public School (from 1883), on 13 Swanson Street, was first designed by C.H.E. Blackmann and Varney Parkes, in the Victorian Free classical style.
- Rose of Australia Hotel (1934), on the corner of Swanson Street and George Street, is an Inter War Free Classical style pub designed by Prevost and Ruwald.
- St Mary's Catholic Church Group (1912), on 21-23 Swanson Street, was built in the Federation Arts & Crafts style as a memorial to Rev. Father Reginald Bridge, designed by J.McCarthy.
- former Cleveland Shoe Company factory (1923), on 18-20 Victoria Street, is a former factory designed in the inter-war Chicagoesque style listed in 2016 as a result of the 2014 City of Sydney Industrial and Warehouse Buildings heritage study.

=== Items listed by NSW Government Agencies ===
- Erskineville Railway Station Group (c. 1910–1913), is listed under the RailCorp heritage register and is also listed under the Sydney LEP.
- Electricity Substation No. 101 (1919), on 1A Ashmore Street, is listed under the Ausgrid Heritage Register and is also listed under the Sydney LEP.

== Gallery ==
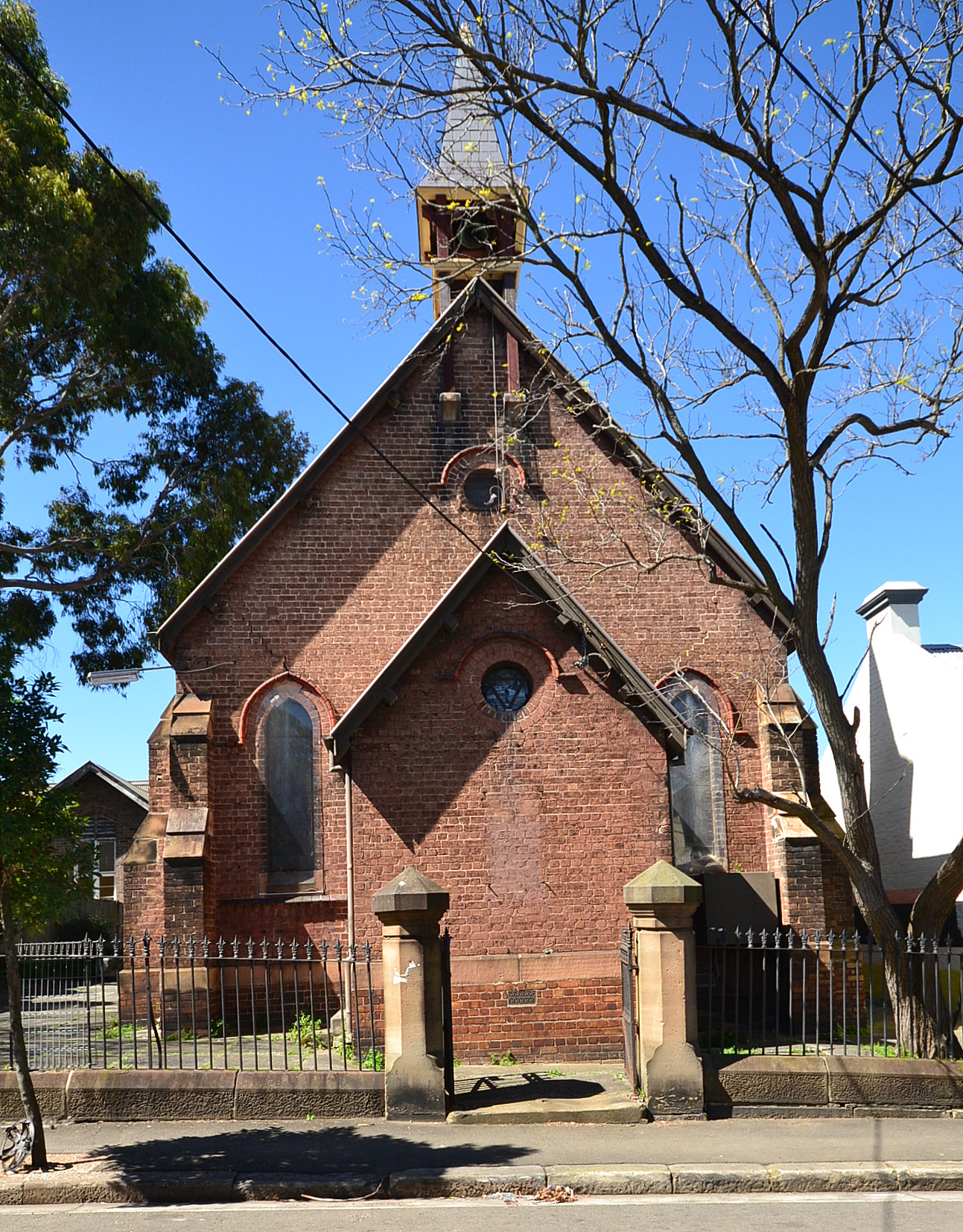
Holy Trinity Anglican Church

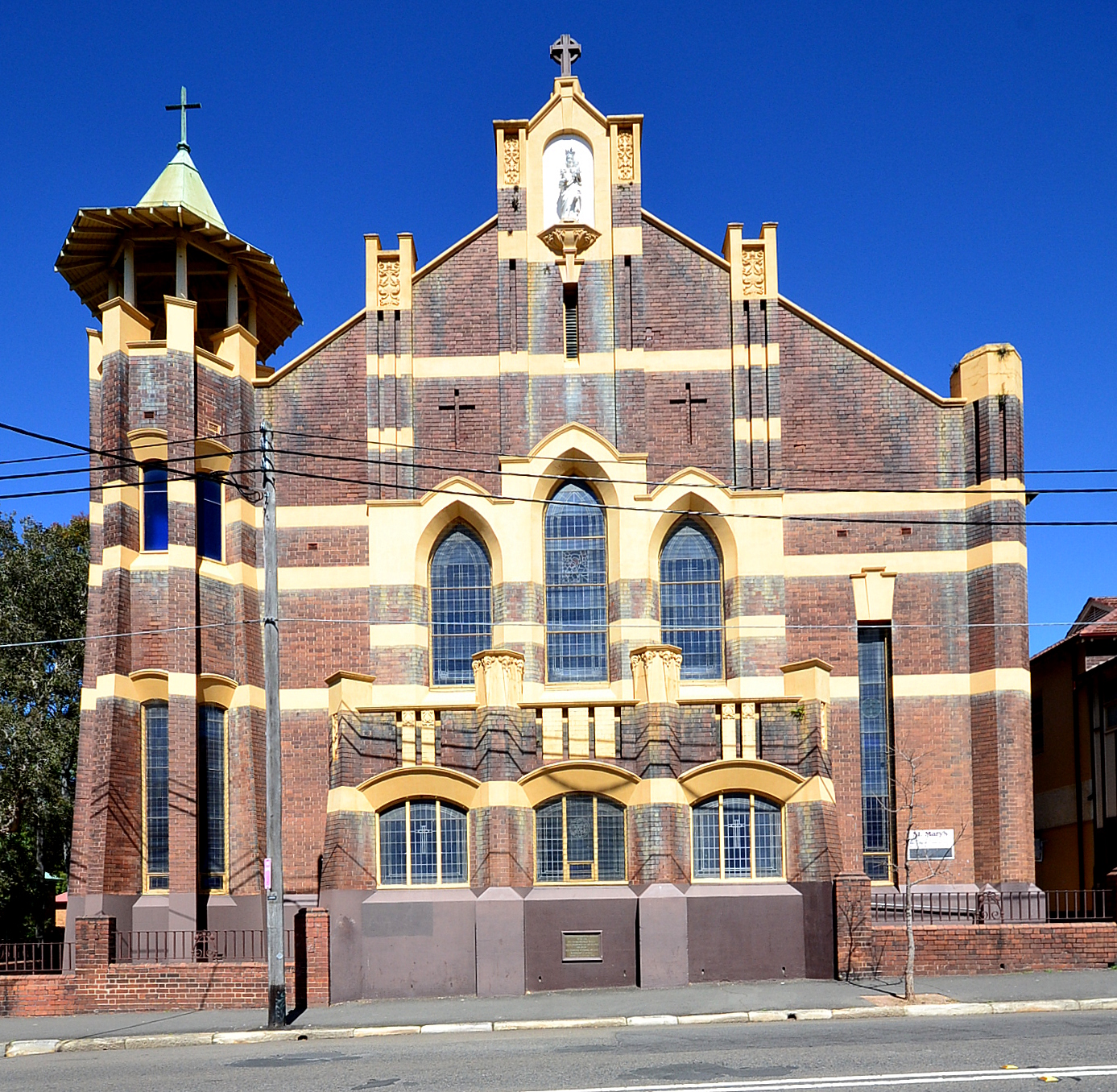
St Mary's Catholic Church

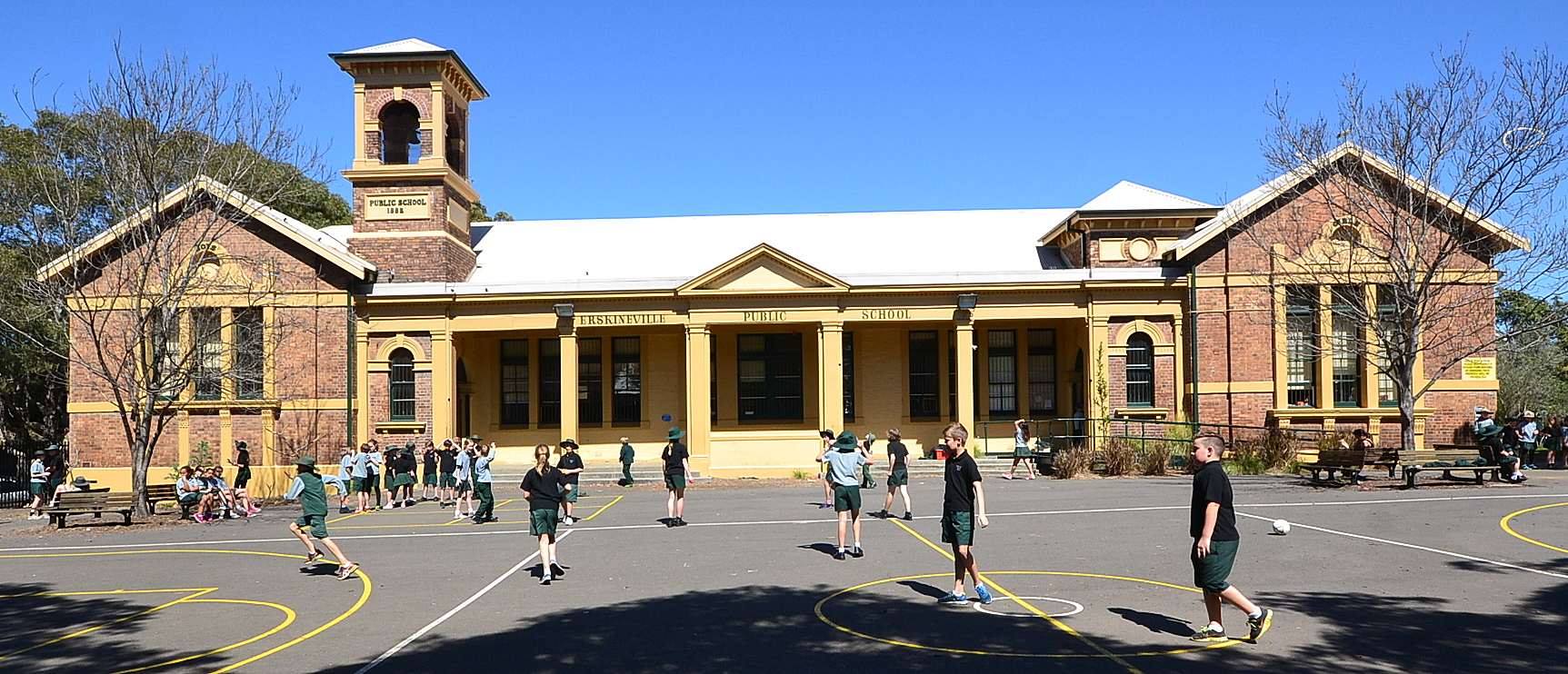
Erskineville Public School

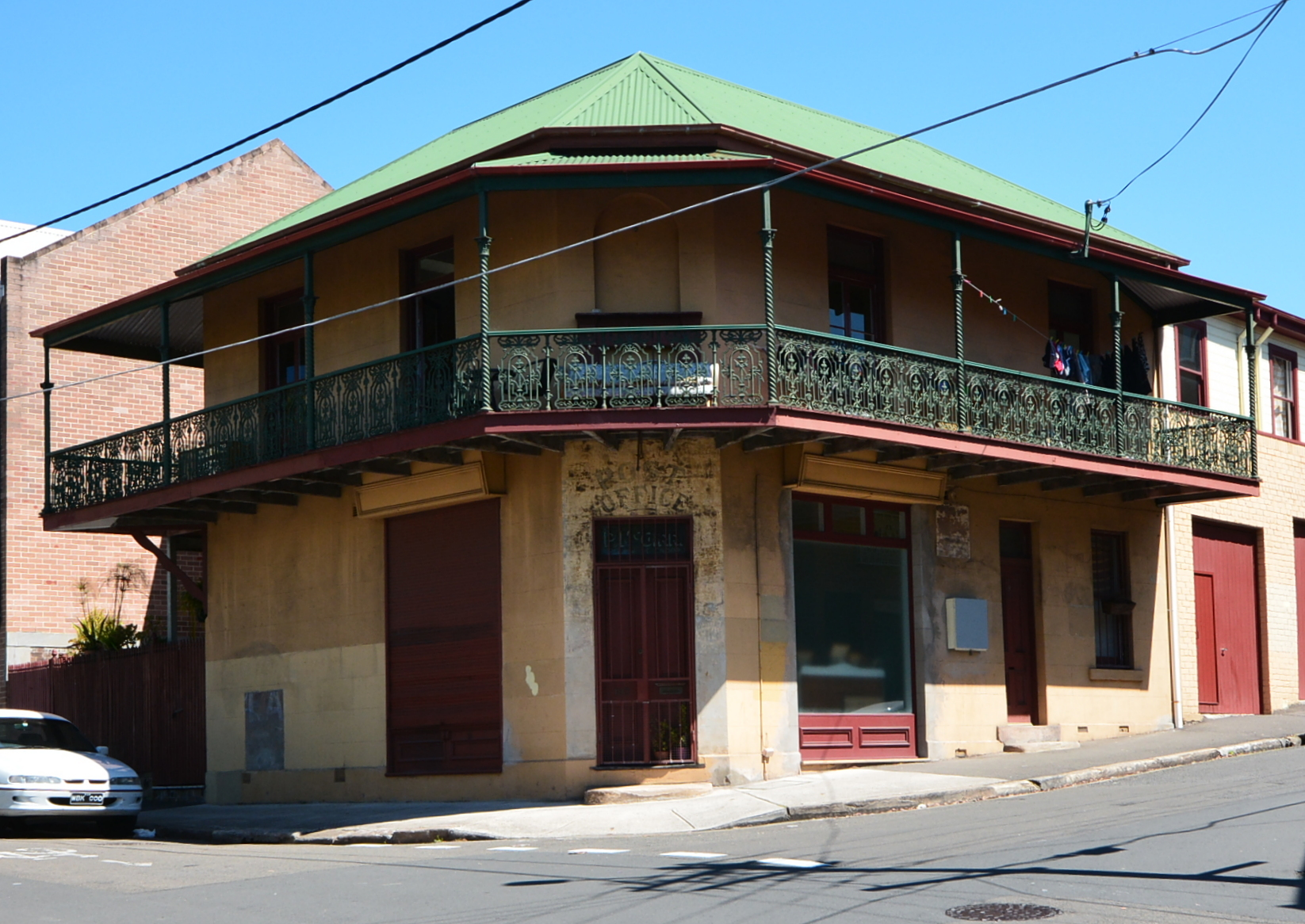
Former Macdonaldtown Post Office, Rochford Street

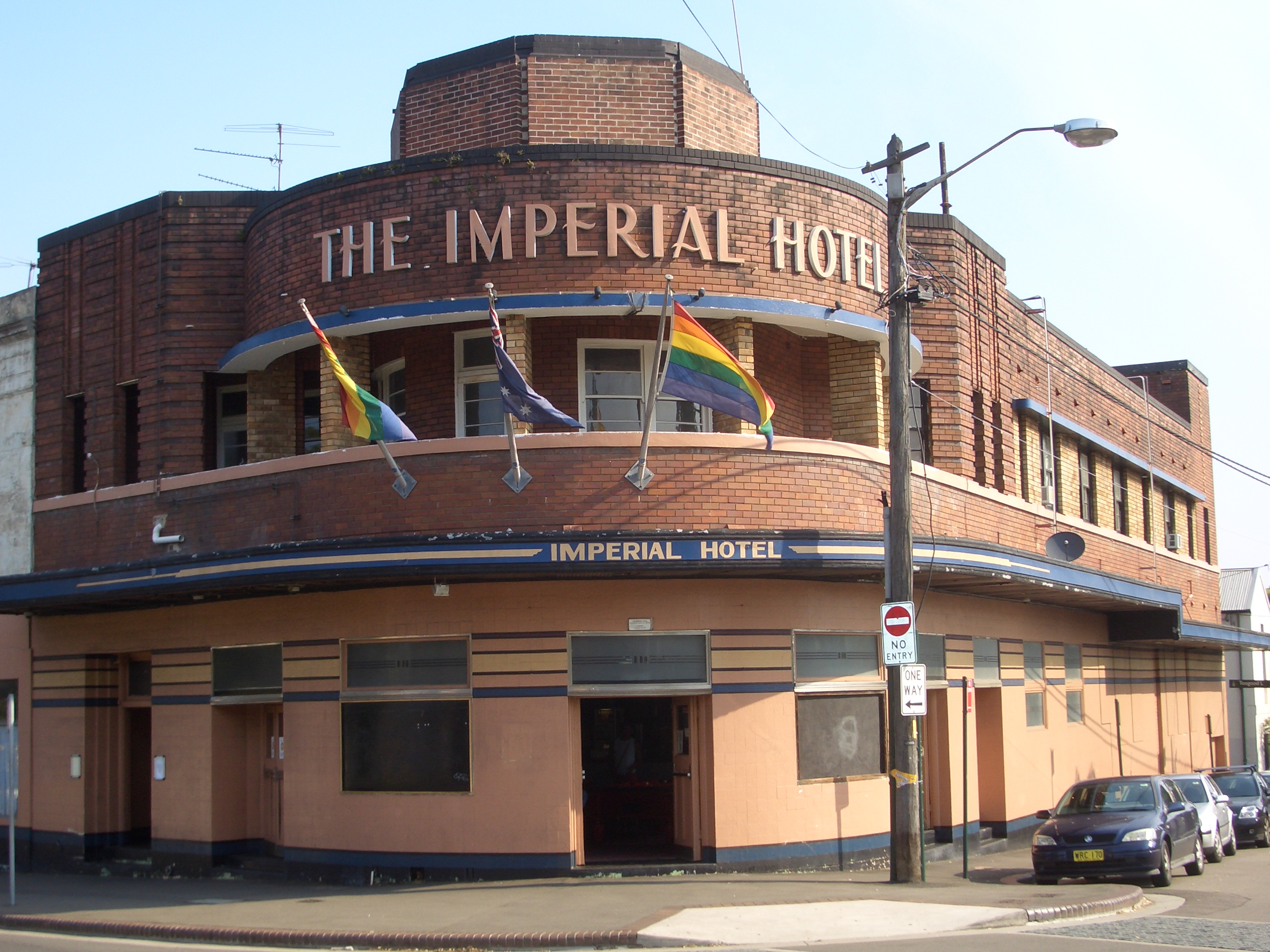
Imperial Hotel

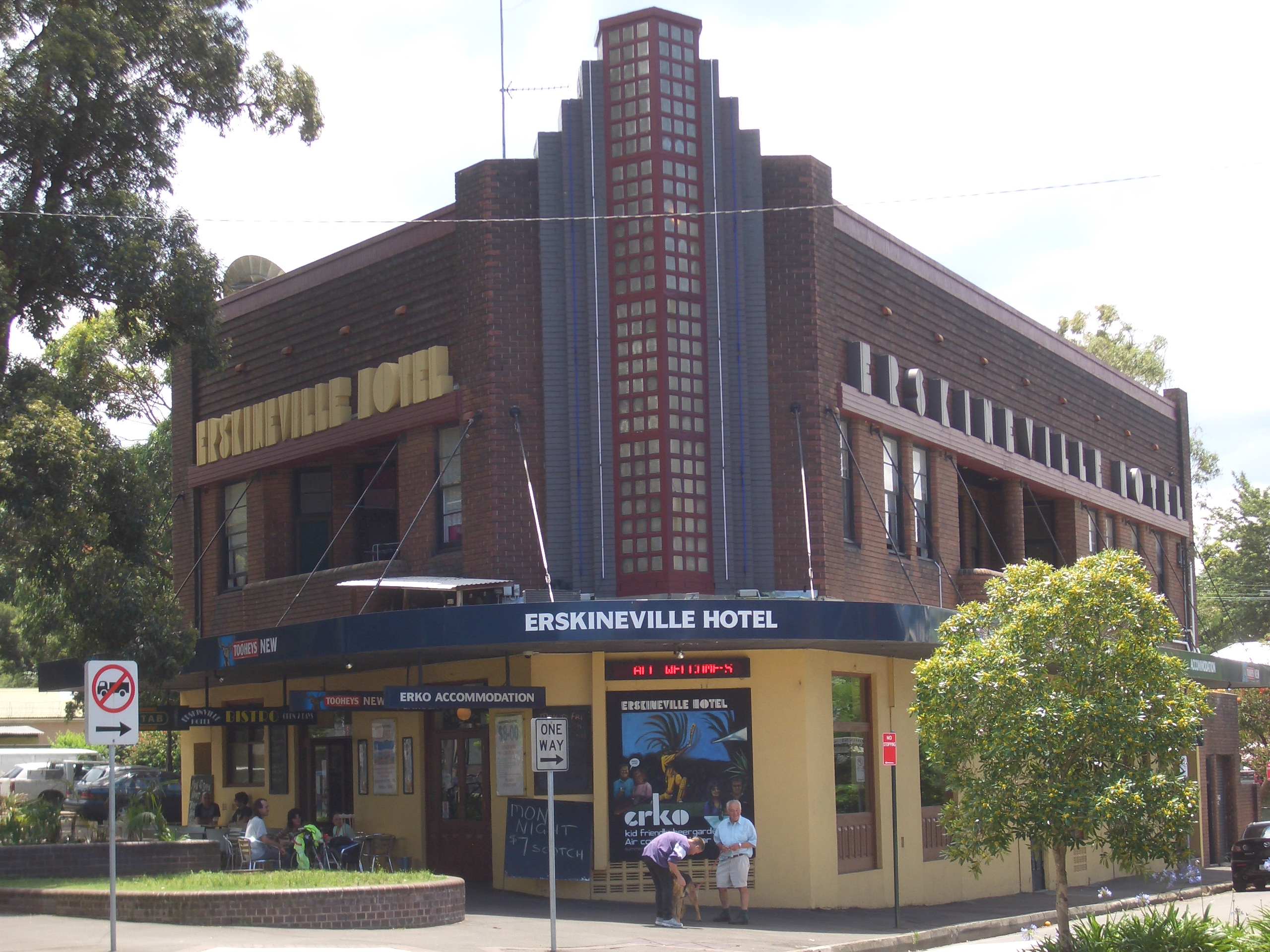
Erskineville Hotel ("The Erko")

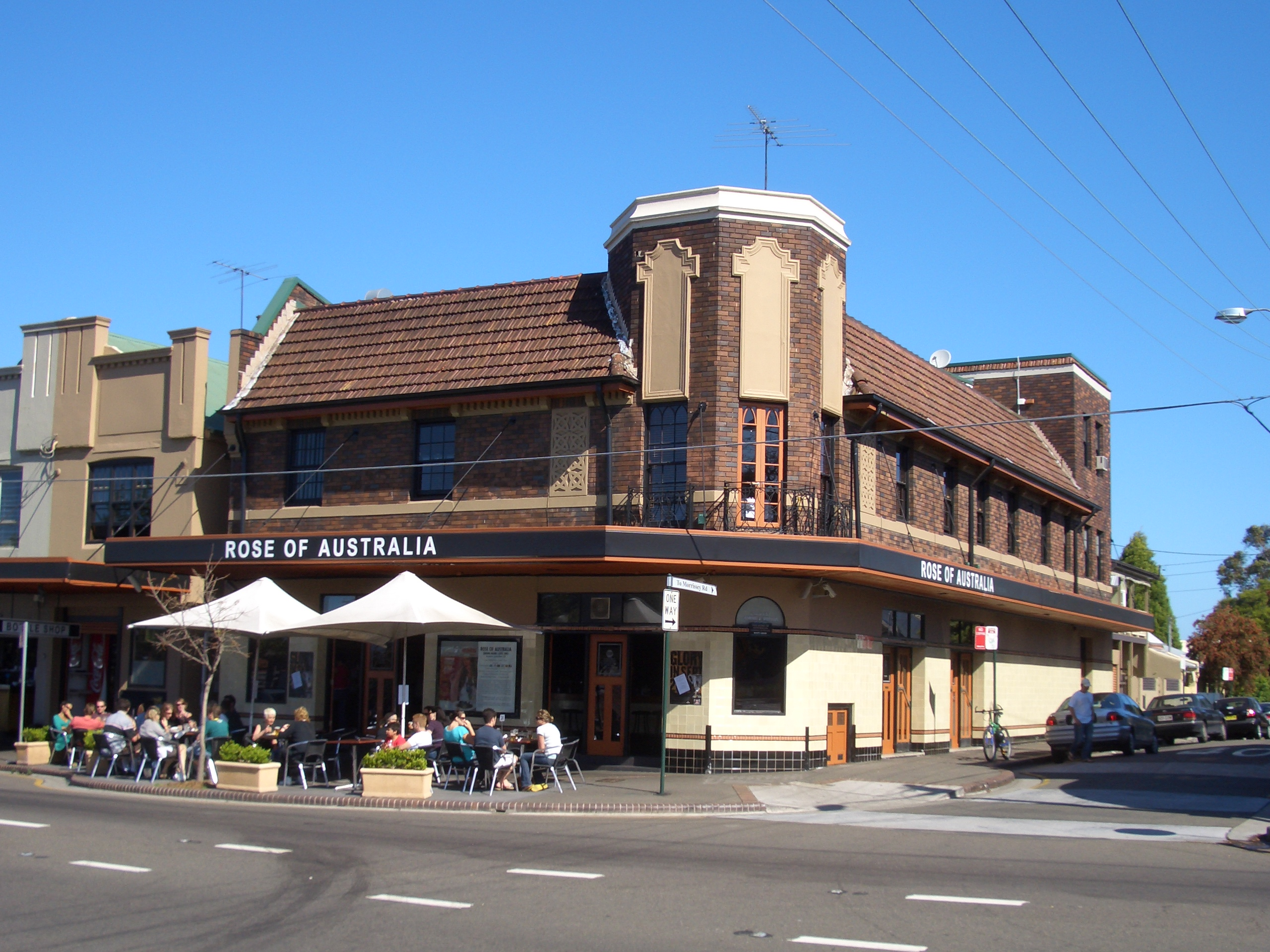
Rose of Australia Hotel

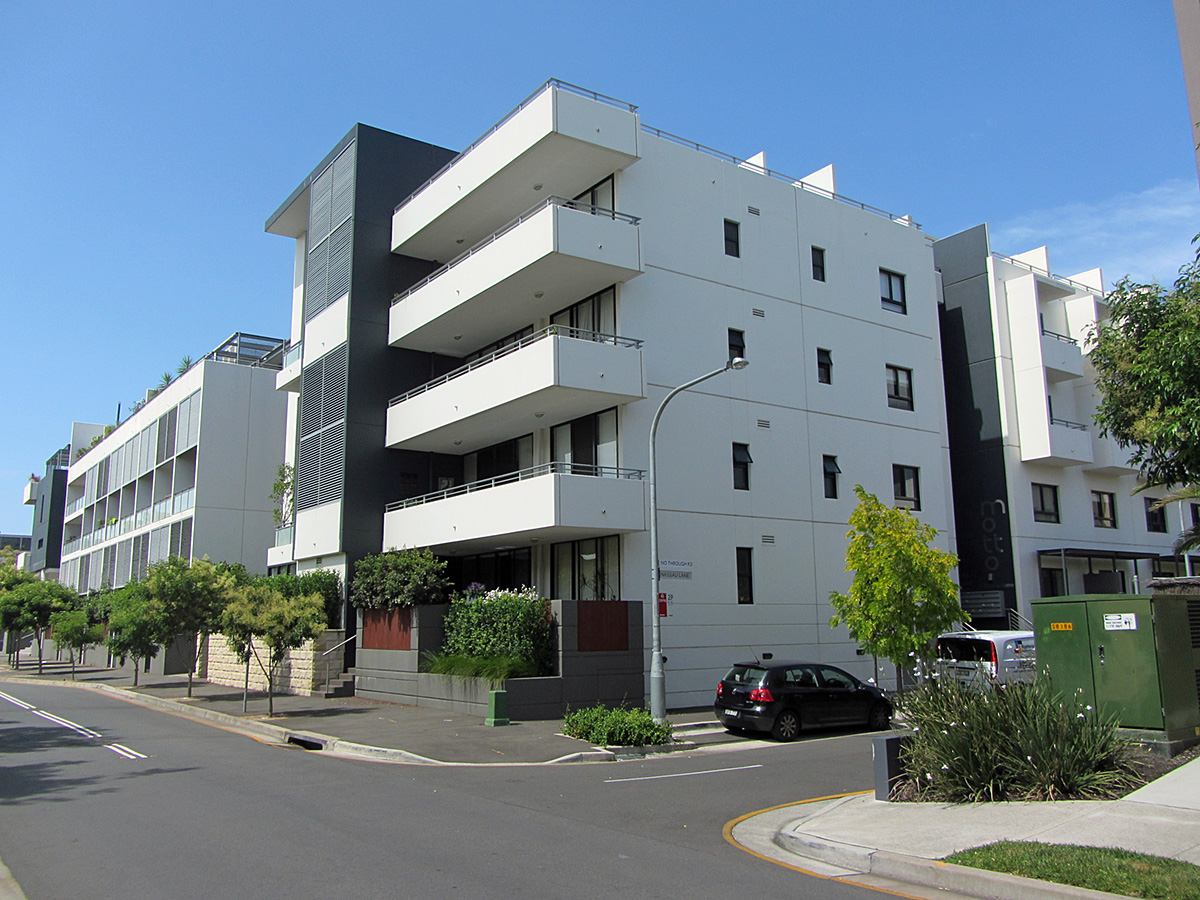
Contemporary apartments in the Ashmore Estate

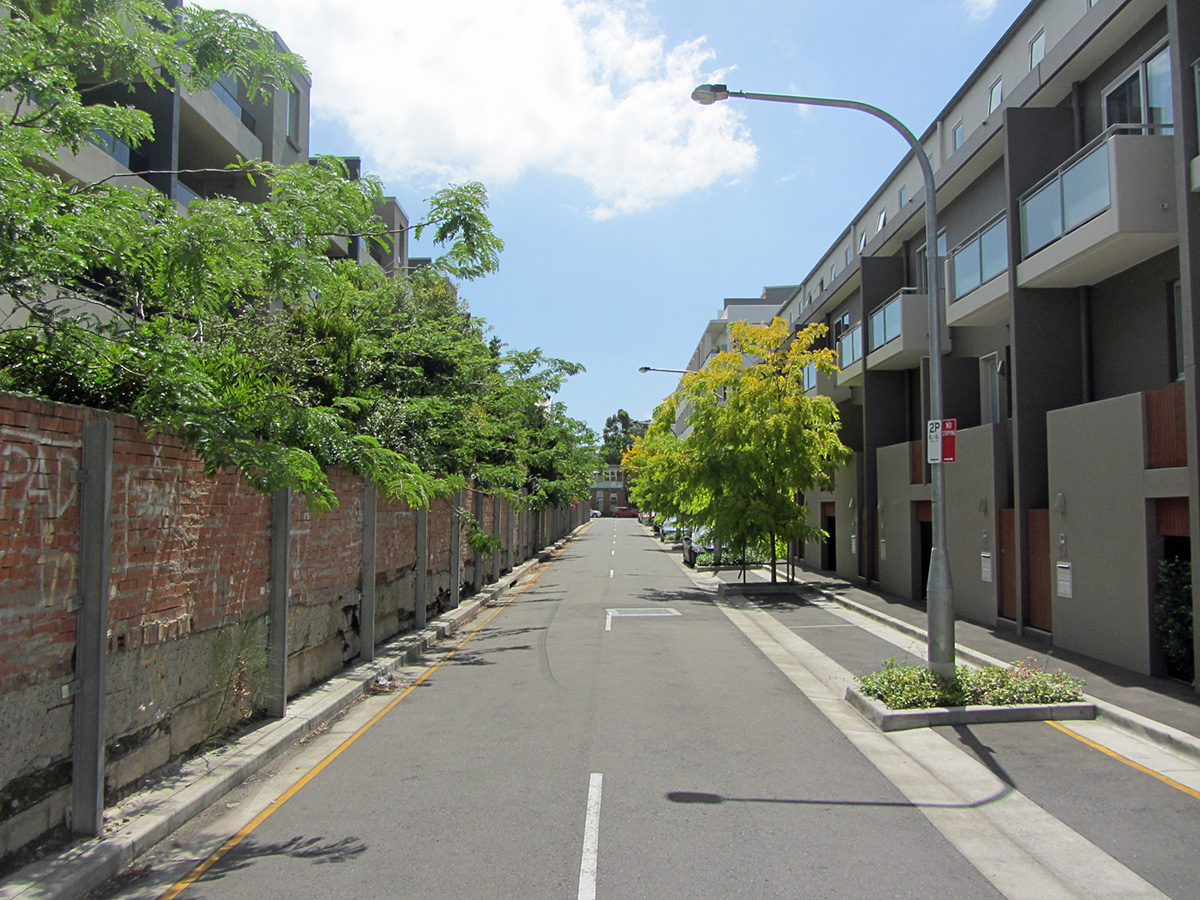
Laneway in Erskineville

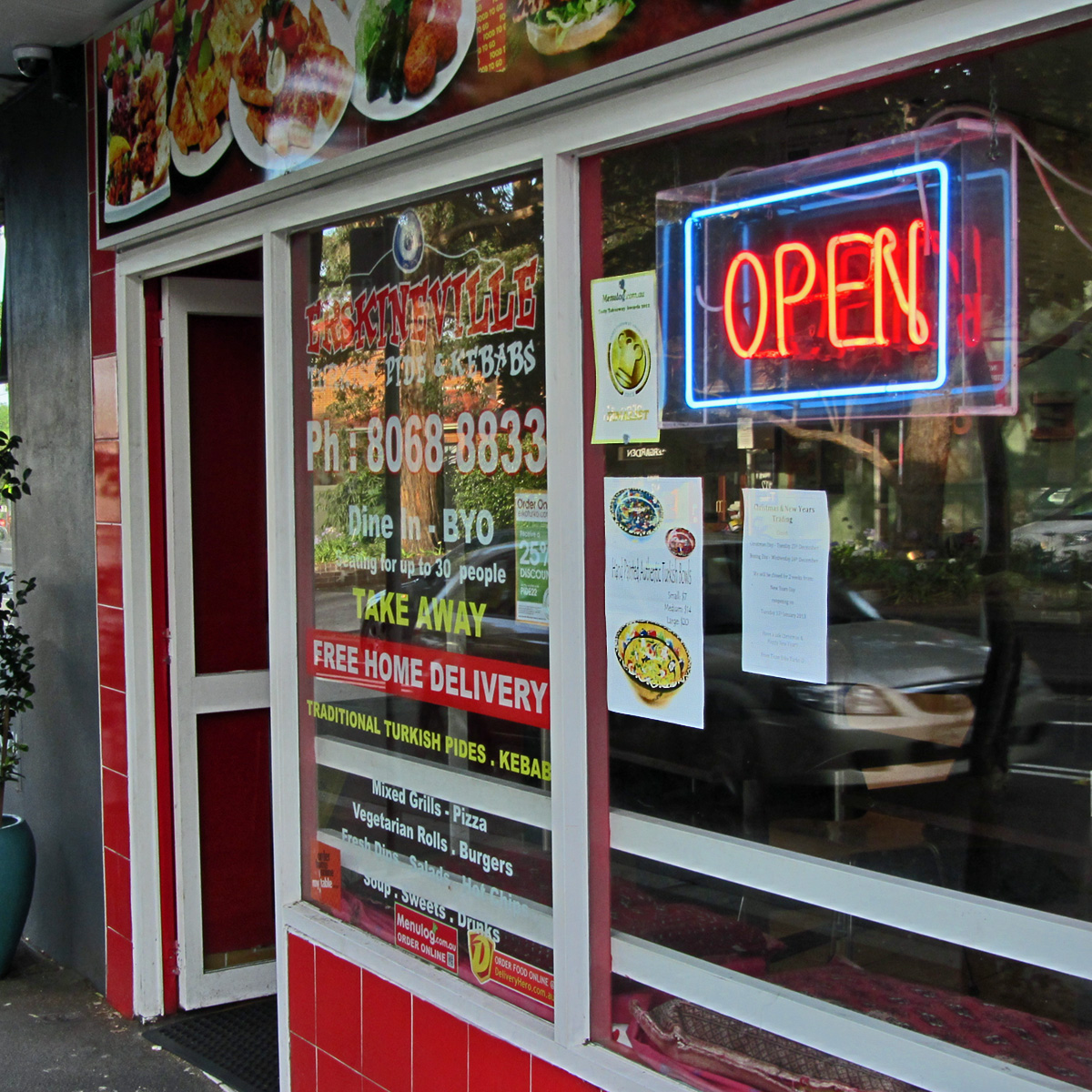
Kebab shop

== See also ==
- Newtown area graffiti and street art
