= St Andrew's Presbyterian Church, Manly =

St Andrew's Presbyterian Church
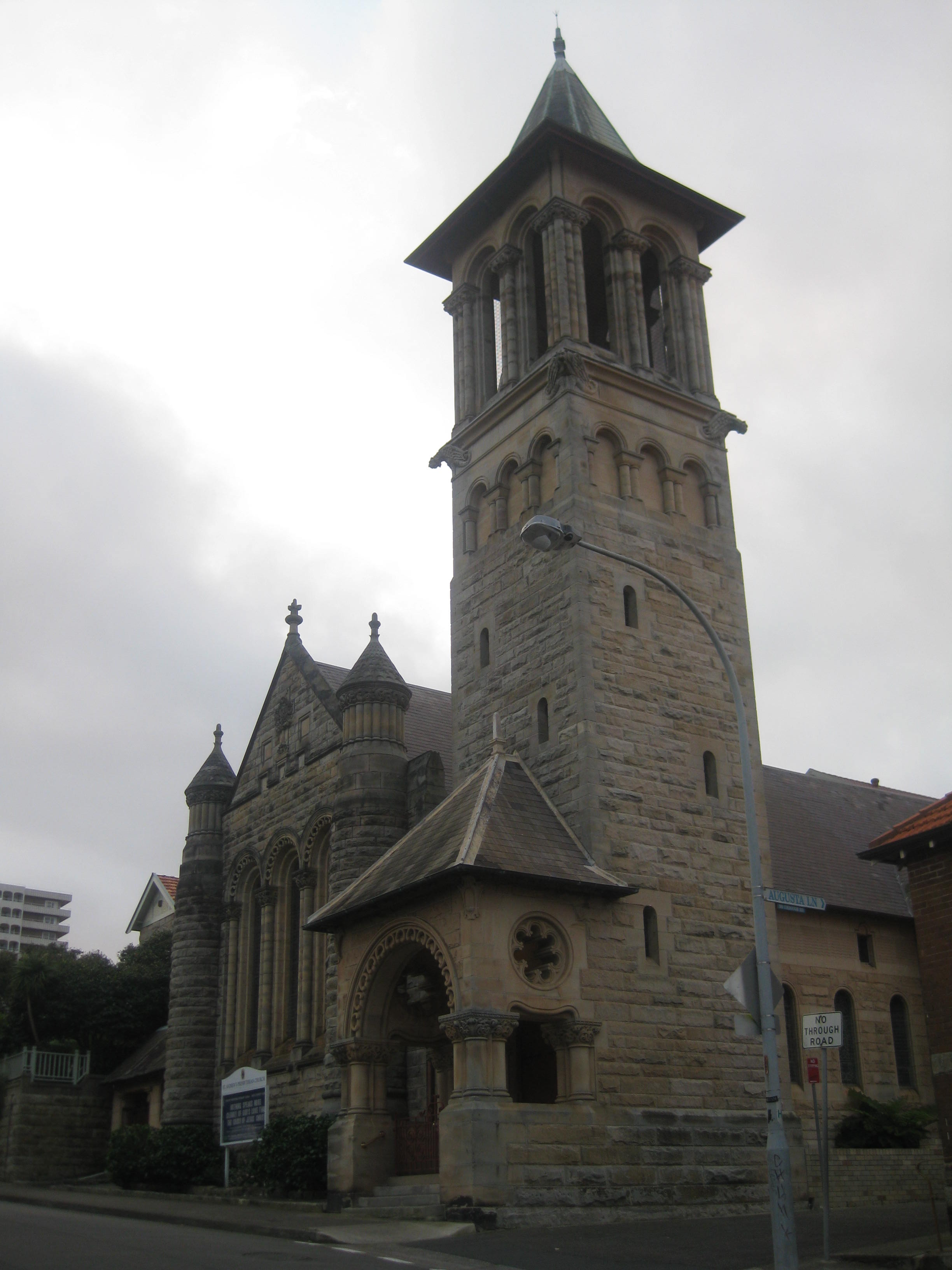
- The front, tower corner of the church looking up Raglan Street
- St Andrew's Presbyterian Church
- 33°47′42″S 151°17′00″E
- Location: Raglan Street, Manly, New South Wales
- Country: Australia
- Denomination: Presbyterian
- Website: www.stamp.org.au

History
- Status: Church
- Dedication: Saint Andrew

Architecture
- Functional status: Active
- Architects: Sir John Sulman; Jasper Swan (renovations)
- Architectural type: Church
- Style: Victorian Romanesque
- Years built: 1889-1890

Specifications
- Capacity: 400 people
- Materials: Sydney sandstone

Administration
- Division: New South Wales

St Andrew's Presbyterian Church is a Presbyterian church at Raglan Street, Manly, a suburb of Sydney, New South Wales, Australia.

The foundation stone for the church was laid in 1889. Designed by Sir John Sulman, the church is recognized as being one of the best examples of the Romanesque building style in Australia. The church was never completed due to a lack of funds. In 1960 using funds raised by the parishioners and a Government Grant work commenced on completing the church. A temporary north facing wall was removed and the church was completed by adding a new pulpit, altar, choir loft and vestry.

== Gallery ==
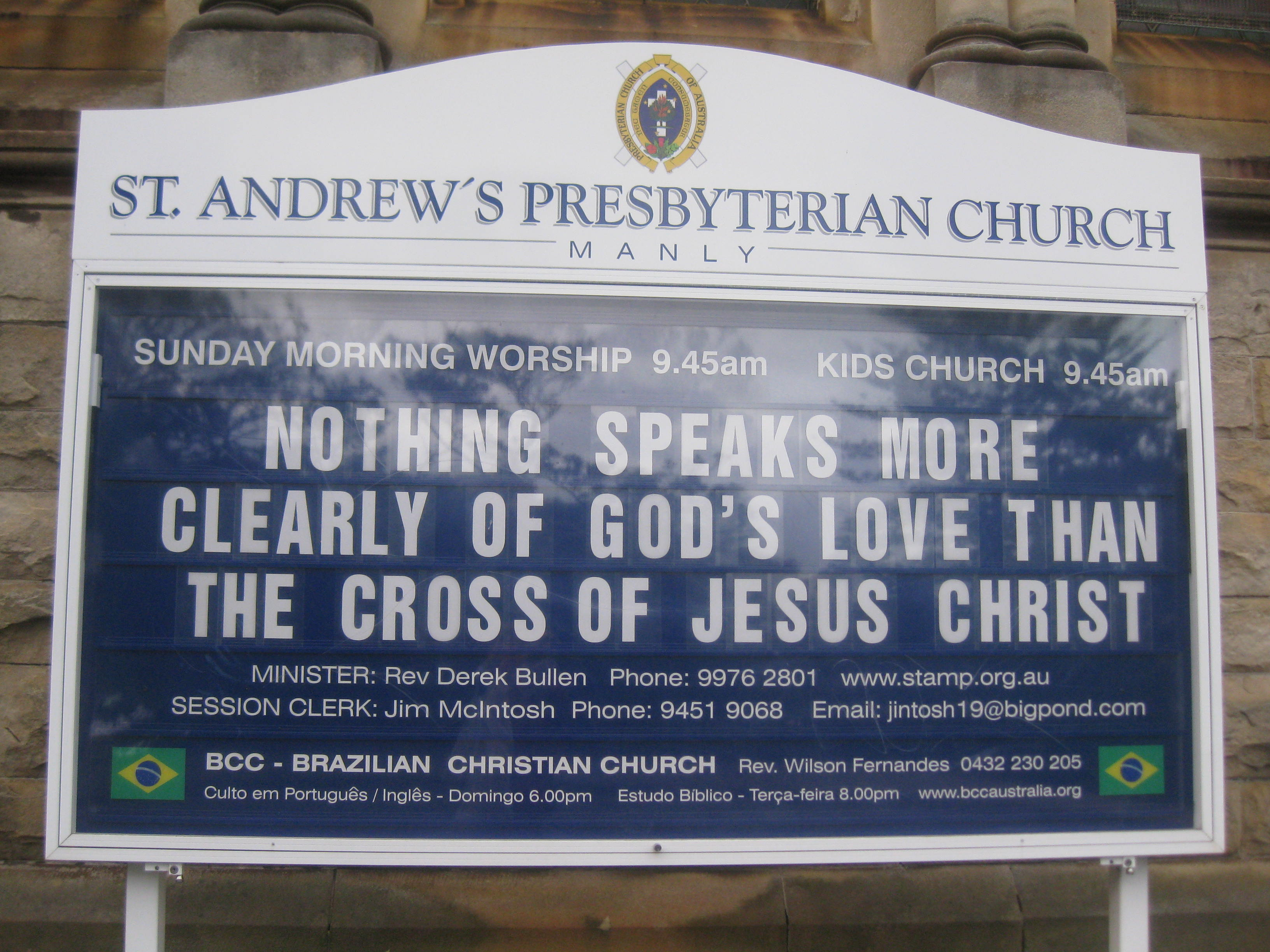
Front sign on Raglan Street
