= Marrickville High School =

Location
- 2 Centennial St, Marrickville; Sydney, New South Wales, 2204; Australia

Information
- Type: Public, secondary, co-educational, day school
- Motto: Aspire, Connect, Thrive
- Established: 1974
- Principal: Mr. Steven Holz
- Years offered: 7–12
- Enrolment: ~640
- Campus: Suburban
- Colour
- Website: marrickvil-h.schools.nsw.gov.au

Marrickville High School is a co-educational, public secondary school, located in Marrickville, an inner western suburb of Sydney, New South Wales, Australia. The school is administered by the New South Wales Department of Education. Established in 1974, the school follows a non-selective enrolment policy and serves approximately 640 students from Years 7 to 12. It includes a Support Unit for students with special needs and an Intensive English Centre (IEC), which provides English language support for newly arrived non-English speaking student.

== History ==
Marrickville High School's Quadrangle in 1974

=== Early history ===
The origins of Marrickville High School date back to 1865, when Thomas Chalder donated land on Chapel Street, Marrickville, for the establishment of Marrickville Public School. The school expanded with several acquisitions, including the purchase of Marrickville’s old Council Chambers in 1878, which was converted into a teacher’s residence.

=== Marrickville Girls' High School ===
In 1922, the Old Marrickville Town Hall on Illawarra Road was repurposed as Marrickville Junior Technical High School. By 1929, Marrickville Girls' Intermediate High School was formally established and later renamed Marrickville Girls' Junior High School in 1954.

Plans for a new secondary school on Sydenham Road were approved in 1969, leading to the demolition of historic Victorian-era estates, including Llewellyn and Sydenham Villa (later renamed Standsure). In 1974, students from Marrickville Girls' Junior High School were transferred to the new campus.

On 7 October 1977, the Governor of New South Wales, Sir Arthur Roden Cutler, officially opened Marrickville Girls' High School.

=== Marrickville High School ===
In 1979, the school became co-educational to accommodate more students and alleviate overcrowding at Dulwich and Enmore High Schools, leading to its renaming as Marrickville High School.

The school initially enrolled 860 students and employed 64 staff members. Given the area’s high migrant population, extensive English as a Second Language (ESL) and remedial reading programs were introduced. Marrickville High School became fully co-educational by 1984.

In March 2001, the New South Wales Government proposed merging Marrickville High School with Dulwich High School on the Dulwich campus, effectively closing Marrickville High School. This decision sparked local opposition, leading to the "Save Our School" campaign. A community meeting attended by hundreds of people was held in the school hall. In May 2002, Education Minister John Watkins announced that both schools would remain open, citing the best interests of public education.

In 1990 the Support Unit was established to provide specialised education for students with special needs and intellectual disabilities.

In 1999 the Marrickville Intensive English Centre (MIEC) was established to provide secondary school aged, newly arrived migrants, refugees and International Students with English language skills so that they can access mainstream high school courses across Sydney.

In December 2024, Marrickville High School hosted Deputy Premier and Minister for Education and Early Learning, Prue Car, alongside local MP Jo Haylen, NSW Department of Education Secretary Murat Dizdar, and Director of Educational Leadership Chris Pevy-Buenen for a policy announcement on High Potential and Gifted Education (HPGE). The school was selected to receive $6 million in funding for facility upgrades.

== Principals ==
=== Marrickville Girls Junior High School ===
Name	Period
Alice Preston	1954–1955
Grace Simons	1956–1960
Phyllis Wylie	1961–1963
Esther Small	1964–1971
Valda Stephens	1972–cont.

=== Marrickville Girls' High School ===
Valda Stephens	cont.–1974
Kenneth Oliver	1975–cont.

=== Marrickville High School ===
Kenneth Oliver	cont.–1982
Ronald Ashe	1984
Kenneth Palmer	1984–1986
Andrew Powell	1987–1996
Sue Turner	1997–2000
Rick Symons	2001–2012
Arety Dassaklis	2013–2020
Bruno Sciacca	2021–2022
Steven Holz	2023–current

== Sports ==
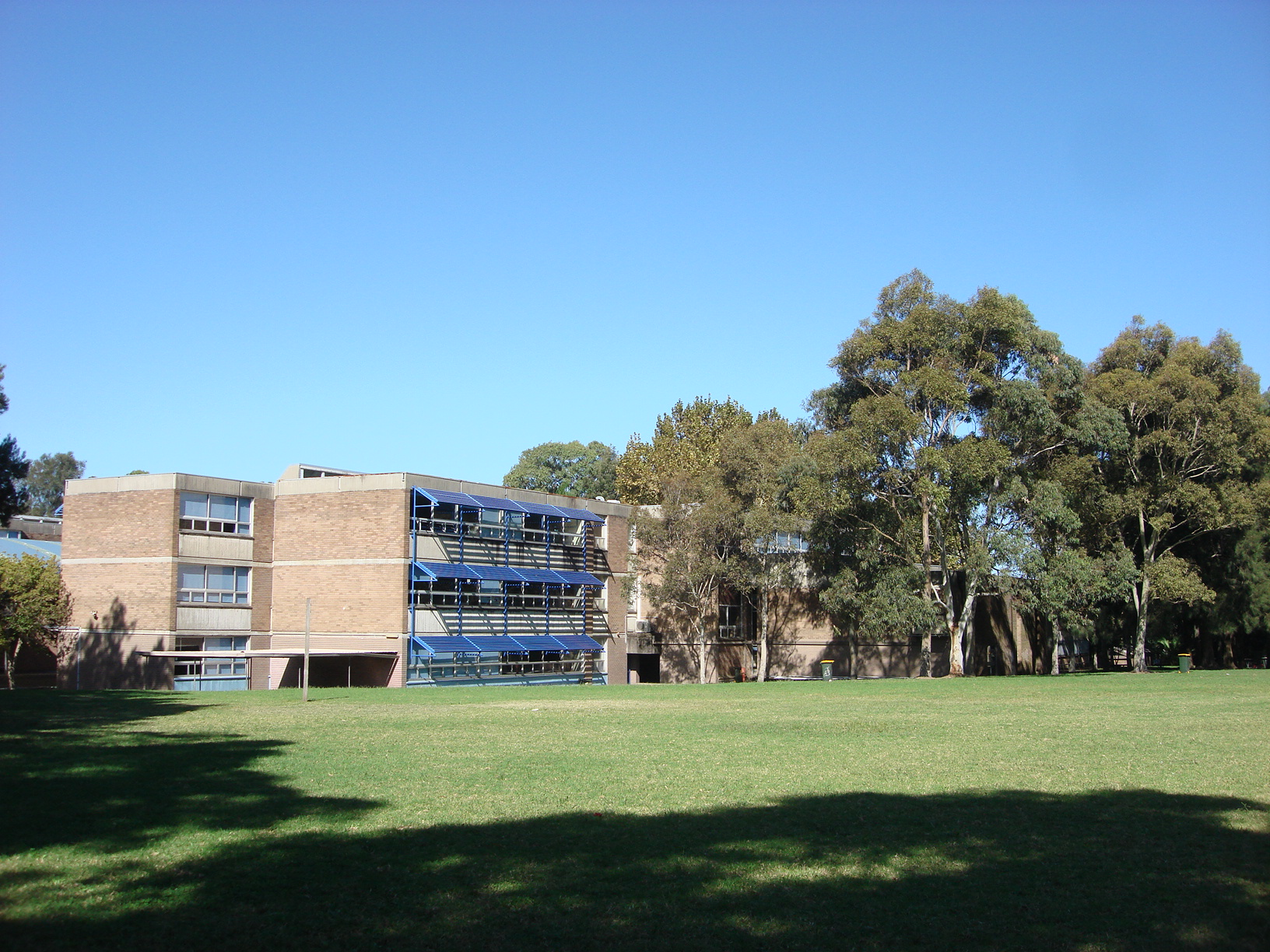
Marrickville High's Top Field

Sport plays an important role at Marrickville High and it has always been competitive and ambitious in sporting matches. Sports can be played on school grounds or out of school venues, in compulsory PDHPE lessons or as an extra-curricular activity.

Weekly Grade Sports (Years 7 and 8) offered include:

- Basketball
- Cricket
- Netball
- Oz-tag
- Soccer
- Softball
- Tennis
- Volleyball

Weekly Integrated Sports (Years 9 and 10) available include:

- Tennis
- Self-defence
- Swimming
- Ice-skating
- Ten pin bowling
- Hip-Hop dance
- Capioera (a Brazilian Martial Art).
- Rock climbing

Annual Sports Gala Days are held, where years 7 and 8 students from local high schools use the sporting grounds at Marrickville High to compete against one another in games of basketball.

The school competes in the Sydney East Knockout Competition, through which girls may compete in Touch, OZ Tag, Netball, Basketball, Soccer and Volleyball, and boys in Rugby League, Touch, Soccer, Netball, Basketball, Softball and Volleyball, Table Tennis and Indoor Soccer.

=== Sporting houses ===
Marrickville High has a house system used for sporting carnivals, students are organised into teams based on their roll call class. Originally the houses were simply named Gold, Red and Blue but they have been renamed using the surnames of Australian sports people:

- Freeman Cathy Freeman, athlete
- Perkins Kieren Perkins, swimmer
- Milton Michael Milton, Paralympian

Each year two sporting captains are chosen from the senior years to represent and lead their team. The school holds annual school carnivals in Swimming, Athletics and Cross-Country. Results from these Carnivals determine selection for school representative teams and students progress on to the Zone Carnival for further competition.

== See also ==
- List of Government schools in New South Wales
