= Newtown, New South Wales =

Newtown
- Suburb
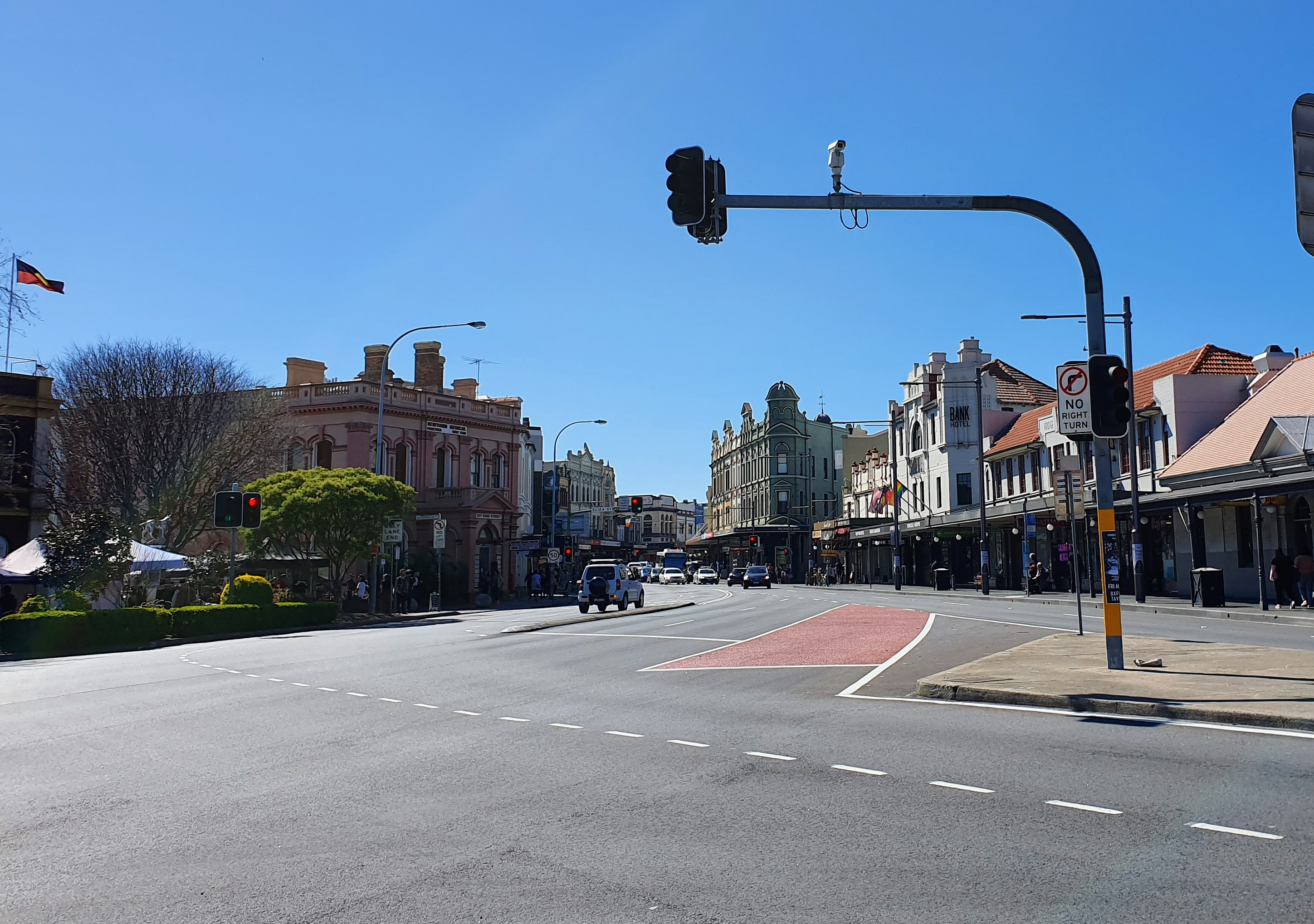
- Intersection of King Street & Enmore Road, Newtown

- Interactive map of Newtown
- Country: Australia
- State: New South Wales
- City: Sydney
- LGAs: City of Sydney; Inner West Council
- Location: 4 km (2.5 mi) south-west of Sydney central business district
- Established: 1812

Government
  - State electorate: Newtown
  - Federal divisions: Grayndler; Sydney

Area
  - Total: 1.59 km^{2} (0.61 sq mi)
- Elevation: 42 m (138 ft)

Population
  - Total: 14,690 (2021 census)
  - Density: 9,240/km^{2} (23,930/sq mi)
- Postcode: 2042
Suburbs around Newtown
Stanmore	Camperdown	Darlington
Enmore	Newtown	Erskineville
Marrickville	St Peters	Alexandria

Newtown, a suburb of Sydney's inner west, is located approximately four kilometres south-west of the Sydney central business district, straddling the local government areas of the City of Sydney and Inner West Council in the state of New South Wales, Australia.

King Street is the main street of Newtown and centre of commercial and entertainment activity. The street follows the spine of a long ridge that rises up near the University of Sydney and extends to the south, becoming the Princes Highway at its southern end.

Enmore Road branches off King Street towards the suburb of Enmore at Newtown Bridge, where the road passes over the Main Suburban railway line at Newtown railway station.

Enmore Road and King Street together comprise 9.1 kilometres of over 600 shopfronts. The main shopping strip of Newtown is the longest and most complete commercial precinct of the late Victorian and Federation period in Australia.

King Street is often referred to as "Eat Street" in the media due to the large number of cafés, pubs and restaurants of various cultures. Cafés, restaurants and galleries can also be found in the streets surrounding King Street.

== History ==
=== Aboriginal history ===
The area known as Newtown was part of a broader area where the Cadigal tribe of the Eora people lived, who ranged across the entire area from the southern shores of Sydney Harbour to Botany Bay in the south-east and Petersham in the Inner West.

The first indigenous Australian to receive a Christian burial was Tommy Mack James, an 11-year-old boy who died of bronchitis in the Sydney Infirmary. He was buried in Camperdown Cemetery, in a section now located outside the wall. The cemetery also contains a sandstone obelisk erected in 1944 by the Rangers League of NSW, in memory of Tommy and three other indigenous Australians buried there: Mogo, William Perry and Wandelina Cabrorigirel, although their graves are no longer identifiable. When the names were transcribed from the records onto the monument, there was an error in deciphering the flowing hand in which many of the original burial dockets were written. It is now known that the fourth name was not Wandelina Cabrorigirel, but Mandelina (Aboriginal).

King street, Newtown's main street, reputedly follows an Aboriginal track that branched out from the main western track, now beneath Broadway and Parramatta Road, and which continued all the way to the coastal plains around Botany Bay. This conflicts with other claims that the main western track was a barrier which divided the land.

=== 19th century ===
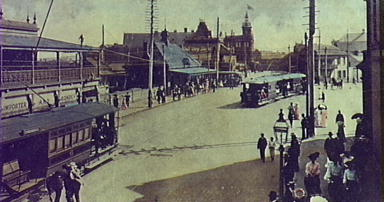
King Street and Newtown railway station from a coloured postcard. c.1906

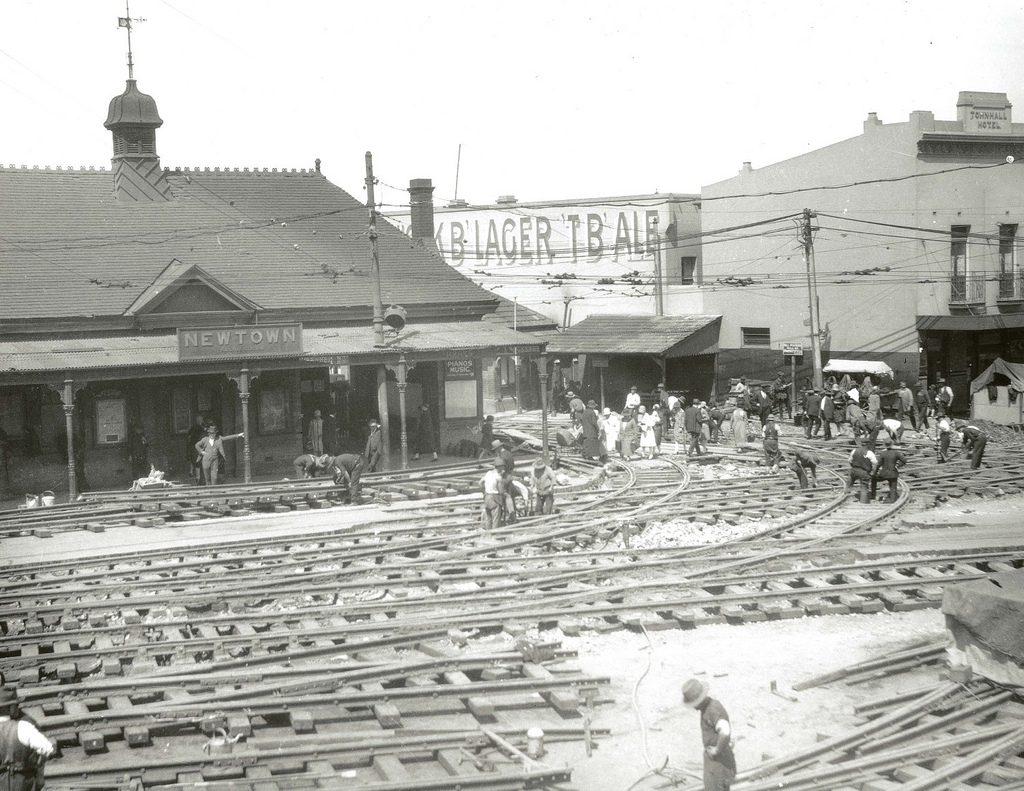
Relaying tram tracks in Newtown 1927

Newtown was established as a residential and farming area in the early 19th century. Nicholas Devine, the first principal superintendent of convicts called his property Burren Farm, after a region of County Clare in his native Ireland. Burren Farm would later become parts of Newtown and Macdonaldtown (now Erskineville).

Some histories say that the Newtown area took its name from a grocery store opened there by John and Margaret Webster in 1832, at a site close to where the Newtown railway station stands today. They placed a sign atop their store that read "New Town Stores". Captain Sylvester John Browne, father of Thomas Alexander Browne ("Rolf Boldrewood"), built "Newtown House" in the area around the same time, which has also been cited as the source of the name. The name New Town was adopted, at first unofficially, with the space disappearing to form the name Newtown. This account of the origins of the suburb's name has been disputed by other historians, given evidence that the names "Newtown" and "New Town" were in use some years before Webster opened his store.

The part of Newtown lying south of King Street was a portion of the two estates granted by Governor Arthur Phillip to the Superintendent of Convicts, Nicholas Devine, in 1794 and 1799. Parts of Macdonaldtown (now Erskineville) and Golden Grove were also once part of Devine's grant. In 1827, when Devine was aged about 90, this land was acquired from him by a convict, Bernard Rochford, who sold it to many of Sydney's wealthiest and most influential inhabitants, including the mayor. Devine's heir, John Devine, a coachbuilder of Birmingham, challenged the will, which was blatantly fraudulent. The "Newtown Ejectment Case" was eventually settled out of court by the payment to Devine of an unknown sum of money said to have been "considerable". The land was further divided into housing that is now evidenced by the rows of terrace houses and commercial and industrial premises.

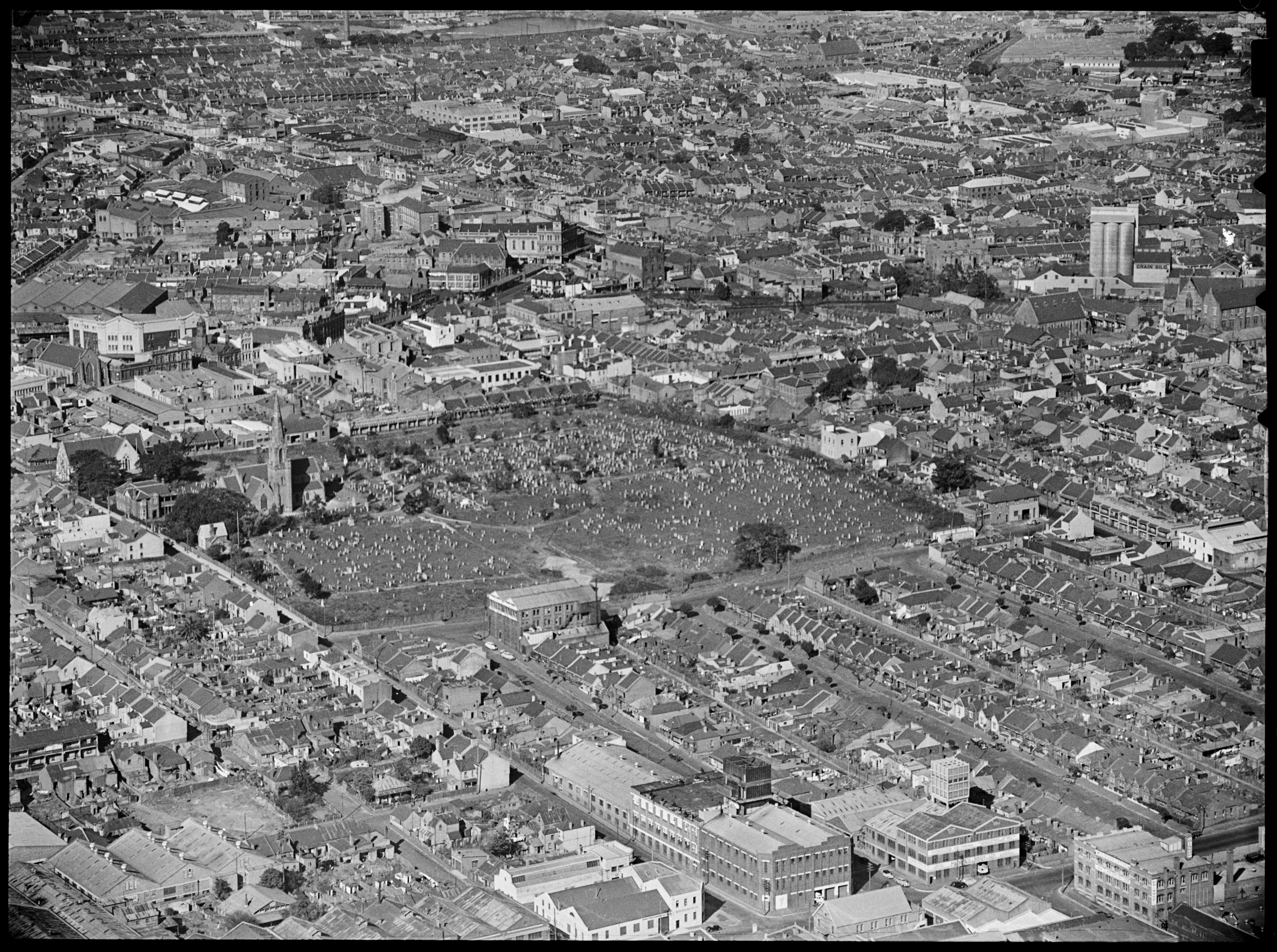
Aerial view over Camperdown Cemetery before resumption, July 1946

Part of the area now falling within the present boundaries of Newtown, north of King Street, was originally part of Camperdown. This area was named by Governor William Bligh, who received it as a land grant in 1806 and passed it to his daughter and son-in-law on his return to England in 1810. In 1848 part of this land was acquired by the Sydney Church of England Cemetery Company to create a general cemetery beyond the boundary of the City of Sydney. Camperdown Cemetery, one block away from King Street, was to become significant in the life of the suburb. Between its consecration in 1849 and its closure to further sales in 1868 it saw 15,000 burials of people from all over Sydney. Of that number, approximately half were paupers buried in unmarked and often communal graves, sometimes as many as 12 in a day during a measles epidemic. Camperdown Cemetery remains, though much reduced in size, as a rare example of mid-19th-century cemetery landscaping. It retains the Cemetery Lodge, a huge fig tree dating from 1848, as well as a number of oak trees of the same date. It survived to become the main green space of Newtown. Among the notable persons buried in the cemetery are explorer-surveyor Sir Thomas Livingstone Mitchell, Major Edmund Lockyer and Mary, Lady Jamison (widow of the colonial pioneer landowner, physician, constitutional reformer and "knight of the realm", Sir John Jamison), and Eliza Emily Donnithorne, recluse and rumoured inspiration for Miss Havisham. The cemetery also holds the remains of many of the victims of the wreck of the Dunbar in 1857.

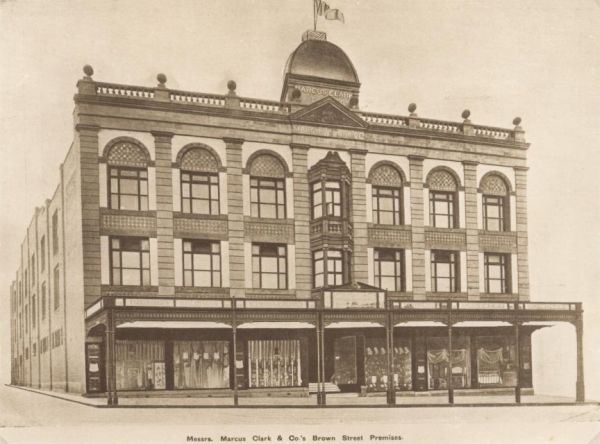
Marcus Clark, one of Australia's leading retailers was based in Newtown.

From 1845, when the first Anglican church was built on the site of the present Community Centre on Stephen Street, by Edmund Blacket, a number of churches were established, including St Joseph's Roman Catholic church in the 1850s, the Methodist church on King Street, now Newtown Mission, and the Baptist church in Church Street. The present St Stephen's Anglican church, a fine example of Victorian Gothic architecture, was designed, like its predecessor, by Blacket, and built in the grounds of the cemetery between 1871 and 1880. Both it and the cemetery are on the National Trust register of buildings of national significance. Its Mears and Stainbank carillon is unique in Australia, while its Walker and Sons organ of 1874 is regarded as one of the finest in New South Wales.

On 12 December 1862 the Municipality of Newtown was incorporated and divided into three wards: O'Connell, Kingston and Enmore, covering 480 acres (194.25 ha). In 1893 a plan was discussed to rename the council area "South Sydney" (as three municipalities North of Port Jackson (Sydney Harbour) had merged to form North Sydney three years earlier), but nothing came of it.

==== Housing ====
Although there are a few earlier buildings in Newtown, the most rapid development came in the late 19th century, with many former farms and other large properties being subdivided and developed as row-houses, known popularly as "terrace houses". With their predominance of Victorian-era houses with stuccoed facades, balconies of iron lace and moulded architectural ornaments, many Newtown streets are similar to those of other well-known inner-city suburbs like Glebe, Paddington and Balmain.

From about 1870 onwards, a large proportion of Newtown's residents lived in terrace houses of the cheapest possible construction. Many of these terraces were "two-up two-down", with rear kitchen, some having adjoining walls only one brick thick and a continuous shared roof space. Hundreds of these terrace houses still remain, generally 4 metres (13 ft) wide. It was not uncommon for speculative builders to build a row of these small houses terminating in a house of 1½ width at the corner of the street, this last being a commercial premises, or "corner store". During the Federation period, single-storey row houses became increasingly common.

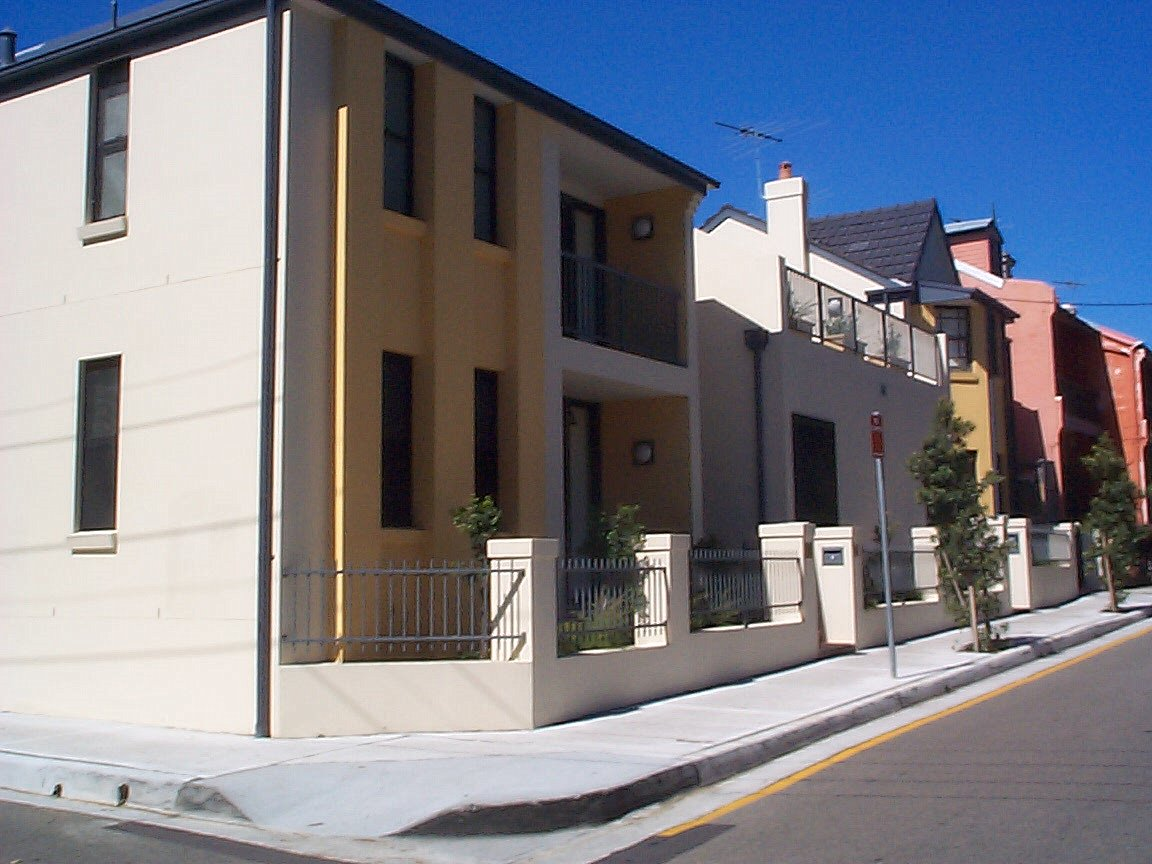
'Sympathetic' infill development

This preponderance of small houses is indicative of the working-class employment of most Newtown residents, many of whom worked in the city or at local shops, factories, warehouses, brickyards and at the nearby Eveleigh Railway Workshops. Retail and service trades dominated the suburb increasingly throughout this period, with tradesmen and shopkeepers together accounting for 70–75% of the working population. During the late 19th century and early 20th century, Newtown prospered, so much so that in the Jubilee Souvenir of the Municipality of Newtown, published in 1912, it was described as "one of the most wealthy suburbs around Sydney".

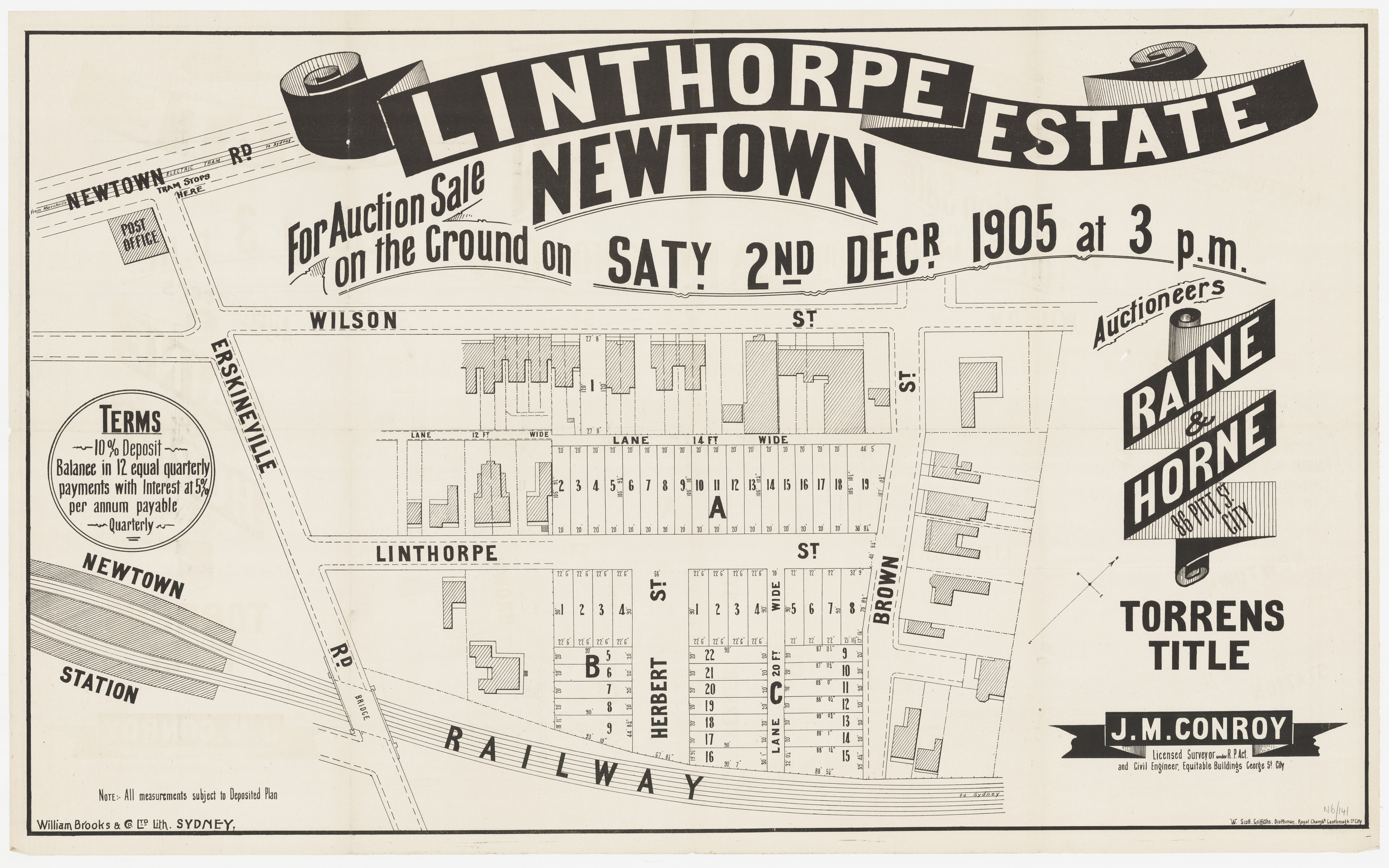
Linthorpe Estate, Newtown, Auction, 1905.

A number of imposing Victorian mansions were built on larger estates, as well as rows of larger and more stylish terrace houses in certain areas such as Georgina Street in North Newtown and Holmwood Street in South Newtown. As in many other historic areas of Sydney, some of the largest and most important houses, such as "Erskine Villa" (formerly on Erskineville Road, and which gave its name to the suburb of Erskineville), were demolished and the estates subdivided. Another loss was the home of Mary Reibey in Station Street, which was acquired by the Department of Housing in 1964, demolished in 1967, and replaced with an 8-story public housing tower block. Only the cottage of Reibey's dairyman survives, a little further down the street.

One of the most impressive surviving sets of 19th-century housing in Newtown is the imposing terrace of five elegant five-storey mansions running along Warren Ball Avenue in North Newtown, facing onto Hollis Park.

From the late 19th century onwards, the Newtown area became a major commercial and industrial centre. King Street developed into a thriving retail precinct and the area was soon dotted with factories, workshops, warehouses and commercial and retail premises of all kinds and sizes. Several major industries were established in the greater Newtown area from the late 19th century, including the Eveleigh Railway Workshops, the IXL jam and preserves factory in North Newtown/Darlington, the St Peters brickworks and the Fowler Potteries in Camperdown.

==== Public housing ====
Newtown is home to some public housing pockets built throughout the late 1960s to the 1970s, mainly consisting of unit complexes with walk-up apartments, extensive townhouses and tower blocks closely built together on small blocks of land, resided by the suburbs 1000 social housing tenants. These housing complexes dominate the housing stock on some of Newtown streets.

The large housing estates gradually shrunk as many of the homes were demolished and or reverted to private ownership as the surrounding area slowly went through gentrification.

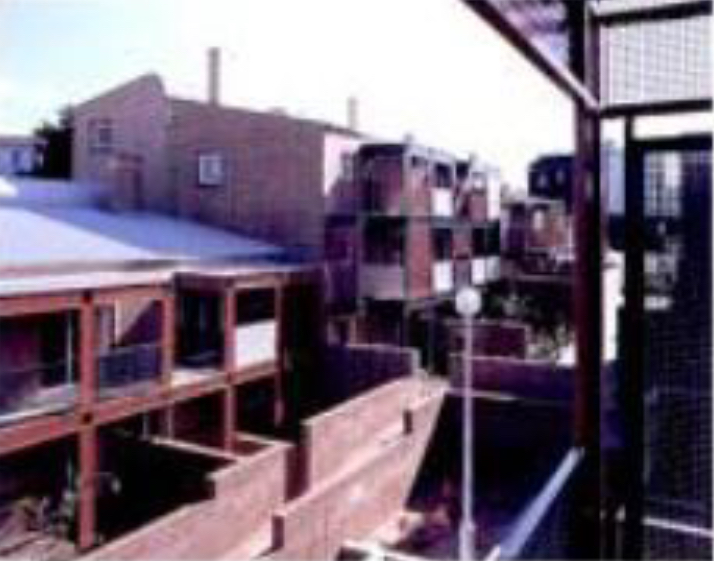
Golden Grove Housing Estate from Forbes Street (1999)

Most complexes were built with Radburn principles, with prefabricated walk-up flats and apartment blocks accessed by communal pathways and courtyards separated from roads, creating densely populated concentrations of disadvantage. The Radburn design has been widely criticised in outer-suburbs estates, allegedly contributing to some fire hazards and social problems with isolated areas giving local criminals a place to commit crime and evade motorised patrols.

Homes in these areas are owned by either the Department of Housing or the Aboriginal Housing Office. The complexes take up a significant amount of Newtown’s Indigenous Australian population.

The SA1 covering the Golden Grove housing estate according to the 2016 census, is the suburbs most economically/socially disadvantaged.

Department of Housing sites in Newtown:

8 Prefabricated terraces, 7 walk-up flats, 250–350 residents. Alice Street/Camden Street

9 Prefabricated walk-up flats, 75–120 residents. Alice Street/Hawken Street corner

13 Prefabricated walk-up flats, 1 6-story tower block, 300–500 residents. Forbes Street/Golden Grove Street/Darlington Road

1 9-story tower block, numerous Victorian terrace houses, 170–240 residents. Station Street/Reiby Lane corner

As well as numerous Victorian terrace houses and walk-up flat developments scattered around the suburbs streets.

=== Early 20th century ===
Although it prospered in the late 19th century, during the first half of the 20th century, and especially during the Depression, like many inner-city Sydney suburbs such as Glebe and Paddington, the area became increasingly run down as wealthy Sydneysiders preferred to settle in newer and more prestigious areas. In 1949, Newtown was incorporated into the City of Sydney.

=== Mid-20th century ===
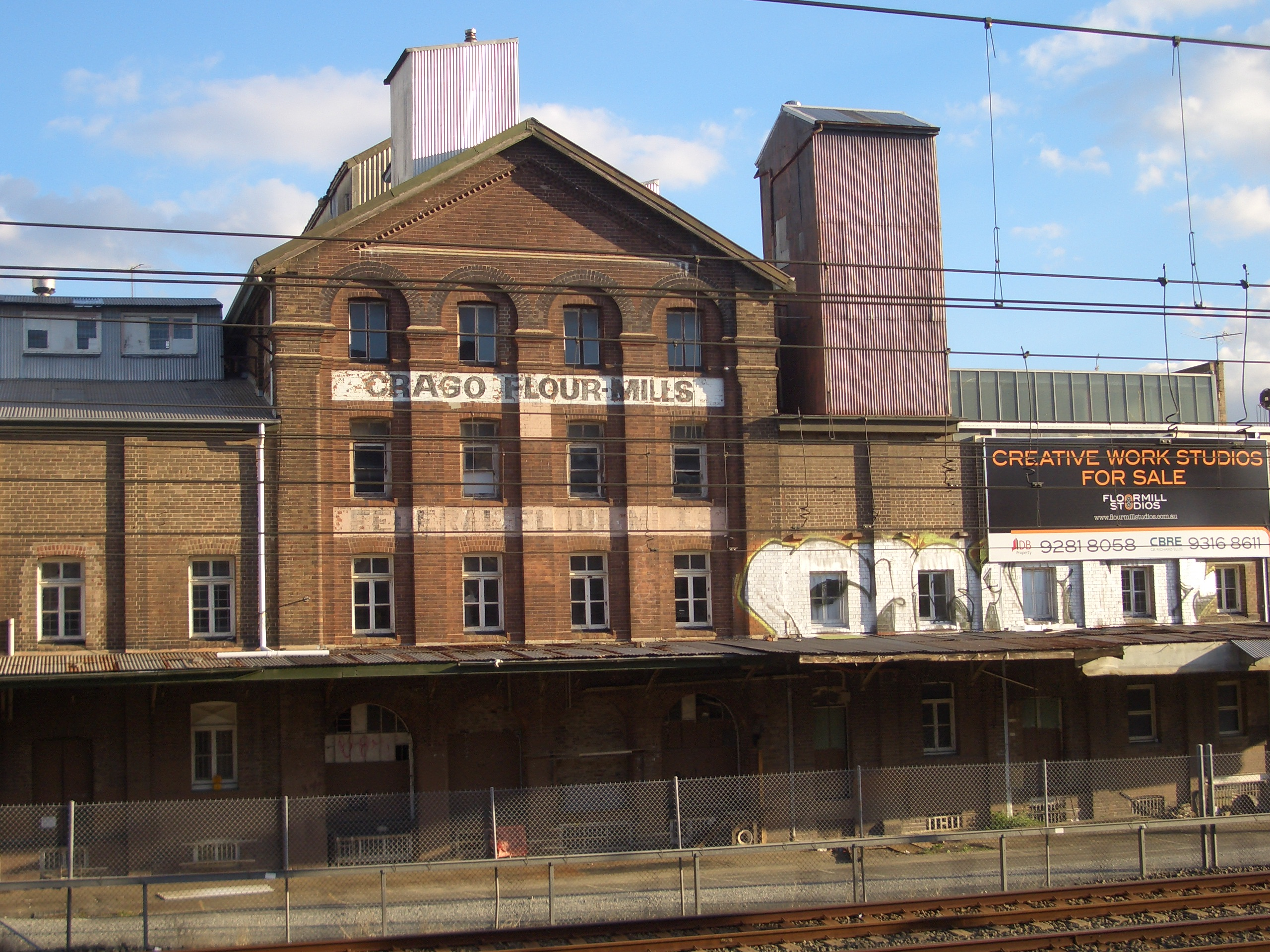
Crago Flour Mill

Newtown was originally a relatively prosperous suburb, the legacy of which is the numerous lavish Victorian mansions still standing in the area. However, many parts of Newtown had gradually become a working-class enclave, and for much of the 20th century, Newtown was a low-income blue-collar suburb, often denigrated as a slum. In the post-war period, the low rents and house prices attracted newly arrived European migrants, and Newtown's population changed radically, becoming home to a sizeable migrant community.

In 1968, a controversial redistribution of local government boundaries by the Askin state Liberal government saw part of Newtown become part of Marrickville Council. From the 1970s, as the post-war population prospered, raised families and aged, many moved to outlying suburbs to build larger houses, resulting in a supply of relatively cheap terrace houses and cottages entering the rental market. Because of its proximity to the expanding University of Sydney and the Sydney central business district, along with the comparatively low rents, Newtown began to attract university students in the 1960s and 1970s. The area became a centre for student share-households in Sydney and the development of cafés, pubs and restaurants made it a mecca for many young people. Newtown gained a reputation as a bohemian centre and the gay and lesbian population also increased.

=== Late 20th century and early 21st century ===
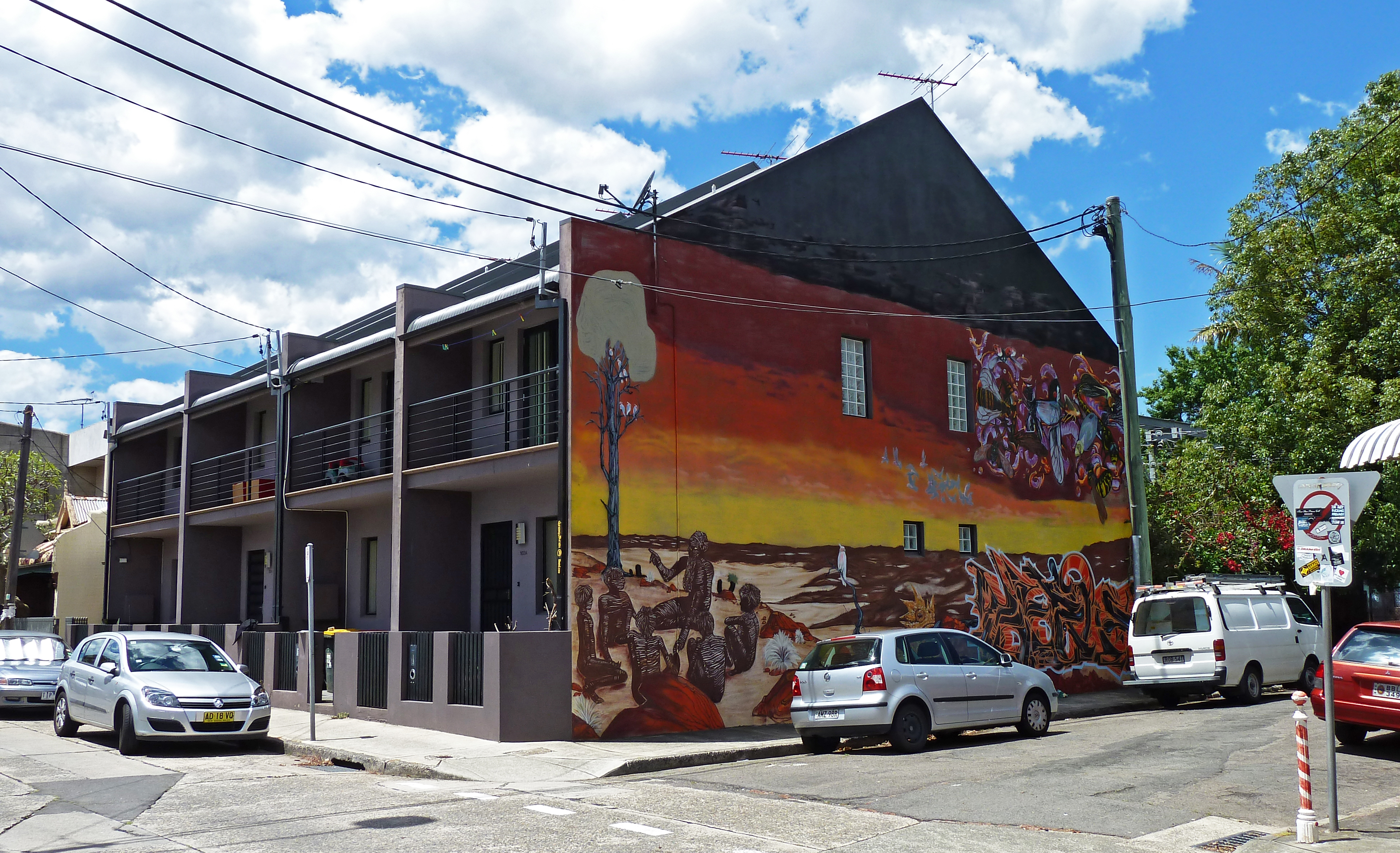
100–102 Lord Street, Newtown

The 1980s was the period that probably saw the greatest diversity in Newtown. At this time, cheap housing was still available. During the 1990s many long-established businesses closed, including Brennan's Department Store, a charming old-fashioned department store founded in the 19th century, and one of the last relics of the heyday of Victorian commerce in Newtown.

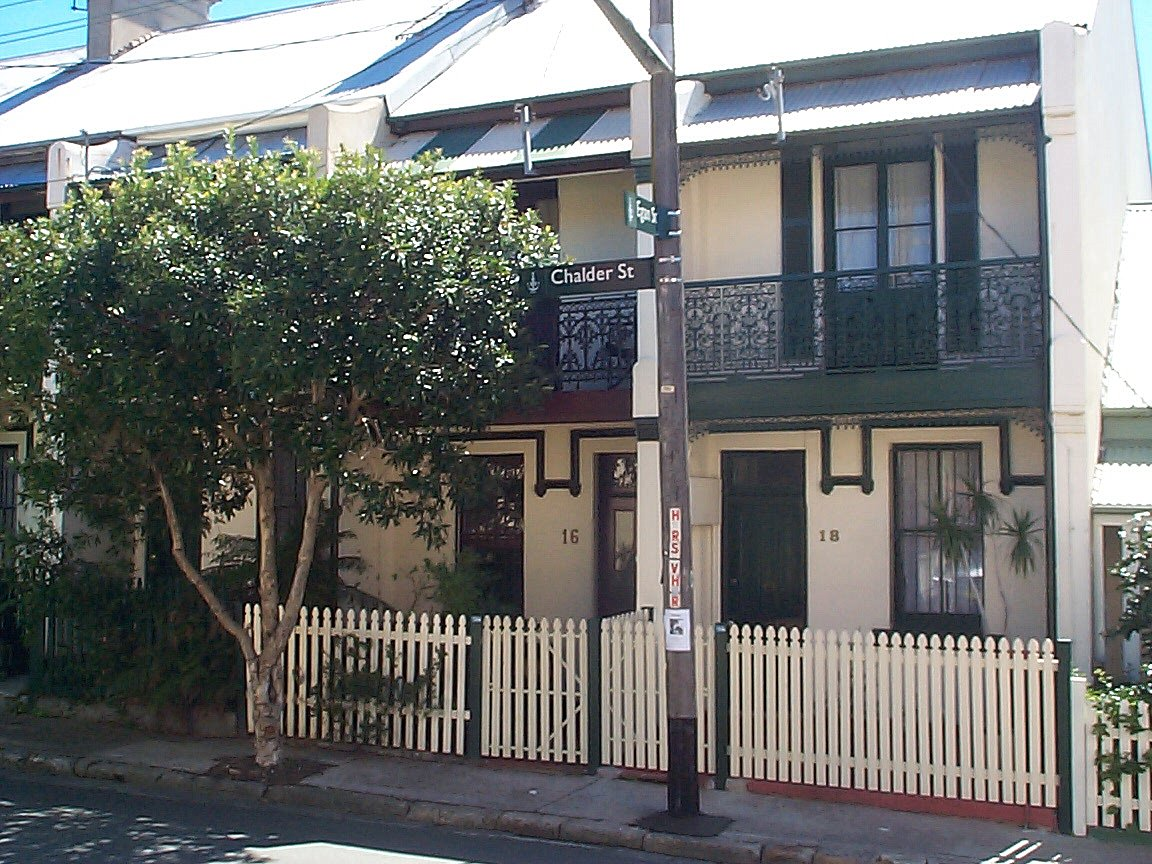
Typical Newtown Terrace

Many homes have been restored and remain examples of 19th-century architecture in Sydney. Like other similar inner-Sydney suburbs (most notably Paddington and Glebe), gentrification has led to another shift in Newtown's demographics. From the 1970s onwards, many major industrial and commercial sites in the area were closed or vacated. Many of these former commercial sites have since been redeveloped as housing such as the Alpha House and Beta House apartment complexes on King Street, which were formerly both multi-storey warehouses. Prior to becoming apartments, Alpha and Beta house became two artist warehouses that accommodated the birthing of many national and international performing arts companies and artists. One such company, "Legs on the Wall", was created in Beta House.

== Heritage listings ==
Newtown has a number of heritage-listed sites, including:

- 187–189 Church Street: St Stephen's Anglican Church
- 15 Carillon Avenue: The Women's College building
- Great Southern and Western railway: Newtown railway station and Newtown Tram Depot
- 69–77 King Street: Trocadero
- 280a King Street: Newtown Mission Uniting Church

== Transport ==
=== Rail ===
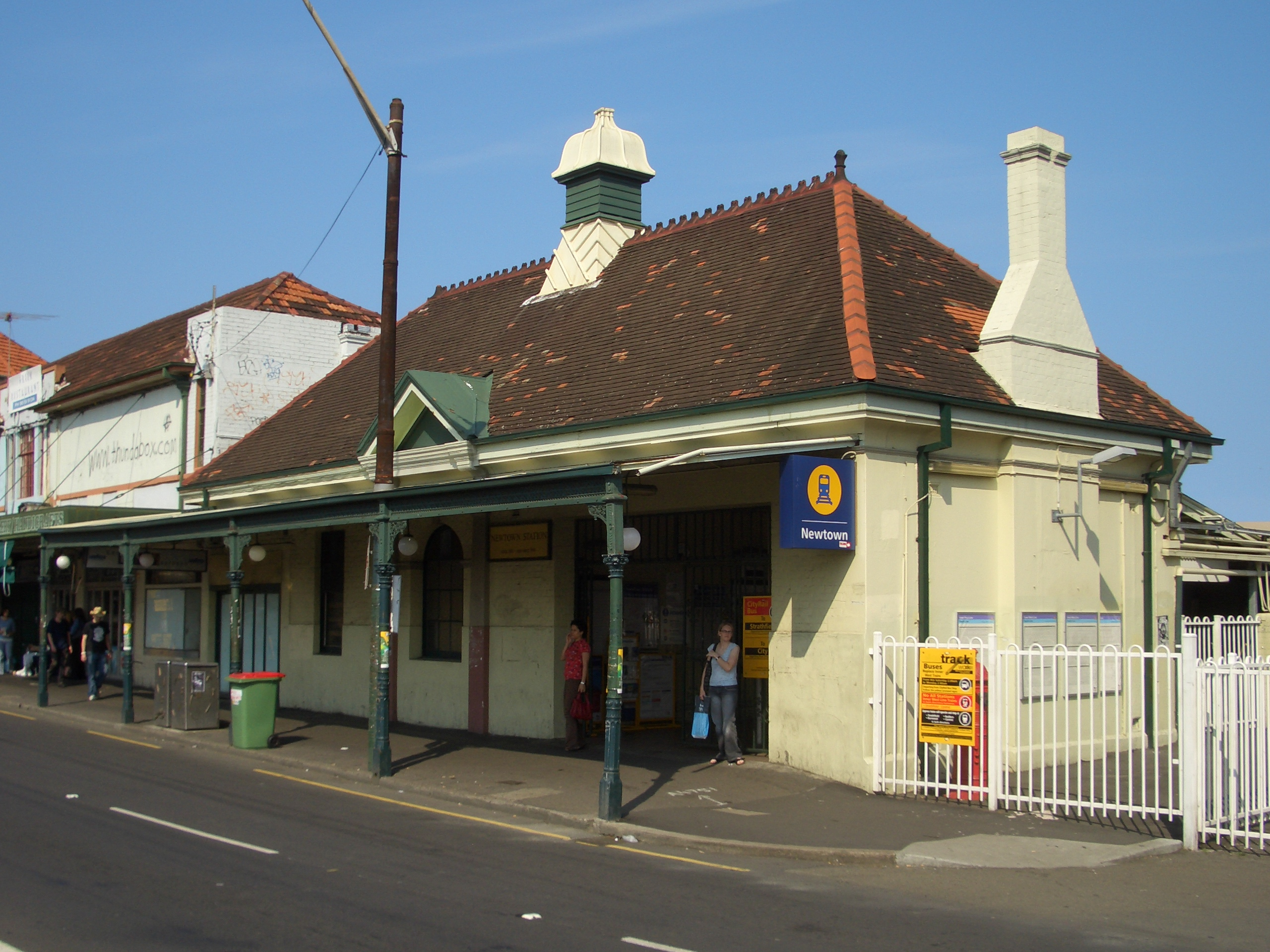
Former entrance to Newtown Railway Station

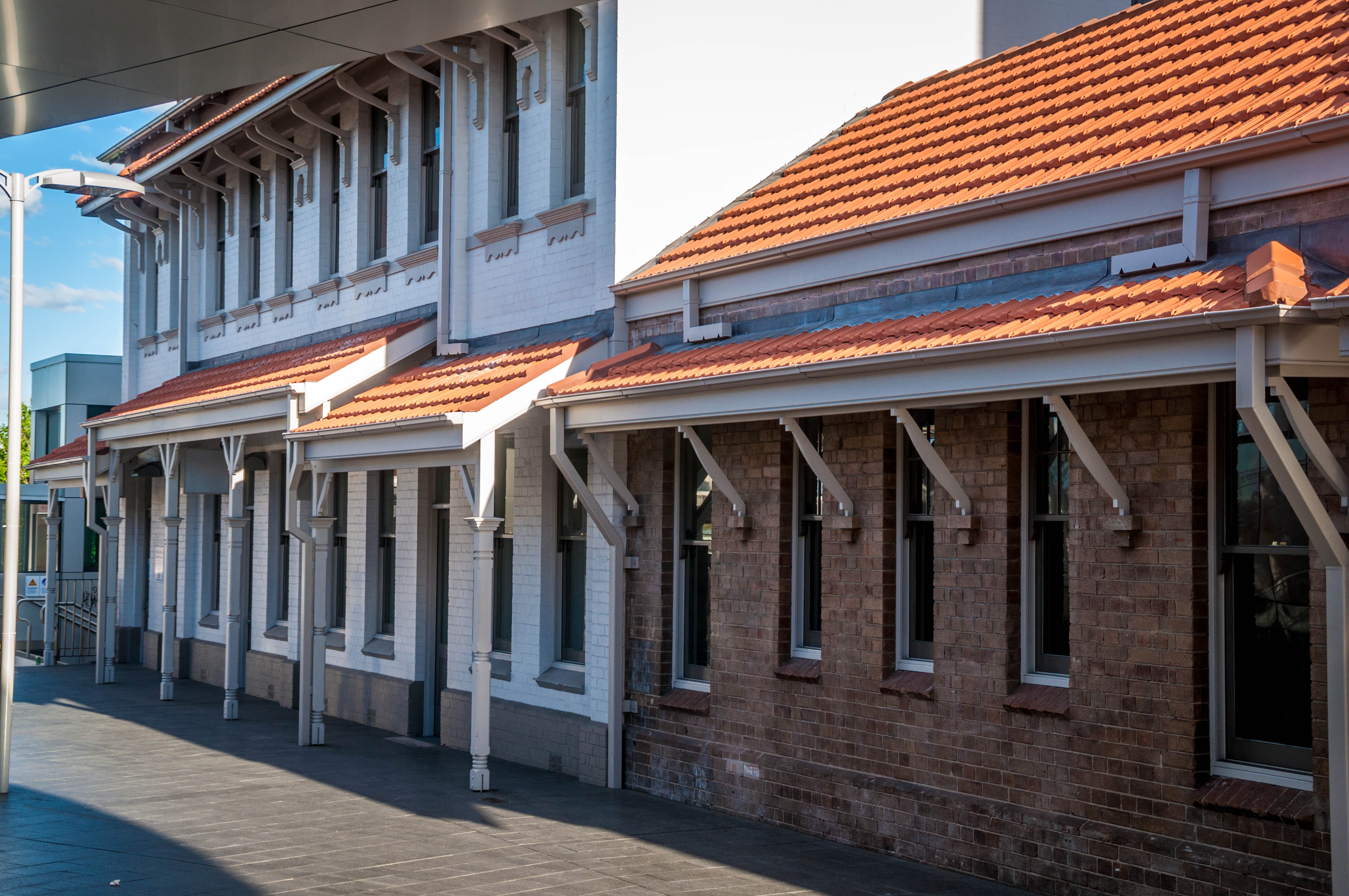
Former tramway office buildings

Newtown railway station is on the Leppington & Inner West Line and Liverpool & Inner West Line of the Sydney Trains network. The station opened in 1855, as one of the original four intermediate stations on the Sydney to Parramatta railway line (the others being Ashfield, Burwood and Homebush), and it was soon serviced by ten steam trains a day. In 1878 the station was moved from Station Street to its current location by the fork of King Street and Enmore Road.

Until the 1960s, when trams were phased out in Sydney, Newtown was a major hub for train-tram transfers; several regular electric tram services were centred there and the old Newtown Tram Depot (long vacant and now largely derelict) still stands next to the station. The long-abandoned former office buildings of the tram depot (adjacent to the current station entrance) were renovated during the renovation and rebuilding of Newtown Station and how house a café and restaurant. This extensive renovation, completed in 2012, greatly improved commuter access to the station platforms (which lie in a deep cutting under King Street) including additional stairways and a disabled-accessible elevator, although the renovation works and the layout of the new station entrance blocked the old tram-line entry way into the tram sheds, effectively cutting off direct vehicular access from King St into the tram sheds (which still lie vacant and derelict as of mid-2017).

=== Buses ===
Transdev John Holland and Transit Systems operate buses through Newtown. The trams were replaced by bus services that inherited the old route numbers – 422, 426, 428 – and follow the old tram routes that run along King Street and Enmore Road, going inwards to the city and outwards to Tempe, Dulwich Hill and Canterbury, respectively. Since then the 423 service from the city to Kingsgrove Bus Depot via Newtown has been added. There is also the 352 service that goes east through Surry Hills to Bondi Junction and the 370 service running north to the University of Sydney and Glebe Point and south-east to the University of New South Wales and Coogee.

== Education ==
In the 1990s, Newtown High School was chosen by the NSW Department of Education as the site for a new specialised performing arts high school, which would combine traditional academic subjects with music and theatrical performance education. The school was renamed Newtown High School of the Performing Arts. Prior to becoming Newtown High School, it was Newtown Junior Technical School (the "tech") that educated boys from 1st Year to 3rd Year at the end of which they gained the Intermediate Certificate unless they had already left school at the age of 15. Girls of the same age group were educated in the southern part of Newtown Public School. The primary public school was segregated with the boys part facing Newman St opposite the tannery works that often emitted obnoxious odours.' (From "Prior to...odours" it is based on personal knowledge through living in Newtown and attending those schools.)

Primary and infants school include:

- Australia Street Infants School
- Bridge Road School, Camperdown
- Camdenville Public School
- Newtown Public School
- North Newtown Public School
- St Joseph's College (defunct)

Private schools in the area include the Athena School.

The University of Sydney's Centre for Continuing Education provides adult education open to the general public.

== Landmarks ==
=== Pubs ===
In part because of its industrial and commercial history, the Newtown area contains many pubs. These include a number of late-Victorian establishments and several in an Art Deco style from the mid-20th century. In July 2000, one of these, "The Marlborough", called by historian Chrys Meader "the Gateway to Newtown" because of its visually commanding appearance at a wide intersection of King Street and Missenden Road, was stripped of all its original Art Deco tiles and had its upper floor substantially damaged before protests to the council prevented this being taken further.

=== The Trocadero ===
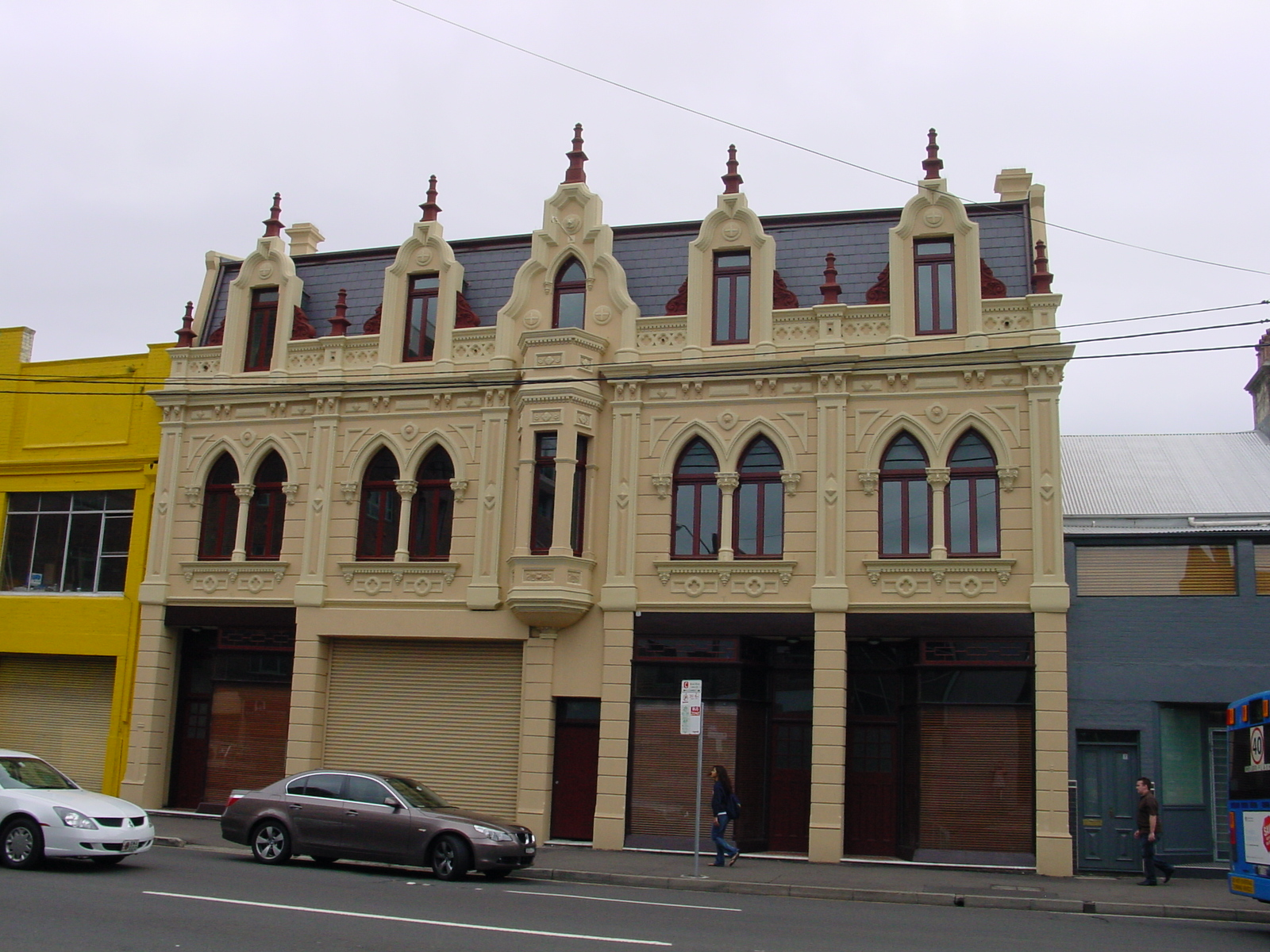
The Trocadero, restored in 2007

One of the major architectural conservation projects in Newtown has been the restoration of the Trocadero dance hall in King Street North. This large entertainment venue opened in 1889 and is one of the last 19th-century dance halls still standing in Sydney. Over the years it functioned variously as a dance hall, a skating rink, a cinema, a boxing and vaudeville venue, a bicycle factory and a motor body works.

From 1920 onward it was owned by the Grace Bros retail company, and several sections were leased out as shops or accommodation. For many years the shopfront on the northern side of the building housed Maurice's Lebanese Restaurant, commemorated in John Kennedy's "On King St, I'm A King". The building was purchased by Moore Theological College in 1974, and from 1981 to 1994 it housed the Con Dellis used furniture store, but all occupation ceased after that time. Fortunately, a sympathetic restoration program during 2005–06 by Moore College has returned this outstanding 19th-century building, including its elaborate Flemish-style facade, to its former glory.

=== Burland Hall ===
One Newtown landmark that has undergone many changes during the 20th century is the site of the former Burland Community Hall, on King St. In the early 20th century the site was occupied by the original Hub Theatre. From the mid-20th century it was occupied by an Art Deco-style cinema operated by the Hoyts cinema chain. In the mid-1960s the cinema was converted into a community hall and it was renamed Burland Community Hall in 1965. For years it was the venue for community events such as dances, concerts, film screenings, meetings, parties, wedding receptions and a community market. In 1986 its upper floor was taken over for the Newtown branch of the City of Sydney Library network, following the decision by Marrickville Council to close its Newtown library branch due to budgetary constraints. In 1995 the library moved to new premises in the former Salvation Army Citadel in nearby Brown Street, and Burland Hall was redeveloped into offices and retail premises.

=== Hub Theatre ===
One of the most notable local landmarks is the Hub Theatre opposite Newtown Station, next to the old Newtown Town Hall. The original Hub stood at, before moving to its present location, on the site of an earlier vaudeville theatre. It was converted to a cinema in the 1930. From the early 1970s, with the relaxation of Australia's censorship laws, it was used to screen pornographic films and stage live "adult" sex shows, including the long running "Little French Maid". The Hub closed as a "porno" venue in the early 1990s and has been mostly vacant ever since; the owners of the Dendy chain tried to secure the venue for its Newtown cinema but were unsuccessful. The Hub has been home to live comedy shows and other such performances, seeing a rejuvenation of the building.

== Culture ==
=== Live music ===
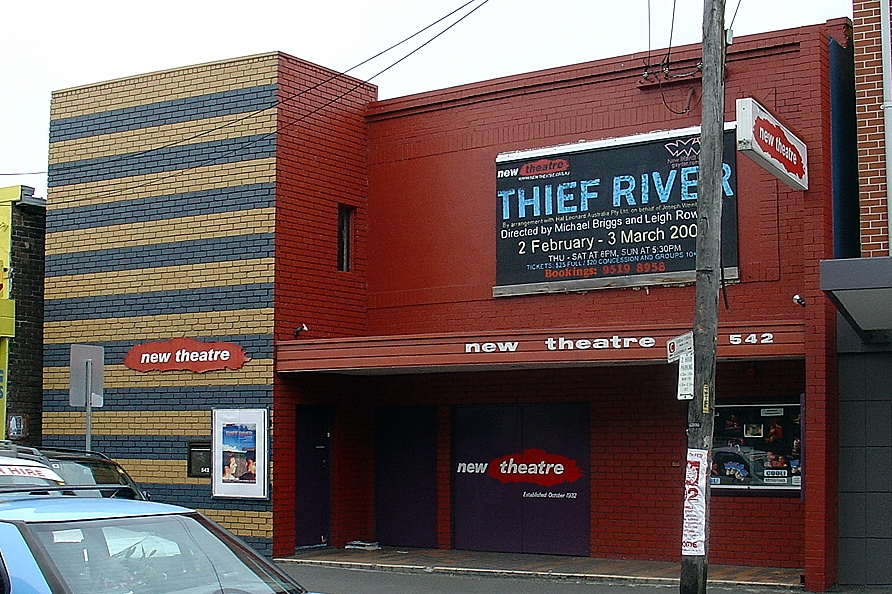
The New Theatre

Newtown has been a hub for live entertainment since the late 19th century. During the 1980s the many pubs in the area housed a thriving live music scene, notably the Sandringham in King Street. One of the best-known Australian bands to emerge from this scene was The Whitlams, who held down a formative residency at "The Sando" for several years. Musician John Kennedy wrote a tribute to the area in the mid-1980s. His single "King Street" name-checked familiar Newtown landmarks and local figures of the time, including "The Wire Man" (a local eccentric who collected wire and wire coat hangers), Maurice's Lebanese restaurant, and the Coles New World supermarket, which occupied the site of the current Dendy Cinema.

Throughout the 1990s it was particularly known as a centre for indie rock, with the suburb home to many musicians and several live venues. In the late nineties it boasted a handful of popular venues: Goldmans / Newtown RSL, The Globe, Feedback and The Sandringham, all of which had closed by the late 1990s. After its takeover by Petersham RSL Club, the former Newtown RSL reopened as a music venue under the name of @Newtown but closed in January 2011 due to financial losses.

Live music returned to the Sandringham Hotel in 2005, and in 2014 it reopened as the Newtown Social Club, hosting music in an upstairs performance space. However, in July 2017 the Newtown Social Club closed and the venue reopened as Holey Moley, a licensed 18-hole mini-golf course designed to give punters "good content for Instagram", according to its developers. Another recent addition to Newtown's live music scene is the small live venue Leadbelly (formerly The Vanguard) at the north end of King Street, and the continuing popularity of the lyric-sized Enmore Theatre.

=== Theatre ===
Newtown and its surrounding areas have the highest concentration of independent theatres and live performance spaces in Sydney. Theatres currently operating include:

- New Theatre, formed in 1932 and is Australia's oldest continuously performing theatre.
- Enmore Theatre on Enmore Road
- the Newtown High School of the Performing Arts

In the 1970s and 1980s many theatres, cinemas and music venues in the Sydney CBD were demolished. Due to the lack of "lyric"-sized venues, the Enmore Theatre in Enmore Road has become one of the busiest medium-sized concert venues in Sydney.

In the nineteenth and early twentieth centuries, Newtown was home to several popular theatres. Some of their buildings are still standing and some have been demolished. The Trocadero staged theatre and vaudeville in the early 20th century. The Hub, originally known as Clay’s Bridge Theatre, opened in 1913 and staged vaudeville acts and other performances. Other theatres from this era included Fullers' Majestic Theatre (from 1955 known as the Elizabethan Theatre) on the corner of Wilson Street and Erskineville Road, St George's Hall at 352 King Street, Manchester Unity Hall (previously Oddfellows Hall) at 12-14 Enmore Road, and the Enmore Theatre, built in 1908.

=== Festivals ===
Newtown hosts a number of annual festivals.

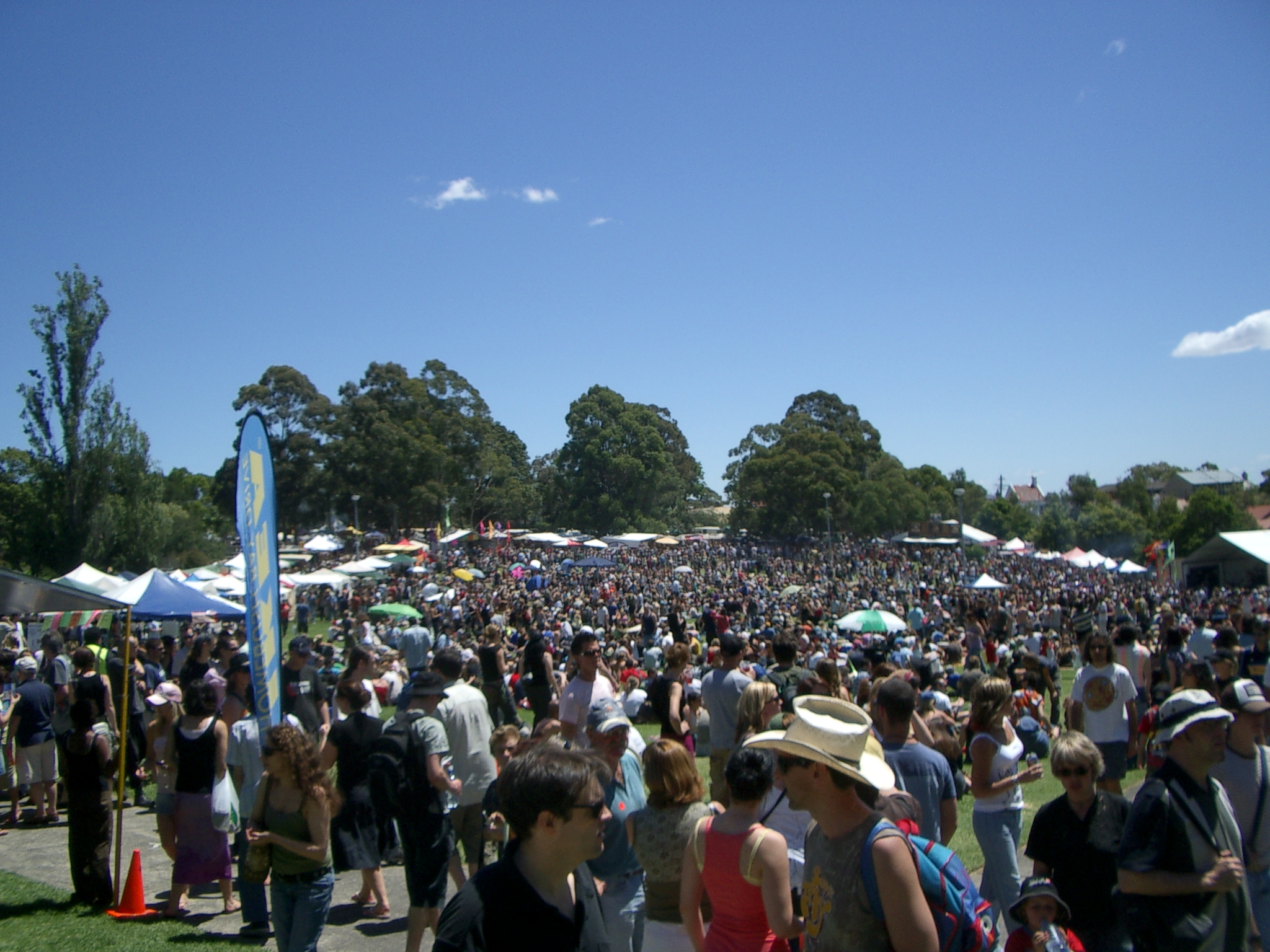
The Newtown Festival in 2004

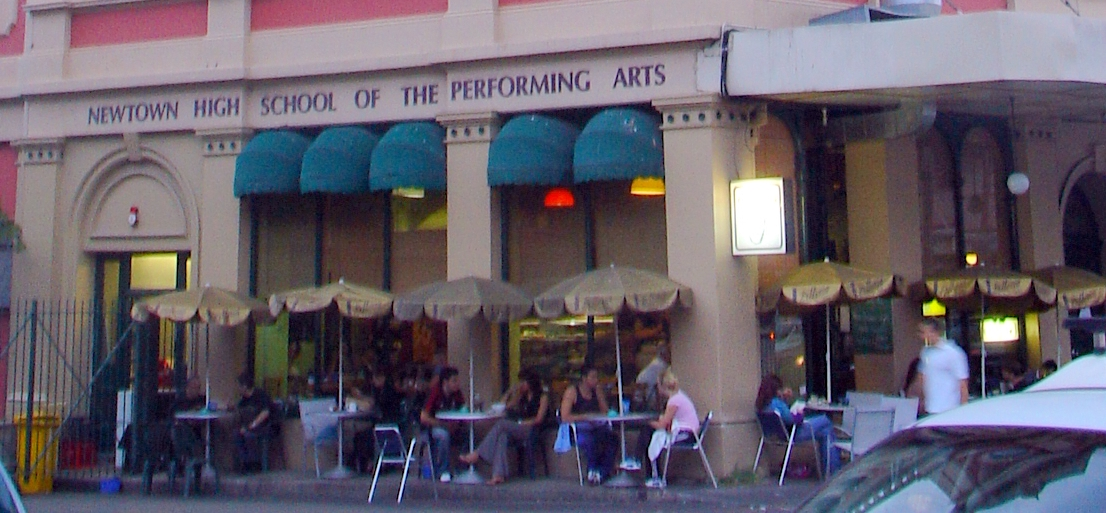
Corelli's Café housed under the Newtown Performing Arts School

The Newtown Festival was a community festival of free live music, events, workshops and stalls that was held annually from 1978 to 2019. Held in Camperdown Memorial Park next to St. Stephen's Church, Newtown. The purpose of the festival was to raise funds for the Newtown Neighbourhood Centre, an association that provides services to non-English speakers, the aged, disabled or poor.

Feastability, Newtown's Food and Wine Festival, showcases the eclectic international cuisines of the suburb along with Australian wine, local pubs and brewers, bakers and confectioners. The festival, which is held on the last Sunday of each September, started in the mid-1990s as six stalls outside the Hub. It now takes place in the grounds of Newtown School of Performing Arts, has more than 40 stalls and features all-day entertainment from musicians and artists, as well as kids' activities. The festival is organised by Marrickville Council.

Under the Blue Moon Festival was an alternative community festival also held in September. The event had a variety of entertainment; live music, discussions, street performances, fashion shows and other subculture presentations, especially those of the Goth community. Local business and special interest groups provided a diverse variety of entertainment, including a local alternative hairdresser and even the local mortuary with a display of coffins.

Sydney Fringe festival is a three-week alternative arts festival that was held for the first time in September 2010 at venues in Newtown, Enmore and Marrickville. It is a project of the Newtown Entertainment Precinct Association.

=== Sport ===
Newtown Rugby League Football Club—the "Newtown Jets"—is Australia's oldest existing rugby league club, formed in 1908 at the Newtown Town Hall. They compete in the NSW Cup competition, a tier below the NRL's national premiership, having left the top grade after the 1983 season. Their home ground is Henson Park, Marrickville.

=== Film and television ===
In the late 1960s, the Australian TV drama series You Can't See Round Corners starred Rowena Wallace and Ken Shorter as a draft dodger hiding out in Newtown. The TV series was based on Jon Cleary's novel of the same name, which is set in 1940s Paddington. When the decision was made to set the TV series in the 1960s, scriptwriter Richard Lane moved the action to Newtown because Paddington by the 1960s was considered too gentrified, while Newtown was still an "industrial suburb".

In the mid-1980s, the Spanish Mission-style service station on King Street was used as a location for scenes in the Ray Lawrence film Bliss, which was based on the novel by Peter Carey. In the film, the service station was used as the childhood home of Harry Joy's wife Bettina, played by Lynette Curran.

Erskineville Kings (1999), directed by Alan White and starring Hugh Jackman, features extensive use of locations in Newtown and Erskineville, including a scene shot in Gould's Book Arcade.

Garage Days (2002) directed by Alex Proyas, depicts a fictional indie rock band based in Newtown.

The ABC television drama Love Is a Four Letter Word, starring musician-actor Peter Fenton and featuring live bands each episode, included extensive location shooting at the Courthouse Hotel in Australia Street.

St Stephen's Church and Camperdown Cemetery have regularly been used as sites for filming movies, TV and videos, notably in Priscilla, Queen of the Desert.

The 2012 romantic comedy Not Suitable for Children, directed by Peter Templeman, was filmed in Newtown and surrounding suburbs.

In 2013, Sydney band Sticky Fingers filmed the music video for their song "Australia Street" on King Street.

In 2014, the British alternative rock band Coldplay featured the town in the music video for their single "A Sky Full Of Stars".

In 2026, in the Paramount TV series Dalliance, the character of Emma Brennan lives at the fictional address of 41 Elmridge Lane, Newtown. In episode five, the character of Jackson appears wearing a t-shirt from Clem's Chicken Shop, a takeaway shop that has traded on King Street since 1982.

=== Literature ===
==== People and institutions ====
Significant writers who live or lived in Newtown include Rolfe Boldrewood, Henry Lawson, Henry Kendall, Ethel Turner, Ruby Langford Ginib, Nadia Wheatley, Bertram Stevens, Martin Johnston, John Forbes, Fiona Place, Laurie Duggan, Steven Herrick, Minne Agnes Filson (aka Rickety Kate), David Malouf, Gig Ryan, David Marr, Fiona Wright, Jean Bedford and Peter Corris. The composer and writer Isaac Nathan, who collaborated with Lord Byron on his Hebrew Melodies, is buried at Camperdown cemetery.

The first municipal library in New South Wales was established in Newtown in 1868 in the Newtown School of Arts building at the corner of Australia and King Streets. Today, as well as the Newtown Library run by the City of Sydney, the suburb is home to The Women's Library, a feminist library established in 1992.

Newtown is home to many bookshops, including Gould's Book Arcade (founded in 1967 by activist Bob Gould), Better Read than Dead, Elizabeth's Bookshop, Modern Times and Parliament on King. Anarchist bookshop Black Rose Books, established in 1982, has occupied several sites in Newtown including its current location on Enmore Road.

Many publishing houses have been active in Newtown over the years. Walker Books, Vagabond Press, Darlington Press and Sydney University Press are currently based in the Newtown area; Newtown publishers of the past include Neptune Press, Camperdown Press, Millennium Books and Leftbank Publishing. The Newtown Review of Books, a literary journal established in 2012 by Jean Bedford and Linda Funnell, has published essays about the suburb by the crime writer Peter Corris.

==== Newtown in fiction ====
One of the first pieces of fiction to be published in colonial Sydney was "The Legend of Newtown" by future member of parliament D.H. Deneihy, published in the Sydney Sentinel on 5 November 1845 when the author was 17. It described Newtown as "a favourite place ... to snatch a mouthful of fresh air, a view of the ruralities of the place".

The famous Newtown recluse and eccentric Eliza Emily Donnithorne (1826–1886) is said by some sources to have inspired the character of Miss Havisham in Charles Dickens' novel Great Expectations. Donnithorne lived in Cambridge House (later known as Camperdown Lodge and since demolished) at 36 King Street, Newtown from about 1836 until her death in 1886. She is buried at Camperdown cemetery.

Dorothy Hewett's 1959 novel Bobbin' Up includes a description of the dance halls and night life of King Street in the 1950s. The House that Was Eureka by Nadia Wheatley (1985) is set in a row of Newtown terrace houses in 1931 and 1981, both periods of economic downturn and high unemployment in the suburb.

More recently, Sandra Leigh Price's 2015 novel The Bird's Child is set in bohemian Newtown in 1929. Dark Fires Shall Burn, a 2016 crime novel by Anna Westbrook, is set in Newtown in 1946. The verse novel Newtown Voices by Sue Cartledge (2017) describes Newtown in 1978. The Blank Page by John Dale (1987) features a cameo by the Marlborough Hotel on King Street. The protagonist of The Morbids by Ewa Ramsey (2020) lives above a bookshop on King Street.

==== Newtown in poetry ====
Poems about Newtown include "Laminex" by John Tranter, "Newtown Pastoral" by Gig Ryan, "On the Road" by S.K. Kelen, "Thread Drift" by Pam Brown, "Greek Cheeses" and "To a Runner Dressed in Black" by Adam Aiken, "King Street Newtown" by Alison Clark, "Autumn in Newtown" by Christopher Kelen, the 1994 collection Wildlife in Newtown by Colleen Burke, "Love Poem for Newtown, Sydney" by Devon Webb, "God Drinks at the Sandringham" by Justin Lowe, "The Sleeping City: Australia Street" by Helen Loughlin and "An Ordinary Evening in Newtown" by Laurie Duggan.

==== Newtown in children's literature ====
Children's literature set in Newtown includes My Place and Five Times Dizzy and Dancing in the Anzac Deli by Nadia Wheatley and Lara of Newtown by Chris McKimmie.

=== Graffiti and street art ===
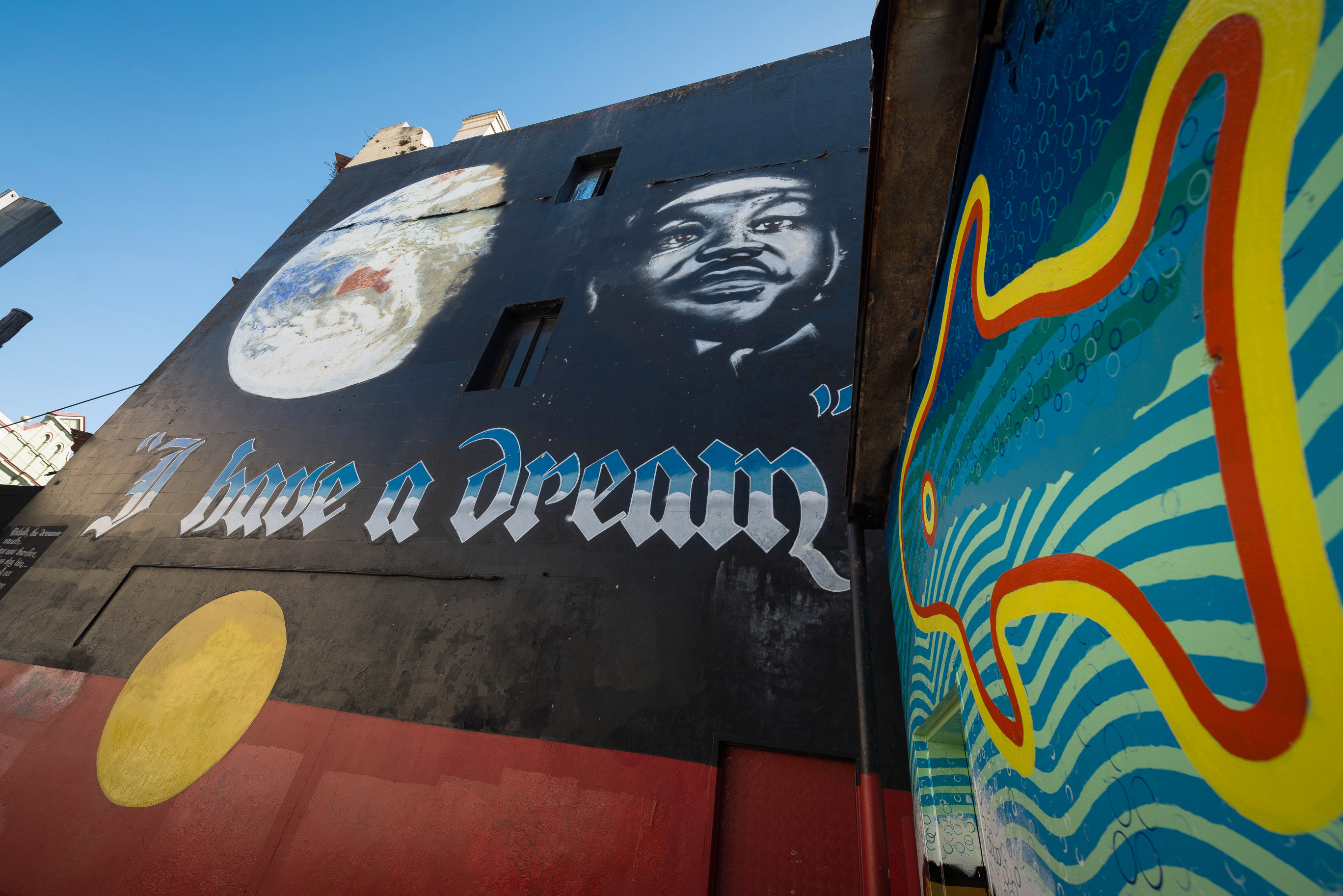
Martin Luther King mural on King St

The Newtown area is also known for its creative graffiti and "street art". The most prominent of these works are the large murals created in the late 1980s and early 1990s, which were painted on the walls of houses and shops in the area. Spray-painted "tags" have proliferated all over the area in recent years, although more recently the style of tagging has become far more elaborate than the simple spray-can signatures that litter walls throughout the district.

Examples include a mural of American civil rights leader Martin Luther King Jr. on King Street (painted by Andrew Aiken (Seems) and Juilee Pryor), the "Great Wave" mural in Gowrie Street, the "Three Proud People" mural (a reproduction of a photo taken at the 1968 Mexico City Olympics), and the "map of Africa" mural in King Street.

Since 2014, the Inner West Council (and its predecessor, Marrickville Council) have managed the "Perfect Match" initiative, which pairs artists with residents and business owners to create large-scale paintings in public spaces. As of 2024, over 160 artworks have been produced through the initiative, including in Newtown.

=== Gay and lesbian culture ===
According to the 2011 census, Newtown, St Peters and Erskineville had the highest proportions of same-sex couples. The gay and lesbian community of Newtown also extends into neighbouring Glebe, Leichhardt, Annandale, Marrickville, Enmore and Dulwich Hill. The area was home to two of Sydney’s most well-established gay and lesbian pubs, the Newtown Hotel on King Street and the nearby Imperial Hotel in Erskineville Road (the famous drag show pub featured in the movie Priscilla, Queen of the Desert). The owners of the Newtown Hotel abruptly terminated negotiations for lease renewal and locked the licence-owner out of the premises in November 2007. The bar reopened in late 2010, under the name 'Freaky Tiki'. After renovations in 2010, it has reopened and reclaimed its original name, The Newtown Hotel, and currently offers a general, non-specific clientele, in common with most bars in the area. The Imperial also closed in 2007 for renovations but did not reopen until 2010, following a protracted and expensive licensing battle with the local council. As of 2019, The Imperial hosts queer parties on Thursday nights.

One bar formerly known as Zanzibar had a loyal lesbian following but it rebranded as Websters Bar, with a general clientele in 2016. Wednesday nights are especially popular for lesbians as the upstairs bar at The Bank Hotel hosts nights for queer women.

Since 2018, rapid gentrification of the area and Sydney's introduction of the CBD lockout laws, which Newtown is excluded from, has seen much of the LGBTQ+ scene pushed into neighbouring areas. Also as a result, homophobic violence has risen in the area.

The Gay and Lesbian Counselling Service in Newtown provides free telephone counselling for gays and lesbians living in NSW, as well as Twenty 10, a support organisation for young gay, lesbian, bisexual, transgender, same-sex attracted and gender-questioning people who are under 26 and having problems at home or have recently become homeless.

== Population ==
Historical population
Year	Pop.	±%
2001	12,457	—
2006	13,550	+8.8%
2011	14,148	+4.4%
2016	15,029	+6.2%
2021	14,690	−2.3%

=== Demographics ===
At the 2021 census there were 14,690 people in Newtown.

The region boasts a relatively younger population with a median age of 33, considerably lower than the national median of 38.5. Education attainment levels in Newtown are high, with 41.1% of its residents holding a bachelor's degree or higher.

Newtown also stands out for its high level of cultural diversity. About 28.2% of Newtown residents speak a language other than English at home, reflecting the multicultural character of this inner-city suburb.

As per 2021 Census, the majority of Newtown residents were born in Australia (64.5%). Other countries of birth for residents include England (5.7%), New Zealand (2.7%), China (1.5%) and the USA (1.4%). Smaller but significant groups from diverse ethnic backgrounds further contribute to the multicultural character of Newtown, marking the suburb as a microcosm of global cultures within Sydney's vibrant urban landscape.

The residents of Newtown enjoy an above-average lifestyle, with a median weekly household income of $2,024, significantly higher than the national median. The suburb continues to attract a mix of students, professionals, artists, and independent thinkers, making it one of Sydney's most dynamic and unique suburbs.

=== Notable residents ===
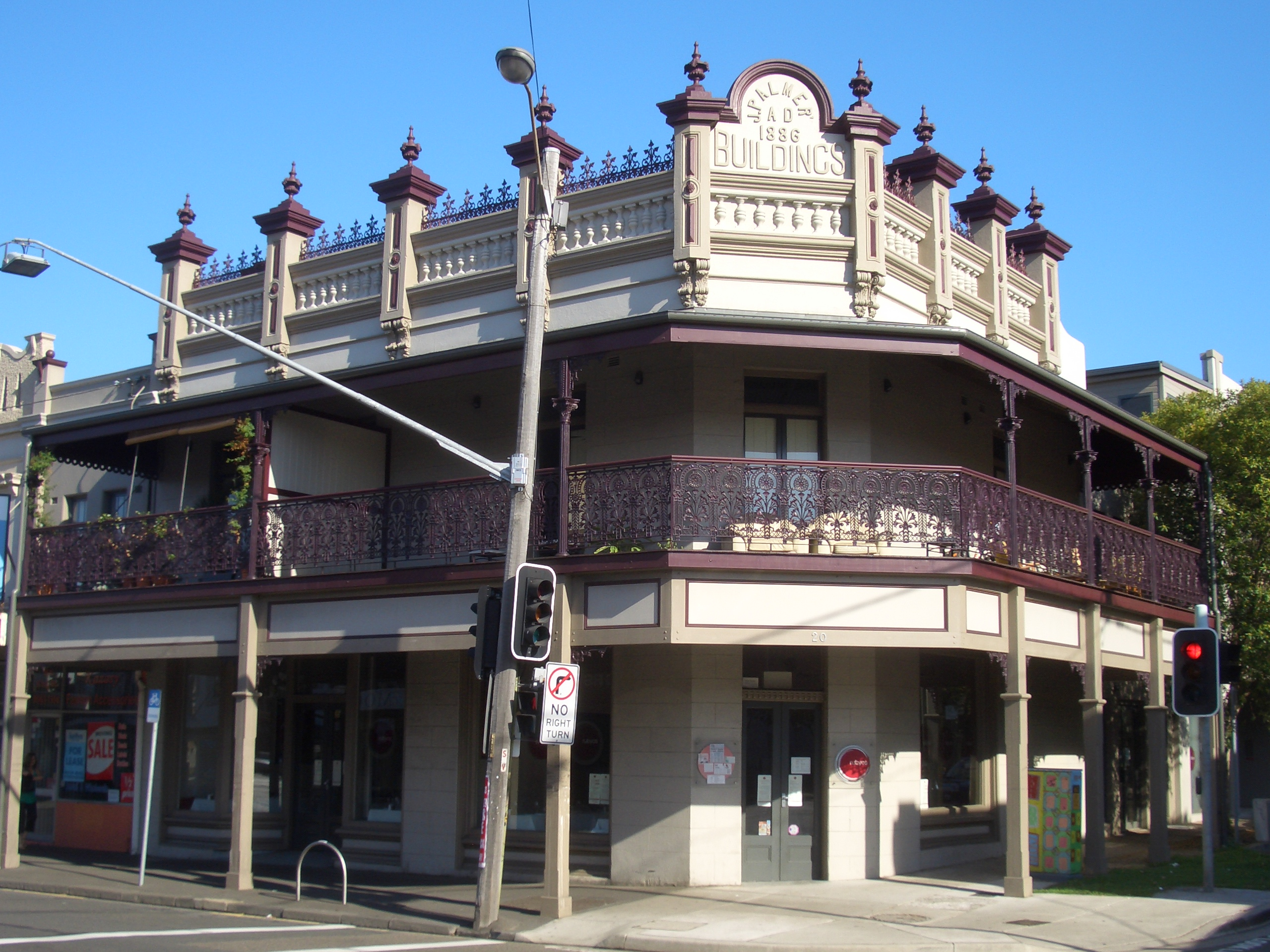
King Street shops – the Palmer Buildings on King St north, featuring the recently restored verandah

- Angelspit, industrial music duo
- Christine Anu (b. 1970), pop singer
- Charles Badham (1813–1884), classical scholar
- Sarah Blasko, musician
- Sticky Fingers – Reggae fusion/indie rock
- Rolf Boldrewood (1826–1915), born Thomas Browne, author of seventeen novels including the classic Robbery Under Arms
- Doc Brown, comedian and former rapper
- Mark Bugden (b. 1961), rugby league player
- Arthur Capell (1906–1982), linguist & anthropologist
- Murray Cook (b. 1960), member of Australian children's group The Wiggles
- Eliza Emily Donnithorne (c.1826–1886), recluse and rumored model for Miss Havisham
- John Villiers Farrow (1904–1963), Academy Award-winning Australian film director and father of actresses Mia Farrow and Prudence Farrow
- Francis Forbes (1784–1841), first Chief Justice of the NSW Supreme Court
- Lilian Fowler (1886–1954), Labor politician, Australia's first female Mayor
- Frenzal Rhomb, band originating in Newtown
- Nicholas Harding, former winner of the Archibald Prize for portraiture
- Terry Hill (1972–2024), rugby league player
- Ignatius Jones, entertainer and former lead singer of 80s rock band Jimmy And The Boys
- Henry Kendall (1831–1882), poet
- Ruby Langford Ginibi (1934–2011), Bundjalung author and Koori activist
- Henry Lawson (1867–1922), writer
- Genevieve Lemon, actress and singer
- Paul Mac, DJ and music producer
- Enda Markey, theatre producer
- Anthony Mundine (b. 1975), rugby league player and boxer
- Dawn O'Donnell (1928–2007), prominent business and nightclub owner, gay and lesbian rights campaigner
- Mary Reibey (1777–1855), pioneering entrepreneur who is portrayed on the Australian twenty-dollar note
- Saul Samuel (1820–1900), merchant and politician
- Adam Spencer, mathematician, science broadcaster and radio and TV personality
- Bertram Stevens (1872–1922), literary critic, art critic, editor
- Clarrie Stevenson (1910−1984), rugby league player
- Monica Trapaga (b. 1965), former children's presenter and jazz singer
- Nadia Wheatley, writer
- The Whitlams, pop band
- Charles Windeyer (1780–1855), magistrate & legal pioneer, inaugural Lord Mayor of Sydney
- Harold Wyndham (1903–1988), educationalist
- Youth Group, indie rock band mostly known for their hit remake of "Forever Young"

== Governance ==
=== Local ===
Newtown is divided between Inner West Council and City of Sydney local government areas.

=== State ===
Newtown was predominantly in the state electoral district of Marrickville, which was represented by the former deputy Premier Andrew Refshauge until his resignation on 10 August 2005. The resulting by-election, held on 17 September 2005 was won by Carmel Tebbutt. Prior to the 2015 NSW State Election, the electoral district of Newtown was recreated, which had previously existed but was abolished after the 1950 election. The majority of Newtown now resides in this district. The seat is currently held by Jenny Leong of the Greens.

=== Federal ===
Federally, Newtown lies partly in the electorate of Grayndler, represented by Anthony Albanese of the ALP, and partly in the electorate of Sydney, represented by Tanya Plibersek, also of the ALP.

Both electorates saw strong Green votes in the 2001 election, and it was expected the Green candidates, rather than the Liberal Party, would provide the main opposition to the ALP in the 2004 election, although the Liberals ultimately did narrowly retain their lead over the Greens in these electorates.

== Gallery ==
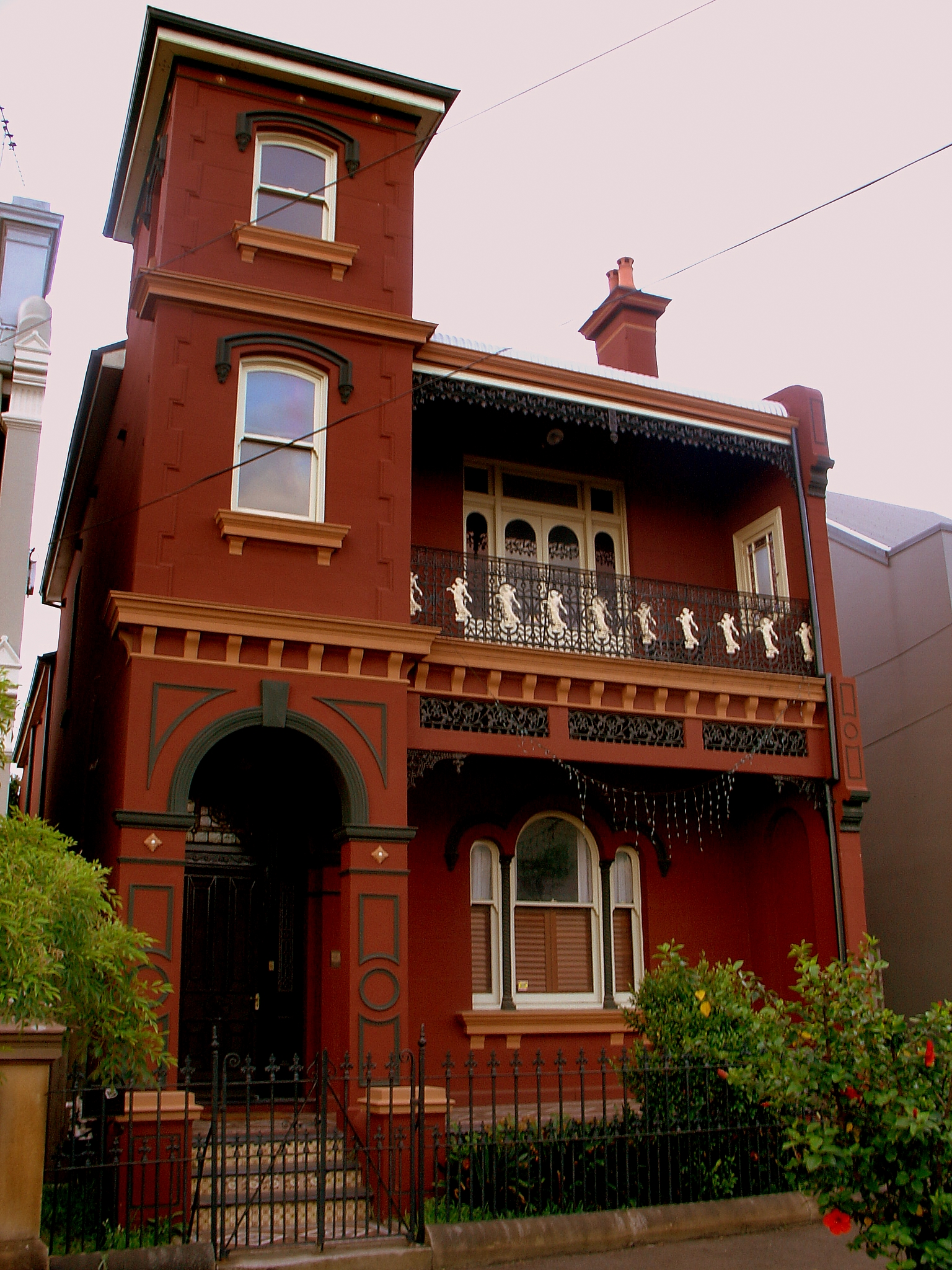
Restored grand 19th Century house, Dickson Street

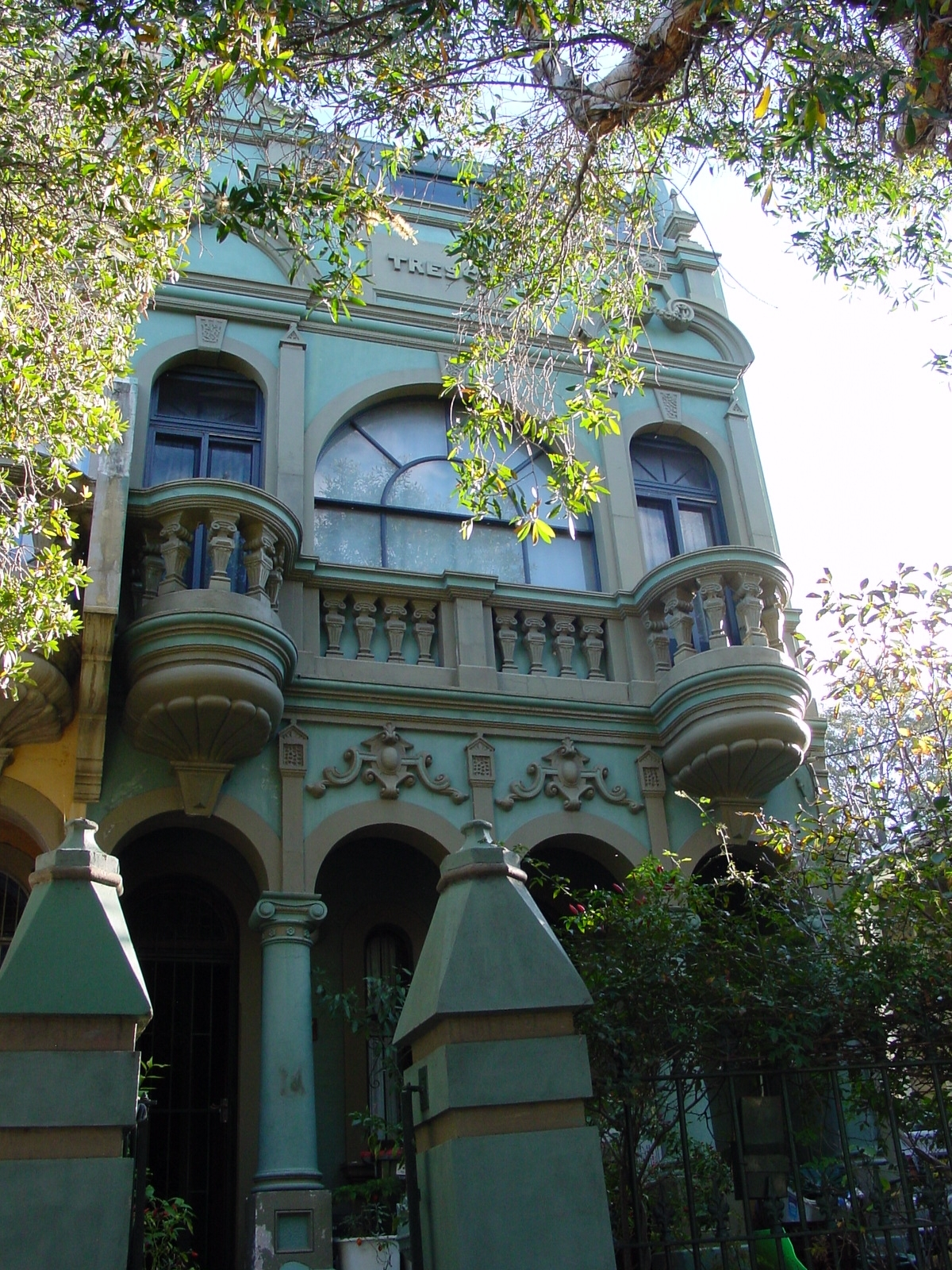
Tresco, elaborately decorated Italianate terrace, Watkin Street

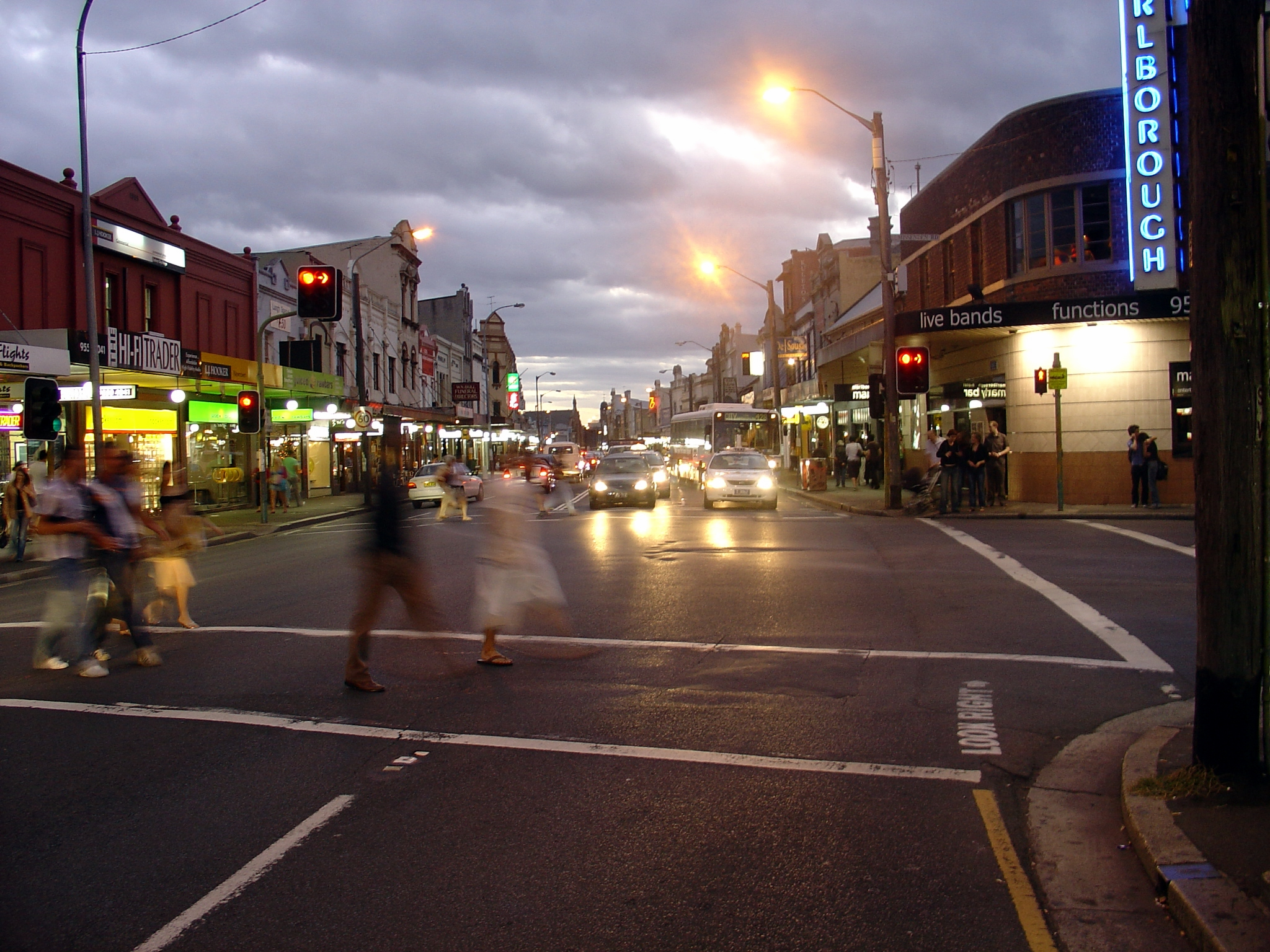
King Street, Newtown at night.

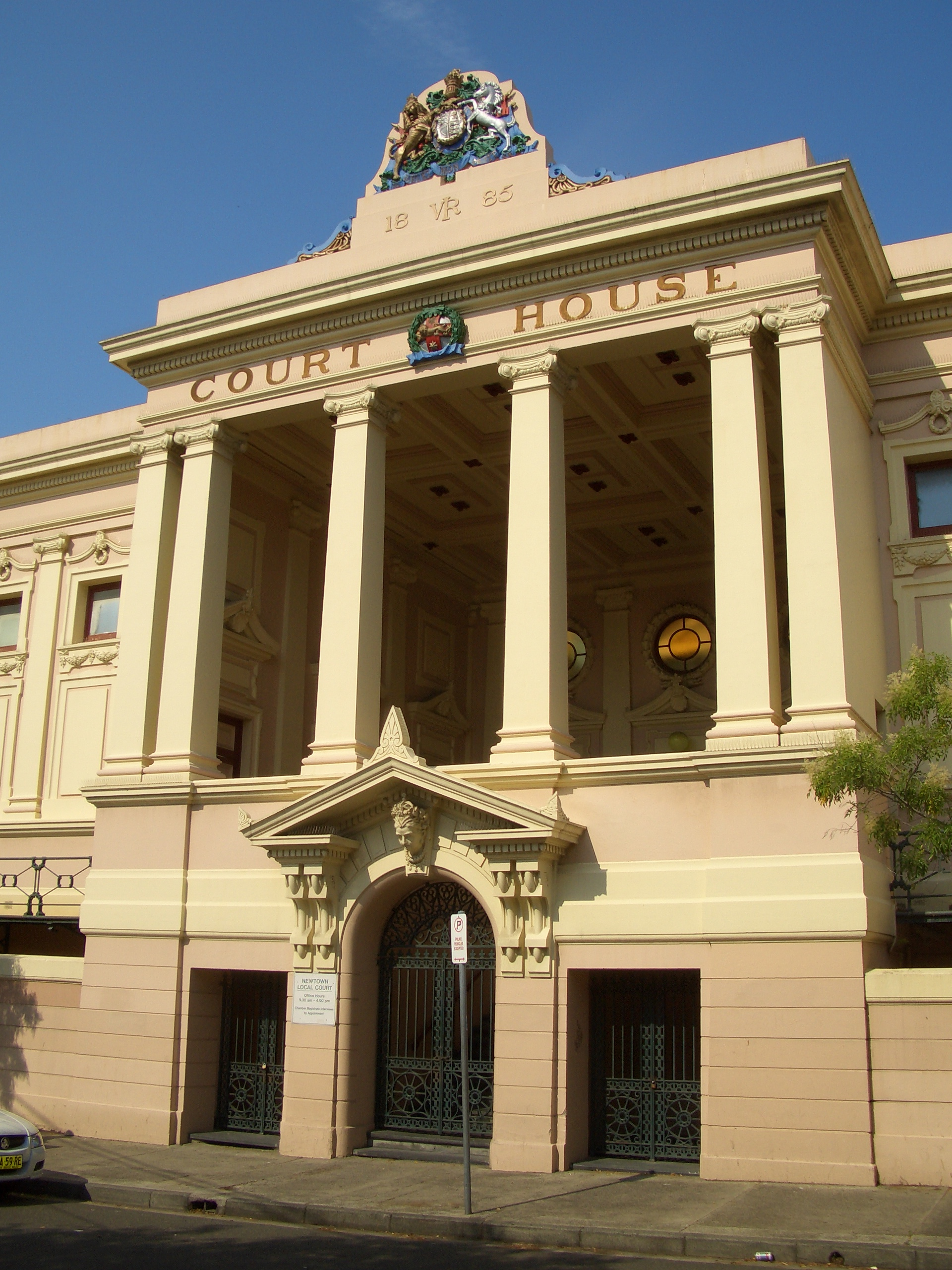
Newtown Court House, architect James Barnet, 1885.

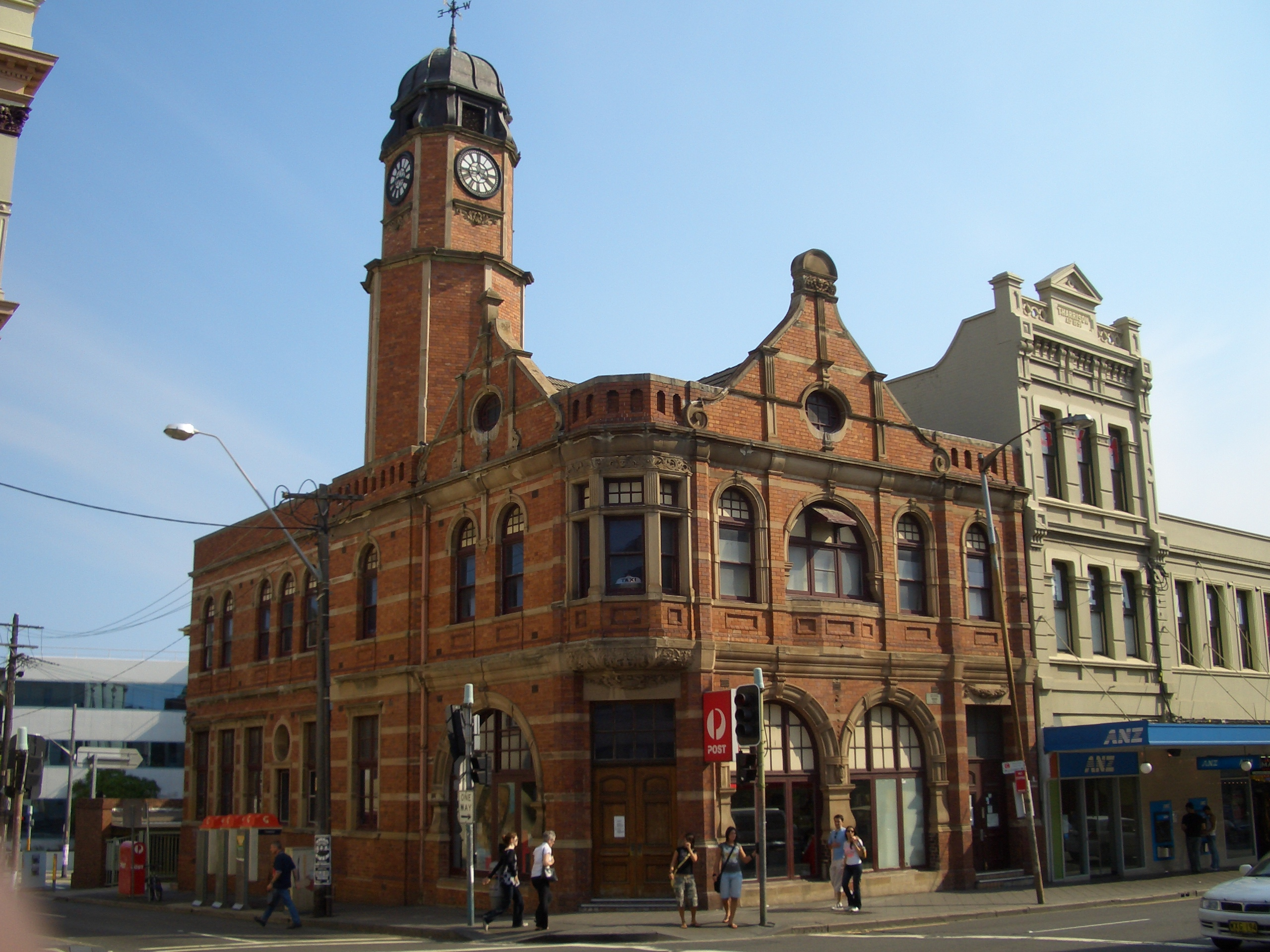
Newtown Post Office.

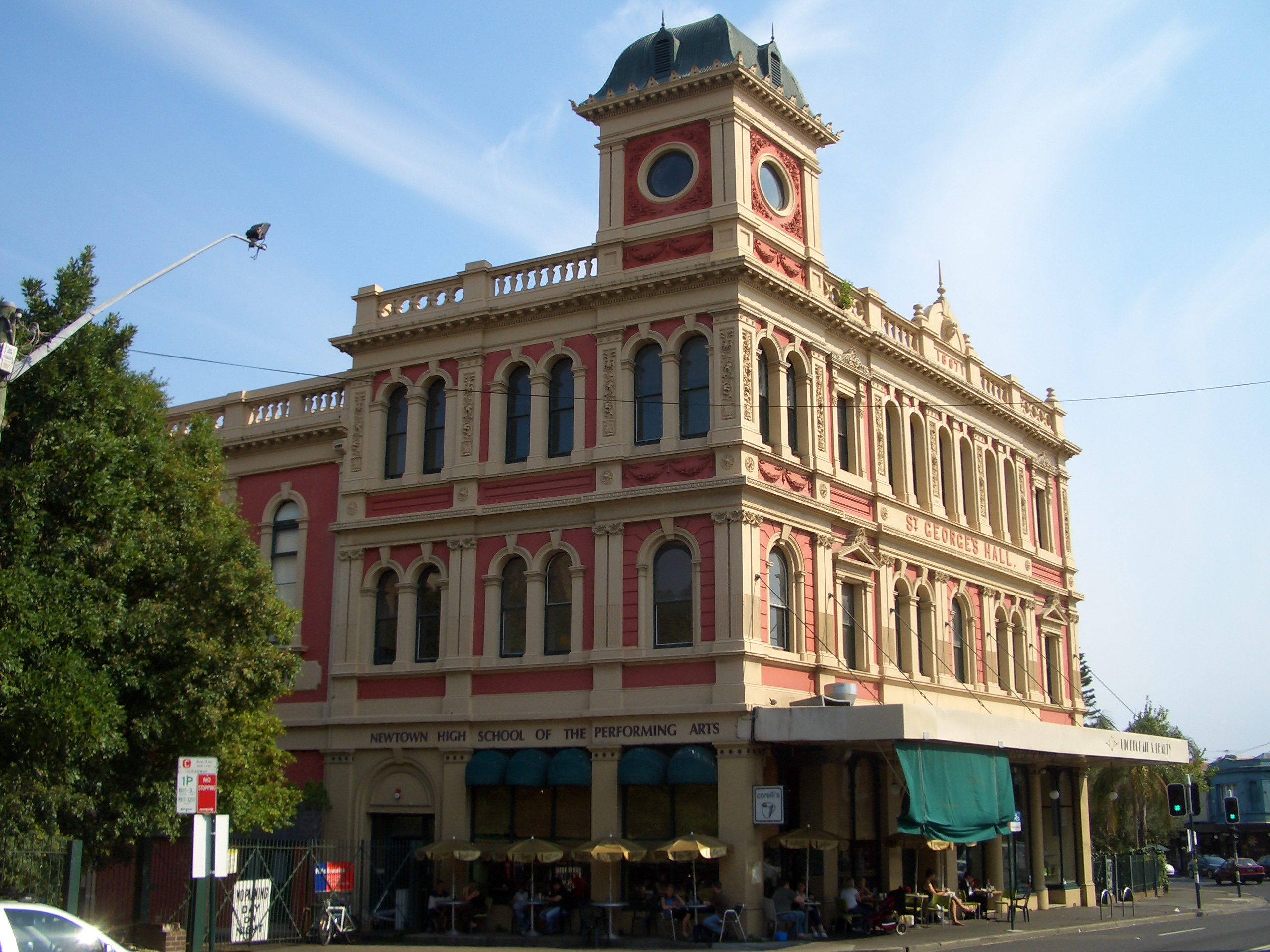
St George's Hall, 1887

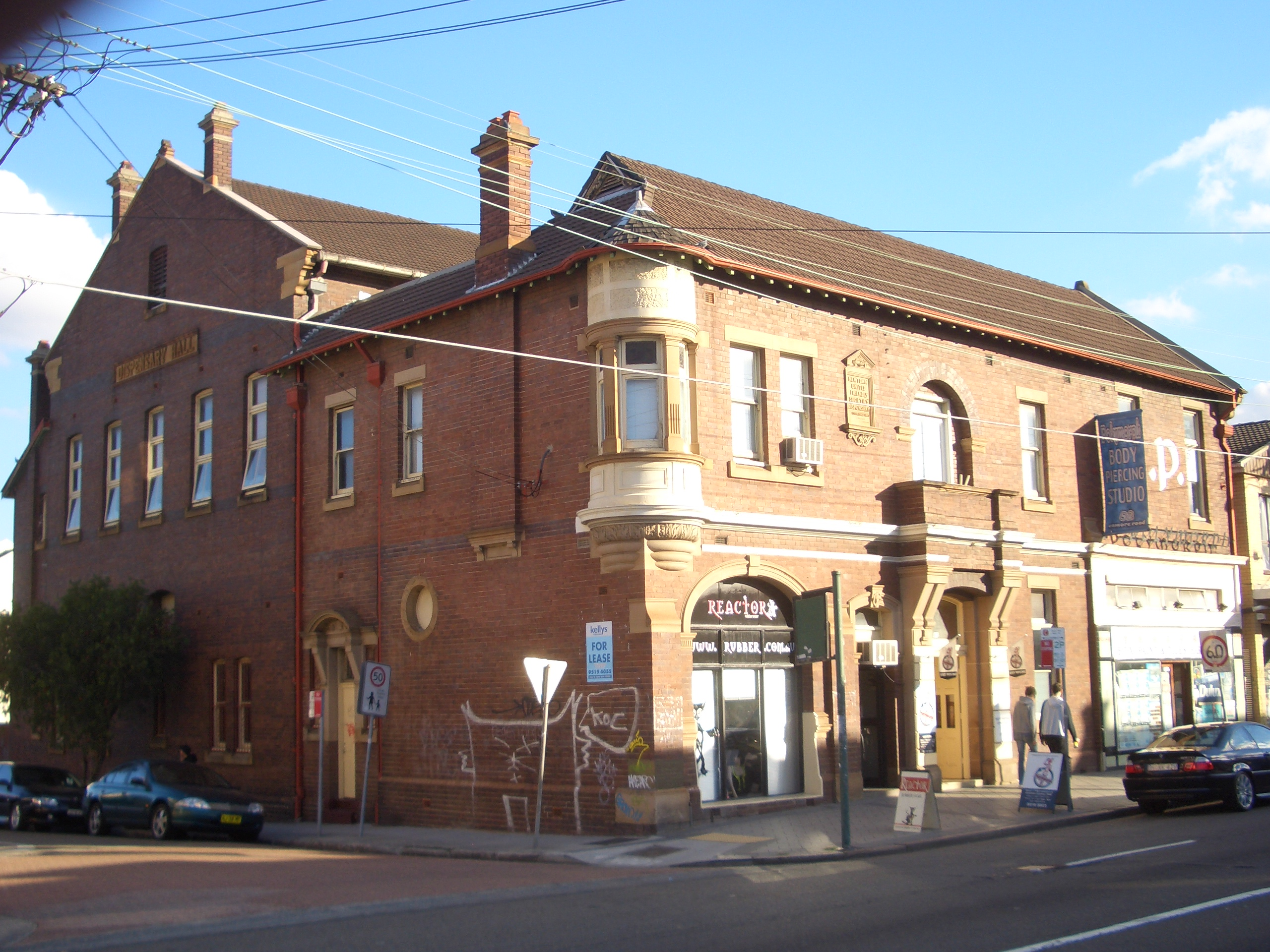
Dispensary Hall, Enmore Road

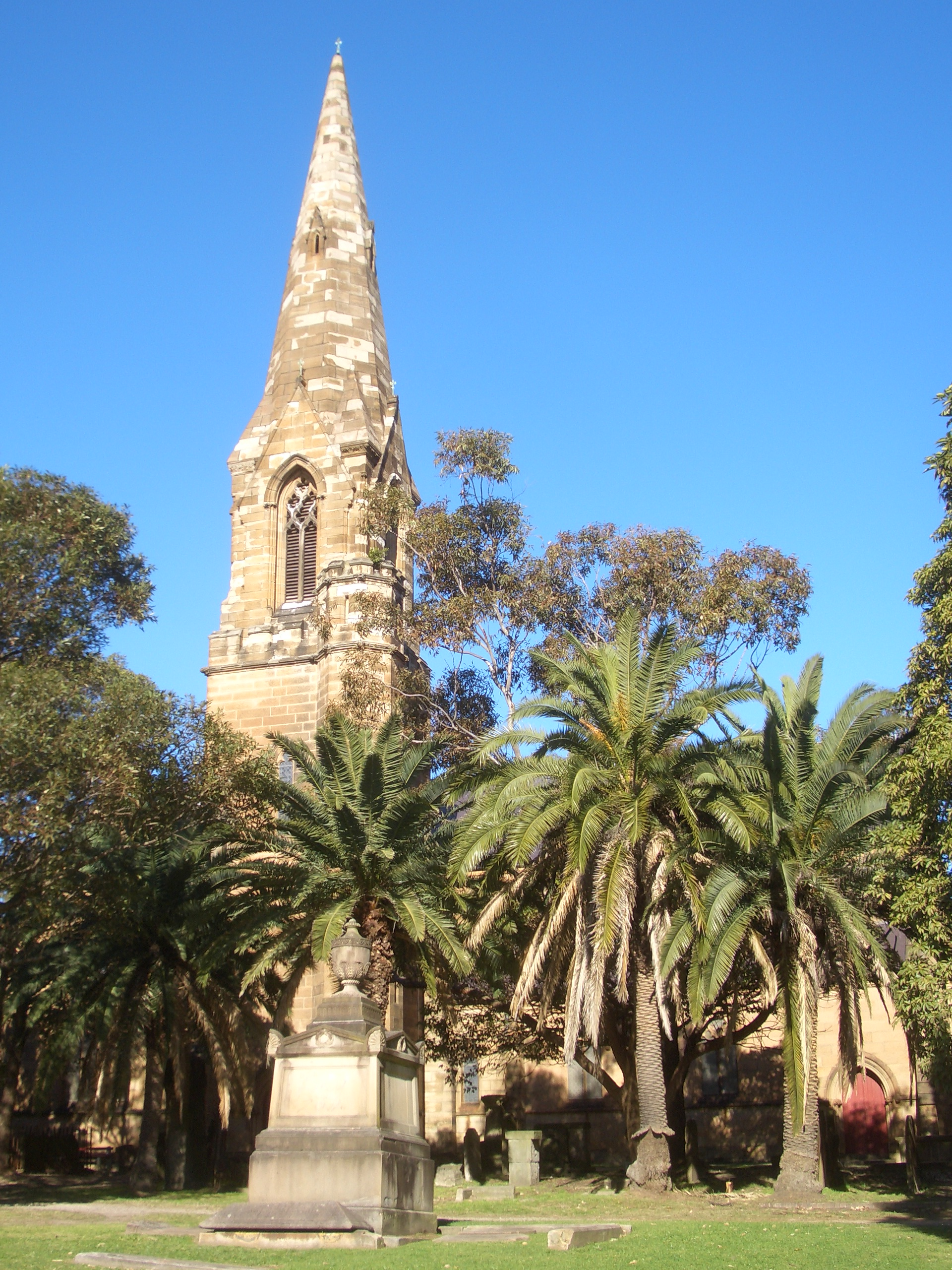
St Stephen's Anglican Church

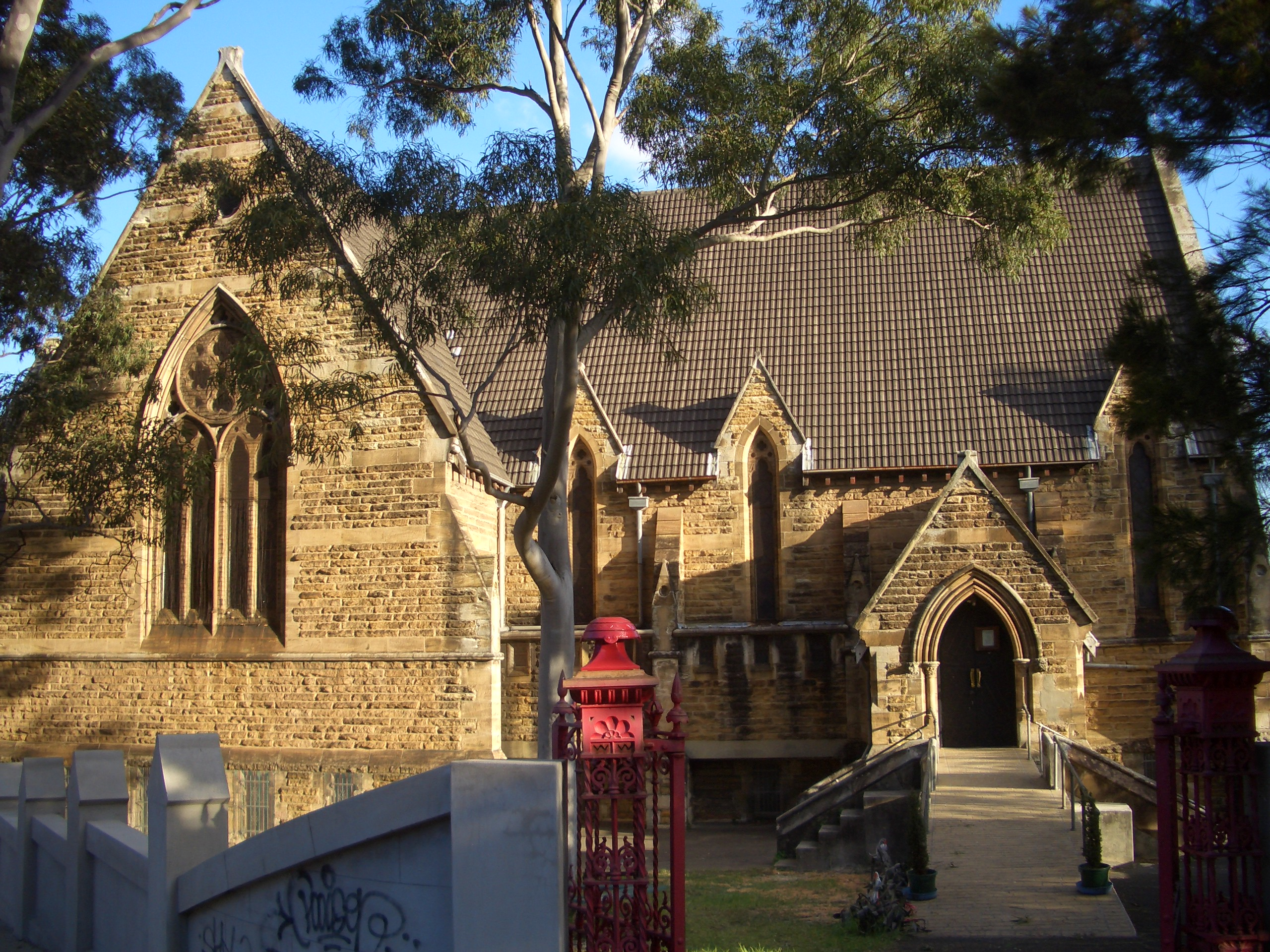
St Joseph's Catholic Church

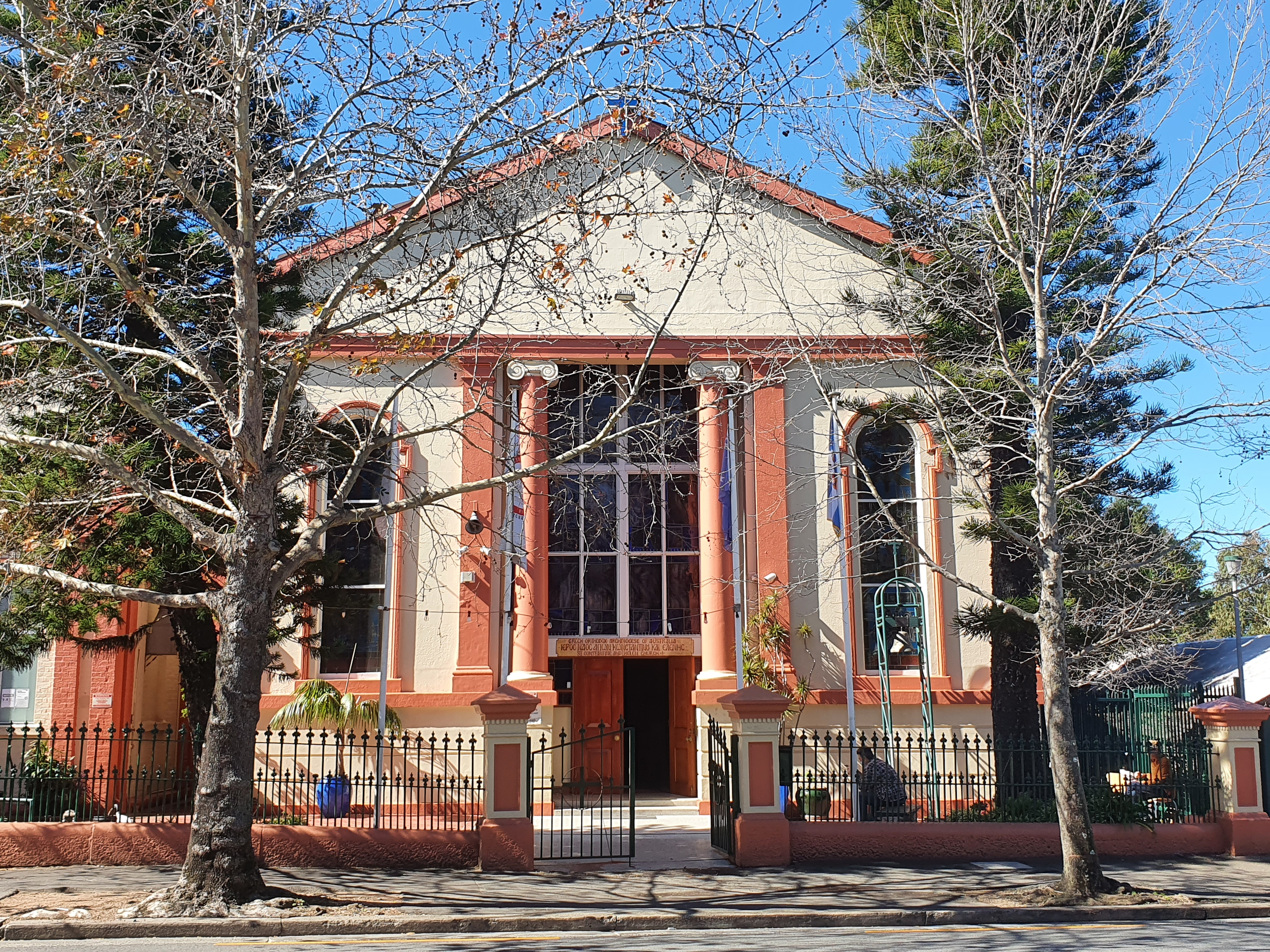
Sts Constantine & Helen Greek Orthodox Church

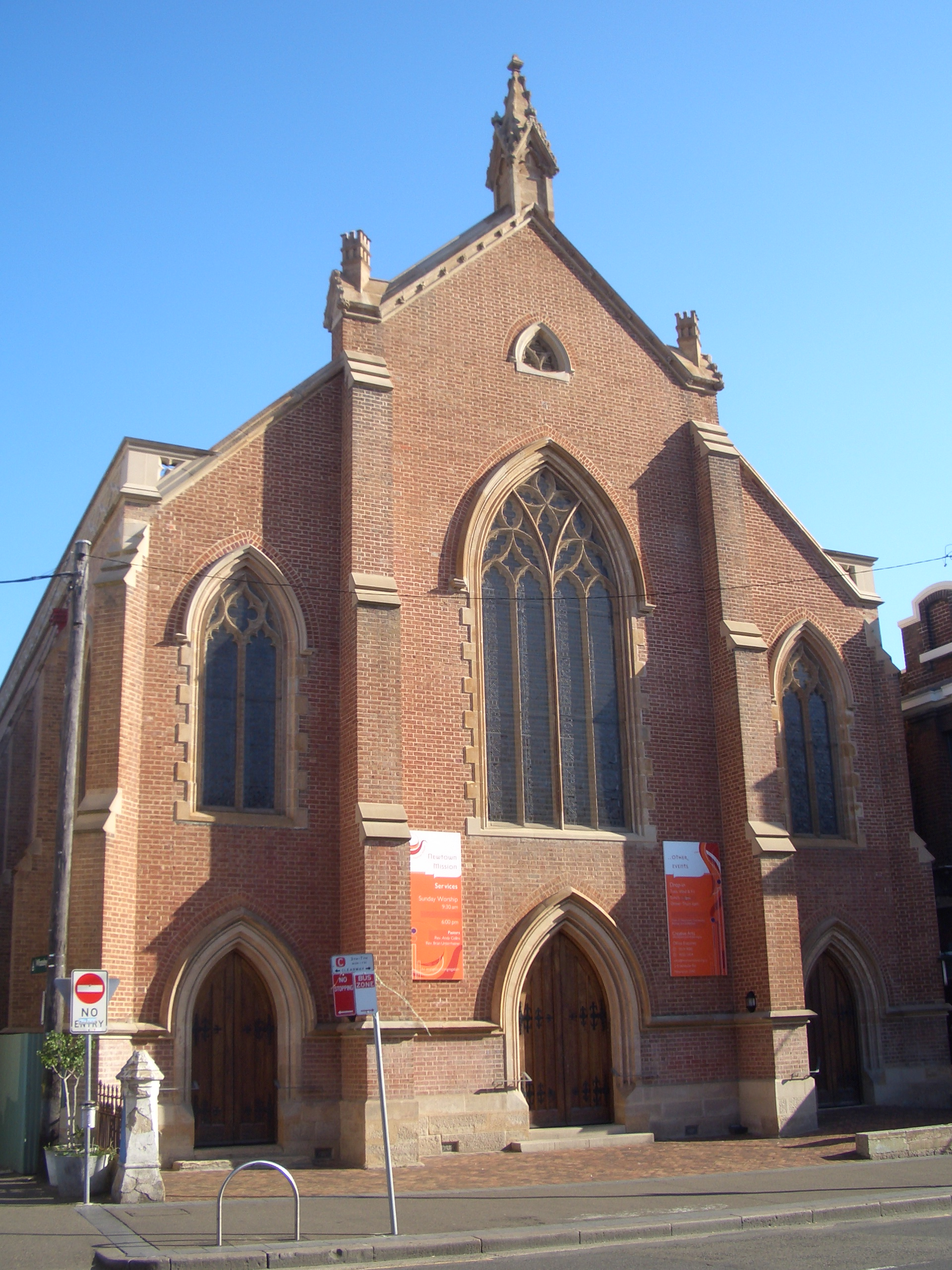
Mission Uniting Church

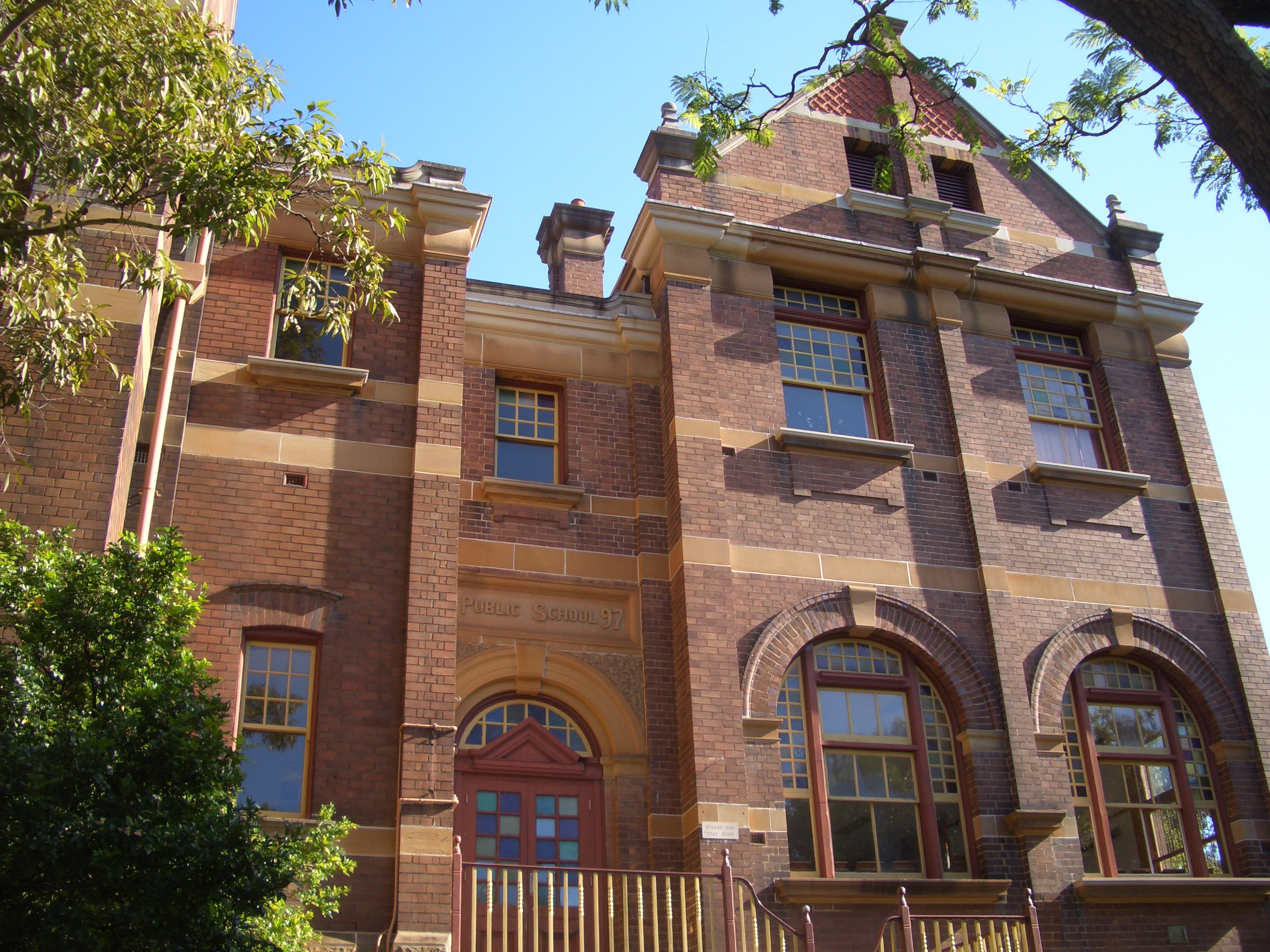
Newtown North Public School
