= Nicholas Devine =

Nicholas Devine, also spelled Divine (1739? County Cavan, Ireland – May 29, 1830), was an Irish prison official who was superintendent of convicts for New South Wales, Australia, from 1790 to 1808.

Devine obtained land grants in what was to become Erskineville.

After Devine's death, a legal battle occurred over his estate. This led to Doe dem Devine v. Wilson and Others, popularly known as the "Newtown Ejectment Case".
