= Ivanhoe Park cultural landscape =

- Location in Sydney Ivanhoe Park cultural landscape (Australia)
- 33°47′45″S 151°16′59″E
- Location: Sydney Road, Manly, New South Wales, Australia

Site notes
- Owner: Department of Planning, Housing & Infrastructure

New South Wales Heritage Register
- Official name: Ivanhoe Park (including Manly Oval) cultural landscape; Manly Park
- Type: State heritage (landscape)
- Designated: 23 August 2019
- Reference no.: 2029
- Type: Urban Park
- Category: Parks, Gardens and Trees

Ivanhoe Park cultural landscape is a heritage-listed former clubhouse, croquet court, cycling, tramway and pleasure garden and now scout hall, sports venue, commemorations, park, passive recreation, childcare centre and community building at Sydney Road, Manly, New South Wales, Australia. It is also known as Ivanhoe Park (including Manly Oval) cultural landscape and Manly Park. The property is owned by the Department of Planning, Housing & Infrastructure.

== History ==
=== Pre and post-contact ===
Situated immediately between the inner harbour to south, the ocean beach to the east, the entry point to North Head to the south east, the eastern escarpment plateau and fertile lands north, the land of Ivanhoe Park and Manly Oval. Ivanhoe Park's eastern end (now bowling greens, Manly Oval and tennis courts) is on low land prone to flooding and tidal surges. Some or all of that land was likely swamp country vegetated by mangroves and reeds for basket making and home to various crustacea, fish, birds and plant food supplies. Rising westwards in the park (currently botanic gardens) are reasonably steep slopes of sandstone which could well have offered shelter (ideally facing east and north east) and firewood. Most importantly, flowing down these slopes was at least one watercourse providing essential potable water. Water courses still flow through Ivanhoe Park. This environment provided good food supplies from the sea and mangrove swamp areas.

Early records of the first European contact with Aboriginals near present-day Manly attest that they were numerous and well settled. "The explorers attempted to count the number of indigenous Australians around the north shores (of the Middle Harbour/Manly area) saw 94 men, 34 women, six children and 67 canoes, but they felt many more were hidden from sight." Various early records demonstrate that the "Kay-ye-my" (Note: Since recorded as Kay-ye-mai, Kyeemai, Gayamay.) people of the Manly area, as Arthur Phillip called them, had a rich heritage.

Describing Captain Arthur Phillip's arrival in North Arm in January 1788, it is recorded "The boats, in passing near a point of land in this harbour, were seen by a number of men and twenty of them waded into the water unarmed, received what was offered them and examined the boats with a curiosity that gave me a much higher opinion of them, than I had formed from the behaviour of those seen in Captain Cook's voyage. And their confidence and Manly behaviour made me give the name of Manly Cove to this place." Phillip was impressed by the stature and inquisitiveness of these Aboriginals.

Aboriginal life in the Manly area was well observed by Phillip, Hunter and Bradley and others in the very early years of colonisation (1788-1790). Together, as detailed in Curby's book they recorded a quite sophisticated and enduring people in the area. Curby wrote: "For at least 20,000 years before Europeans passed through this grand "entrance" (Sydney Heads) Aboriginal people lived in what is now known as the Manly district, but which they knew as "Kay-ye-my". They fished in the pure sparkling waters, gathered food in the dunes and swamps, and hunted in the eucalypt forests and open heath country."

Many petroglyphs depicting various sea and land creatures, canoes and other aboriginal equipment, in cultural sites around demonstrate the aboriginals' cultural advance. Curby, ibid p 19, records that in an encounter between Phillip and the Kay-ye-my people on 28 May 1788, one man took back a crawfish to "the hut". This indicates that huts, as well as shelters, were built for accommodation. indicates that on the hillside above Kay-ye-mai Point (the hillside leading up to the western end of Ivanhoe Park) were "many rock shelters providing cool shade from the hot sun, shelter from prevailing winds or a place to leave a stencilled ochre image of a hand or tool. Along the ridge tops (lying north of Ivanhoe Park) may have been fruiting trees and flowering plants and tall trees with bush honey and mammal life"

While tangible evidence of these activities has not been identified in Ivanhoe Park, its close proximity to the Kay-ye-mai people's gathering place provide strong circumstantial evidence of such use. Further illuminating the Kay-ye-my lifestyle, Virginia Macleod writes: "They controlled vegetation on land by regular burning to flush out prey and create clear glades which facilitated hunting".

In less than a year of European arrival in 1788, over half the indigenous population living in the Sydney Basin had died from smallpox. The region, once alive with a vibrant mix of Aboriginal clans, now fell silent. Those not ravaged by disease were displaced when land was cleared for settlements and farms. Dispossessed of the land that had nourished them for so long, the Aboriginal people became dependent on white food and clothing. Alcohol, used as a means of trade by the British, served to further shatter traditional social and family structures and traditional use of the land and water. The area of Manly Council is the site of a number of historical notations relating to the early contact between the encroaching Europeans and local Aboriginal people.

- 22 January 1788 – two cutters and a long boat enter the Harbour and encounter Aboriginal people of the Gayamaygal clan at North Harbour who wade out to the boats and make a strong impression on Captain Phillip.
- 1789 – Arabanoo kidnapped from Manly Cove by Europeans.
- 1790 – Governor Phillip speared in Manly by Willemering.
- Corroborees held at Manly on the site of several churches above Careening Cove. During the visit of Albert Prince of Wales, the Koori visitors come from different Guringai, (Note: Guringai, Gringai, Ku-ring-gai is a name coined by John Fraser, in 1891 to define a super-tribe that he claimed stretched from the Macleay River to south of Sydney. It is now used to describe the language group from north of Sydney Harbour to Broken Bay.) Darkinyung and Garigal areas to dance a large corroboree Mrs Janet Kennedy (née Williams) recalls "that the Manly district contained a number of Aboriginal camps". The people were living on a mixture of British food (especially tea, flour and sugar) and bush tucker.
- Manly carrier R. J. Wild claims to have witnessed the last Aboriginal corroboree in Manly held on vacant land near St Matthew's Church on the Corso in the late 1870s.

"It was discovered that in every part of the low levels skeletons of natives were dug up in a fair state of preservation, proving that the submersion theory of the flat was untenable. Mr. Adam Russell, who planted Manly with trees, says, "I never dug a hole without coming upon some portion of a skeleton, particularly in the low levels." (Note: Adam Russell was overseer of the tree plantings by the Beautification Committee for Manly Council in about 1877.)

Local Aboriginal people have connections with Ivanhoe Park. For example, David Watts, manager of the Aboriginal Heritage Office, grew up in Manly and remembers an Aboriginal man (possibly called Dave) who used to throw boomerangs on the oval. David Watts himself would cut across Ivanhoe Park on his way to the shore to go fishing as a boy in the 1970s. The areas surrounding Ivanhoe Park include a number of recorded Aboriginal sites. Within 300 metres (980 ft) there are three rock shelters, one with rock art and shell midden and two others with shell midden. Within 500 metres (1,600 ft) there are rock engravings and more rock shelters. Within 1 kilometre (0.62 mi) there are more rock engravings, shell middens and a burial site. The burial was uncovered in 2011 and found to be of an Aboriginal women from the 1830s. This suggests that the land was important for ritual practice, even after European settlers were established. The AHO previously mapped Ivanhoe Park as High Aboriginal heritage Potential due to the surviving landscape features (sandstone features suitable for engravings, shelters, grinding grooves are present and/or land is in areas likely to contain Aboriginal archaeological material) and lack of intensive previous assessment / accessibility. The oval was mapped as Low Aboriginal heritage Potential, due to the greater modification for the oval, grandstand and associated infrastructure. This was based on tangible heritage.

A further review of intangible cultural heritage indicates the area was important for practices such as burials, rituals, and cultural events. Koradgee /medicine men known to have led ceremonies at North Head and across the shared Northern Sydney area. Early portraits of Aboriginal people show them painted in different coloured ochre, with different patterns and applications for different cultural events, e.g. funerals, war, marriages and corroborees.

The rock art, rock shelters and midden sites in the nearby area also suggest use of Ivanhoe Park, and its surrounds for day to day living. These areas may have been gathering places for people to eat, socialise, and create art. The swamp area of Manly (including where the bowling greens and Manly Oval now stands), would have provided Aboriginal people with resources such as food, fibre, shelter and medicine. The midden sites indicate a rich diet of seafood, and to the subsistence habits of early Aboriginal people. Both the marine harbour and freshwater swamp resources would have been exploited. Migratory and local water birds would have flocked to this area, also providing seasonal food and eggs for the population of the time.

=== Colonial development of Manly ===
The earliest land-grants in central Manly were granted in 1810; 12 hectares (30 acres) granted to Gilbert Baker, a constable and Richard Cheers was granted 40 hectares (100 acres). Until the mid-1850s, Manly was undeveloped bushland. "In 1836, in Governor Bourke's time, the parish of Manly was computed to contain 43 souls, including 14 Government men clearing the quarantine ground. "In 1850," says a writer, "the district was nearly as wild as when Captain Phillip first found it." Charles De Boos says, "the beginnings were all in tyranny, blood, and crime;" but these things have all passed away with happier and more settled conditions. A sort of "cattle duffing," amounting to bushranging, prevailed, some murders being committed, which even living residents remember, and much "dark work" going on in those wild and lawless days, it being too far away and ungetatable for Sydney to exercise much control. The names of some of the early settlers were the Whalans, Collins, Parker, Mildwater, Miles, Wilson, Fell, Smith, and Symons, many of whose relations are still in the district, though none of the originals remain to tell of Manly prior to the settlement by Henry Gilbert Smith, about 1852."

==== Henry Gilbert Smith ====
Henry Gilbert Smith, an early entrepreneur, often referred to as the "father of Manly", played a significant role in the early development of Manly. In 1853, acquired 100 acres at what was then referred to as Cabbage Tree Bay from John and Anne Mary Thompson. He wrote to his family about Manly: "Its situation, 7 or 8 miles from Sydney by water, is as fine a thing as you can imagine and it takes in the only ground which has the sea beach on one side and a fine sandy cove on the other...". After some initial failures as a merchant, Smith started succeeding in his commercial ventures and in 1835, he was elected a director of the Commercial Banking Co. of Sydney, and in 1853, as the chairman to its board of directors. Additionally, in 1835, he became the virtually independent Sydney agent of the Bathurst Bank. He left for England in 1836 and on his return in 1846, he was appointed provisional director of the proposed railway association. Later he was one of the three government directors of the Sydney Railway Co. From May 1856 to August 1858, he was a member of the Legislative Council. Between 1853 and 1855, Smith acquired a consolidated estate in Manly. While living in Darling Point, he spent two days a week in Manly, where he had erected two iron houses, which were prefabricated and imported. Later he built a fine stone house in Fairlight, adjacent to Manly.

Smith commissioned a plan of Manly north of The Corso as far as the present Pine Street (including the present day Ivanhoe Park), which he called Ellensville, in memory of his late first wife. The village was advertised as lying on a "retired and beautiful site", laid out as marine retreats, proposed to become a favourite resort of the colonists, close to two ocean beaches. The bulk of the land that forms the present-day Ivanhoe Park was divided up into allotments identified for sale as per the Ellensville plan (1855). However, this plan was not successful and abandoned in 1859 and his surveyors created a new village called Brighton, and allotments were offered for sale in 1860. Smith realised that there was more to a village than streets and buildings so set aside several small recreation reserves. Smith marked out a public reserve along Kangaroo Street escarpment and included a new kangaroo carving on a stone plinth. He also set aside a part of Belgrave Street, south of Raglan Street into a long narrow recreation area (of what is now Gilbert Park and also the area between Sydney Road and Raglan Street now occupied by the tennis courts.) Smith owned the 8 acres immediately west of the small reserve (where the tennis courts now stand but this land was never developed). Although Ellensville and later Brighton were not successful ventures, these laid down the structure of Manly. The western strip of Smith's Brighton projected recreation reserve is represented today by the West Promenade and the eastern edge of Ivanhoe Park.

As part of his vision for the seaside resort Smith initially had chartered a paddle steamer to Manly and other vessels visited on an ad hoc "excursion" basis. Smith built a wharf in 1855 and eventually acquired an interest in steamers himself and soon more regular services to Manly had commenced. Manly was popular as a delightful watering place and the number of annual visitors in 1857 had grown to around 30,000. Henry realised quickly the necessity of providing several recreation reserves for public use in his subdivision, and he was prepared to donate these free of charge. At first these were sufficient to cope with the small local population and a fairly limited number of excursionists but by the late 1860s, with improved ferry services and a much larger influx of visitors, it was found necessary to look further afield for a larger recreation area, suitable particularly for more competitive sports. After the death of his second wife Anne Margaret Smith in April 1866, H G Smith sub-divided much of Brighton, and in February 1867 left Manly and Australia for England, with his three sons. Whilst living in England, Henry still maintained control of what he called his Brighton Estate at Manly Beach and he was able to make sales and transact other business through his attorney. "The Ivanhoe Park was laid out under Mr. Smith's direction; also the planting of Port Jackson fig trees and Norfolk Island pines in the esplanades and the Corso."

It was soon after the subdivision of Brighton Estate that Thomas Rowe purchased what is now the western part of Ivanhoe Park. Thomas Rowe became one of NSW most prominent and influential architects and the first mayor of Manly in 1877. It appears he did not develop this steep and rocky parcel of land. Although Manly was marketed by Smith as the Brighton of the South Pacific, the official name of Manly was adopted when council was incorporated as a local government body on 6 January 1877. By 1873 Smith had sold the lease to the wharf and his share of the steamers to the operators of the ferries. The business was later acquired by John Randal Carey (who later founded the Daily Telegraph ) in 1875 and together with three other businessmen formed the Port Jackson Steamship Company Limited on 23 January 1877.

=== Ivanhoe Park ===
The earliest known mention of Manly's Ivanhoe Park is from January 1871, when two adjoining pavilions (a large dancing pavilion and octagonal refreshments room) left over from the 1870 Intercolonial Exhibition held in Sydney's Prince Alfred Park were transferred and erected in Ivanhoe Park by businessman W H Wardle. The pavilion was used for dances, picnics and church outings in the 1870s. It was erected at the foot of the hill on the block of Smith's 8ha behind the small reserve he has established along Belgrave Street (about 60 m from where the grandstand now stands). It is not known when the name Ivanhoe Park was first used, however it was still in the hands of HG Smith when the name commenced being used and is thought to be named after Sir Walter Scott's famous novel. (Note: The park was also referred to as Manly Park as evident in some later subdivision maps.) The pavilion anchored Anniversary Day (Australia Day) celebrations and amusements in Ivanhoe Park for NSW residents, including sports, brass bands, dancing and novelty races. The pavilion was later demolished in 1893.

Manly, as a popular watering destination had steamer trips promoted since mid-nineteenth century encouraging visitors to Manly. The return trips often included concerts, food and/or picnics. With the improvement of ferry services to Manly in the 1860s, increasingly large numbers of excursionists from Sydney, and widely across NSW, visited Ivanhoe/Manly Park for recreational pleasure. However, most of what is now Ivanhoe Park/Manly Oval was still owned by HG Smith in the 1870s. The park was initially enclosed with a two-rail fence from Belgrave Street to a line of fence dividing the Oval and the Upper Park. In the 1860s, it was used for cricket. Ivanhoe Park served as a central public open space in Manly and was the venue for many public events including the annual picnic of the Eight Hours' League.

At this time, the Park was low-lying ground and in rainy season was covered with water extending from Belgrave Street up to the Bowling Green and extending across Raglan Street and even up to Denison Street and across Sydney Road. The park remained flooded until the water soaked away or evaporated. At the south west corner of the Park, was the Maze composed of wattle sticks about seven feet high placed closely together.

On 14 August 1879, a deputation from Manly Council met with the Premier, Henry Parkes, to propose that the State buy the parkland for the people of NSW. Introducing the deputation to the Premier, the Hon JS Farnell MLA said "it was unnecessary to use any argument in favour of the necessity for having public parks in centres of population, as it had been a matter of public policy that wherever land suitable for that purpose was to be had the Government should obtain it. He pointed out that Manly had a special claim for consideration in this matter, as it was the resort of thousands of visitors." In a similar spirit, cricket historian Tom Spencer reports that the then Mayor of Manly, Mr C Hayes had a confidential interview (year unknown) with the premier, Sir Alexander Stuart. Spencer records "He urged the land's resumption by the Government. This, he thought, would provide a magnificent asset not only for the people of Manly, but for the people of New South Wales and Australia as a whole, for even in those days tourists came from everywhere to visit Manly".

Through his attorney, Henry Gilbert Smith, who lived in England, sold the eastern portion of present Ivanhoe Park, amounting to about five acres, to Thomas Adrian, on 17 June 1880. On this land were the buildings known as the Pavilion and the Ivanhoe Hotel, for which Adrian had been granted a publican's licence in October 1875. In July 1880 Mr T S Parrott reported to Manly Council on the work in progress of laying 46-centimetre (18 in) pipes along Raglan Street to the ocean, for the purpose of draining the low-lying land in Ivanhoe Park. On 12 January 1881, at a public meeting in Manly to consider the best site for a public recreation reserve, (Note: the State Government having proposed a different site.) the Hon. George Thornton MLC said that "he felt it was the duty to the people of the colony generally, as much even as to the residents of Manly, to obtain both the inestimable boon of a public recreation ground at this, the premier water-place of the colony, and also to make quite sure that the most suitable place (viz Ivanhoe Park) was selected for such a purpose.".

In view of the lack of suitable recreation area in Manly, the announcement in September 881 the Ivanhoe Park, which was owned by Thomas Adrian, was to be subdivided into building sites and sold was of obvious interest to those who recognise d the value of the site for public use. Although Henry Gilbert Smith made provisions for reserves on his Brighton Estate, the most suitable site for a recreation ground, Ivanhoe Park was in private hands. The sale did not proceed, and the first Wildflower Show was held in the Park the following month. Adrian mortgaged Ivanhoe Park to Abraham Friedman in 1882, then defaulted on his payments. In 1883 Friedman ordered the whole property be sold. On 9 April 1883, a public meeting resolved that a deputation urge upon the Government "the desirability of purchasing the (Ivanhoe Park) site as a recreation reserve", which it was pointed out in the meeting "would serve as a boon not only to the residents of Manly, but also to the people of Sydney and the suburbs who daily visited Manly in large numbers."

The NSW Government bought Ivanhoe Park from A Friedman for A£6,000 on 17 December 1883, "vested in the Queen". The purchase was made to ensure its availability for the people of New South Wales as a pleasure destination. It also bought the western part of the present Ivanhoe Park on 19 February 1884 from Thomas Rowe for A£1,300. These purchases demonstrate the importance for the people of New South Wales that the State Government of the day attached to Ivanhoe Park.

It was announced in June 1884 the new council chambers would be conducted at the old Ivanhoe Park Hotel. A£20 was awarded to Arvid Wilson in February 1885 for his plans for the improvement of Ivanhoe Park. During 1885 continual improvements were made to the Park, including further drainage, filling the park to a uniform level, top dressing, planting shrubs and trees, lamp lighting, forming a cricket ground, a bicycle track, erecting a picket fence and planting trees and shrubs and improving drainage. These improvements enhanced the park, which "Ever since its inception (Ivanhoe Park) has provided an essential recreation area" for many sports, botanic gardens and clubs for the people of NSW.

In December 1885 Manly Council decided to incorporate the eastern end of the land, "the portion of the central reserve bounded by Fountain Street, West Promenade, East Promenade and Raglan Street shall hereafter form part of Manly Park, and that the Government be requested to close Eustace Street and West Promenade from Fountain Street to Raglan Street and The Avenue".

Sir Henry Parkes, Premier of NSW and "the Father of Federation", addressed the people of Manly in the Ivanhoe Park pavilion on at least two occasions. On Saturday 29 January 1887 "The pavilion was crowded with a large audience". The crowd heard Parkes speak about the issues facing the New South Wales Government in the 1887 state election, including the governance of New South Wales. On 5 November 1888 Parkes, then Premier of New South Wales, again addressed "a large audience". Parkes "compared the condition of the State of New South Wales with other comparable democracies". He went on to float his famous concept of federation of the colonies, saying "it would be a noble thing, and he firmly believed the time would come when those colonies would be federated into one great commonwealth - (applause) - but before that could take place we must above all learn what questions were of a federal nature". This address at Ivanhoe Park preceded Parkes' famous Tenterfield Oration on 24 October 1889, during which he called for the Federation of the six Australian colonies. While it is noted that the Tenterfield Oration is "allegorically considered to be the start of the federation process in Australia, that led to the foundation of the Commonwealth of Australia 12 years later", it was at Ivanhoe Park that Parkes tested his idea on the residents of New South Wales.

In the NSW Government Gazette of 7 June 1887, it was declared that certain portions of land would be added to the Public Park at Manly (being the northern part of Gilbert Park, later used for tennis courts, closure of part of West Promenade, closure part of Eustace Street, and closure of The Avenue). Thus, creating the park as it is today. Ivanhoe Park (then known as Manly Park) was officially proclaimed on 30 September 1887 and the council was appointed as trustee, and on 1 December 1887 the government officially handed over control of all public reserves at Manly to the council. The council was permitted to charge for admission to part of Ivanhoe Park from that date, and the proceeds helped in the upkeep and improvements to the park. Therefore, the area on which Ivanhoe Park is situated was conveyed by H G Smith in three deeds on 26 July 1879, 17 June 1880 and 29 September 1882 to the Municipality of Manly, Thomas Adrian and Thomas Rowe respectively; all of which was subsequently acquired by the council and proclaimed on 30 September 1887.

The recycling of building materials is not new. A good example of the practice might be the old Ivanhoe Park Hotel, which stood in Ivanhoe Park, Manly, for nearly fifty years. It was put up in 1875, from building material salvaged from the old post office in Wynyard Square. The post office was taken down, and the building materials were auctioned on 9 February 1875. By October of that year the materials had been transported to Manly and re-erected in Ivanhoe Park as the Hotel. A photograph in the NSW State Library collection of the old Wynyard Square post office shows a long low single-storey building, with no obvious structural resemblance to the hotel, so a bit of redesigning must have taken place.

When the hotel's popularity waned in the mid-1880s, the building was taken over for use as Manly Council Chambers. The first Council meeting held in the building was on 19 June 1884. The council used the premises until 1909. Following their departure to their current site, the building was then converted for use as a courthouse for the Court of Petty Sessions, which was opened on 3 June 1910. This use too became superseded in 1924 with the opening of the new Courthouse in Belgrave Street. Once again the building was dismantled, to allow for an expansion of the Manly Oval playing area, and once again, the building materials were re-used, this time being incorporated into the club-rooms of the Manly Sporting Union. (Posted 24 December 2012 by Manly Library)

==== Ivanhoe Park - Pleasure Grounds ====
An article in the Illustrated Sydney News on 18 March 1871 described Ivanhoe Park in some detail: "Ivanhoe Park is a pleasure ground admirably adapted for the enjoyment of visitors. It is spacious, sheltered and shaded with numerous trees-some of them most grotesquely shaped. The dancing pavilion affords almost unlimited space for dancers and, is perhaps the most spacious and substantial of its kind, being roofed with corrugated iron, glazed at the sides and otherwise protected. Adjoining this is an octagonal pavilion of good proportions and highly ornamental appearance, used as a refreshment room: and in addition to these there are several ornamental buildings for the shelter of visitors" Although the official proclamation of the Ivanhoe Park took place in 1877, the park land was being used since the late 1860s and early 1870s. A concert was held in the large pavilion at the Ivanhoe Park on 30 January 1872 to raise funds for the Manly Cricket Club.

An advertisement for Manly's Ivanhoe Park for the Prince of Wales' birthday celebrations on the 8th of November 1878 included Cricket, Quoits, Football, Skittles, Croquet, Swings and Climbing the greasy pole. Dancing to a first-class String Band was included.

Ivanhoe Park was a favourite destination for NSW residents throughout the 1870s with increasing numbers of events held and burgeoning visitor numbers attending for pleasurable recreation. For example:

- on Anniversary Day 26 January 1872, three steamers carried many NSW residents from Queens Wharf via Woolloomooloo Bay to attend "a great variety of daytime attractions";
- in 1877 New Year's Day celebrations with "unrivalled attractions" were held in the park. In September 1881 the first Wild Flower Show in NSW was held in the Ivanhoe Park Pavilion. On 1 October 1881, "there were nearly 3,000 visitors", proving how popular the flower show was in NSW. Wild flower shows were held for most years until 1895. For the second show, "steamers packed with visitors (mainly women) arrived over two weekends. The crowds flooded into the pavilion at Ivanhoe Park..."

By 1884 the Wild Flower Show had "attained a great celebrity. It was now a well-known event throughout Sydney and was copied in a number of places". In 1886, the Melbourne Argus dated 9 September 1886, reported on the opening of that year's Manly Wildflower Show by Lady Carrington, the wife of the Governor. Attended by "the Governor, Admiral Tyron, the members of the Ministry, and members of both branches of the legislature", the arrangements were described as being "carried out on a most liberal scale" and the wild flowers "the finest collection ever seen in Sydney, and displayed in a most attractive form". The governor of NSW Lord Jersey opened the show in 1891 declaring it a "household word in Sydney". One SMH correspondent wrote: "this, the first wild-flower show in the colony... has attained a celebrity entirely dissociated from creed or class."

After the Pavilion was demolished in 1893 there was a long period before a replacement was constructed. In November 1894 the Mayoress of Manly opened a "handsome little" pavilion which had just been completed for the use of members of the cricket club, and a pavilion was erected for the tennis club on the east side of the reserve adjacent to the tennis courts. In 1902 a neat picket fence enclosed the playing area, the tennis courts were separated from the oval, and the pavilion on the hill was fenced in. By 1905 the croquet club had built a pavilion on land opposite the Post Office. The grandstand was opened on 9 April 1910 by Mayor James Bonner, and cost (Pounds)780 to build, to the design of Fred Trenchard Smith. It replaced the earlier, very small pavilion (a little more than a shelter shed). It could accommodate 300 people, with room for a further 30 on the top gallery level, which must have had a fine scenic view of Manly. It was built on the most up-to-date lines but was showing its age by 1945 when the Manly District Cricket Club urged for a new pavilion saying the old one was a disgrace. The club had to wait until the early 1960s, when it was decided to replace it.

The Manly Sporting Union was formed c. 1924. It was proposed the Oval area should be enlarged by removing the trees inside the fence near the tennis courts, and by reconfiguring the tennis courts. Tenders to supply additional seating accommodation at the oval in June 1924, and the old Court House building was removed, presenting an opportunity to enlarge the available area of the Oval. Council agreed to allow the Scouts and Guides an area behind the Manly Oval pavilion where a Girl Guides' clubroom was constructed in 1924 from materials of the demolished court house and a Scout drill hall was built and opened in September 1925.

In 1928 a caretaker's residence was built near the bowling greens, and a new tennis pavilion was built as well as additions to the croquet club rooms. In 1935 the Tennis Club applied to Manly Council for a loan to build a two-storey brick clubhouse. In 1962 Council approved a A£50,000 redevelopment at the oval. It also saw the demolition of the old timber pavilion and dressing rooms after 54 years. Larger brick dressing rooms and a concrete grandstand with a large apexed roof covering a section of the seating were erected on the site officially opened in 1963. This new grandstand was, in 1988, dedicated to Tony Miller rugby union player for Manly and the Australian Wallabys.

The 1962 redevelopment included a new Girl Guides and kindergarten building in Ivanhoe Park. In July 1973 the current Scout Hall was erected, and the old drill hall was demolished. The grandstand was re-built in 2001 and its roof, a round plate type structure, has colloquially become known as the Flying Saucer although it was designed with the stingray in mind. In 2006 the Geographical Names Board named the reserve at the western end of the park Ivanhoe Park Botanic Garden.

==== Ivanhoe Park - sporting venues ====
Ivanhoe Park has been used for a varied number of sporting activities since 1867. Cricket, tennis, lawn bowls, rugby, lacrosse, cycling, hockey, croquet clubs were well catered for. The development of sporting clubs that played a key part in the early cultural development of Sydney and Australia, including the Manly Cricket Club (formed 1878), Manly Rugby Union Football Club (formed 1883), Manly Tennis Club (formed 1884), and Manly Lawn Bowls Club (formed 1894).

Cricket

Ivanhoe Park was the venue for one of a small number of matches played in New South Wales by the first Australian sporting team to contest international sport (de Moore, 2008). Shortly after their arrival in Sydney on 16 February 1867, the first Aboriginal cricket team played a match on 27 Feb 1867 at the ground in Manly as part of preparation for their tour of the United Kingdom. " The Australian Club, yesterday, played a match against Manly Beach, on the ground at the rear of the Pier Hotel". It is highly probable that this match was played on the grounds that were to become Ivanhoe Park, being undeveloped ground behind the Pier Hotel (including land noted on the 1860 map of Brighton 'Reserved for Public Recreation). The Aboriginal cricketers, who came from south-western Victoria, were accompanied during their visit and coached by then cricketing star Tom Wills (also the co-founder of Australian Rules football; de Moore, 2008). On arrival in Sydney after their sea journey via Melbourne, the team was met and accommodated at his property in Manly by British and New South Wales cricketer Charles Lawrence, who managed them during their 1868 contest in England. The Sydney Morning Herald article also noted "Of the condition and general character of the ground, little that is favourable can be said; its roughness militated against good bowling, and the extent of level is too limited. It is, however, improvable, and a good cricket ground would be no unimportant addition to the attraction of our principal marine retreat" In 1871 a cricket ground was established on Ivanhoe Park and the pavilion was used by the Manly Beach Cricket Club, which held a cricket match and amateur concert there on 16 December 1871 to raise funds. In 1872 Manly Cricket Club organised an even bigger event at Ivanhoe Park which included circus performers.

Manly Warringah District Cricket Club was founded in 1878 and a foundation club in the Sydney grade competition. It is the second oldest existing district cricket club in New South Wales (previously known as Manly Cricket Club, and Manly Beach Cricket Club from the mid-1860s). The Club's home ground and training venue is the picturesque Manly Oval. Manly Oval is the recreational showpiece of the northern beaches and the gateway to Manly. It is also the venue of some memorable encounters over the past century including a match in 1891 with Lord Sheffield's team which included the legendary W. G. Grace and a local Manly team of 22 players. Manly District Cricket Club's published history reported that "Famous Australian fastbowler F. R. Spofforth, wicketkeeper batsman W. L. Murdoch and the legendary fast bowler S. M. J. Woods were numbered among the many prominent cricketers who participated in some of the [early] games" between 1878 and 1893. Woods is noted to be "one of the very few cricketers who have represented both Australia and England in test matches." The club has produced 20 international cricketers, including the all-time great Keith Miller and more recently Stuart Clark and Michael Bevan. In February 1949 Manly Oval was the venue for England Women's XI against Australia. The game was drawn.

Rugby

Whilst the Manly District Rugby Union Football Club (Manly DRUFC) was formed in 1906, records have shown rugby was played in Manly prior to this - in 1883 the Manly Beach Football Club advertised in newspapers of its existence and that its home ground was Ivanhoe Park. (1883 is just 12 years after Rugby Football Unions formed in England and 11 years after Scotland.) In 1884 "Beach" was dropped and it became Manly Football Club. In 1892 two other rugby clubs were formed: the Manly Waratahs (the Manly cricket club still uses this name) and the Manly Federals Football Club. The Waratahs only lasted a few seasons.

At this time, a local gentleman, Frank L. Row played for Manly Federals and Wallaroos. Selected for NSW, he then was appointed as the first Wallaby captain. He played and captained Australia in their first test against the touring British Isles in 1899 at the SCG before a large crowd. Australia won 13–3.

Row retired as a player in 1903, then immersing himself in his passion for the inclusion of a Manly team into the then new Sydney Premiership Competition. This materialised in 1906 when Manly (and merge of the Federals and Manly clubs) was invited to join the premiership. Frank Row was elected as the first Chairman (of selectors) of the new "District" club in the same year and was honour with life membership of the club in 1909. The Wallabies paid tribute to our first "Captain" by visiting his grave site in Manly before opening game of the Loins tour of 2013. Tom Richards, a key member of the Wallabies team that first toured the UK in 1908, who joined the Manly Club in 1911. It is after Richards that the trophy for matches played between the British and Irish Lions and the Australian Wallabies is named the "Tom Richards Cup".

Robert Shute was playing for Sydney University Rugby Club in a match at Manly Oval in June 1922. He was involved in a heavy collision and died in hospital days later on 6 June 1922. His name was given to the perpetual trophy, the Shute Shield, contested by Sydney's first-grade sides.

On 5 June 1933 a match at Manly Oval between Victoria and NSW was won by Victoria 14–8, its first victory over NSW in NSW. The attendance was a record for Manly Oval, estimated at over 10,000. This was matched when a crowd of 10,000 watched Manly defeat Randwick 5–0 in their match on 21 May 1949. Of the more than 60 Wallabies who have come from Manly, nine have captained the international rugby team: Frank Row (1899), Edward Thorn (1922), Robert Loudon (1923), Sydney Malcolm (1927), Alexander Ross (1933), Ronald Walden (1936), Steve Williams (1980), George Smith (2007) and Michael Hooper (2014).

Manly adopted a royal blue jersey in 1923 and became known as the Manly Blues. In 1997, Manly RUFC adopted the name the "Marlins". This has become a well-known rugby brand in the grade competition and globally. Manly Oval continues to be the Marlins home ground. The Marlins enjoy a home crowd of up to 7,000 fans at home games. The atmosphere at Manly Oval - "The Village Green" is unique, with a fun, family atmosphere mixed with a passion and tribalism experienced nowhere else in the region.

Tennis

Formed in 1884 and one of the oldest tennis clubs in NSW, the Manly Lawn Tennis Club played under the auspices of the NSW lawn tennis Association in July 1893, first competed in the NSW Lawn Tennis Association's Badge Competition in 1898 and continues on its original site until today. The Badge competition is the oldest tennis competition in the Sydney region and currently involves clubs from across the Greater Sydney Region.

"As early as May 1884" Violet Robey, was the Hon Sec of the Club. It was unusual for a woman in these days to hold the position of Hon. Secretary as it was usually reserved for the male domain". Of particular significance beyond Manly is the annual Manly Seaside Tennis Championship. Dating back to the early 1930s, this competition played on Manly's lawn courts between 26 and 31 December was the first tournament in the Australian tennis calendar and served as an important lead in to the Australian Open championships and in preparation for the Davis Cup. The Seaside Championship is still going strong and is an important part of the Australian satellite tennis circuit.

Since 1933 "Australia's top and aspiring young players come to Manly to compete in the Gold event alongside players from all over the world in the hope to take out the major prize and have their name on the honour board alongside greats of the past". Winners of note include the Australian greats Frank Sedgman, John Bromwich, Ken Rosewall, Lew Hoad, Neil Fraser, Fred Stolle, Rod Laver and Martin Mulligan, who in 1976/7 went on to win the Australian Open in the same year. As part of Australia's 150th anniversary celebrations in 1938, an exhibition tennis match was played at Ivanhoe Park between members of Australia's Davis Cup team.

In 1953 Australia's winning Davis Cup team of Rex Hartwig, Mervyn Rose, Lew Hoad and Ken Rosewall (the latter two then teenagers) played at Manly before going on to gain an unexpected win over a much more experienced US team.

On 14 November 1961 an article on the front page of the Manly Daily was titled "Manly the Mecca of many overseas, national & local tennis stars for championships" and on 28 December 1963, the paper highlighted participation not only by Australian Davis Cup team members, but also members of "Great Britain's Davis Cup squad Mike Sangster, Rod Taylor, Stanley Matthews jnr., and Graham Stillwell".

Among great women players to win the Manly Seaside championship are Evonne Goolagong, Margaret Court-Smith and Althea Gibson (from USA), all of whom went on to become Wimbledon Singles champions - Gibson in 1974 after playing at Manly, as well as Lesley (Turner) Bowrey, Jan Lehane, Madonna Schacht, Christine O'Neil and Dianne Fromholtz. More recently young internationals Jordan Thompson and Mathew Barton have been participants.

Lawn Bowls

The Manly Bowling Club was formed in 1894, with games involving other clubs existing at that time (Sydney, Strathfield, St Leonards, Balmain -formed in 1880 and now the oldest club in NSW, Waverley, Erskineville, Victoria Park and Annandale). "By early November 1898 the bowlers were using a rink placed at their disposal by the Manly Lawn Tennis Club in Ivanhoe Park. And later that month Manly council accepted an offer by the bowlers to pay 25 pounds a year to use a four-rink green in Ivanhoe Park after the council had formed and fenced the area at a cost of 50 pounds".

By March 1899 the Manly Bowling Club was playing on its own greens and its new pavilion was opened in November 1899. In August 1900 the club asked Manly council for more land in Ivanhoe Park, which council granted, and in January 1902 the club was able to celebrate the recent extensive additions to its clubhouse. By 1910 the club had three greens. In 1921 the original clubhouse was modified and extended. In 1928 a cottage was built beside the clubhouse as the residence for the Ivanhoe Park caretaker. On 12 April 1958 a new two storey clubhouse was opened. Manly Bowling is currently owned by the Mounties group, which also owns Harbord Diggers.

Hockey

Hockey was played regularly at Ivanhoe Park from the turn of the 20th century. Unusually, this included mixed teams. In 1932 the Manly Ladies' Hockey Club applied to use the small room under the Pavilion at Manly Oval as a Committee Room and asked that it be connected to the electric light supply. In April 1946 Ivanhoe Park was the venue for an NZ Army versus Metropolis match. It is uncertain when hockey relocated from Ivanhoe Park.

Croquet

Croquet NSW records that "Croquet was played on a few private lawns in Sydney, NSW, just before the turn of the century and, by 1910, at least 7 clubs had been formed, some of which are still operating in 2011. The Croquet Association of NSW was probably formed in about 1906 and conducted its first tournament on the Sydney Cricket Ground in 1907"7, several years after the Manly Croquet Club formed. Research by Dr Andrew Morrison RFD, SC, current president of the Manly Croquet Club, derived from newspaper articles and club records, indicates that the club was formed in 1901 and began playing in Ivanhoe Park grounds in 1903.

The club appears to have played initially "upon the bowler's green". This appears to make Manly Croquet Club the oldest surviving (croquet) club in NSW." In 1903 arrangements were made for the Croquet Club to share Manly Oval with the cricket, football and lawn tennis clubs. By 1905 the club had built a pavilion on land opposite the Post Office. The Croquet Club occupied this site until 1967, when "with Council assistance (it) transferred from Ivanhoe Park to Keirle Park in 1967, where it remains."

The Manly Croquet Club was an active important sporting club in the early history of Ivanhoe Park and the Manly community. Early illustrations in the current clubhouse show croquet dress at 6 different dates starting in 1863. (Note: When the Sydney Morning Herald reported croquet being played in several private greens in Manly.) The centenary history contains a photograph of six elegantly attired ladies playing croquet on the tennis club lawns c. 1901. The club centenary history evidences many events of the Club being an active and significant participant in the heritage of croquet in NSW. This ranges from its participation and victories in metropolitan and state tournament, its members representing the State in national tournaments and the club hosting international players.

Cycling

The Oval had undergone considerable modifications and improvements over the years and annual bicycle races took place at the oval from 1887, 1888 and 1889. In 1928 a banked cycle track was constructed, though after a few years it was removed in 1932–33, enabling restoration of the oval to its original shape.

Running

Manly Oval was the location for the second (and subsequent) Manly Marathon Road Race from 1911. This successful race was a fundraiser for local charities. On a track that was heavy after recent rain, John Treloar equalled the Australian record for the 100 yards, in 9.6 seconds, on 19 March 1947. He repeated the feat the following year, on 29 January 1948, the same day Herb McKenley of Jamaica set an Australian All-comers record of 31.5 seconds for the 300 yards, beating the previous mark of 31.8 seconds. In the lead-up to the 1954 international event in Finland in which John Landy became only the second man to achieve a sub-4-minute mile run, in the world record time of 3.57.9, Landy broke the NSW All-comers' record for the 1500 metres, running 3.57.6 in an event at Manly Oval. It is still used regularly for school athletic carnivals.

=== Public visitation and events ===
Ivanhoe Park, with its "gardenesque" setting, traditional "village green" oval, and rich diversity of native and planted tree species, demonstrates important aesthetic characteristics and a high degree of creative achievement. It is one of only very few intact and original such parks remaining in New South Wales today. Ivanhoe Park, with its long history of combining a passive recreational "pleasure garden" park and a traditional "village green" sporting venue, is important in demonstrating the principal characteristics of a Victorian-era park adapted to the Australian setting. To this are added the special features brought through a War Memorial Garden and a Botanic Garden, making the whole area a place that aspires to take a higher and broader place in Australian life in one of the major tourist destinations in New South Wales.

The hotel located in Ivanhoe Park, the Ivanhoe Park Hotel, was put up for sale in October 1883, being described in part as "a popular resort for private families and the general public by reason of the attractive large dancing pavilion and spacious recreation grounds for cricket, football, quoits and all other innocent healthy outdoor amusements. This favourite property is patronised by many thousands of people on public holidays." and " the hotel is a commodious building, conveniently arranged for the reception of families, so many of whom make their annual visit for health and pleasure to Manly Beach, the premier marine suburb of our colony."

The importance to NSW and Australia of Manly, including Ivanhoe Park, was highlighted in the Depression years of the 1890s. With two ferry companies competing and fares low, the following passenger numbers to Manly were recorded: Boxing Day 1893 - 20,000, New Years Day 1894 - 12,000, March 1894 - 15,000, 1896 Total 1,400,000.

Thus, not only was Manly and its attractions (including Ivanhoe Park) of significance for residents and visitors enjoying the park, but also for the value of maritime passenger trade on Sydney Harbour. On 28 June 1897 celebrations were held in the grounds to commemorate the record reign of Queen Victoria in July. Commemorative tree planting took place on the site of the old Ivanhoe Park pavilion in the afternoon and in the evening after a procession from the wharf, 3000 people attended the festivities, many coming from Sydney, Narrabeen and the district. So much had ferry visitor numbers grown from Sydney and NSW, that by 1910 they hit 3 million per annum. So valuable to the ferry company was this trade, that The Port Jackson Company agreed with Manly Council to pay a 400-pounds' subsidy for the upkeep of Manly's 125 acres of public reserves.

Manly/Ivanhoe Park was the centre of regional community events. This includes WW1 fundraising events such as Queen of Manly appeal of 1915. The winner was crowned in an elaborate coronation ceremony held on Manly Oval on 4 December 1915 and watch by over 5,000 people. The ceremony followed a procession through the streets led by the Sydney Lancers and the Manly Band, with heralds and trumpeters. A 1920s campaign by the Chamber of Commerce saw the beginning of decades of visitation by country people for their annual vacation. Curby describes a tour of country centres, promoting the slogan "the summer call - Manly for all".

In 1945, following VJ Day and the cessation of hostilities, Manly Council decided to hold a party for all the schoolchildren in Manly to mark the end of the war. A committee was set up, and it was arranged that the party would be held on VE Day 1946. All 5,000 children from the local public and private schools were given a day's holiday. To the music of the NSW Police Band, the children marched along the Corso into Sydney Road, then onto Manly Oval. The compere, Harry Croot, conducted community singing, and comedian Russ Garling entertained. Following the inevitable speeches, each of the children was presented with a specially-struck medal. The medal was designed free of charge by Mr L Roy Davies of Balgowlah, an art teacher at the Technical College, who incorporated ideas suggested by the committee. The council had the satisfaction of knowing that their medals, designed by Angus and Coote, were issued before a similar medallion was agreed on by the government.

That the "village green" oval continues as the venue for the annual Christmas Carols and is used regularly by the public for activities such as community soccer on Sunday afternoons, as a playground for a local school, and for athletics training and school athletics carnivals, emphasizes that the oval is where the community comes together for recreation and celebrations, and has done so for nearly 150 years.

=== Tramway ===
After almost a decade of representations to parliament, it was announced on Christmas Eve 1908 that parliament had agreed to the construction of a tramway from the Spit to Manly. By April 1909 survey of the route (via the western and northern edge of the Park) was completed, providing another important connection of the Park to visitors. On 9 January 1911 the service commenced operations. The service closed in 1939. The tramline from Manly to the Spit left Manly via Raglan Street, entering Ivanhoe Park near the entrance to the Bowling Club, and then formed a reserved track curving around the north east corner of the Park as a passing loop or duplication. The site of the Loop survives at the northern end of Park Avenue, up which the original line continued until it reached Sydney Road. The benched track route along the northern edge of Ivanhoe Park is one element of the local heritage listing of the Park.

=== Memorials ===
Pursuant to a decision of Manly Council on 19 May 1925, the Merrett Memorial Gateway, consisting of sandstone supports with a wrought iron archway and gates, was built. On 3 July 1927 the ornate entrance to Manly Oval in Ivanhoe Park was officially opened, by Commander Lowther ADC, representing the Governor-General of Australia, commemorating one of Manly's most respected sporting identities, 1924 Australian Olympic team manager Ossie Merrett, were officially opened. Ossie Merrett was known as "the father of amateur sport in Manly".

A public meeting was called by Mayor Scharkie in 1951 to discuss a memorial to the dead of World War II, and a second meeting resulted in the construction of a memorial garden. on 11 September 1953, the gardens of Ivanhoe Park were dedicated as the Manly War Memorial Park. This connection of Ivanhoe Park with Australia's armed services dates back to a torchlight procession from Manly Wharf to Manly Oval as part of the Boer War Patriotic Week (12-18 Feb) and a Relief of Mafeking celebration held on 30 June 1900. On 4 December 1915 a "Queen of Manly" fundraising event for the troops overseas was attended by some 4000 people, with a further 1000 lining the streets for the parade to the event. Again in 1941, Manly Oval was the venue for various recruiting rallies, the largest of which took place on 18 May, and in 1945 a large Anzac Day Commemorative Service was held for returned service men and women.

=== Manly Boy Scouts and Girl Guides ===
Within a few months of the Boy Scout movement beginning in Australia, Manly had its first troop, operating under No 1 District. The first 36 Boy Scouts at Manly were sworn in on 14 June 1909. Their Scoutmaster was Charles Foggon, who lived at Eustace Street. He was in his mid-20s and had served in a volunteer regiment and played with Manly Band. By the end of August 1909 his Manly troop numbered 58 boys, who met twice a week, and undertook bushcraft, marches and outdoor camps at Narrabeen at the weekend. Many of the Scouts subsequently served in World War I. Practically all of No 2 Patrol enlisted, for example, and their patrol leader, John Robert Skinner, was killed at Gallipoli.

The scouts have had a presence in Ivanhoe Park since 1924 when Manly Council agreed to allow the Scout and area behind Manly Oval Pavilion facing Sydney Road, where they could build a drill hall, and Governor de Chair opened the Manly Scout Hall on 19 September 1925.

Manly had one of the earliest Girl Guide Companies in NSW forming in 1921 with the first meetings held in the Presbyterian Church hall. Following the cessation of the former Ivanhoe Park Hotel use as a courthouse, the building was dismantled in 1924 and partly re-erected elsewhere in Ivanhoe Park as a Girl Guides' clubroom. This Girl Guides' clubroom was the first of its kind in New South Wales. The Clubhouse was opened on Saturday 15 November 1924 by Lady De Chair the Governor's wife. This hall was estimated to cost A£425. In 1935 Lady Isaacs opened the extensions to the hall.

In 1934 the annual Manly-Warringah Boy Scout Association's annual corroboree was held at Manly Oval, attended by over 100 boys from all over Sydney. In the 1930s a Patrol leader of 2 November Manly Scouts was Roden Cutler, who became a Victoria Cross recipient, Governor of NSW and Chief Scout of Australia. In 1962 the council approved a A£50,000 redevelopment at the oval, this included a new Girl Guides and kindergarten building in Ivanhoe Park. The current Scout Hall was erected in July 1973 and the old hall was demolished. This scout hall was damaged by fire in 1994.

The Guides left Ivanhoe Park when Manly District Girl Guides closed on 1 July 2002. The new unit is the Harbord/Freshwater Girl Guides that meets in Freshwater. Three honoured guides from Manly are Merle Deer AM (Guide representative to the National Council of Women), Gladys Eastick MBE (for Guide service in Australia, Papua New Guinea and Europe) and Mrs WC (Barbara) Wentworth (State Commissioner, Board for Far West Children's Homes and Outward Bound).

=== Australian Air League's Manly Squadron ===
The Australian Air League, a national civilian operated aviation youth organisation was founded in Manly in 1934 by George H Townsend Robey. This aviation club was set up as an alternative to Scouts and Guides. Although located at Lagoon Reserve the cadets early years of aeronautic training were held at the Sporting Union clubrooms at Manly Oval. The squadron has been based at Hinkler Park, Manly since 1950 and continues there today.

== Description ==
The 4.58-hectare (11-acre) Ivanhoe Park (including Manly Oval) cultural landscape consists of two distinct areas; the passive recreation area of Ivanhoe Park Botanic Gardens, and the active sport and recreation facilities of Manly Oval (the "Village Green"), tennis courts and lawn bowling greens. Along the western and northern edge of the park is a former tramway corridor.

The gardens rise westwards in the park and contain sandstone outcrops and overhangs, small open lawns, majestic and rare trees, exotic under-plantings, a scout hall (1973), child care centre (1962), and a War Memorial monument and lawn (1953). The gardens were dedicated as the Manly War Memorial Park in 1953. Along the western and northern edge of the park is the former tramway corridor. Its charm is due to the expansive lawns, and natural and heritage values. The gardens provide a quiet space away from the busy pace of Manly. The eastern section is on low land, (a former swamp) and contains the Lawn Bowls clubhouse, outbuildings and greens, the "Village Green" of Manly Oval surrounded by a picket fence, grandstand and clubhouse (2002) with memorial gateway (1927), Manly Lawn Tennis clubhouse with 6 tennis courts lined by mature Melalaucas, and the park entrance - a former croquet lawn now planted with a variety of trees and shrubs and containing a number of small memorial plaques. This area is the sport and community hub of Manly and region.

=== Plantings ===
Trees

- Agonis flexuosa, peppermint / willow myrtle, W. Australia (large old tree in the childcare centre courtyard)
- Alectryon coriaceus, beach bird's eye, E.Australia (upper NW of park)
- Allocasuarina torulosa, forest oak, E.Australia (a few on upper rocks, in SW)
- Alnus jorullensis, evergreen alder, Mexico (near war memorial)
- Araucaria bidwillii, bunya-bunya pine, SE & C. Qld.
- A.cunninghamii, hoop / Moreton Bay pine, (4), N.NSW/SE.Qld
- A.heterophylla, Norfolk Island pines (4: 3 in NE near Sulman Church/oval), Norfolk Island
- Archontophoenix cunninghamiana, piccabeen / bungalow palm, E. Australia (several)
- Brachychiton acerifolium, Illawarra flame tree, E.Australia (several, young/maturing)
- Chrysophyllum imperiale, Empress tree, Brazil [very rare anywhere outside Royal Botanic Garden, Sydney, which has a whopper from 1868](E of the war memorial)
- Cinnamommum oliveri, Oliver's sassafras/cinnamon-/camphor-wood, E.Australia
- Cordyline australis, ti kouka / NZ cabbage tree, New Zealand (2: one in front of gardener's cottage)
- Cyathea australis/cooperi, rough/scaly tree fern, E. Australia (several, regenerating, upper gully)
- Davidsonia pruriens ssp.pruriens, Davidson's plum, N.Queensland
- Elaeocarpus grandis, blue marble/quandong, E.Australia (fruiting)
- Ficus coronata, sandpaper fig, E.Australia (several, regenerating, in upper W)
- F.macrophylla, Moreton Bay fig, E.Australia
- F.microcarpa "Hillii", Hill's fig, Qld/garden origin (2, E of child care centre: upper W of park)
- F.rubiginosa, Port Jackson / rusty fig, E.Australia
- F.virens var. virens / var. sublanceolata, white/sour fig, E.Australia (2)
- Flindersia bennetiana /F.schottiana, Bennet's / bumpy ash/cudgerie, Southern silver ash, NSW/Qld.
- Glochidion ferdinandii, cheese tree, E.Australia (several, regenerating, esp. on upper rocks)
- Hicksbeachia pinnatifolia, red bopplenut/monkey nut/ ivory silky oak, E.Australia
- Homolanthus populnifolius, bleeding heart / native poplar, E.Australia
- Howea fosteriana, Lord Howe Island palms, L.H.Island (several)
- Lagerstroemia indica cv., crepe myrtle, India/garden origin (newish street trees to SW, uphill)
- Lepiderema pulchella, fine leaved tuckeroo, E.Australia (young, fruiting)
- Livistona australis, cabbage tree palm, E.Australia
- Lophostemon confertus, brush box, N.NSW/S. Qld. (several, some large)
- Magnolia grandiflora, Southern /evergreen magnolia/bull bay, S. USA (under bunya pine)
- Melaleuca bracteata, honey bracelet myrtle, E.Australia
- M.quinquenervia, paperbarks, E. Australia (loose avenue on SW upper side /street, large hedge along tennis courts)
- Polyscias sambucifolia, elderberry panax/basswood, E. Australia
- Populus deltoides, cottonwood, USA (2 large, E of scout hall)
- Schizolobium parahyba, Brazilian fern/tower tree, Brazil (rare)
- Sloanea australis, maiden's blush, E. Australia (young, flowering)
- Toona ciliata, red cedar, E.Australia (2: large one in gully in upper W; small one E of childcare centre)
- Washingtonia robusta, desert fan palm/skyduster palm, California (several)
- Waterhousea floribunda, weeping lily pilly, NSW/Qld., near war memorial

=== Shrubs ===
- Akocanthera oppositifolia, poison bush, Sth.Africa
- Alyxia buxifolia, sea box, W., S. & SE. Australia (rare/unusual - fruiting prolifically)
- Bauhinia galpinii, red butterfly bush/orchid bush, Australasia/garden origin (near grandstand)
- Carica papaya cv., paw paw, S. America
- Ceratopetalum gummiferum, NSW Christmas bush, E.Australia
- Chamaedorea sp., clumping palm, Asia/Australia
- Cordyline petiolaris, broad-leaved cabbage tree, E.Australia
- C.stricta, forest cabbage tree, E.Australia
- Cycas revoluta, sago palm/cycad, Japan/China (road reserve to SW, near kerb)
- Dracaena marginalis, Asia/garden origin (near bowling club in beds)
- Hibiscus rosa-sinensis cv.s, Chinese hibiscus cultivars, (hedged, flanking bowling club green)
- Melicope (syn.Euodia) elleryana, pink-flowered doughwood, E.Australia
- Musa ensete / cv., fruiting banana (near gardener's cottage)
- Odontonema cuspidatum, Cardinal's crest/scarlet fire spike, Mexico, C.America
- Rosmarinus officinalis, rosemary, Mediterranean (hedges around war memorial)
- Strelitzia nicolai, bird-of-paradise 'tree'(white flowers), Sth.Africa
- Telopea speciosissima, NSW waratah, NSW, (young, near SW corner gate entry)
- Viburnum odoratissimum, China

=== Groundcover plants ===
- Aechmea spp./cv.s, bromeliads
- Asplenium australasicum, birds-nest fern, E.Australia
- Aspidistra elatior, cast iron plant, Asia
- Billbergia spp./cv.s, bromeliads
- Clivia miniata, kaffir lilies, Sth.Africa
- Monstera deliciosa, fruit salad plant, S. America
- Philodendron "Xanadu", S. America/garden origin
- P.selloum, S. America (near gardener's cottage)
- Strelitzia reginae, bird-of-paradise flower, Sth.Africa
- Tradescantia (syn.Setcreasea) pallida, purple heart/wandering Jew, Mexico.

=== Condition ===
As at 21 November 2018, The defining fabric of Ivanhoe Park as a "gardenesque" setting with its curving paths, defined garden beds and cultural plantings of exotic trees retains the essential features of the Park's early design. Alongside this exists the "village green" sporting oval with its white picket fence, which although enhanced from time to time, retains the character and ambience of a "village green" in the English tradition. Based on these features, the place is considered to be in good condition.

Numerous structures have come and gone from Ivanhoe Park over the past 140–150 years, along with landscaping and ground works directed to improving the area as a place of passive and active recreation. Despite these changes, the integrity of the area is good. It retains its fundamental form as a "village green" located within a larger Victorian era "gardenesque" park with shady lawns, indigenous and introduced trees and other plantings well suited to the passive recreational activities for which it was originally reserved.

The potential aboriginal archaeology may lie under the landscaping noted above.

=== Modifications and dates ===
Most of the changes made to Ivanhoe Park and its "village green" oval throughout the existence of the place have been landscaping and ground works aimed at improving its amenity. However, as documented by Anne Warr, some structural features have come and gone since the 1870s. Key among these are:

- 1871 erection of a large pavilion left over after the international exhibition held in Sydney and its later demolition (1893)
- 1875 erection of the Ivanhoe Park Hotel, its conversion to council chambers (1884-1909) and its subsequent relocation (1924).
- 1880 draining of the low-lying land
- 1885 further drainage, levelling of park, top dressing, planting of shrubs and trees, lamp lighting, forming of cricket ground, bicycle track and picket fence. Extension of park (to include what is now eastern end of the oval, tennis courts and Belgrave St entrance).
- 1899 bowling greens and pavilion built
- 1902 picket fence enclosed playing field, tennis courts separated from oval, additions to bowling clubhouse
- 1905 Croquet club pavilion built
- 1909 surveying and preparation of the tram route from The Spit to Manly, including excavation in the Raglan St area of Ivanhoe Park. The benched track route is one element of local heritage listed locally in association with Ivanhoe Park. The tram operated from January 1911- October 1939

bowling clubhouse extended.

- 1924 removal of the Old Court House building, which then presented an opportunity to enlarge the oval area, Guides clubroom and Manly Sports Union clubroom built from court house materials, tennis pavilion built,
- 1925 Scout drill hall opened
- 1927 Merritt Memorial Gates installed.
- 1928 construction of a banked cycle track, removed in 1932–33, enabling restoration of the oval to its original shape, construction of Caretaker's Cottage
- 1935 Tennis club two-storey clubhouse built
- 1939 tram loop closed.
- 1958 Bowling club two-storey clubhouse built
- 1962 construction of new grandstand and seating, Girl Guides hall and baby care entre (demolition of old guide hall)
- 1967 Removal of croquet clubhouse and lawns, park entrance redesigned
- 1973 construction of two storey Scout Hall (demolition of old scout hall)
- 1998 demolition of the old grandstand, after it was declared unsafe
- 2002 opening of a new grandstand.

=== Further information ===
Northern Beaches Council endorsed the Ivanhoe Park Landscape Master Plan in Aug 2017 with work to be carried out from the end of 2018.

== Heritage listing ==
As at 15 February 2019, Ivanhoe Park (including Manly Oval) cultural landscape, is important in the course of New South Wales cultural history combining a "pleasure garden" park, a traditional "village green" community and sporting venue, and a passive recreational garden, demonstrating the principal characteristics of a Victorian-era park adapted to the Australian setting. This landscape is unique within New South Wales as a place with a combined history of Aboriginal heritage and 150 years of recreation, sport and community use.

With its natural land formation of sandstone outcrops and overhangs and watercourse flowing into what was a low-lying swamp area, the site has high potential to reveal tangible Aboriginal heritage of the Kay-ye-my people, and with its close proximity to three identified aboriginal heritage sites the site relates to intangible cultural heritage of the local Aboriginal people.

Ivanhoe Park (including Manly Oval) cultural landscape demonstrates the importance of public recreation and pleasure grounds in the development of townships remote from Sydney and the importance of sport, and the establishment of sporting venues in the ongoing development of community life in Australia.

Ivanhoe Park is one of the few planned colonial era "pleasure grounds" surviving in New South Wales. Since its establishment in the 1860s Ivanhoe Park has been an important destination for pleasure and healthy recreation for vast numbers of visitors to Manly from Sydney and beyond. The "village green" oval and Ivanhoe Park pavilion became the centre of sporting and community functions and events, not just for Manly residents but for the region and NSW.

Ivanhoe Park (including Manly Oval) cultural landscape has significant association with several sporting organisations in NSW, the Scouts, Girl Guides, Australian Air League and many leaders of public life in NSW. These include HG Smith (the 'father of Manly'), Charles Lawrence and the first Australian Aboriginal cricket team (1866–68), Thomas Rowe (architect and first mayor of Manly), Sir Henry Parkes, (local MP and Premier of NSW), Sir Roden Cutler (NSW Governor and Chief Scout of Australia), Merle Deer AM (Guide representative to the National Council of Women), Gladys Eastick MBE (Guide service in Australia, Papua New Guinea and Europe) and Mrs WC (Barbara) Wentworth (Guide State Commissioner), Ossie Merritt (Manager of the 1924 Australian Olympic Team), Keith Miller (test cricket great) and Frank Row and Tom Richards (Rugby Union legends) as well as many Australian international sports people.

Ivanhoe Park (including Manly Oval) cultural landscape was the site of Australia's first and highly successful Wildflower Shows (1881-1899) influencing similar shows and interest in native wildflowers throughout Australia.

Ivanhoe Park (including Manly Oval) cultural landscape, is a diverse and complex site with its natural sandstone outcrops and watercourse, Victorian "gardenesque" plantings, rich diversity of native and planted tree species, war memorial garden, traditional "village green" oval, and sporting complex. Combined, it demonstrates an unusual yet pleasing aesthetic.

Ivanhoe Park cultural landscape was listed on the New South Wales State Heritage Register on 23 August 2019 having satisfied the following criteria.

The place is important in demonstrating the course, or pattern, of cultural or natural history in New South Wales.

Ivanhoe Park (including Manly Oval) cultural landscape is of state significance as an exceptional example of an important aboriginal site that upon European settlement saw the development of "pleasure grounds" and "watering hole" for the people of and visitors to Sydney. It has continued to be an important place of recreation to this day for people in and visitors to Manly.

Ivanhoe Park is of exceptional significance in the course of NSW cultural history because: The upper level of Ivanhoe park is set on steep slopes of sandstone with several sandstone outcrops and overhangs. Flowing down these slopes between the outcrops is a small watercourse. It is highly likely these outcrops, the watercourse and swamp were regular sites of for the Kay-ye-my and other local Aboriginal people, holding intangible values of an aboriginal site in an urban setting. The park sits between two identified aboriginal outcrop sites, 300m south and 500 north, with rock shelters, rock art and shell middens. 1 km to the south are more rock engravings, shell middens and a burial site. With its close proximity to three identified aboriginal heritage sites, the site relates to intangible cultural heritage of the local Aboriginal people and life in the area to be known as Manly.

Ivanhoe Park (including Manly Oval) cultural landscape is a rare demonstration of the development of townships remote from Sydney through the building of public recreation and pleasure grounds. Modelled on European "watering places" or resorts, by the private developer M Henry Gilbert Smith, Manly, with Ivanhoe Park as a centrepiece, offered those seeking relaxation and leisure opportunities "a pleasure ground admirably adapted for the enjoyment of visitors. It is spacious, sheltered and shaded with numerous treeThe dancing pavilion...affords almost unlimited space... Adjoining this is an octagonal pavilion...used as a refreshment room". Prior to the approval of swimming during daylight hours in the first decade of the 1900s, visitors from across Sydney Harbour flocked to Manly and Ivanhoe Park for a diversity of outdoor activities, including dancing, rambling, picnics, eating and drinking. The introduction of the Saturday half holiday in the 1890s and more competitive prices for ferry travel saw growth in the importance of Manly and its green open space to visitors to and from Sydney.

At the same time, the importance of sporting activities as an integral part of Australian recreation and community identity was also growing. From the late 1860s onwards, Ivanhoe Park (aka Manly Park, Village Green and Manly Oval) became a focus for local, state and international sporting events. From the 1880s, its classic "village green" cricket and rugby ground encircled by a white picket fence, is one of only a few such settings remaining in New South Wales. That Ivanhoe Park has maintained its continuing place in the developing pattern of both informal leisure and sport as parts of the Australian way of life over almost 150 years is culturally significant.

Ivanhoe Park has seen Manly as the earliest establishment of several sporting and community organisations in NSW and demonstrates the importance of sport and the integral role of youth groups to community development in 19th and early 20th century Australia. These include cricket, rugby, tennis, lawn bowls, croquet, hockey, cycling, Girl Guides, Boy Scouts, and the Australian Air League - most of which are still active in Ivanhoe Park.

Soon after the park was purchased in 1883 by the NSW Government for the people of NSW the Manly Council commenced landscaping, shrub and tree planting and enhancing the park by combining the western and eastern halves. The 1885 design remains today and demonstrates the role of a Victorian pleasure ground within a regional context and its adaptation into a public park and gardens.

As the largest venue in Manly, Ivanhoe Park has held some of the area's most important community, social and political events. It demonstrates the role of a public park as a gathering place for important social, community and political events. This includes being the venue for; Australia's first Wildflower Shows (1881-1899) influencing similar shows and interest in native wildflowers throughout Australia, a landmark speech by Sir Henry Parkes (5 Nov 1888), World War I and World War II recruitment rallies and fundraising events, NSW Scouts corroboree (1934), and the current annual Carols by Candlelight. The "village green" continues to be used regularly by the public for activities such as community soccer on Sunday afternoons, as a playground for a local school, and for athletics training and school athletics carnivals.

The gardens were dedicated as the Manly War Memorial Park in 1953 as a testament to the long relationship the park held as a centre of war time activities and memorials for not only Manly but the north harbour region.

The place has a strong or special association with a person, or group of persons, of importance of cultural or natural history of New South Wales's history.

Ivanhoe Park (including Manly Oval) cultural landscape is of state significance for its strong and special association with several leaders of public life in NSW. This includes:

- Henry Gilbert Smith, builder of the first steam ferry in Sydney, director then chairman of the Commercial Banking Co. of Sydney, government director of the Sydney Railway Co., Member of the NSW Legislative Council. Smith purchased much of Manly, created the "Brighton Estate" and developed in into a seaside resort, including the wharf, cottages, hotel, church, school, gardens, and baths. It was on his land that Ivanhoe Park was developed.
- The first Australian Aboriginal Cricket team (1867–68) and Charles Lawrence, British and New South Wales cricketer, manager of this team. Lawrence hosted the team at his Manly hotel whilst they were in Sydney and organised a cricket game for the team at Manly on the grounds that were to later be known as Ivanhoe Park, prior to their departure for England.
- Thomas Rowe, renowned NSW architect, architect founder and president of the Institute of Architects of NSW, first mayor of Manly. Rowe purchased land off HG Smith, and in 1884 sold it to the NSW government in the creation of the western half (gardens) of Ivanhoe Park.
- Frank Row, the first captain of a Wallaby international rugby team to play against a touring British team. Row was the co-founder in 1903, of the Manly Rugby Club based at Ivanhoe Park. Also eight other Wallaby captions from Manly - Edward (Ted) Thorn, Sydney Malcolm, Bob Loudon, Dr Alex Ross, Ron Walden, Steve Williams, George Smith, and Michael Hooper.
- Tom Richards, member of the Wallabies team that first toured the UK in 1908, and member of the Manly Club. The trophy for matches played between the British and Irish Lions and the Australian Wallabies is named the "Tom Richards Cup".
- Ossie Merritt, sports administrator. Merritt was chairman of the NSW Amateur Swimming Association, a member of the NSW Sports Club, an original committee member of the Council of the Surf Life Saving Association of Australia, and in the 1920s Secretary of the Australian Olympic Federation. His most recognised role was the management of the triumphant 1924 Australian Olympic team. The Merritt Memorial gates are in his honour.
- Keith Miller, Manly Cricket Club player and regarded as Australia's greatest all-rounder cricketer.
- Sir Arthur Roden Cutler, Victoria Cross recipient, Governor of NSW and Chief Scout of Australia, was a patrol leader of 2nd Manly Scouts in the 1930s at Ivanhoe Park.
- Honoured Guides from the Manly unit include Merle Deer AM (Guide representative to the National Council of Women), Gladys Eastick MBE (for service in Australia, Papua New Guinea and Europe) and Mrs WC (Barbara) Wentworth (State Commissioner).

The place is important in demonstrating aesthetic characteristics and/or a high degree of creative or technical achievement in New South Wales.

Ivanhoe Park (including Manly Oval) cultural landscape has state significance for the unusual aesthetics of a combined recreation "botanic" garden, war memorial, village green and sporting complex. Few, if any, other locations in New South Wales can boast the pleasing mix of qualities provided by Ivanhoe Park, Manly Oval and its sporting facilities.

The site's aesthetic qualities include:

- The landmark qualities that are retained despite the changes that have occurred over the 150 years since it was set aside as a "pleasure ground" for the people of New South Wales.
- The beautiful siting of the park on a high point looking east to the ocean and south to the harbour
- The Victorian "gardenesque" parkland on the upper slopes combined with the War Memorial Gardens on the lower slopes of Ivanhoe Park leading to the oval and sporting facilities, creating a cohesive recreation landscape
- The impressive range of introduced plants and trees, including the c. 1870s Norfolk Island pines and Moreton Bay figs, the extremely rare empress tree from Brazil, (east of the War Memorial) and willow myrtle (grounds of the pre-school), two magnificent red cedars, several mature hoop pines and bunya pines and a stand of broad-leaved paperbarks (on the edge of the tennis courts)
- Manly Oval, the "village green" oval, with the greenery of the park rising to the ridge behind, that creates an important vista for Manly and its beautiful setting for community and sporting events.
- Ivanhoe Park exemplifies the way the natural and cultural environment are of such importance in the character of a community.

The place has a strong or special association with a particular community or cultural group in New South Wales for social, cultural or spiritual reasons.

Ivanhoe Park (including Manly Oval) cultural landscape is of state significance for its strong and special association with several community and cultural groups in NSW. This includes:

- Cricket NSW - Manly Warringah District Cricket Club was founded in 1878 and a foundation club in the Sydney grade competition. It is the second oldest existing district cricket club in New South Wales providing 20 Australian test cricket players.
- Rugby Union NSW - Manly Rugby, with origins dating to 1883, one of the oldest clubs in NSW and providing over 60 Australian "Wallabies" players including 9 captains.
- Tennis NSW - Manly Lawn Tennis Club formed in 1884 and one of the oldest tennis clubs in NSW, continues on its original site and hosts the annual international Manly Seaside Tennis Championship
- Lawn Bowls NSW - Manly Bowling Club was formed in 1894, one of oldest clubs in NSW and sited at Ivanhoe Park since 1898.
- Croquet NSW - Manly Croquet Club, commenced in 1901 on the bowling green before having its own site in 1903 and is the oldest surviving croquet club in NSW. (Note: It moved to nearby Keirle Park in 1967.)
- Scouting NSW and Girl Guides NSW, with the Manly troop and company being one of the oldest/earliest in NSW and both setting up in Ivanhoe Park. The 1924 Girl Guides clubroom being the first purpose-built in NSW.
- Australian Air League, was commence in Manly in 1934 and the Ivanhoe Park Sporting Union clubrooms being the location for the early years of aeronautic training.

The place has potential to yield information that will contribute to an understanding of the cultural or natural history of New South Wales.

Ivanhoe Park (including Manly Oval) cultural landscape is of state significance as it has high potential of containing aboriginal cultural heritage that would contribute to further understanding of the Kay-ye-mai people. The western area, Ivanhoe Park Botanic Gardens has been assessed as being of high tangible Aboriginal heritage potential due to the surviving landscape features (sandstone features suitable for engravings, shelters, grinding grooves are present and/or land is in areas likely to contain Aboriginal archaeological material) and lack of intensive previous assessment / accessibility.

The areas surrounding Ivanhoe Park include a number of recorded Aboriginal sites. Within 300 metres (980 ft) there are three rock shelters, one with rock art and shell midden and two others with shell midden. Within 500 metres (1,600 ft) there are rock engravings and more rock shelters. Within one kilometre (0.62 mi) there are more rock engravings, shell middens and a burial site. These sites are rare within a densely populated urban setting in NSW. Together with the former swamp area (lawn bowls, Manly Oval and tennis courts), these sites indicate intangible cultural heritage practices such as burials, rituals, and cultural events as well as resources such as food, fibre, shelter and medicine. The site has regional and state significance for the tangible and intangible heritage contribution to understanding the Kay-ya-my people and the broader extent of the Guringai people north of Sydney Harbour.

The place possesses uncommon, rare or endangered aspects of the cultural or natural history of New South Wales.

Manly is unusual in the story of colonial expansion and development in that it was developed as a resort for visitors from Sydney and beyond. The Ivanhoe Park (including Manly Oval) cultural landscape lies at the centre of Manly's development as Sydney's premier tourist resort village as its "pleasure ground". Although one of several early "pleasure grounds" Ivanhoe Park differs as it was envisioned from the 1860s as an integral part of a new coastal development and has served this function for 150 years.

Ivanhoe Park (including Manly Oval) cultural landscape has state significance for the uncommon, and probably unique history and development of its landscape from aboriginal heritage through development as a "pleasure ground" to a place combining a peaceful recreation park, a village green, community and sporting facilities and events. It is the location of events important in the history of Sydney and NSW and the establishment and continuity of many of NSWs oldest sporting and community clubs. No other major park in NSW can claim such diverse cultural heritage.

The place is important in demonstrating the principal characteristics of a class of cultural or natural places/environments in New South Wales.

Ivanhoe Park (including Manly Oval) cultural landscape has State significance because it represents a Victorian era park adapted to the Australian setting and Aboriginal cultural site by combining; a traditional planned "pleasure garden" for the enjoyment and passive recreation of the people of New South Wales, a "village green" sporting venue with its lush green oval and encircling white picket fence, a series of tennis and bowling lawns, and numerous memorials.

Ivanhoe Park (including Manly Oval) cultural landscape is a rare example in NSW of a public recreation oval integrated into a "village" area and represents a continuity of community-focussed events and functions from the 1860s to today.
