= Lepiderema melanorrhachis =

Scientific classification
- Kingdom: Plantae
- Clade: Tracheophytes
- Clade: Angiosperms
- Clade: Eudicots
- Clade: Rosids
- Order: Sapindales
- Family: Sapindaceae
- Genus: Lepiderema
- Species: L. melanorrhachis

Binomial name
- Lepiderema melanorrhachis Merr. & L.M.Perry

Species of flowering plant

Lepiderema melanorrhachis is a tree in the lychee family Sapindaceae found only in Papua New Guinea. It is known from only a single collection in 1940.
