= Lepiderema papuana =

Scientific classification
- Kingdom: Plantae
- Clade: Tracheophytes
- Clade: Angiosperms
- Clade: Eudicots
- Clade: Rosids
- Order: Sapindales
- Family: Sapindaceae
- Genus: Lepiderema
- Species: L. papuana

Binomial name
- Lepiderema papuana Radlk.

Species of flowering plant

Lepiderema papuana is a tree in the lychee family Sapindaceae found only in Western New Guinea. It is the type species for Lepiderema, and is known from only a single collection.
