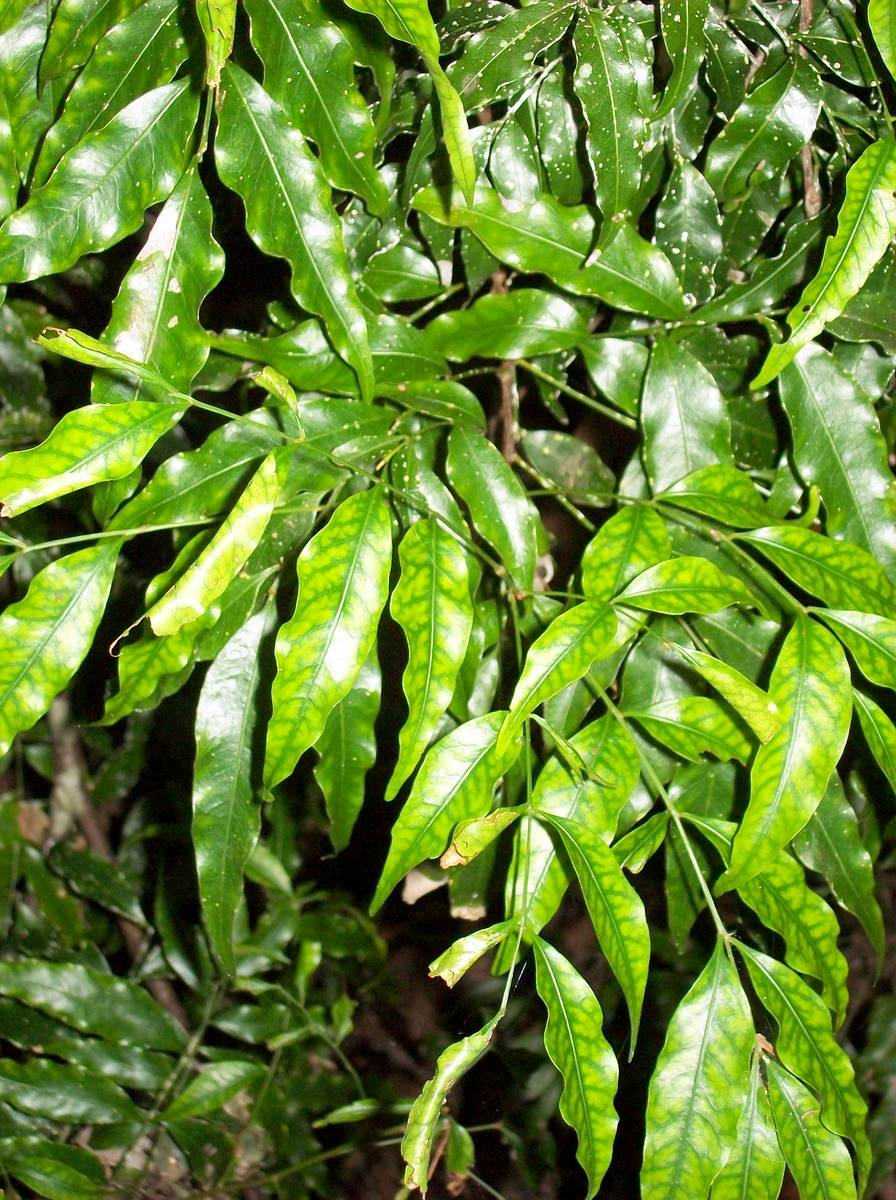
- Lepiderema pulchella

Scientific classification
- Kingdom: Plantae
- Clade: Embryophytes
- Clade: Tracheophytes
- Clade: Spermatophytes
- Clade: Angiosperms
- Clade: Eudicots
- Clade: Rosids
- Order: Sapindales
- Family: Sapindaceae
- Subfamily: Sapindoideae
- Tribe: Cupanieae
- Genus: Lepiderema; Radlk.

Type species
- Lepiderema papuana Radlk.

Species
- See text

= Lepiderema =

Genus of trees

Lepiderema is a genus of eight species of trees in the lychee family Sapindaceae native to New Guinea (2 species) and eastern Australia (6 species), plus one more from Queensland that is yet to be formally described. The type species is Lepiderema papuana.

== Description ==
Plants in this genus are shrubs or small trees that are usually monoecious, i.e. flowers are either male or female, but both will be produced by an individual plant. The leaves are alternate and compound, with an even number of opposite or sub-opposite leaflets that may have smooth or toothed edges. The petiolules (the stalks of the leaflets) are usually short and pulvinate. Inflorescences may be racemes or panicles, produced in the leaf axils or from the branches on old wood. Flowers are regular and 5-merous with 6–8 stamens, ovaries are 3-locular with one ovule per locule. The fruit are 3-locular capsules, glabrous, dehiscent, becoming woody. Seeds ellipsoid, one per locule, either fully or partly enclosed in an aril.

== Taxonomy ==
The genus was erected in 1879 by the Bavarian botanist Ludwig Adolph Timotheus Radlkofer to accommodate the newly described plant Lepiderema papuana. The genus name Lepidorema is from the Ancient Greek words lepís meaning a scale or flake, and erêmos meaning "bereft of" or without. It refers to the scale-less petals.

== Distribution and habitat ==
Plants in this genus inhabit rainforest of New Guinea and eastern Australia. The type species Lepiderema papuana is known from a single collection in Western New Guinea, likewise Lepiderema melanorrhachis is known from only one collection in Papua New Guinea. All other species are found in Queensland, with one – Lepiderema pulchella – extending into the northeastern part of New South Wales.

== Species ==
As of 24 April 2024, there are 8 species formally recognised, as follows:

- Lepiderema hirsuta S.T.Reynolds, Noah's tamarind – northeastern Queensland
- Lepiderema ixiocarpa S.T.Reynolds, Sticky lepiderema – northeastern Queensland
- Lepiderema largiflorens S.T.Reynolds – northeastern Queensland
- Lepiderema melanorrhachis Merr. & L.M.Perry – Papua New Guinea
- Lepiderema papuana Radlk. – Western New Guinea
- Lepiderema pulchella Radlk., Fine–leaved tuckeroo – northeastern New South Wales, southeastern Queensland
- Lepiderema punctulata (F.Muell.) Radlk. – central Queensland
- Lepiderema sericolignis (F.M.Bailey) Radlk., Silkwood – northeastern Queensland

In addition to the above, the following name is awaiting formal publication:

- Lepiderema sp. Impulse Creek (A.B.Pollock 73) Qld Herbarium – central Queensland
