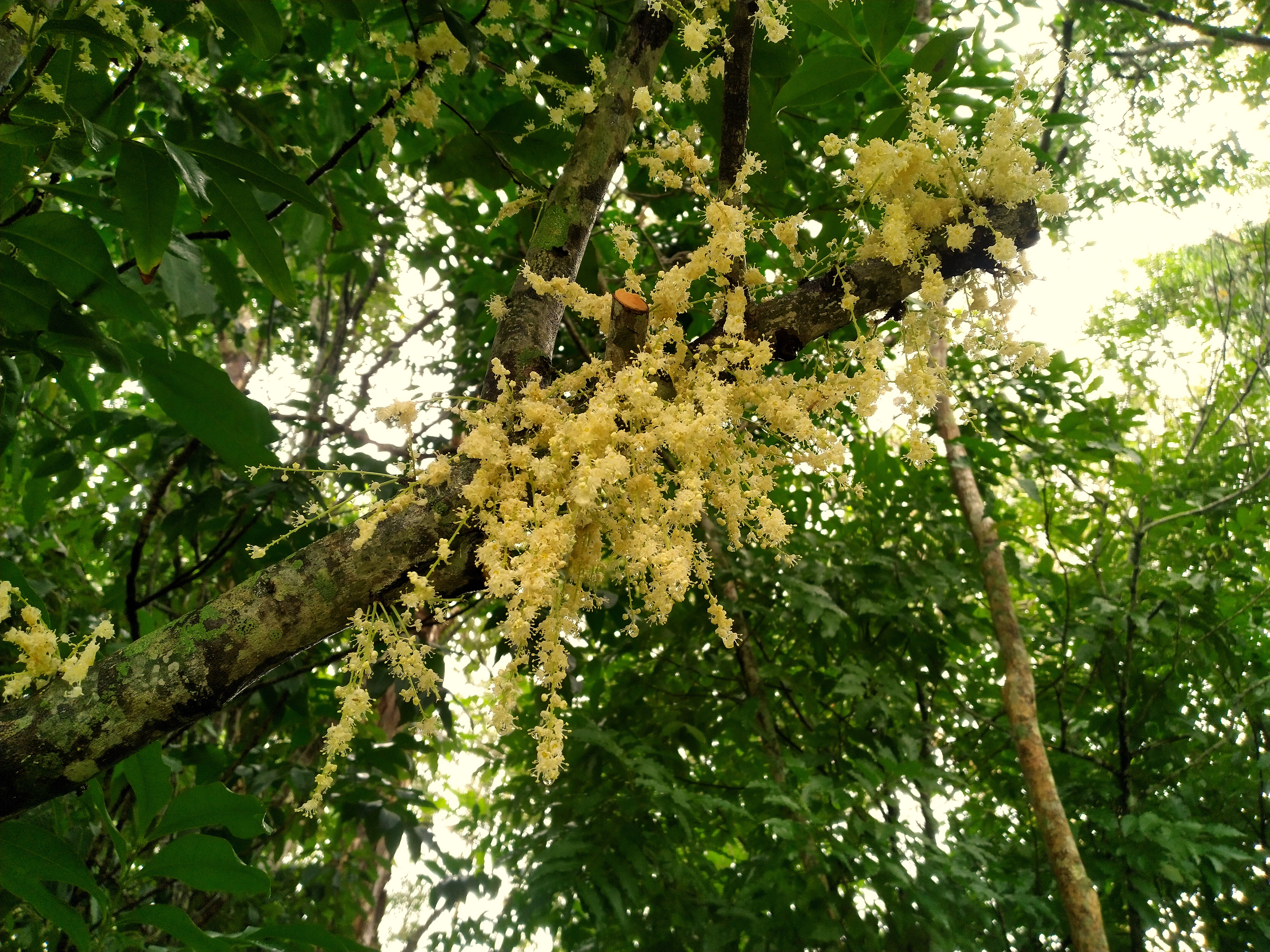
- Male plant in flower in Cairns

Conservation status
- Least Concern (NCA)

Scientific classification
- Kingdom: Plantae
- Clade: Tracheophytes
- Clade: Angiosperms
- Clade: Eudicots
- Clade: Rosids
- Order: Sapindales
- Family: Sapindaceae
- Genus: Lepiderema
- Species: L. sericolignis

Binomial name
- Lepiderema sericolignis (F.M.Bailey) Radlk.

Synonyms
- Cupania sericolignis F.M.Bailey

= Lepiderema sericolignis =

silkwood

Species of flowering plant

Lepiderema sericolignis, commonly known as silkwood, is a plant in the maple and lychee family Sapindaceae found only in the Wet Tropics bioregion of Queensland, Australia.

== Description ==
Lepiderema sericolignis is a small tree to about 4 m (13 ft) high. The compound leaves have 2, 3, or rarely 4 pairs of leaflets that are glossy green above and dull green below. The leaflets are held on very short pulvinate stems about 5 mm (0.20 in) long. They measure up to 16 cm (6.3 in) long and 6 cm (2.4 in) wide and are elliptic in outline, with between 7 and 12 pairs of lateral veins in the blades.

The inflorescences are short spikes about 4.5 cm (1.8 in) long, produced in small clusters on old wood and in the leaf axils. Flowers are either male or female, white to creamy yellow, with 5 petals and measuring about 5 mm (0.20 in) wide. The fruit is a globose, apricot/orange capsule up to 2 cm (0.79 in) long and wide, with three segments each containing a single black seed almost fully enclosed in a yellow aril. The capsules persist on the branches after ripening and dry dark brown or black.

=== Phenology ===
Flowering occurs between March and May, and fruit are ripe from August to December. (Note: Phenology information from iNaturalist is based on a total of 21 observations as at 23 April 2024. Data are shown under the "Plant phenology" tab in the referenced page.)

== Taxonomy ==
This species was first described in 1892 as Cupania sericolignis by the Australian botanist Frederick Manson Bailey. In 1924, the Bavarian botanist Ludwig Adolph Timotheus Radlkofer transferred it to the current genus Lepiderema.

=== Etymology ===
The genus name Lepidorema is from the Ancient Greek words lepís meaning a scale or flake, and erêmos meaning "bereft of" or without. It refers to the scale-less petals. The species epithet sericolignis is derived from the Ancient Greek sērikós meaning silky, and the Latin lignis meaning wood, and is a reference to the sheen of the timber.

== Distribution and habitat ==
Lepiderema sericolignis inhabits rainforest, often close to rivers or mangrove communities, from around Rossville southwards to about Ingham. The altitudinal range is from sea level to about 1,000 m (3,300 ft).

== Conservation ==
This species is listed as least concern under the Queensland Government's Nature Conservation Act. As of 23 April 2024, it has not been assessed by the International Union for Conservation of Nature (IUCN).

== Gallery ==
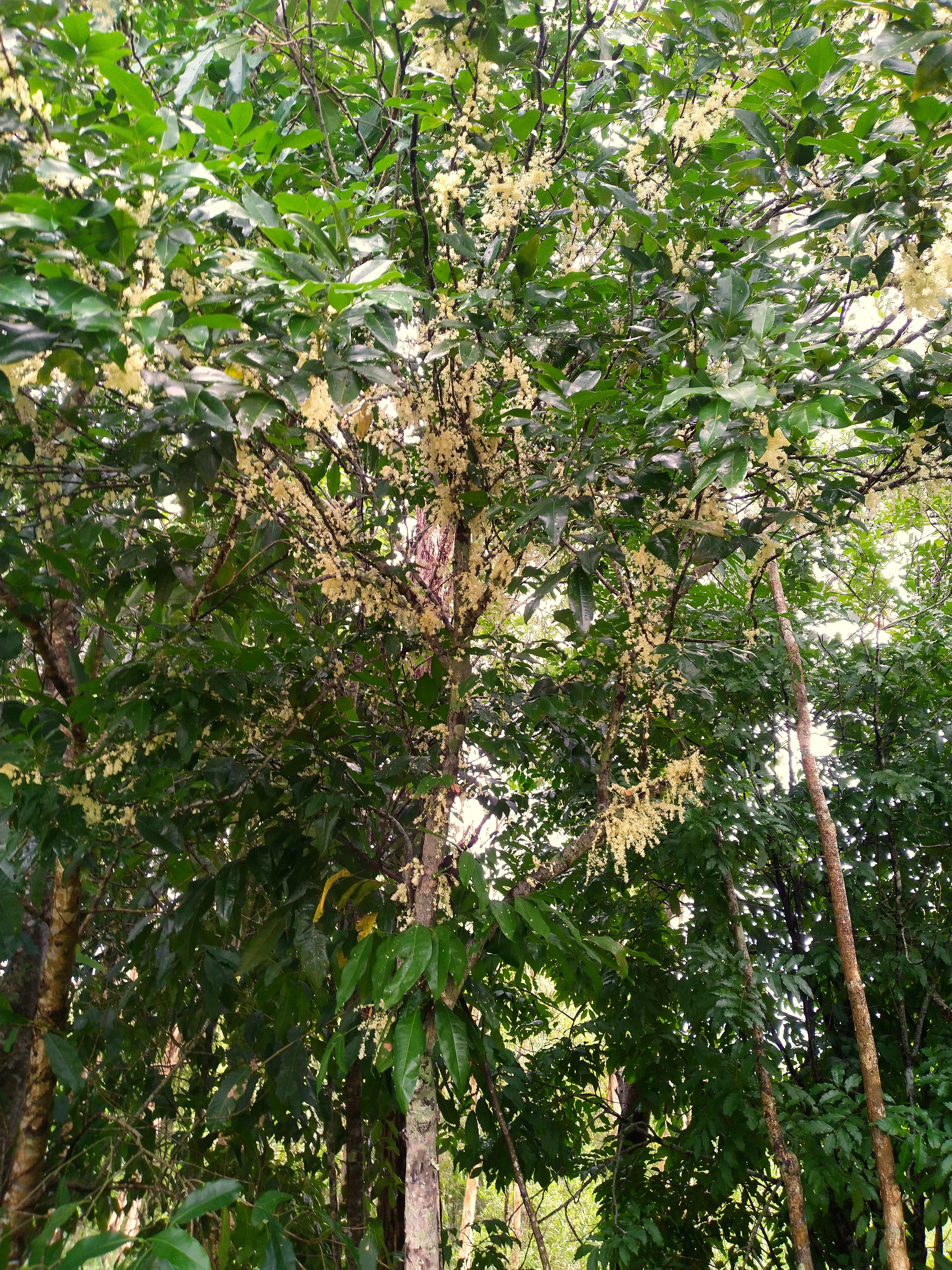
Tree in full flower

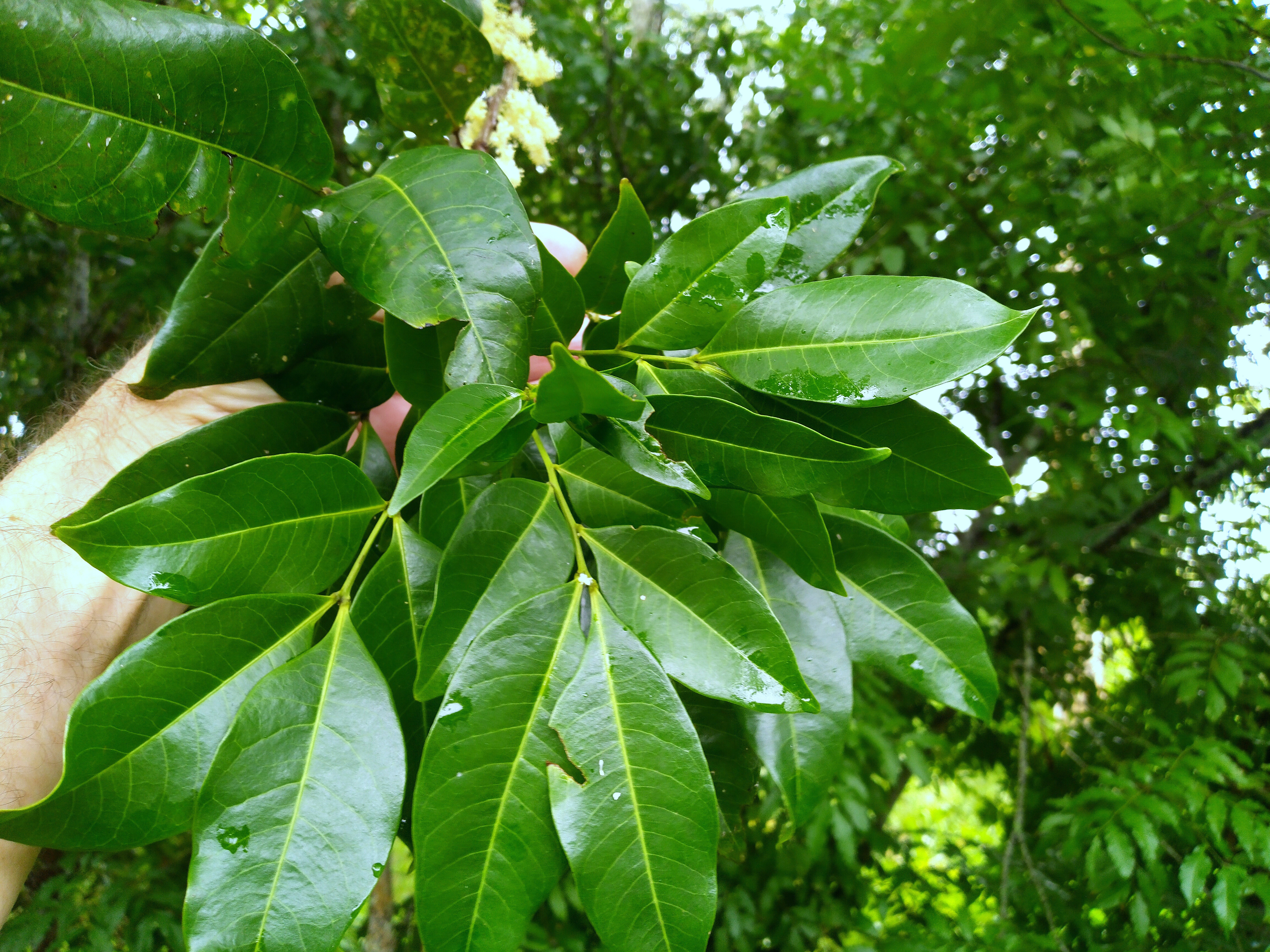
Foliage

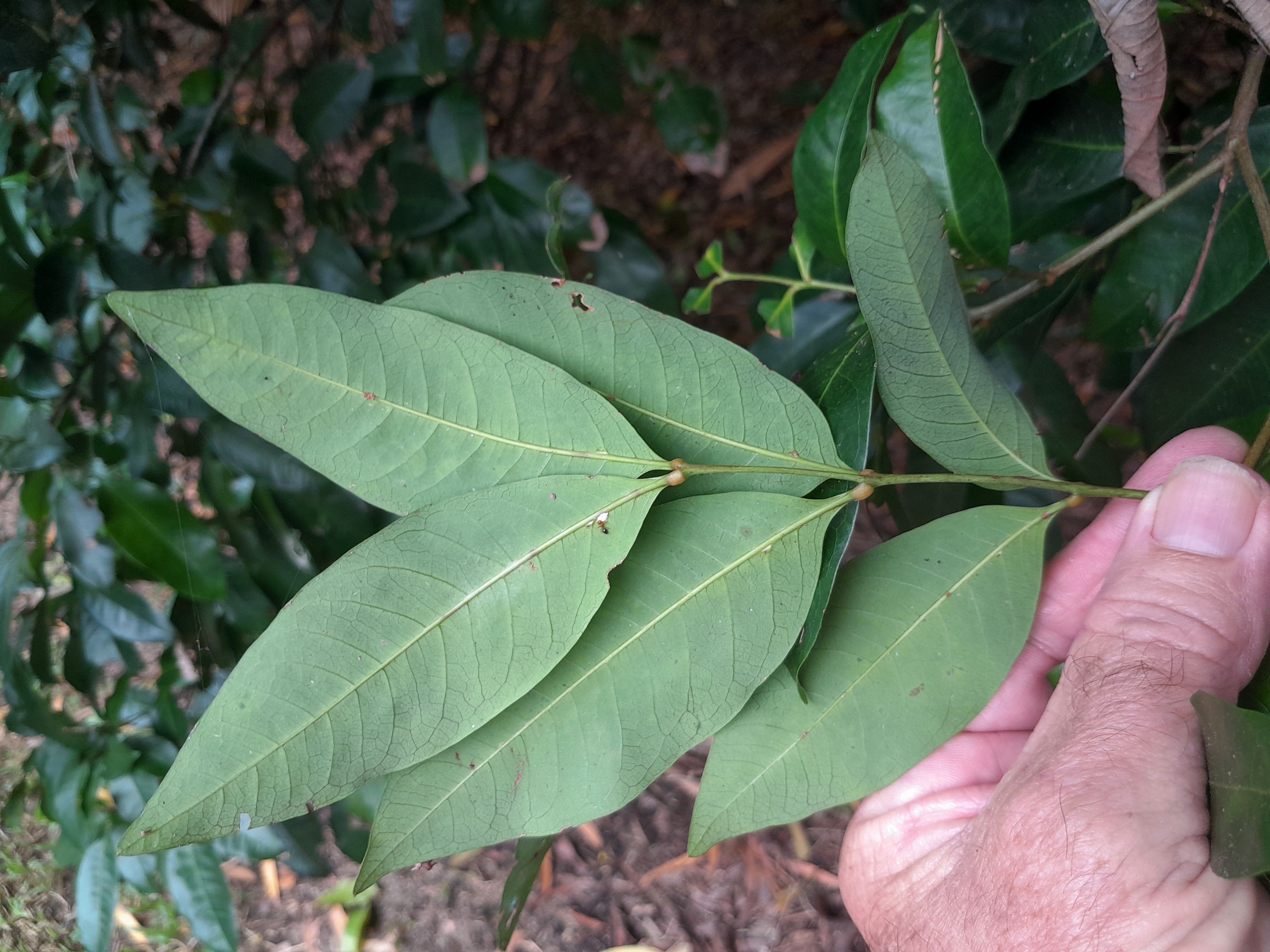
Underside of leaves

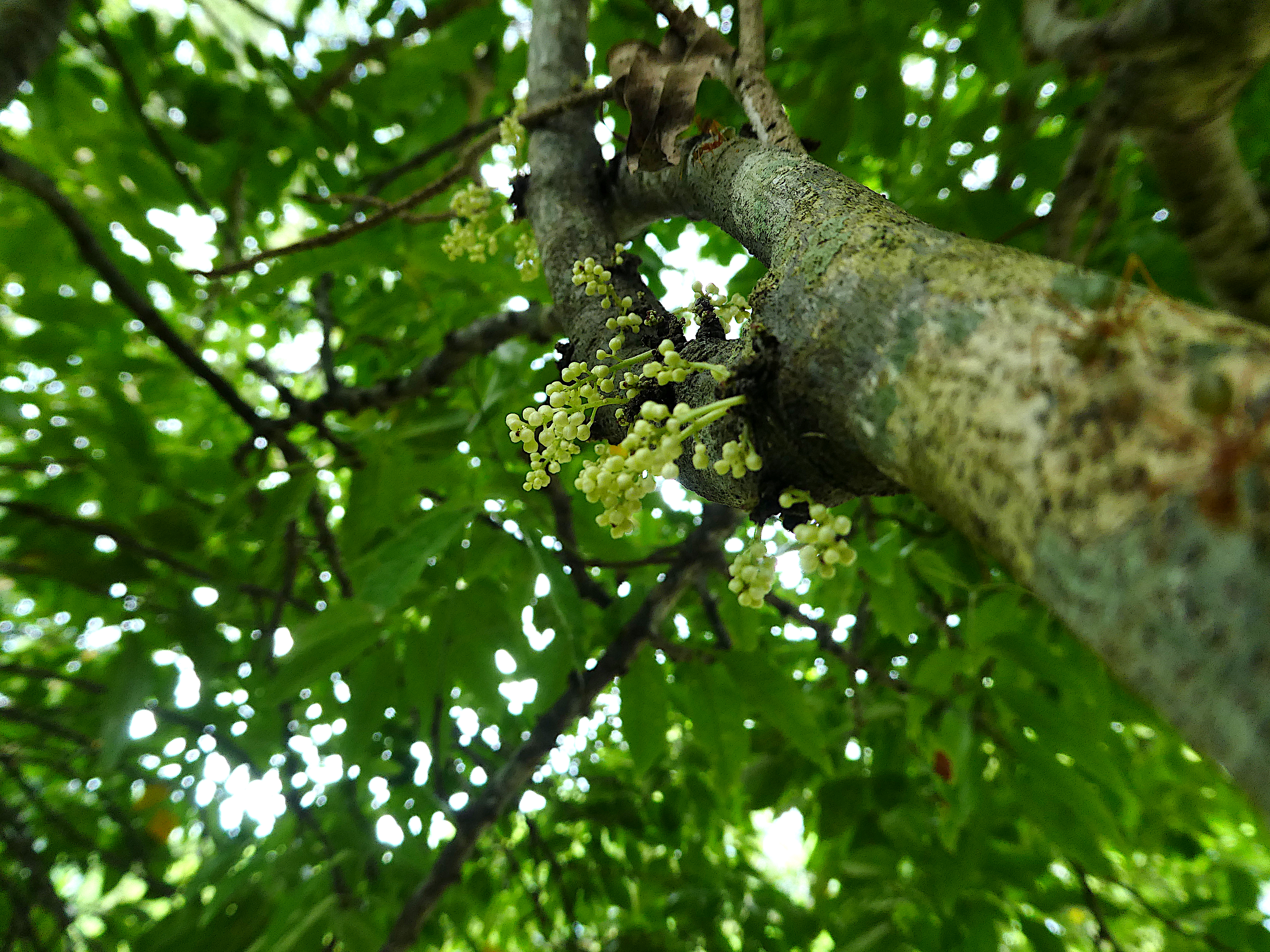
Flower buds, about 2 mm diameter

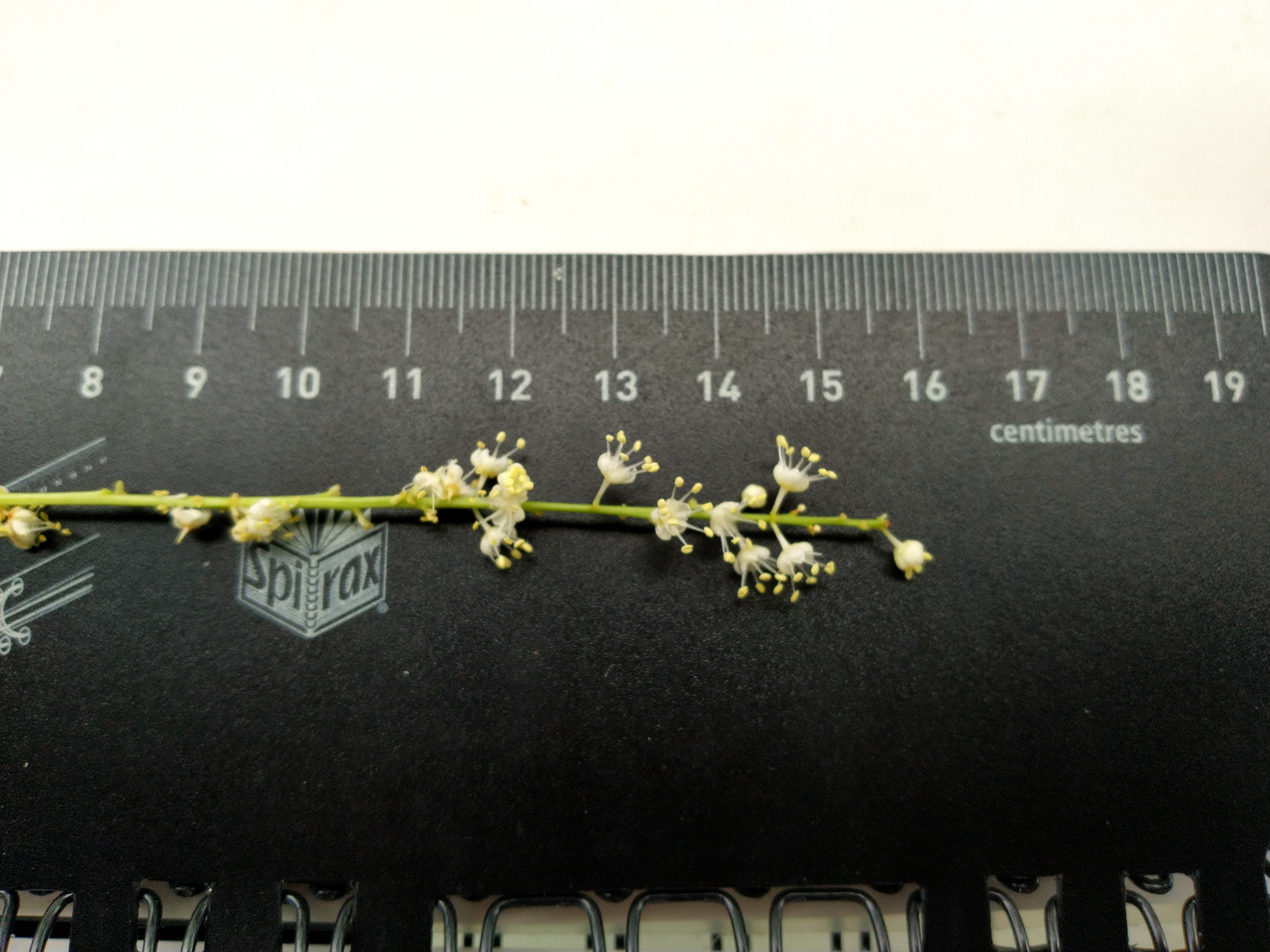
Close up of male flowers
