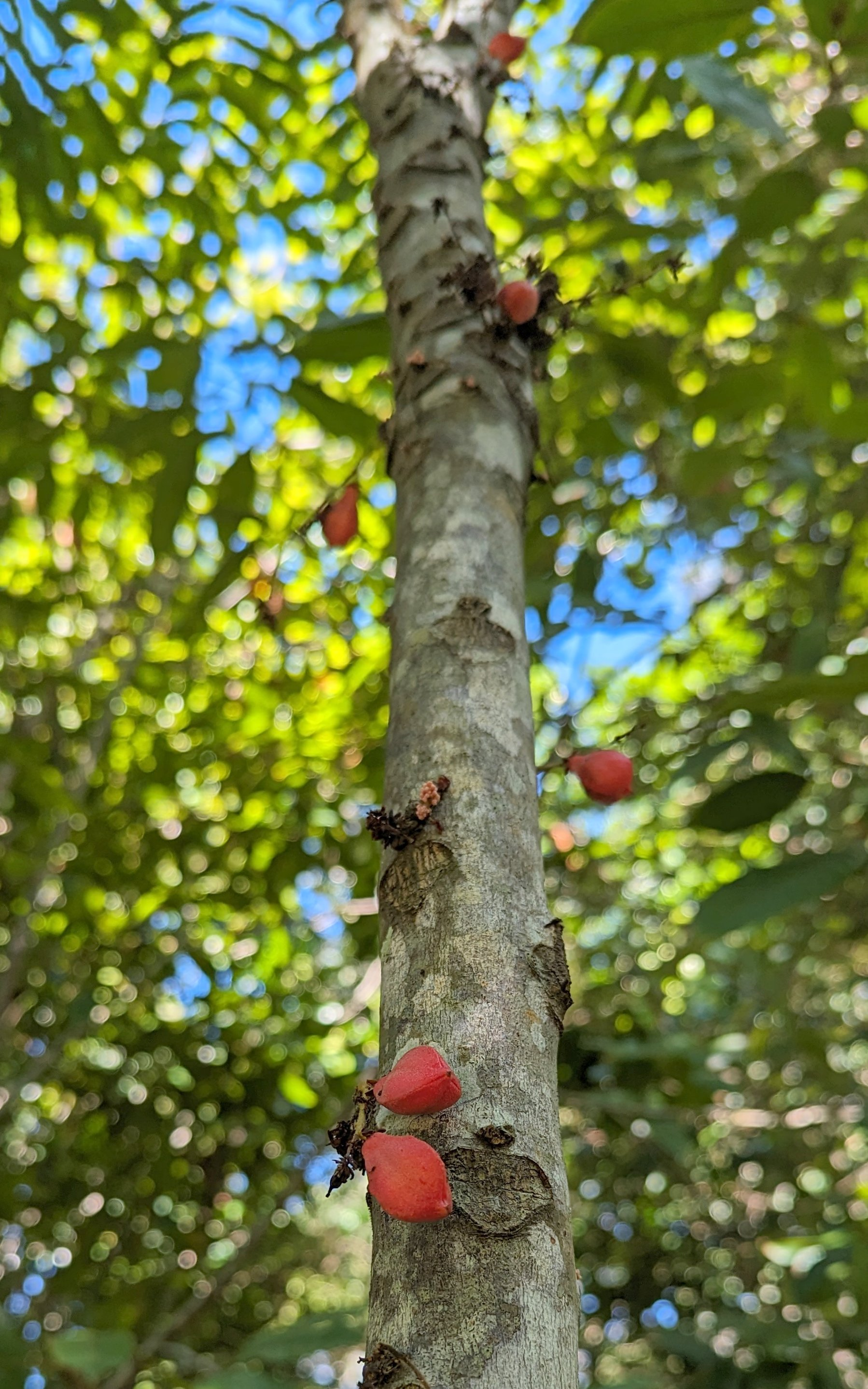

Scientific classification
- Kingdom: Plantae
- Clade: Tracheophytes
- Clade: Angiosperms
- Clade: Eudicots
- Clade: Rosids
- Order: Sapindales
- Family: Sapindaceae
- Genus: Lepiderema
- Species: L. hirsuta

Binomial name
- Lepiderema hirsuta S.T.Reynolds

= Lepiderema hirsuta =

Noah's Tamarind

Species of flowering plant

Lepiderema hirsuta, commonly known as Noah's tamarind, is a species of plant in the soapberry family Sapindaceae. A small tree, found in the understorey of tropical rainforests of Queensland, Australia.
