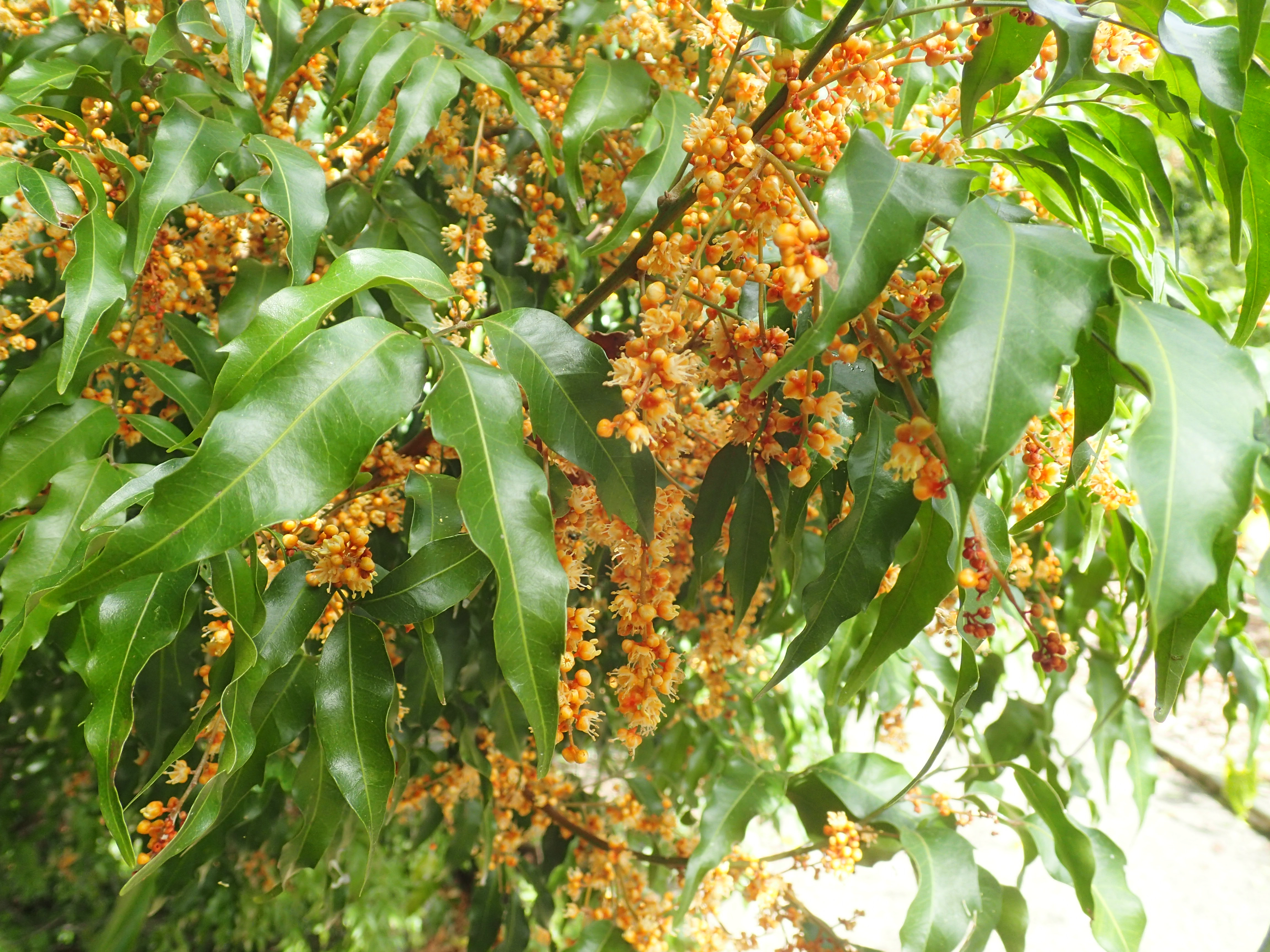
- Lepiderema pulchella in Coffs Harbour Botanic Garden

Scientific classification
- Kingdom: Plantae
- Clade: Tracheophytes
- Clade: Angiosperms
- Clade: Eudicots
- Clade: Rosids
- Order: Sapindales
- Family: Sapindaceae
- Genus: Lepiderema
- Species: L. pulchella

Binomial name
- Lepiderema pulchella Radlk.

= Lepiderema pulchella =

Fine-leaved tuckeroo

Species of flowering plant

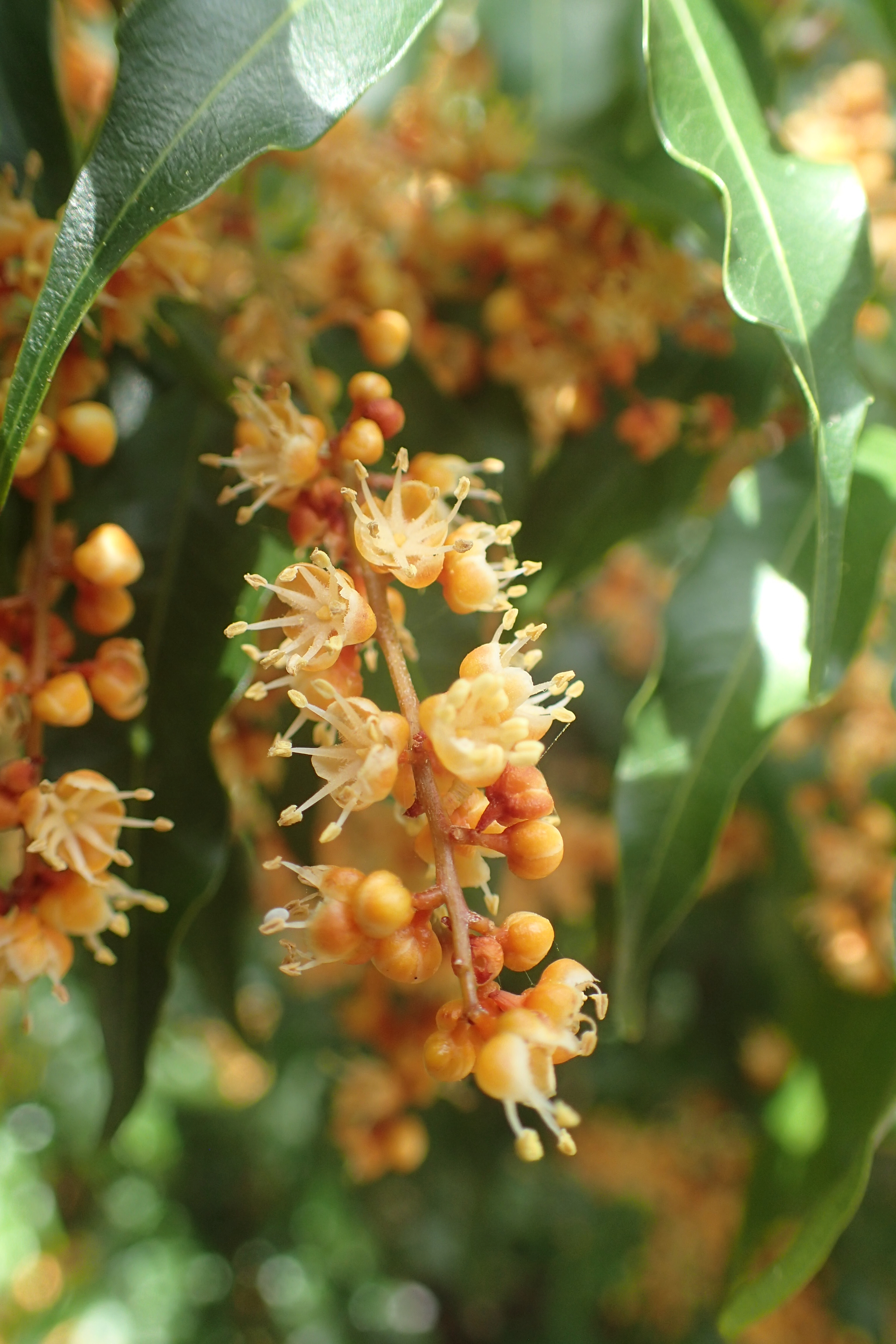
Flower detail

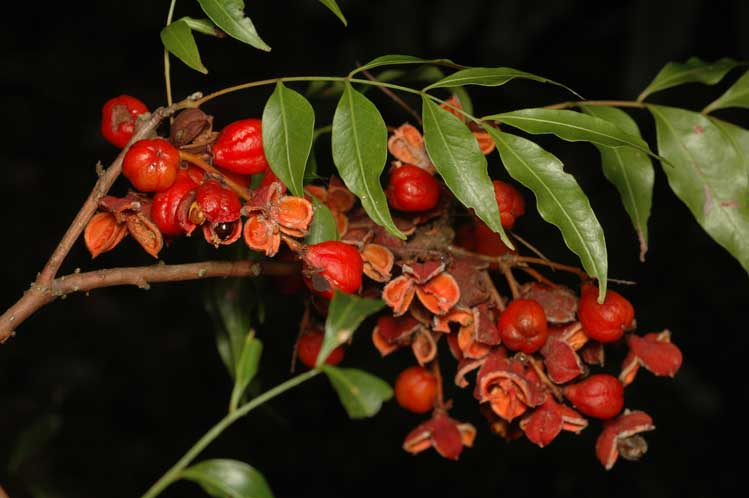
Fruit

Lepiderema pulchella, commonly known as fine-leaved tuckeroo, is a species of flowering plant in the family Sapindaceae and is endemic to coastal eastern Australia. It is a tree with pinnate, glossy light green leaves with four to fourteen leaflets, panicles of yellow-orange flowers and brown, spherical to three-lobed fruit.

== Description ==
Lepiderema pulchella is a tree that typically grows to a height of 15 m (49 ft) and is mostly glabrous. The leaves are pinnate, 70–150 mm (2.8–5.9 in) long on a petiole 15–25 mm (0.59–0.98 in) long with four to fourteen leaflets, the leaflets narrow elliptic to lance-shaped, more or less curved, 25–80 mm (0.98–3.15 in) long, 10–25 mm (0.39–0.98 in) wide and with wavy edges. The flowers are arranged in panicles 55–120 mm (2.2–4.7 in) long in leaf axils, each flower on a pedicel 2–3.5 mm (0.079–0.138 in) long. The flowers are yellow-orange and 2–3 mm (0.079–0.118 in) long, the sepals 1.5–3.5 mm (0.059–0.138 in) long. The fruit is a brown, spherical to three-lobed capsule 8–10 mm (0.31–0.39 in) in diameter containing dark brown seeds about 5 mm (0.20 in) long, the fruit maturing in December.

== Taxonomy ==
Lepiderema pulchella was first formally described in 1907 by Ludwig Adolph Timotheus Radlkofer in Die Natürlichen Pflanzenfamilien Nachtr.

== Distribution and habitat ==
Fine-leaved tuckeroo grows on creek and river banks and at the edge of rainforest from far south-eastern Queensland to the Tweed River in New South Wales.

== Conservation status ==
This tuckeroo is classified as "vulnerable" under the Queensland Government Nature Conservation Act 1992.
