= Open (band) =

Open are an Australian band.

== Background ==
Drummer Pete Neville has been involved in the Sydney/Australian music scene for a number of years. He has recently completed a Masters in screen music at the Australian Film Television and Radio School. He was a member of jazz/rock band Trout Fishing in Quebec and plays percussion with hip hop band Resin Dogs and rockers You Am I.

With guitarist and songwriter Daniel Pugliese, Pete Neville and Gabrielle Rogers formed Open in 2005. Performing live at famous Sydney venues such as The Basement, the live line-up has included Paul Bianco, Jack Friels, Paul Mason and Jak Housden.

== Discography ==
=== EPs ===
- Open Self-titled EP released March 2006 includes songs:
  - "Your Monkey"
  - "Still"
  - "Baby Just Won't"
  - "I'm Not Trying to Break Your Heart"
  - Album "For the Faint of Heart" released May 2011.
