= Macdonaldtown =

Coordinates: 33°53′49″S 151°11′12″E

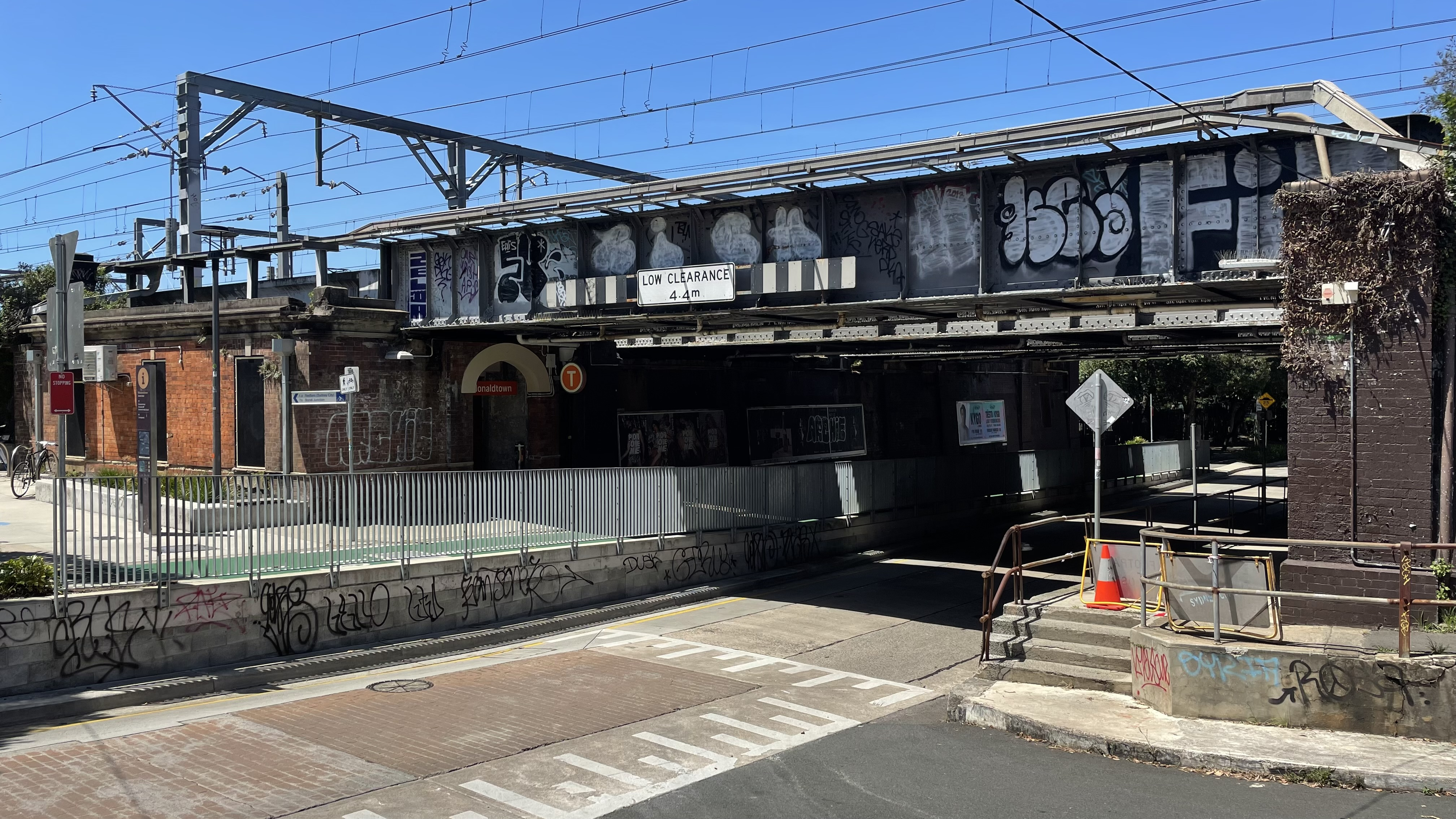
- Macdonaldtown railway station entrance
- Country: Australia
- State: New South Wales
- City: Sydney
- LGA: City of Sydney
- Location: 4 km (2.5 mi) south-west of Sydney CBD
- Postcode: 2042
Localities around Macdonaldtown
Erskineville	Newtown	Camperdown
Alexandria	Macdonaldtown	Eveleigh
Redfern	Golden Grove	Darlington

Macdonaldtown was a suburb in Sydney, in the state of New South Wales, Australia. The suburb was incorporated into Erskineville and Newtown. All that remains of Macdonaldtown's legacy is Macdonaldtown railway station. Macdonaldtown was 4 kilometres south-west of the Sydney central business district, adjacent to the suburbs of Newtown, Eveleigh and Erskineville. Macdonaldtown is informally part of the region of the Inner West.

== History ==
Macdonaldtown Map 1886 -1889 (City of Sydney Archives)

The suburb of Macdonaldtown was named for Stephen Macdonald, who owned property in the south of the area. It was advertised with the name "Macdonald Town". The whole suburb of Macdonald was incorporated as a local government area in 1872 and was renamed as Erskineville in 1893. The area was renamed after the local Reverend George's "Erskine's villa" because they wanted the blue-collar town to have a nice, "virtuous" name and it would drive property prices up in the tough, working class area.

The area of Macdonaldtown/Erskineville was established as a residential and farming area in the early 19th century. Nicholas Devine, the first principal superintendent of convicts called his property Burren Farm, after a region of County Clare in his native Ireland. Burren Farm would later become parts of Macdonaldtown (now Erskineville) and Newtown. Devine Street is named after Nicholas Devine and Burren Street is named after his farm.

The streets around the early Macdonaldtown subdivision are named after relations of the Macdonald family - Amy, Flora, Eve, Coulson and Rochford. Knight Street is named for Henry Knight, one of the earliest brickmakers in the district and the first mayor of Macdonaldtown.

The area was first incorporated on 23 May 1872, with the name of the "Municipal District of Macdonald Town" (but was variously known as the "Borough of Macdonald Town" or the "Municipality of Macdonaldtown"). On 19 July 1872, the first council, consisting of six aldermen in one electorate, was elected (Charles Brandling Henderson, Henry Knight, James Bryan, Alexander Swanson, William Irwin and James Heighington), with Henry Knight elected as the first mayor at the first meeting on 23 July 1872.

In 1893 Macdonaldtown was renamed as Erskineville, when the Parliament of New South Wales passed the "Borough of Erskineville Naming Act, 1893", effecting the municipal name change. In the late nineteenth century, the inhabitants were originally market gardeners, though brick making and tanning also became dominant industries. The Victorian cottages and small rows of Victorian terraces that dominate the built form of the suburb were the homes of the workers in these industries, which explains their smallness: a four-metre wide terrace is large by Erskineville standards.

== Notable residents ==
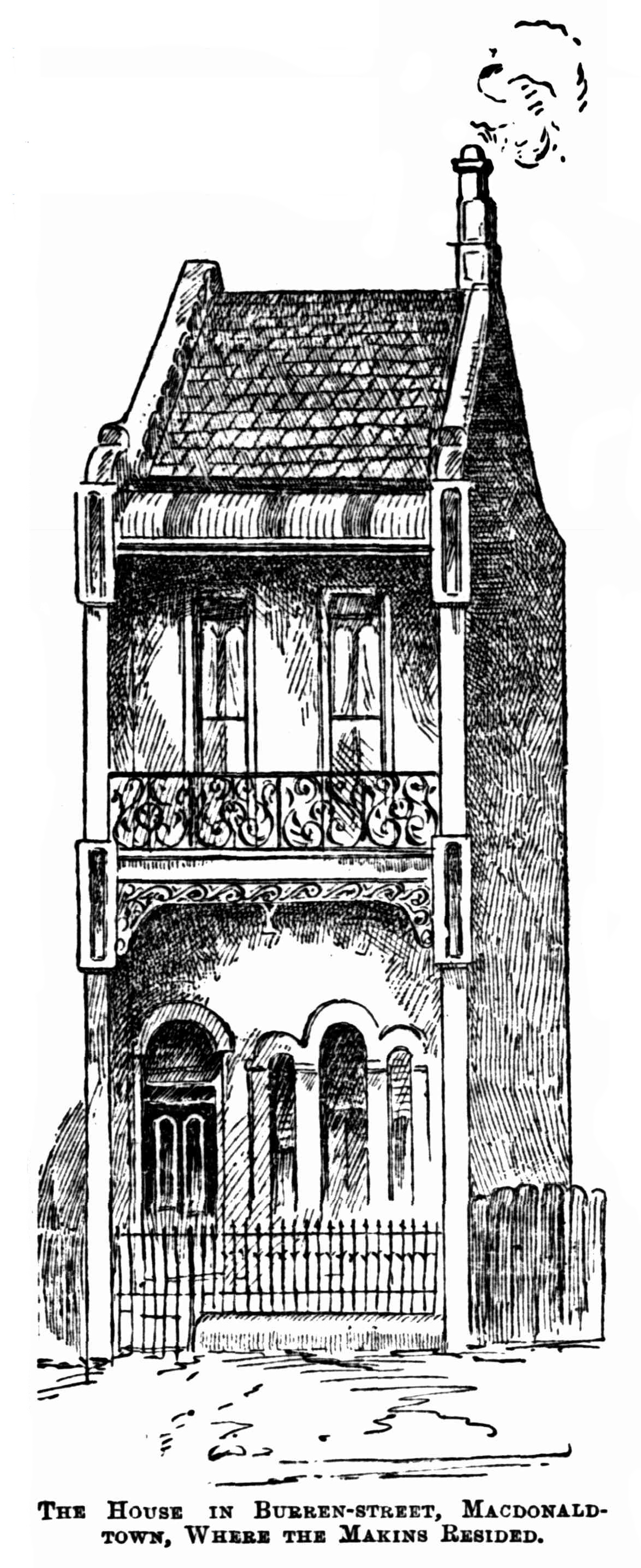
The house in Burren Street, Macdonaldtown, where John and Sarah Makin AKA The Hatpin Murderers resided (from the Illustrated Sydney News, 12 November 1892)

• John and Sarah Makin also known as the Hatpin Murderers were 'baby farmers' who in 1892 were convicted of murder after bodies of infants were found buried in the yard of their Macdonaldtown home

== Sources ==
- The Book of Sydney Suburbs, Compiled by Frances Pollen, Angus & Robertson Publishers, 1990, Published in Australia ISBN 0-207-14495-8
