= Golden Grove, New South Wales =

Coordinates: 33°53′49″S 151°11′12″E

Golden Grove
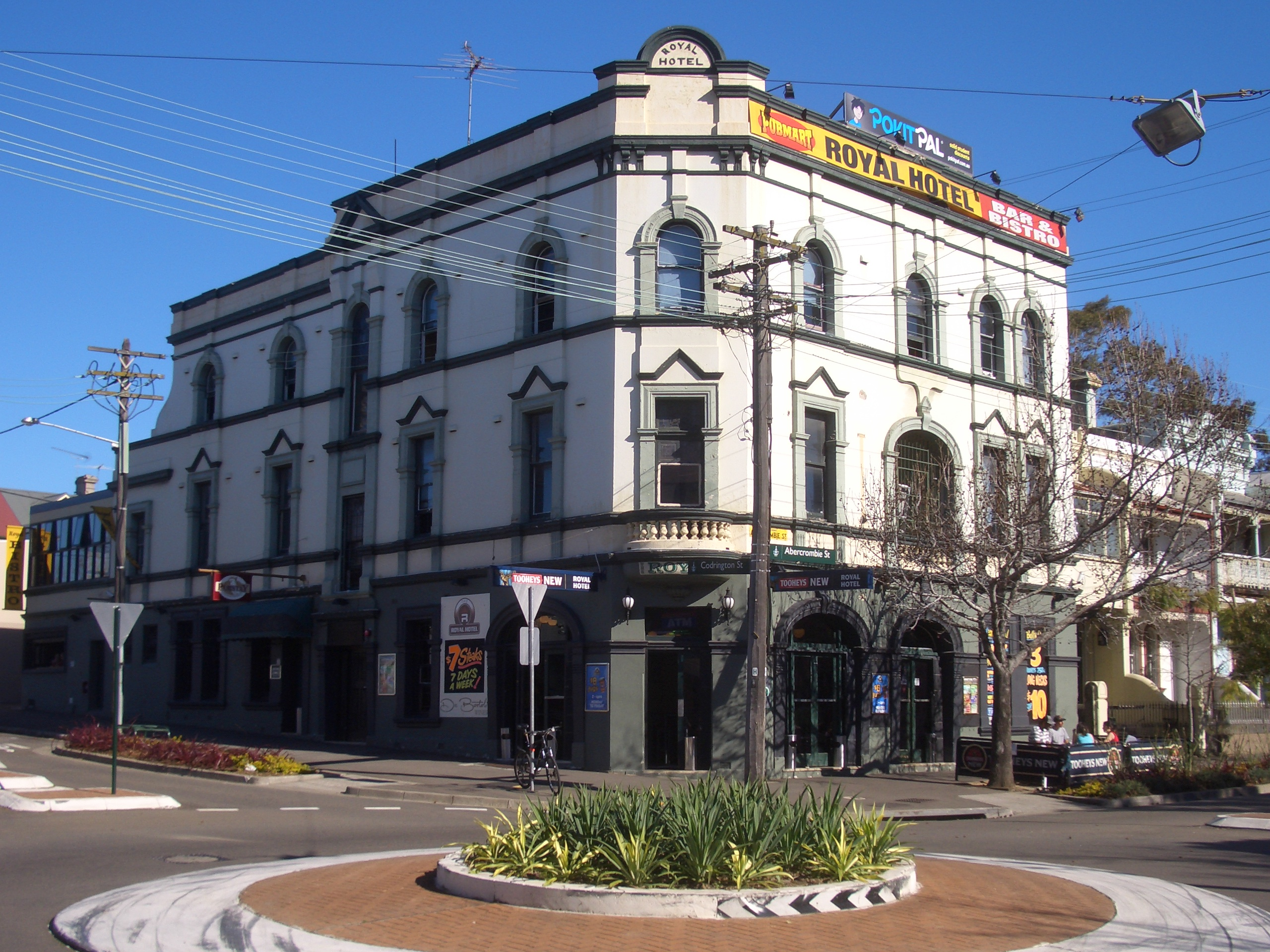
- Darlington Royal Hotel, corner of the locality
- Country: Australia
- State: New South Wales
- City: Sydney
- LGA: City of Sydney
- Location: 4 km (2.5 mi) south-west of Sydney CBD
- Postcodes: *2042: 2008; 2015
Localities around Golden Grove
Camperdown	Camperdown	Darlington
Newtown	Golden Grove	Darlington
Macdonaldtown	Eveleigh	Eveleigh

Golden Grove is an urban place in Sydney, in the state of New South Wales, Australia. It is 4 kilometres south-west of the Sydney central business district, adjacent to the suburbs of Newtown, Darlington and Eveleigh. Golden Grove is part of the local government area of the City of Sydney. The locality is around Golden Grove Street, surrounding Forbes Street, Wilson Street, Abercrombie Street, along with the Golden Grove Housing Estate, Forbes Street Reserve, Golden Grove Ministry Centre. The former suburb of the postcode 2006 was named after the First Fleet store ship that left Portsmouth on 13 May 1787, and arrived at Port Jackson, Sydney Australia, on 26 January 1788.

== History ==
A few years after the arrival of the First Fleet in 1788, a suburb in the city of Sydney was named for the Golden Grove.

Built in 1780 as the Russian Merchant, the ship's name was changed five years before its departure for Botany Bay It was a prescient move – even back then, Russian collusion wasn't something to make public. Known as “Noah’s Ark of Australia”, the Golden Grove carried a bunch of animals to a wild, inhospitable place unprepared for the subsequent chaos of colonisation. Despite the fleet's lasting legacy being in evidence literally everywhere in the colony of New South Wales, someone thought a suburban tribute was a good idea. Thus, Golden Grove was born in the approximate location of today's Darlington/Newtown border. William Shepherd, the first white settler here, was originally offered Grose Farm, on which the Sydney University now stands, but he declined it, saying it was too far out of town. Instead he took up what is today known as Darlington. Shepherd's southern neighbour was James Chisholm. His grant was called Golden Grove. It was resumed in 1878 to build the Eveleigh Railway Workshops. A section of it was subdivided in about 1881. The small allotments in it were advertised as 'workmen's dwellings' and most home building occurred here during the late 1880s. The name Golden Grove is still used today.

=== Public Housing ===
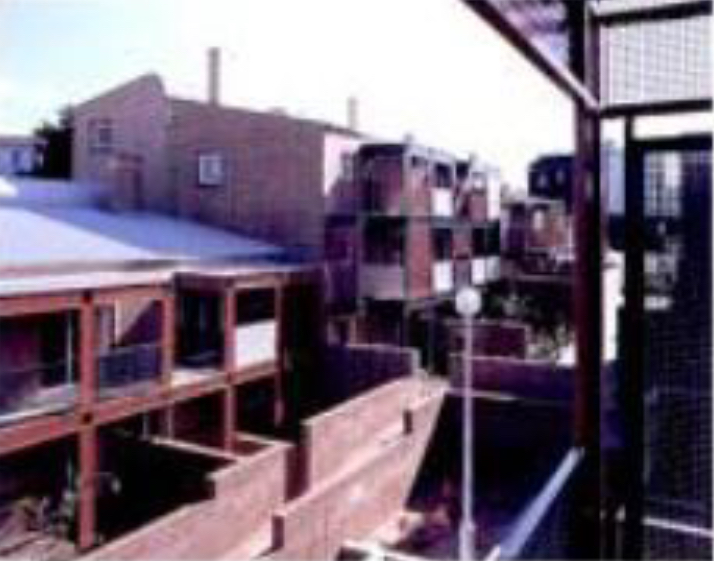
Golden Grove Public Housing Apartments

During the 1980s, the Housing Commission constructed a High Density housing estate, containing a 7-story tower block and numerous Radburn townhouse/maisonette flats, home to approximately 300-500 people. The Area was also once home to an adjacent public housing apartment block on Wilson street, developed 20 years before, which eventually diminished in quality and was demolished, with replacement public housing flats constructed in a mixed development across the road in Carriageworks.

According to the 2016 Index of Relative Socio-economic Advantage and Disadvantage, the local SA1s of Golden Grove and North Eveleigh: 11703133252 11703133508 Score: 960 and 850 compared to the City of Sydney average of 1095, making the locality the most disadvantaged area in all three suburbs of Newtown, Eveleigh and Darlington, and containing the highest ratio of public housing. (54%)
