= St James, New South Wales =

Demographic area

St James
- Locality
- Etymology: Named after St James' Church
- Interactive map of St James
- Coordinates: 33.8694°S 151.2106°E
- Country: Australia
- State: New South Wales
- City: City of Sydney
- Centered on Hyde Park and King Street.

St James is a locality within the City of Sydney, centred on St James' Church on King Street. The locality includes much of Hyde Park, those parts of the city from Elizabeth Street through to Macquarie Street.

St James railway station was opened in December 1926 as part of the City Circle. It is an underground station, constructed below Hyde Park. The station was the first electric railway service to enter an Australian city centre. The station is part of the Sydney Trains network, offering direct services to Sydney Airport.

David Jones used the name "St. James" as its private label in the second half of the twentieth century, reflecting the location of the main store on Elizabeth Street (opened in 1927).
