= Coat of arms of Sydney =

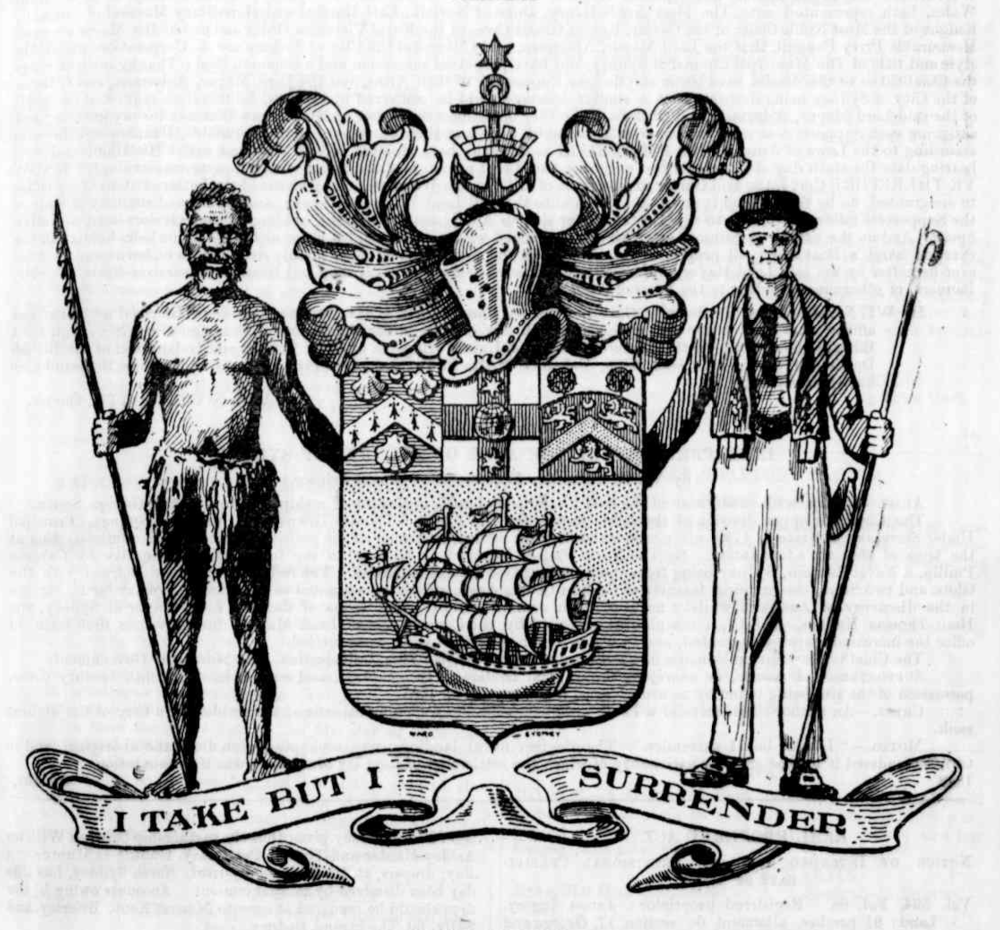
The original coat of arms (1908)

The coat of arms of Sydney was granted to the city on 30 July 1908 by England's College of Arms. A redesigned version was unveiled in 1996. Its elements represent the city's British and Aboriginal heritage, as well as its maritime identity.

== Meanings ==
The arms feature a three-masted ship on a gold and blue background, along with symbols pertaining to various figures in Sydney's history (namely Viscount Sydney, Governor Phillip, Captain James Cook, and Sir Thomas Hughes). The crest is an anchor encircled by a mural crown and surmounted by a six-pointed star, and the supporters are an Aboriginal and an 18th-century British seaman. The motto is "I take but I surrender". An interpretation published alongside the grant of arms explains this as follows:

The English landing party took possession from the aborigine, and in turn surrendered it to that growing nationality of which the settlement of the City of Sydney was the foundation.

This rendition features on the lord mayoral chains of office.

=== Redesign ===
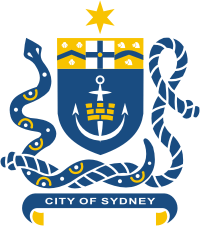
The redesigned coat of arms (1996)

In 1996, the arms were extensively redesigned. The redesign simplified the arms, removing the motto and replacing the human supporters with a snake and a coiled rope. The snake represents the Rainbow Serpent, an Aboriginal creator-being. It is adorned with markings used by the Eora people, the original inhabitants of Port Jackson. The rope, a maritime symbol, "highlights the diverse cultural origins of the people of Sydney", and, entwined with the snake, "suggests cultural harmony".

The anchor represents that it was a naval officer who claimed Australia for the Crown. The mural crown denotes the city's authority. The simplified arms of Townshend, Cook and Hughes also feature. In unison, "these symbols represent the naming of Sydney, the British contribution to the establishment of Sydney, and Sydney's emergence as a great maritime port city".

This refreshed design is used on the City of Sydney's seal, which authenticates documents.

== History ==
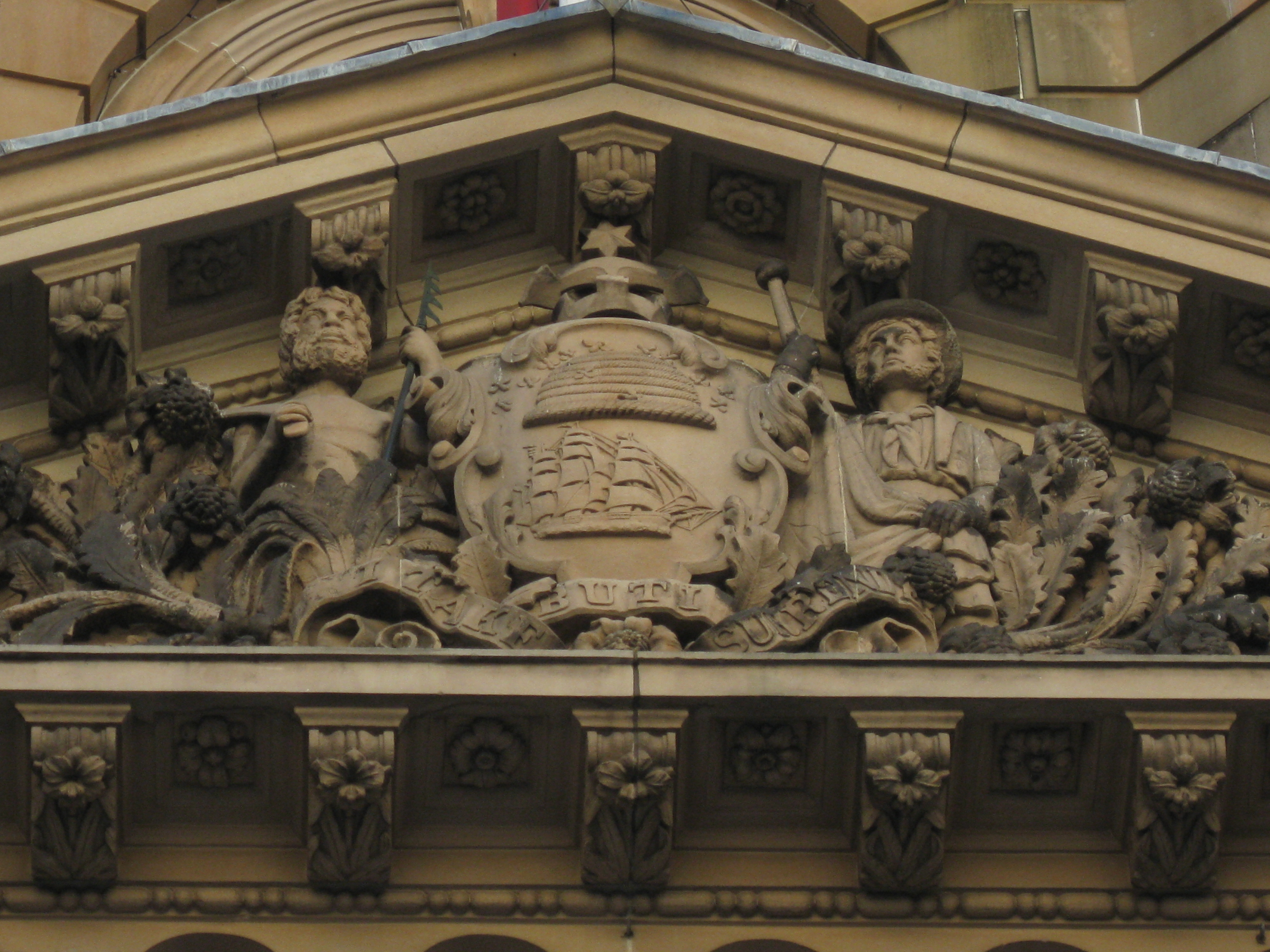
A historical version of the arms on the facade of Sydney Town Hall

From 1857 until 1908, the City of Sydney used variations on a design for the city seal by Monsieur de St Remy, a draughtsman in the City Surveyor's Department. This design, which was never officially granted, featured a shield with a rising sun, and a ship, representing Sydney's maritime heritage. The sun was later replaced with a beehive, a symbol of industry. Like later iterations of the arms, the design included an Aboriginal and a British sailor and the motto "I take but I surrender".

In 1902, Sir Thomas Hughes became the first Lord Mayor of Sydney. Hughes suggested that the council commission a new coat of arms and submit a petition to the College of Arms in London. The new arms, designed by William Frederic Ward, drew on de St Remy's design, but also included elements from the arms of Viscount Sidney and Captain Cook. The final version, granted in 1908, also included the arms of Hughes himself.

== See also ==
- Flag of Sydney
- Coat of arms of New South Wales
- Australian heraldry
