= Flag of the City of Sydney =

Australian municipal flag

City of Sydney
- Proportion: 1:2
- Adopted: 30 July 1908; 118 years ago
- Design: Horizontal triband of three colours, featuring the coat of arms of Thomas Townshend, Viscount Sydney, James Cook, and Thomas Hughes

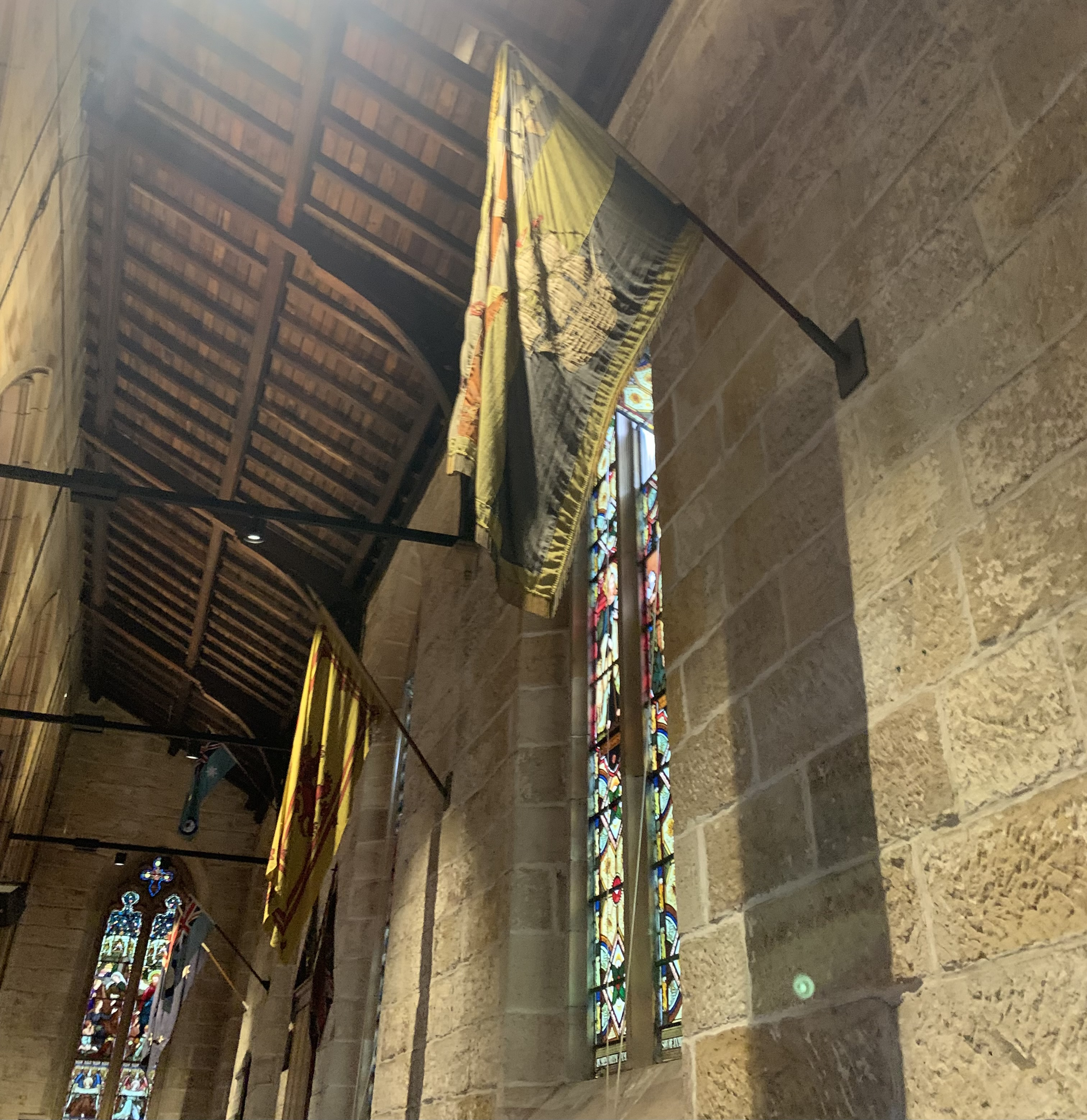
City of Sydney flag in the Garrison Church, Millers Point

The City of Sydney flag is made up of a horizontal triband, with three designs in the top band and a sail ship embellishing the bottom two. It was designed and adopted in 1908.

== Description ==
Per the City of Sydney website:

In the top left are the arms belonging to Thomas Townshend, Viscount Sydney, after whom the city was named.

The English Naval Flag in the centre acknowledges the role Arthur Phillip played in Sydney's foundation.

The red cross is overlaid with a globe and two stars, the principal features of James Cook's arms, which were granted as a posthumous honour for his service in mapping Australia.

The arms in the top right belong to the first Lord Mayor of Sydney, Thomas Hughes. It was during his term of office that the title of Mayor became Lord Mayor, and the official coat of arms for the city was granted.

The remaining field of the flag features a ship under full sail, an allusion to the prominence of Sydney as a maritime port.

== Usage ==
In 2024, the city was in the process of reviewing its symbols, including the flag. Lord Mayor Clover Moore said it "contains no acknowledgement" of Indigenous Australians.

== See also ==
- Coat of arms of Sydney
- List of Australian flags
