= City of Sydney =

Local government area in Australia

- Local government area
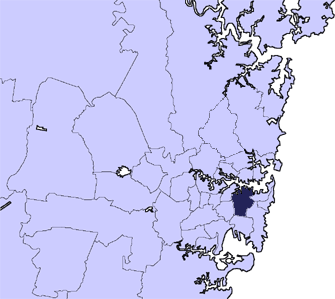
- Location in Metropolitan Sydney

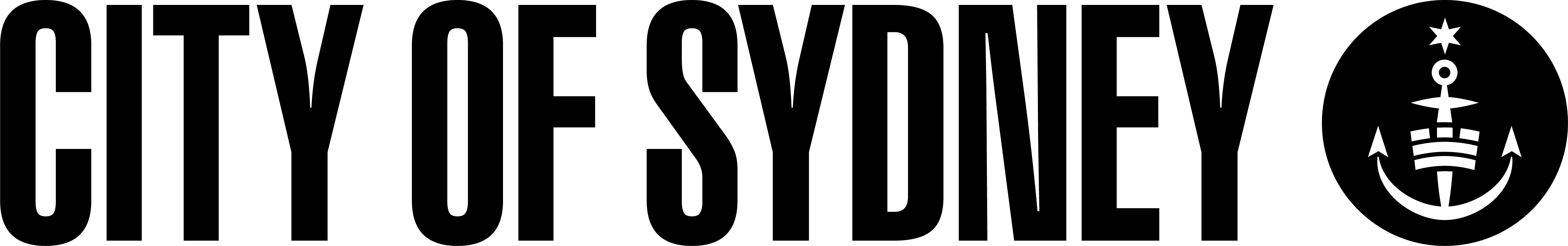
- Interactive map of City of Sydney
- Coordinates: 33°52′S 151°12′E
- Country: Australia
- State: New South Wales
- Region: Central Sydney
- Established: 20 July 1842
- Council seat: Sydney CBD (Town Hall)

Government
  - Lord Mayor: Clover Moore
  - State electorates: Sydney; Balmain; Heffron; Newtown; Vaucluse
  - Federal divisions: Sydney; Wentworth; Grayndler

Area
  - Total: 25 km^{2} (9.7 sq mi)

Population
  - Total: 211,632 (2021 census) (17th)
  - Density: 8,470/km^{2} (21,900/sq mi)
- Time zone: UTC+10 (AEST)
  - Summer (DST): UTC+11 (AEDT)
- Website: City of Sydney
LGAs around City of Sydney
Lane Cove	North Sydney	Mosman
Inner West	City of Sydney	Woollahra
Inner West	Bayside	Randwick

The City of Sydney is the local government area (LGA) encompassing the Sydney central business district (CBD) and the surrounding inner city suburbs of Greater Sydney, New South Wales, Australia. Established by an Act of Parliament in 1842, the City of Sydney is the oldest, and the oldest-surviving, local government authority in New South Wales, and the second-oldest in Australia, with the City of Adelaide being older by two years.

Given its prominent position, historically, geographically, economically and socially, the City of Sydney has long been a source of political interest and intrigue. As a result of this, the boundaries, constitution and legal basis of the council have changed many times throughout its history, often to suit the governing party of the State of New South Wales. The City of Sydney is currently governed under the City of Sydney Act 1988, which defines and limits the powers, election method, constitution and boundaries of the council area. On 6 February 2004, the former local government area of the City of South Sydney, which itself had been created in 1989 from areas formerly part of the City of Sydney (including Alexandria, Darlington, Erskineville, Newtown and Redfern), was formally merged into the City of Sydney and the current city boundaries date from this merger.

The leader of the City of Sydney is known as the Lord Mayor of Sydney, currently held since 27 March 2004 by Clover Moore, who also served concurrently as the state Member of Parliament for Sydney and Bligh from 1988 to 2012.

== History ==
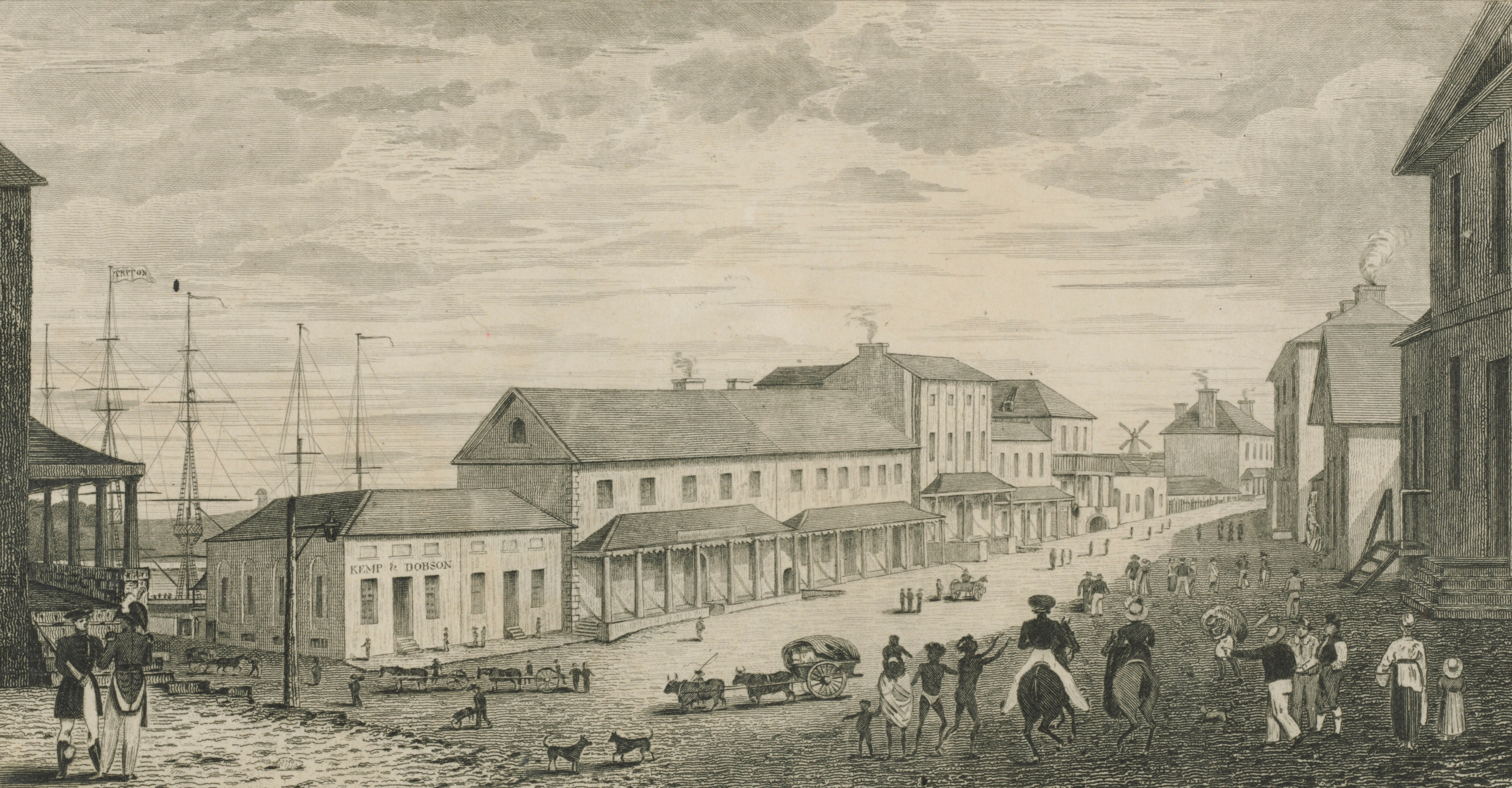
Lower George Street, Sydney, 1829, by J. Carmichael

The City of Sydney flag, designed in 1908

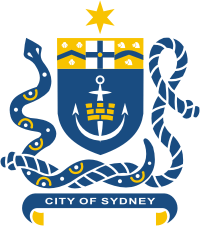
The 1996 coat of arms of Sydney

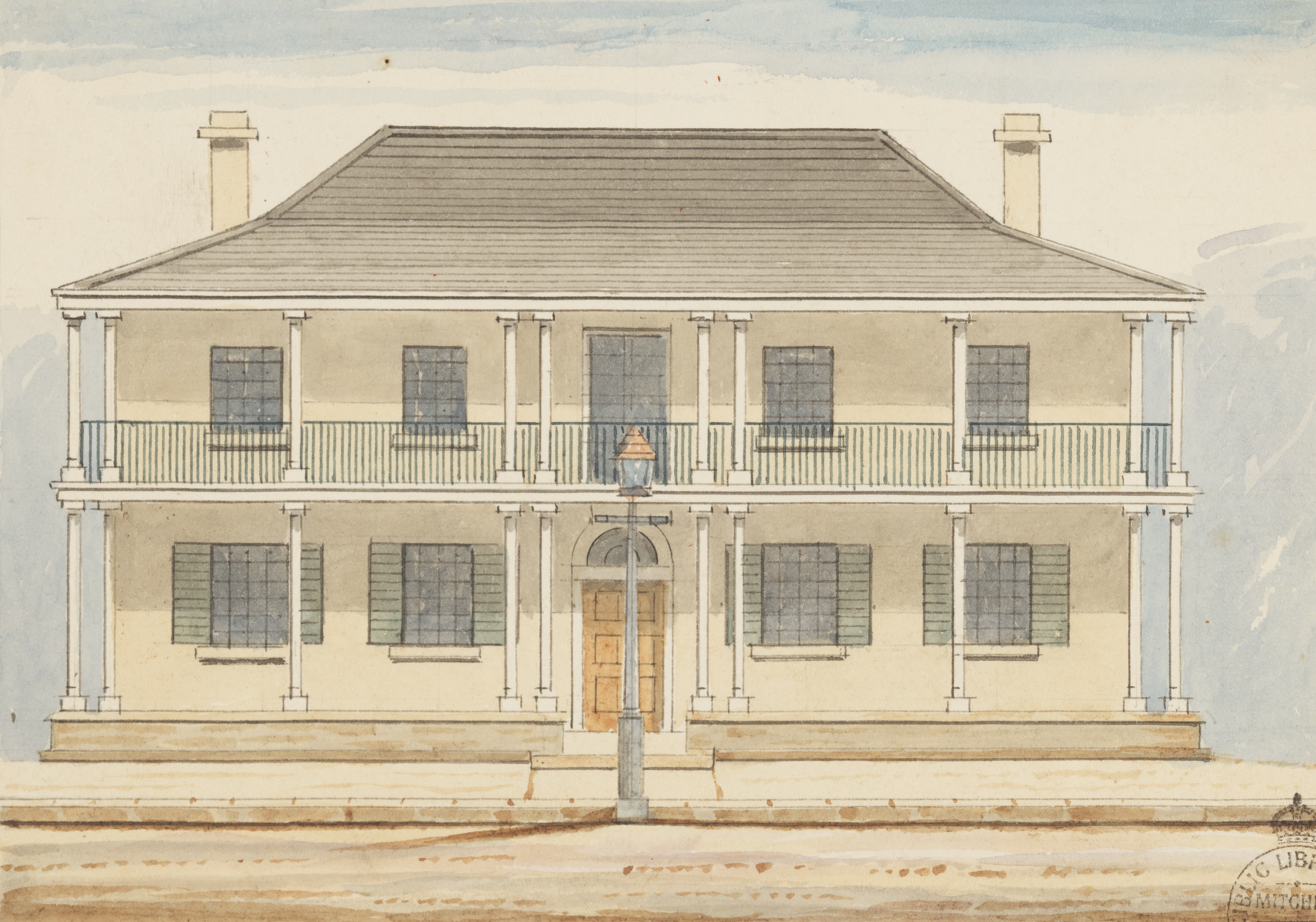
City Council chambers, Sydney, 1840s

The name Sydney comes from "Sydney Cove" which is where Governor Arthur Phillip established the first British settlement, after arriving with the First Fleet. On 26 January 1788, he named it after Thomas Townshend, 1st Viscount Sydney, who was the Home Secretary at the time, and the man responsible for the plan for the convict colony in Australia.

The "City of Sydney" was established on 20 July 1842 by the New South Wales Government under the City of Sydney Act 1842 No. 16a. The area encompasses present-day Woolloomooloo, Surry Hills, Chippendale and Pyrmont, an area of 11.65 km^{2}. There were six wards established by boundary posts. These wards were: Gipps, Brisbane, Macquarie, Bourke, Cook and Phillip. A boundary post still exists in front of Sydney Square.

The boundaries of the City of Sydney have changed fairly regularly since 1900. The bankrupt Municipality of Camperdown was merged with the city in 1909. As a result of the Local Government (Areas) Act 1948, the municipalities of Alexandria, Darlington, Erskineville, Newtown, Redfern, The Glebe, Waterloo, and Paddington were added to the city. In 1968 the boundaries were changed and many of these suburbs moved to be part of a new municipality of South Sydney. South Sydney was brought back into the city in 1982, but became separate again under the City of Sydney Act of 1988 and then became smaller than its original size at 6.19 km^{2}. It grew again in February 2004 with the merger of the two council areas, and now has a population of approximately 170,000 people.

These changes in boundaries have often resulted in control of the council by the governing party in the Parliament of New South Wales at the time; the Labor Party often sought to have traditional working-class suburbs like Redfern, Erskineville, Alexandria and Waterloo included in the council area, and the Liberal Party and its predecessors often desired a smaller council area focused on inner-Sydney or a limited/broader voting franchise. A 1987 re-organisation initiated by a Labor state government and completed in 1989 under a Liberal Coalition government saw the City of Sydney split again, with southern suburbs forming the City of South Sydney, a moved that advantaged the government of the day, as the southern suburbs now in South Sydney Council had traditionally voted Labor.

On 8 May 2003 the Labor state Government partially undid this change, when approximately 40% of the South Sydney City Council area was merged back into the City of Sydney including Camperdown, Chippendale, Darlington, East Sydney, Kings Cross and Woolloomooloo. Glebe was also transferred back from Leichhardt Council to the City of Sydney. On 6 February 2004, the remaining parts of the South Sydney City Council were merged into the City of Sydney. Critics claimed that this was performed with the intention of creating a "super-council" which would be under the control of Labor, which also controlled the NSW Government. Subsequent to this merger, an election took place on 27 March 2004 which resulted in the independent candidate Clover Moore defeating the high-profile Labor candidate, former federal minister Michael Lee and winning the position of Lord Mayor.

=== Boundary ===
The current City of Sydney Local Government Area (LGA) covers about 26.15 square kilometres (281,500,000 sq ft).

City of Sydney provides an official map of the LGA. Alternatively the Geographical Names Board of New South Wales provides an interactive map of the Sydney LGA.

==== Historical boundaries ====
The City of Sydney is traditionally the governing authority for Sydney's city centre. However, the boundaries of the City of Sydney have always been larger than the city centre or CBD. For example, Pyrmont has been in the City of Sydney since 1842 but is usually considered to be an inner western suburb, not a part of the Sydney city centre or CBD.

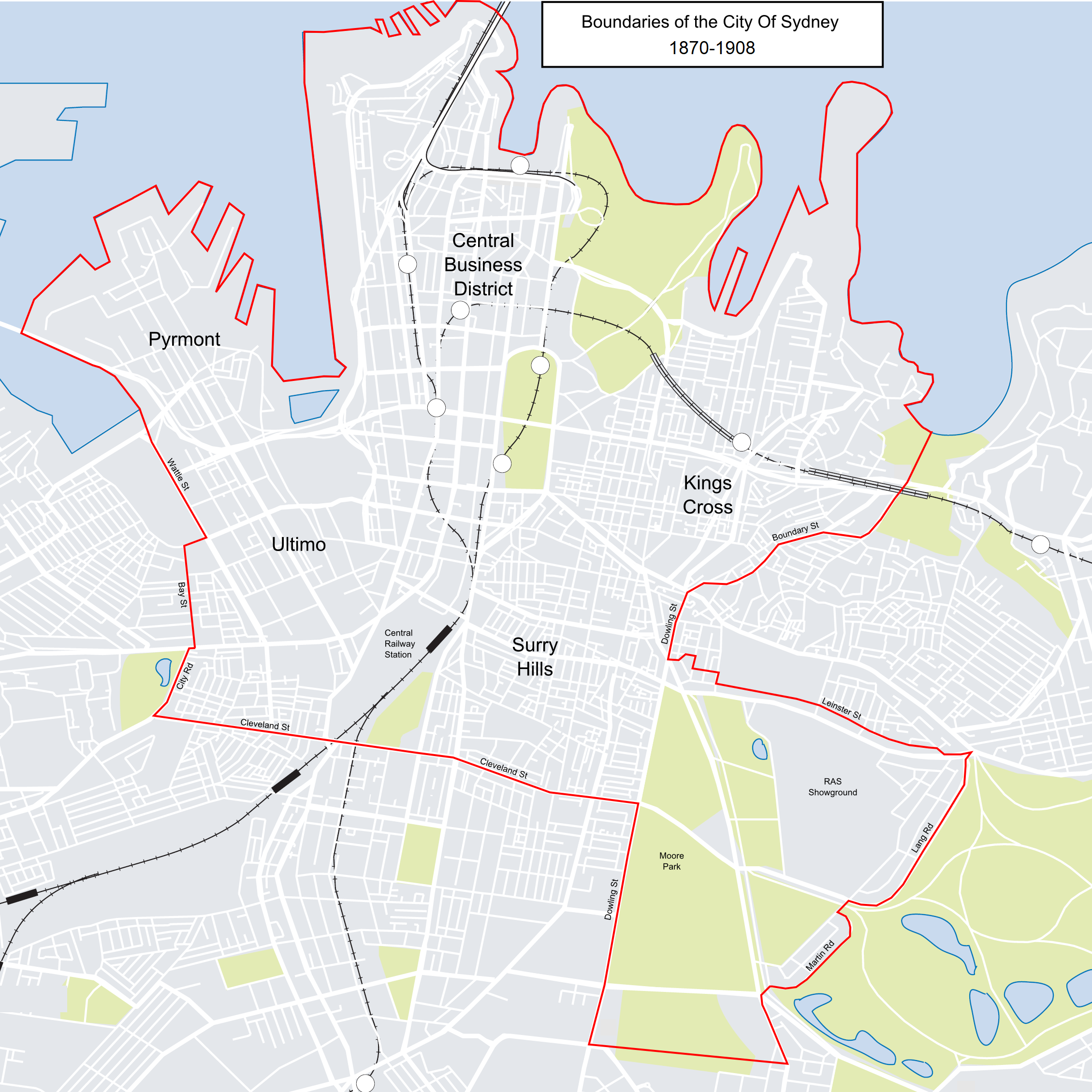
Boundaries pre-1909

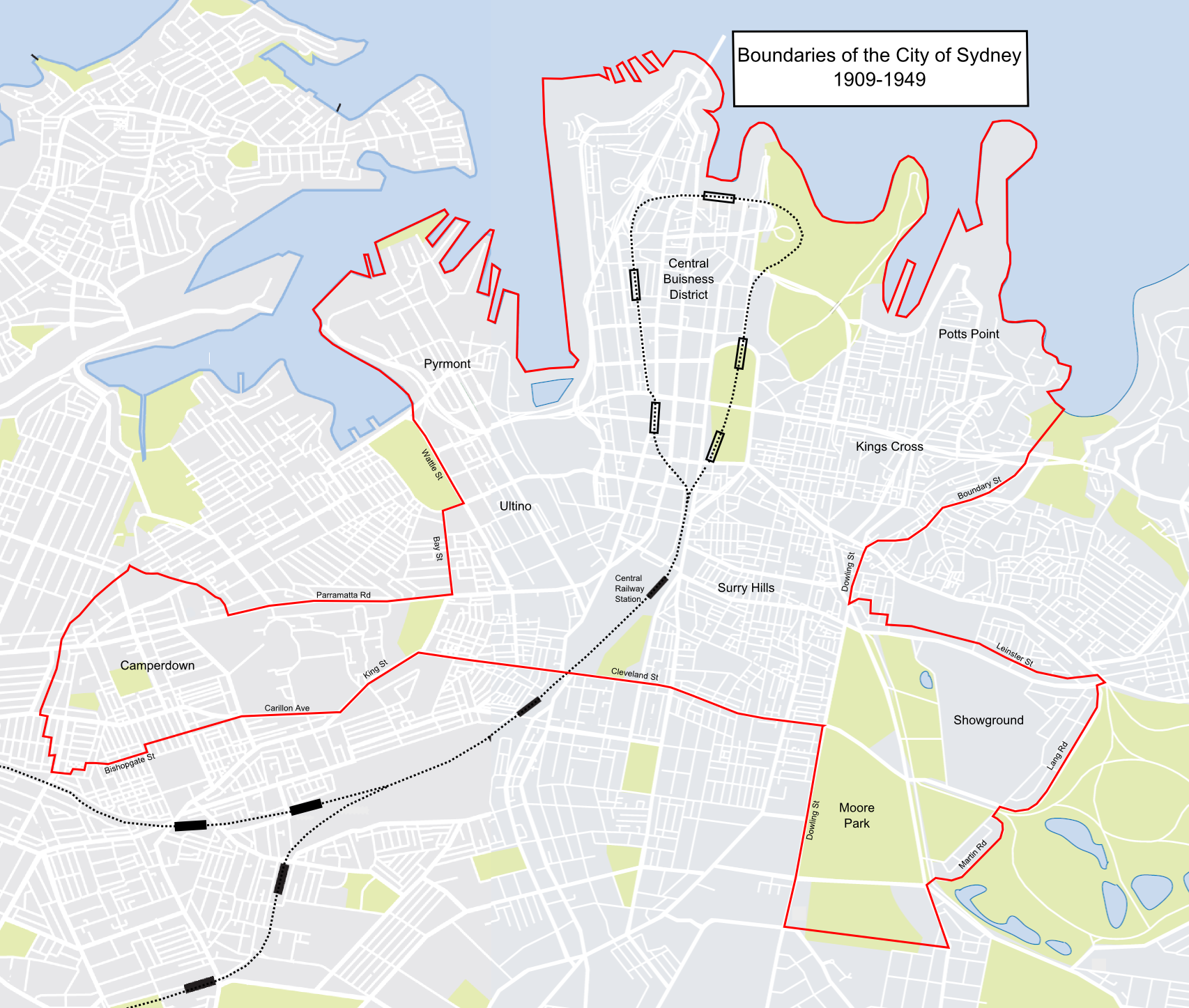
Boundaries 1909–1948

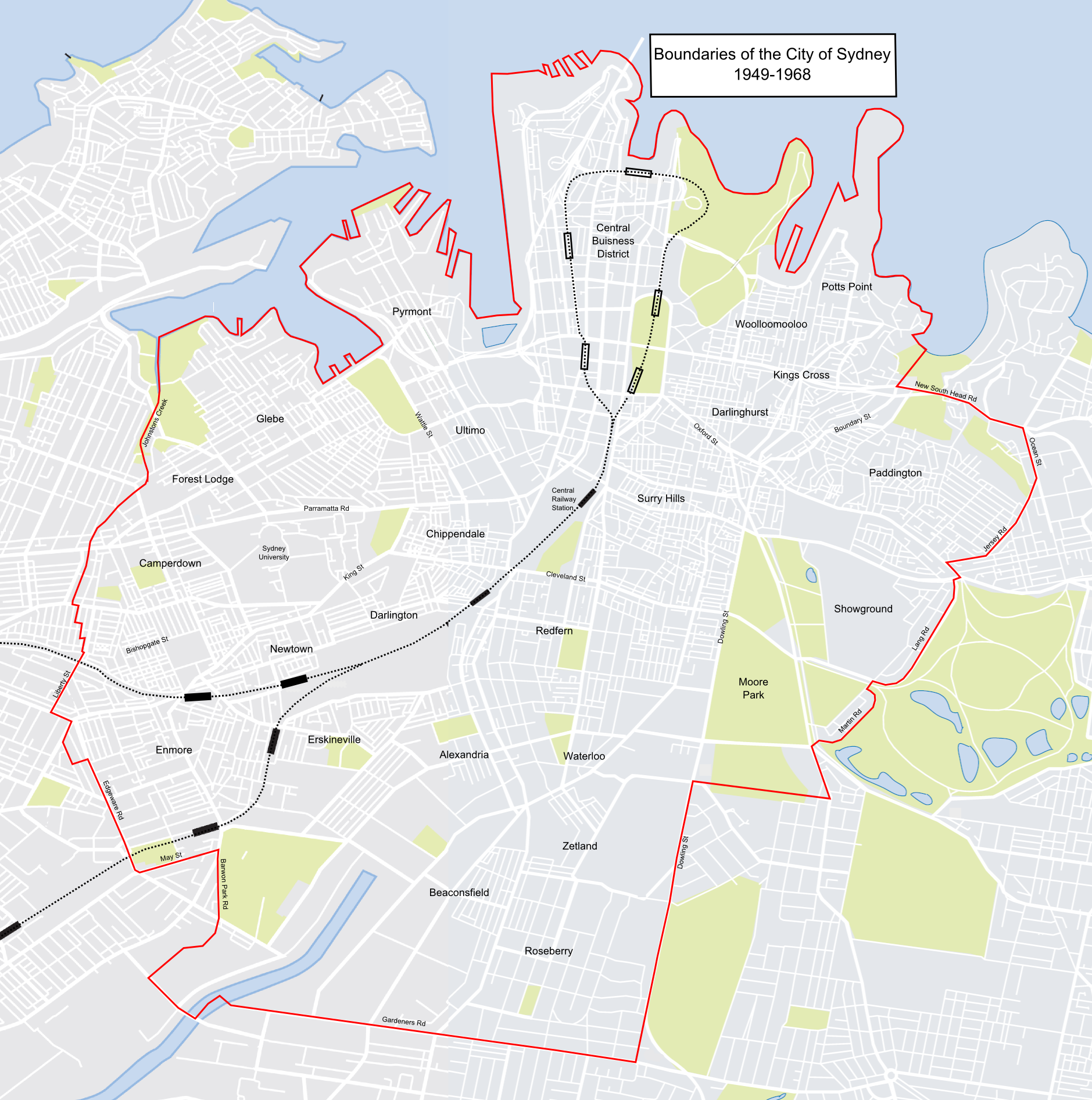
Boundaries 1949–1968

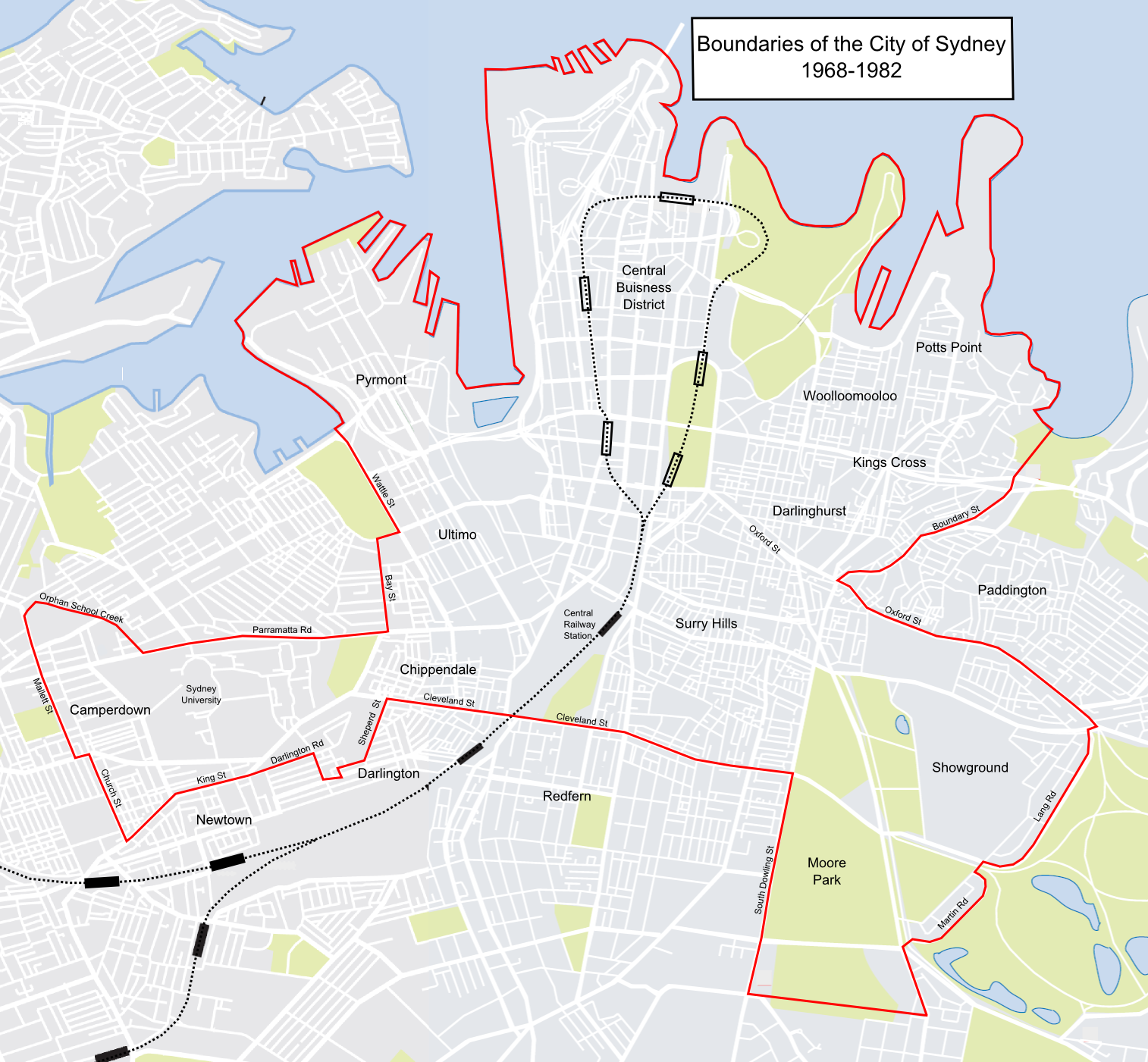
Boundaries 1968–1982

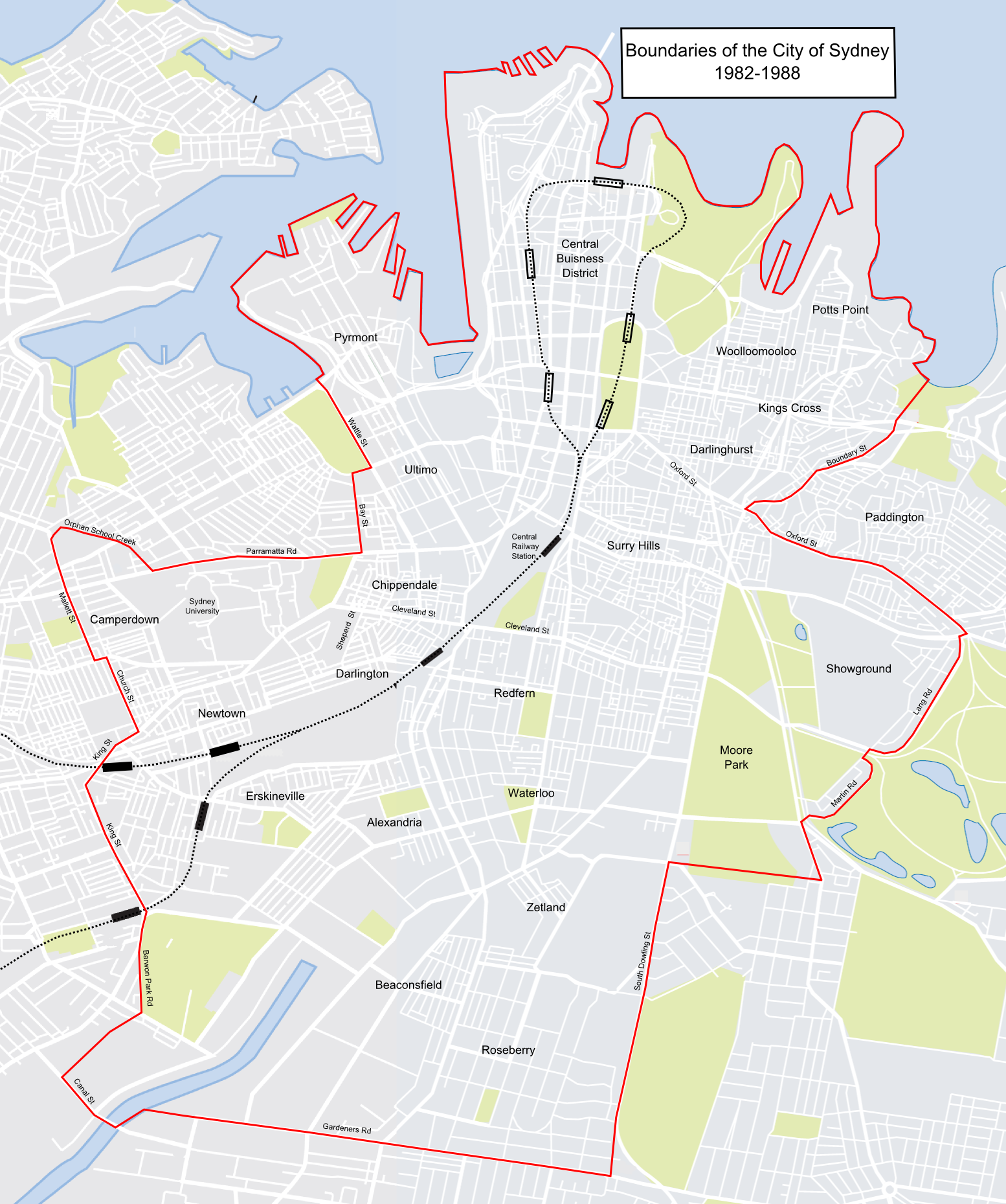
Boundaries 1982–1988

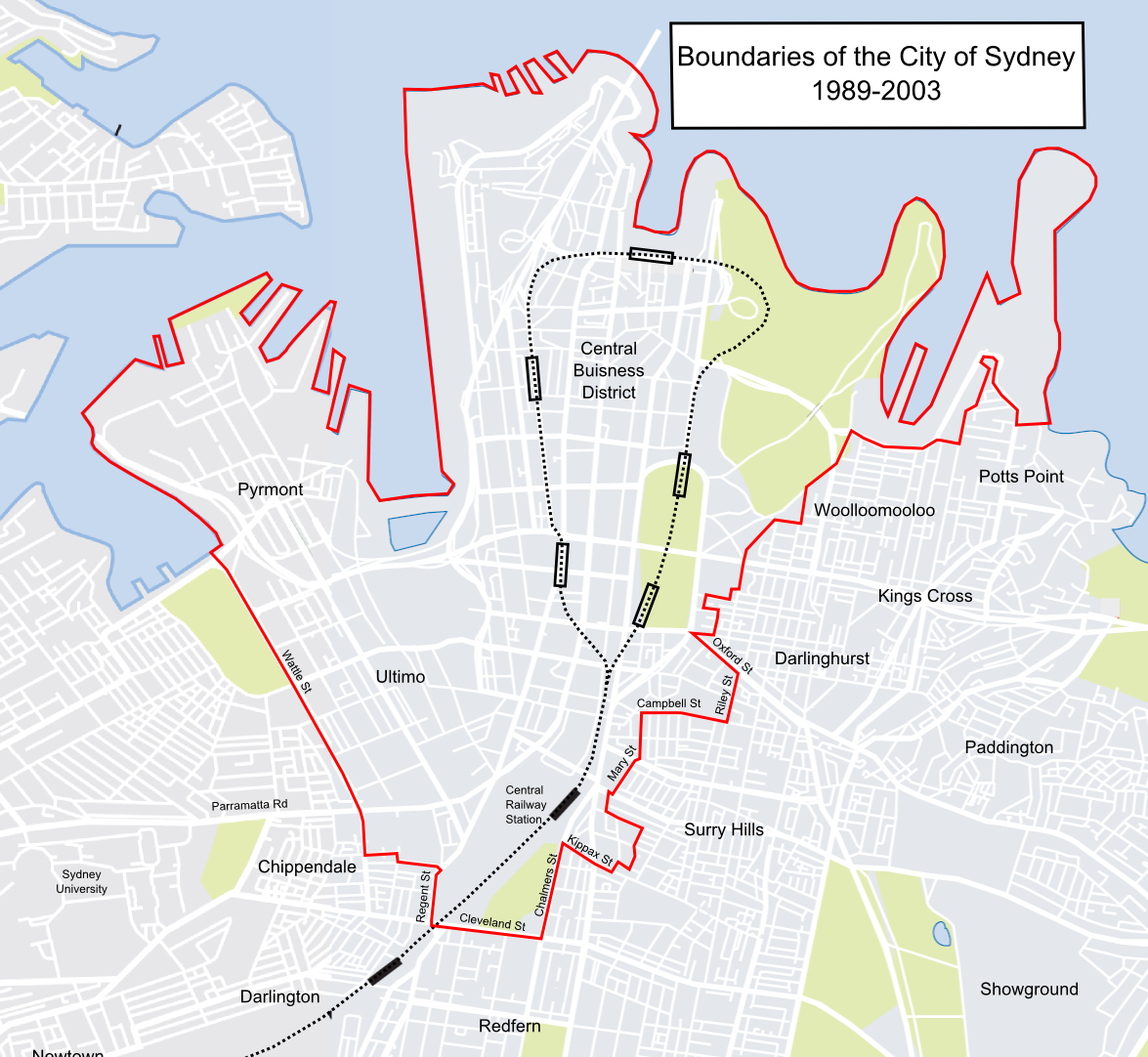
Boundaries 1989–2003

Boundaries since 2003

The postcode zone 2000 is also roughly correlative with the city centre.

== Local Government Area ==
The City of Sydney local government area covers about 26.15 square kilometres (10.10 sq mi). The Geographical Names Board of New South Wales defines suburbs as a named geographical area with defined boundaries. A suburb is also known as a locality in rural areas.

=== Suburbs ===
Suburbs within or partially within the City of Sydney are:

- Alexandria
- Barangaroo
- Beaconsfield
- Camperdown (shared with Inner West Council)
- Centennial Park (shared with City of Randwick)
- Chippendale
- Darlinghurst
- Darlington
- Dawes Point
- Elizabeth Bay
- Erskineville
- Eveleigh
- Forest Lodge
- Glebe
- Haymarket
- Millers Point
- Moore Park
- Newtown (shared with Inner West Council)
- Paddington (shared with Municipality of Woollahra)
- Potts Point
- Pyrmont
- Redfern
- Rosebery (shared with Bayside Council)
- Rushcutters Bay
- St Peters (shared with Inner West Council)
- Surry Hills
- Sydney CBD
- The Rocks
- Ultimo
- Waterloo
- Woolloomooloo
- Zetland

=== Localities ===
Localities in the City of Sydney are:

- Broadway
- Central Park
- Chinatown
- Circular Quay
- Darling Harbour
- The Domain
- East Sydney
- Garden Island
- Goat Island
- Golden Grove
- Green Square
- Kings Cross
- Macdonaldtown
- Railway Square
- Strawberry Hills
- St James
- Wynyard

=== Urban Places ===
Urban places:
The Geographical Names Board of New South Wales defines an urban place as a place, site or precinct in an urban landscape, the name of which is in current use, but the limits of which have not been defined under the address locality program.

- Argyle Cut
- Centennial Parklands Entertainment Quarter
- Central
- Chinatown
- Church Hill
- Circular Quay
- Darling Island
- Darling Square
- East Sydney
- Equality Green
- Fox Studios
- Gallows Hill
- Glebe Point
- Golden Grove
- Herald Square
- Jack Mundey Place
- Kings Cross
- Macdonaldtown
- Queens Square
- Shakespeare Place
- Strawberry Hills
- Taylor Square
- The Hungry Mile
- The University of Sydney
- Three Saints Square
- Town Hall
- Walsh Bay
- Wynyard

== Demographics ==
At the 2021 census, there were 211,632 people in the Sydney local government area, of these 52.3% were male and 47.7% were female. Aboriginal and Torres Strait Islander people made up 1.4% of the population. The median age of people in the City of Sydney was 34 years. Children aged 0 – 14 years made up 7.6% of the population and people aged 65 years and over made up 9.7% of the population. Of people in the area aged 15 years and over, 25.2% were married and 9.8% were either divorced or separated.

Population growth in the City of Sydney between the 2006 Census and the 2011 Census was 4.57%; with a significant increase of 22.93% between 2011 and 2016; and a more modest increase of 1.56% between 2016 and 2021 likely as a result of the COVID-19 pandemic. When compared with total population growth of Australia of 8.81% between 2011 and 2016, population growth in the Sydney local government area was almost triple the national average. The median weekly income for residents within the City of Sydney was just under 1.5 times the national average.

The proportion of dwellings in the City of Sydney that are apartments or units is 78.5%, which is substantially different from the Australian average of 14.2%. The proportion of residents in the Sydney local government area that claimed Australian ancestry was approximately half the national average.

Selected historical census data for Sydney local government area
Census year		2001 ^{a}	2006	2011	2016	2021
Population	Estimated residents on census night	137,641	156,571	169,505	208,374	211,632
Population	LGA rank in terms of size within New South Wales			10th	▲8th	▼12th
Population	% of New South Wales population	2.18%	▲2.39%	▲2.45%	▲2.79%	▼2.62%
Population	% of Australian population	▲0.73%	▲0.79%	0.79%	▲0.89%	▼0.83%
Population	Estimated ATSI population on census night	1,993	▼1,982	▲2,175	▲2,413	▲3,009
Population	% of ATSI population to residents	1.4%	▼1.3%	1.3%	▼1.2%	▲1.4%
Median weekly incomes						
Personal income	Median weekly personal income		A$717	A$888	A$953	$A1,241
Personal income	% of Australian median income		153.9%	153.9%	▼144.0%	▲154.2%
Family income	Median weekly family income		A$1,204	A$2,273	$A2,524	$A3,057
Family income	% of Australian median income		117.2%	▲153.5%	▼145.6%	▼144.2%
Household income	Median weekly household income		A$1,819	A$1,639	A$1,926	A$2,212
Household income	% of Australian median income		105.9%	▲132.8%	▲133.9%	▼126.7%
Dwelling structure						
Dwelling type	Flat or apartment	61.6%	▲73.7%	▼73.6%	▲77.1%	▲78.5%
Dwelling type	Semi-detached, terrace or townhouse	22.9%	▼20.2%	▲21.2%	▼19.7%	▼18.3%
Dwelling type	Separate house	2.8%	▲4.9%	▼4.2%	▼2.0%	▲2.1%
Dwelling type	Other dwellings	1.5%	▼1.0%	▼0.3%	▲0.5%	▲0.6%
Dwelling type	Unoccupied dwellings	10.2%	▼8.5%	▲11.2%	▲11.9%	▲16.1%

Selected historical census data for Sydney local government area
Ancestry, top responses
2001^{a}		2006		2011		2016		2021	
No Data		No Data		English	19.3%	English	▼18.1%	English	25.1%
No Data		No Data		Australian	13.9%	Chinese	▲13.4%	Australian	16.8%
No Data		No Data		Chinese	9.7%	Australian	▼11.9%	Chinese	16.8%
No Data		No Data		Irish	8.5%	Irish	▼8.0%	Irish	10.7%
No Data		No Data		Scottish	5.8%	Scottish	▼5.3%	Scottish	7.5%
Country of birth, top responses
2001^{a}		2006		2011		2016		2021	
Australia	41.1%	Australia	▼40.5%	Australia	▲44.0%	Australia	▼39.4%	Australia	▲44.6%
United Kingdom	5.0%	England	▼4.2%	China	▲5.4%	China	▲9.7%	China	▼7.8%
New Zealand	3.5%	China	▲3.5%	England	▲4.9%	England	▼4.5%	England	▲4.8%
China	2.2%	New Zealand	▼3.0%	New Zealand	▲3.3%	Thailand	▲3.3%	Thailand	▼3.0%
Indonesia	1.9%	Indonesia	▲2.0%	Indonesia	▲2.2%	New Zealand	▼2.6%	Indonesia	▲2.7%
Hong Kong	1.0%	South Korea	▲1.6%	Thailand	▲2.1%	Indonesia	▲2.5%	New Zealand	▲2.7%
Language, top responses (other than English)
2001^{a}		2006		2011		2016		2021	
Cantonese	2.9%	Mandarin	▲3.7%	Mandarin	▲5.1%	Mandarin	▲9.9%	Mandarin	▼8.6%
Mandarin	2.2%	Cantonese	▲3.3%	Cantonese	▼3.2%	Thai	▲3.2%	Cantonese	▼2.8%
Indonesian	1.6%	Indonesian	▲1.7%	Thai	▲2.1%	Cantonese	▼2.9%	Thai	▼2.8%
Greek	1.5%	Korean	▲1.6%	Indonesian	▲1.9%	Indonesian	▲2.2%	Spanish	▲2.4%
Russian	1.2%	Greek	▼1.3%	Korean	1.6%	Spanish	▲1.7%	Indonesian	▼2.1%
Religious affiliation, top responses
2001^{a}		2006		2011		2016		2021	
No Religion	19.0%	No Religion	▲23.7%	No Religion	▲33.6%	No Religion	▲43.2%	No Religion	▲51.0%
Catholic	18.4%	Catholic	▼18.3%	Catholic	▲19.0%	Not Stated	15.8%	Catholic	▼15.2%
Anglican	11.1%	Anglican	▼10.0%	Anglican	▼9.0%	Catholic	▼15.4%	Not Stated	8.4%
Buddhism	4.2%	Buddhism	▲5.2%	Buddhism	▲6.5%	Buddhism	▲7.0%	Buddhism	▼6.5%
Eastern Orthodox	2.7%	Eastern Orthodox	▼2.6%	Eastern Orthodox	2.6%	Anglican	▼5.8%	Anglican	▼4.9%

^a 2001 Census data comprise the sum of the former South Sydney and the former Sydney local government areas with the addition of localities Glebe and Forest Lodge.

== Council ==
City of Sydney Council

Leadership
- Lord Mayor: Clover Moore (Team Clover)
- Deputy Lord Mayor: Zann Maxwell (Labor)
- Chief Executive Officer: Monica Barone

Structure
- Seats: 10 including the Lord Mayor
- Political groups: Team Clover (4); Labor (3); Greens (2); Liberal (1)

Elections
- Voting system: Single transferable vote
- Last election: 14 September 2024
- Next election: 16 September 2028

Meeting place
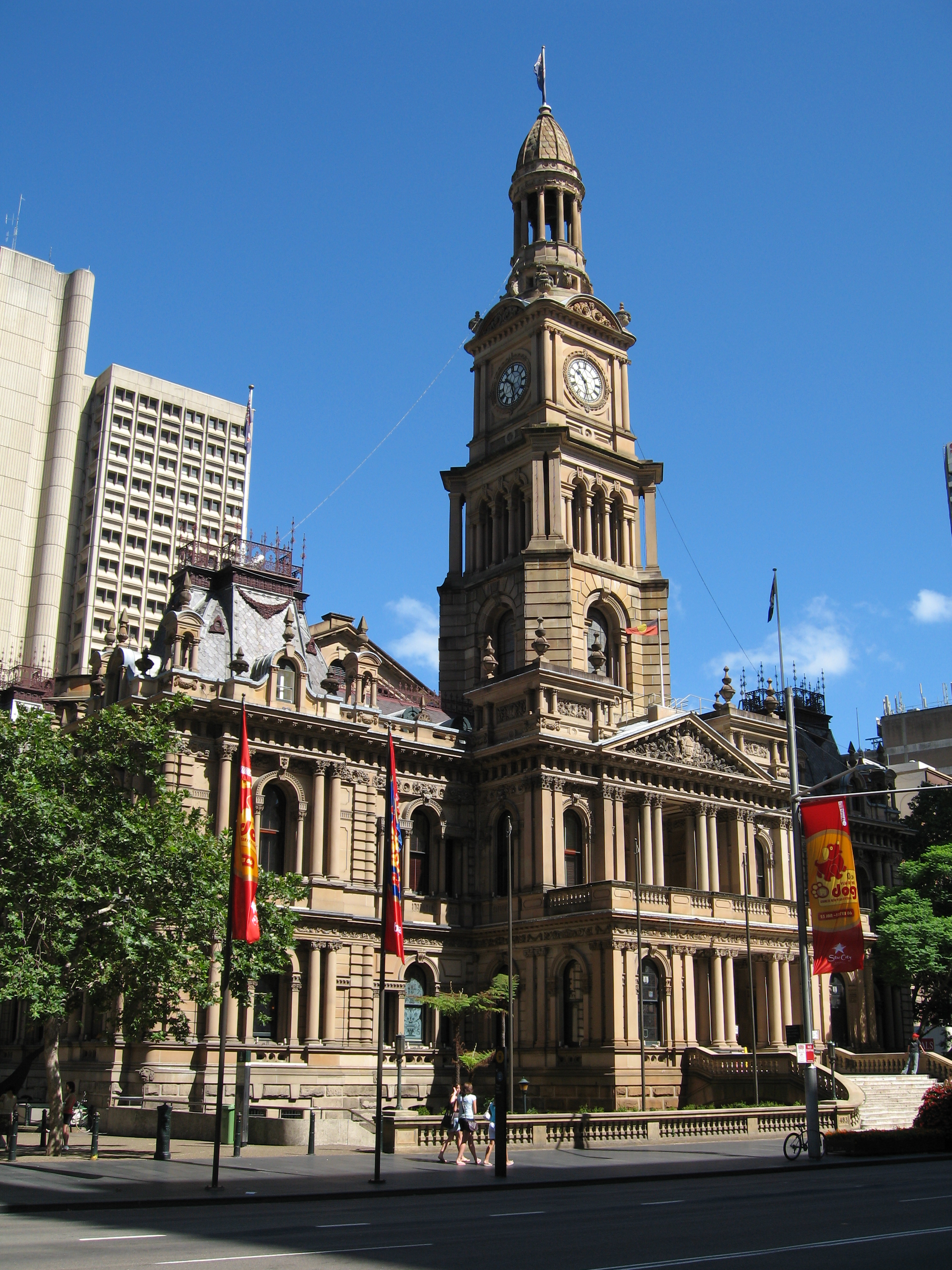
- Sydney Town Hall, seat of the City Council

=== Current composition and election method ===
Sydney City Council is composed of ten Councillors, including the Lord Mayor, for a fixed four-year term of office. The Lord Mayor is directly elected while the nine other Councillors are elected proportionally. The Deputy Lord Mayor is elected annually by the councillors.

The most recent election was held on 14 September 2024, and the makeup of the council, including the Lord Mayor, is as follows:

Party	Councillors
Clover Moore Independent Team	4
Australian Labor Party	3
The Greens	2
Liberal Party of Australia	1
Total	10

The current Council, elected in 2024, in order of election, is:

Lord Mayor	Party	Notes
Clover Moore	Clover Moore Independents	Lord Mayor, 2004–present. MP for Sydney and Bligh 1988–2012.
Councillor	Party	Notes
Zann Maxwell	Labor	Deputy Lord Mayor, 2024–present.
Lyndon Gannon	Liberal	
Sylvie Ellsmore	Greens	Marrickville Council Councillor, 2012–2016; Deputy Lord Mayor, 2022–2023.
Robert Kok	Clover Moore Independents	Elected 2008; Deputy Lord Mayor, 2011–2012, 2023–2024
Jess Miller	Clover Moore Independents	Elected 2016–2021; Deputy Lord Mayor, 2017–2018
Adam Worling	Clover Moore Independents	
Olly Arkins	Labor	First transgender person elected to Sydney City Council.
Yvonne Weldon	Labor	Elected as an independent candidate, joined the Labor Party in April 2026.
Matthew Thompson	Greens	BDE

=== Business vote ===
Unlike all other local government area in NSW (which are governed under the Local Government Act, 1993), the City of Sydney is governed under the City of Sydney Act, 1988. On 25 September 2014, the NSW Liberal/National Coalition Government of Mike Baird, in conjunction with the Shooters and Fishers Party in the Legislative Council, passed the City of Sydney Amendment (Elections) Act, 2014, which allowed businesses to have two votes each in City of Sydney elections via a compulsory non-resident register that is maintained at the expense of the City Council.

Implemented for the 2016 election and maintained by Council at an annual cost of $1.7 million, the additional business roll was widely criticised as being an infringement on the democratic process and an attempt to gerrymander election results by the Liberal/National Coalition. At the time of the bill ABC election analyst, Antony Green, noted: "For eight decades both sides of NSW politics have viewed Sydney's Lord Mayoralty as a bauble to be delivered as soon as possible to someone that the new government thinks is right and proper to hold the position [...] Given the history ... it is a little difficult to view the proposed changes as anything other than being a state government trying again to get its way on who should be Lord Mayor of Sydney."

The Lord Mayor Clover Moore also expressed her opposition, seeing it as another attempt to attack her administration and that the new compulsory business register "placed an unworkable and costly burden on the council [...] One of the great flaws of the legislation was that it gives businesses two votes and residents just one, completely reversing one of the founding principles of Australia’s democracy: one vote, one value. [It] was not about business voting at all – it was about manipulating democracy." Moore's position has been supported by several community groups and also Labor Councillor and President of Local Government NSW, Linda Scott, who expressed her view that the business vote is "complex, costly and has no clear public benefit." However, one supporter of the business vote was former councillor Angela Vithoulkas: "Businesses and property owners pay over 72% of the rates [in the City of Sydney], they deserve to have a voice and exercise their democratic right." Following the 2021 council elections, the NSW Electoral Commission issued 18,501 failure to vote notices and fines to non-residential electors in the City of Sydney, representing 39% of all non-residential electors for the area.

On 13 September 2023, Ron Hoenig, the Minister for Local Government in the new Labor state government of Chris Minns, announced that the government had introduced the City of Sydney Amendment Bill 2023 and planned to be implemented at the next elections scheduled for September 2024, that would reverse the 2014 amendment act and remove the compulsory double business voting roll, and return to the system of optional single business voting. On this announcement Hoenig commented: "The amendments were made by the Liberals in a brazen attempt to oust Sydney Lord Mayor Clover Moore from office and give the party an electoral advantage in controlling the Sydney Town Hall. As expected, the amendments have clearly missed their target with thousands of non-resident ratepayers being slugged with fines for not voting instead. For nearly a decade, City of Sydney ratepayers have also been forced to foot an annual bill of approximately $1 million to maintain the non-residential electoral roll. Nowhere else in this state do we see one group of voters favoured in this way. It erodes the democratic process and undermines the vital importance of giving residents and ratepayers a balanced voice in local council elections." The City of Sydney Amendment Act 2023 passed the Parliament on 21 September, and received royal assent from the Governor on 27 September 2023, returning to the optional single business vote in city elections.

== Policies, services and initiatives ==
=== Environment ===
The City of Sydney has adopted various policies to reduce the council's climate impact, including strategies implemented since the 2000s to reduce car pollution by investing in mass and public transit and introducing a fleet of 10 new Nissan Leaf electric cars, the largest order of the vehicle in Australia. The council has also invested in bicycle infrastructure, and cycling trips have increased by 113% across Sydney's inner-city since March 2010, with approximately 2,000 bikes passing through top peak-hour intersections on an average weekday.

The City of Sydney became the first council in Australia to achieve formal certification as carbon-neutral in 2008. The city has reduced its 2007 carbon emissions by 6% and since 2006 has reduced carbon emissions from city buildings by up to 20%. In 2008, the council adopted the Sustainable Sydney 2030 program, which outlined various energy targets, such as a comprehensive plan to reduce energy in homes and offices within Sydney by 30%. In the commercial space, reductions in energy consumption have decreased energy bills by $30 million a year in more than half of office spaces, and solar panels] have been installed on many CBD buildings in an effort to minimise carbon pollution by around 3,000 tonnes a year. Sydney has become a leader in the development of green office buildings and enforcing the requirement of all building proposals to be energy-efficient.

The One Central Park development, completed in 2013, is an example of this implementation and design.

=== Sydney Peace Prize ===
The City of Sydney is a major supporter of the Sydney Peace Prize.

=== Aboriginal cooperation ===
The City of Sydney has a Principles of Cooperation agreement with the Metropolitan Local Aboriginal Land Council, establishing a framework for communication, consultation and the consideration of development proposals affecting Aboriginal interests within the local government area.

== Sister cities ==
Sydney City Council maintains sister city relations with the following cities:

- San Francisco, California, United States, since 1968
- Nagoya, Japan, since 1980
- Wellington, New Zealand, since 1982
- (United Kingdom) Portsmouth, England, since 1984
- Guangzhou, China, since 1986
- Florence, Tuscany, Italy, since 1986

=== Friendship cities ===
- Paris, France, since 1998
- Berlin, Germany, since 2000
- Athens, Greece, since 2000
- (Republic of Ireland) Dublin, Ireland, since 2002
- Chicago, Illinois, United States, since 21 February 2019 (The City of Sydney considers the City of Chicago a "friendship city", while the City of Chicago considers the City of Sydney a "sister city.")
- Wuhan, China, since 2014
