= Eveleigh =

- Suburb
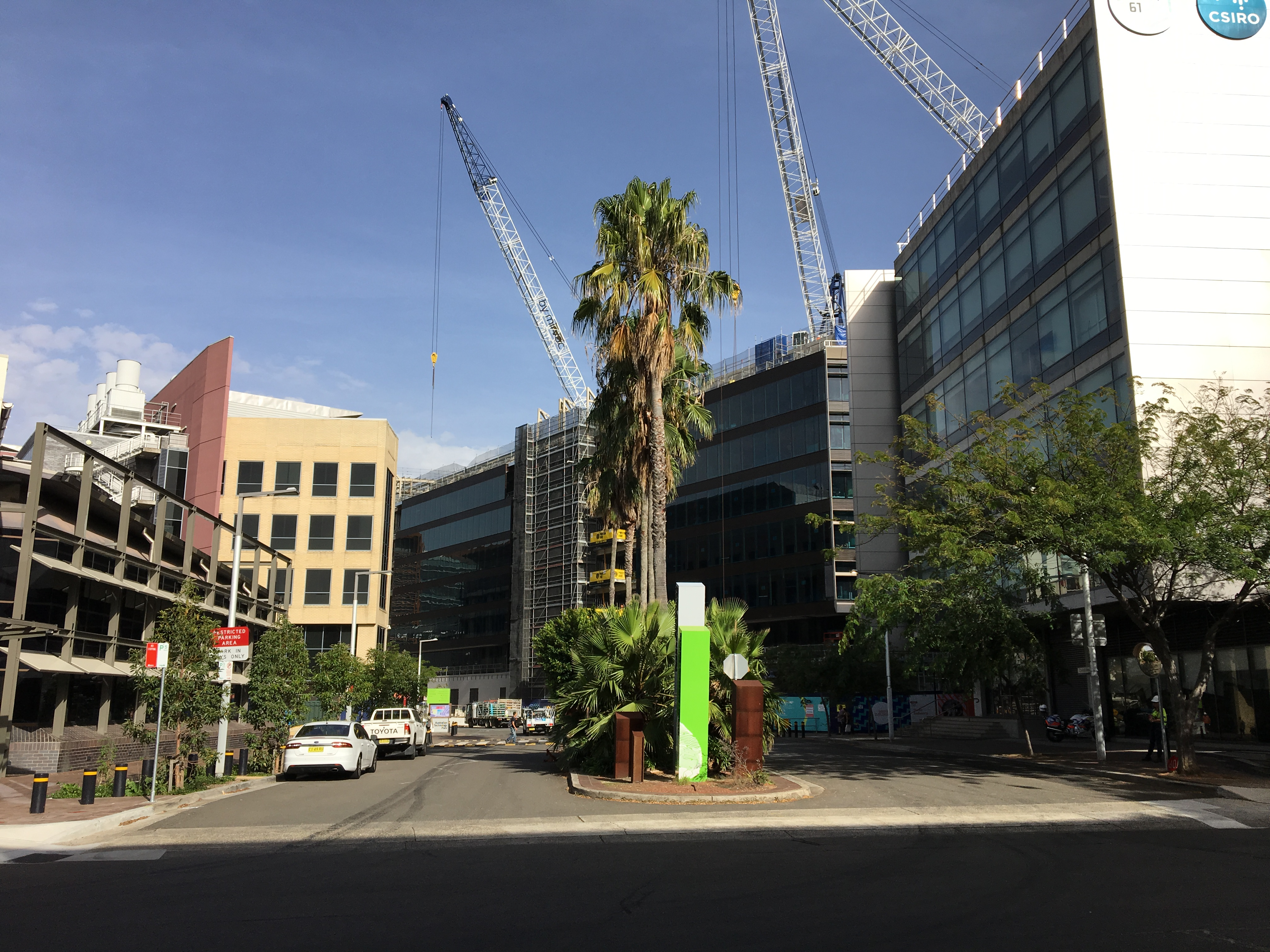
- South Eveleigh

- Interactive map of Eveleigh
- Country: Australia
- State: New South Wales
- City: Sydney
- LGA: City of Sydney
- Location: 3 km (1.9 mi) south of Sydney CBD

Government
  - State electorate: Newtown
  - Federal division: Sydney

Area
  - Total: 0.53 km^{2} (0.20 sq mi)

Population
  - Total: 606 (SAL 2021)
  - Density: 1,143/km^{2} (2,960/sq mi)
- Postcode: 2015
Suburbs around Eveleigh
Newtown	Darlington	Redfern
Newtown	Eveleigh	Redfern
Erskineville	Alexandria	Waterloo

Eveleigh is an Inner South suburb of Sydney, New South Wales, Australia. Eveleigh is located about 3 kilometres south of the Sydney central business district and is part of the local government area of the City of Sydney.

== History ==
Eveleigh was named after the estate of Lieutenant J. R. Holden, so called after his birthplace in England. Much of the suburb of Redfern was known as Eveleigh in the early days of the region's settlement. In fact, Redfern railway station was originally known as Eveleigh railway station. The Eveleigh railway yards were located immediately south-west of the station.

Following the nationalisation of failed private railways, construction began in the early 1880s on a new workshops complex, occupying an area of over 60 acres (240,000 m^{2}), bounded by North Newtown, Darlington, Erskineville, Redfern, Alexandria and Chippendale. Originally the workshops serviced and repaired the growing NSW rail fleet, but in 1908 Eveleigh began manufacturing steam locomotives. By this time more than 3000 people were employed at the site. Many workers lived in the area, but many lived in other suburbs and until the 1980s commuting workers alighted at the purpose-built Macdonaldtown station, located in the middle of the complex.

Included in the complex was a running shed, opened in 1884, for steam locomotives used in the daily duties of train haulage. Originally of three bays, the first was demolished about 1925 and the remaining two in the early 1960s.

In 1989, part of the site was used to house Paddy's Markets, while the original site at Haymarket was being redeveloped.

=== Eveleigh Workshops ===
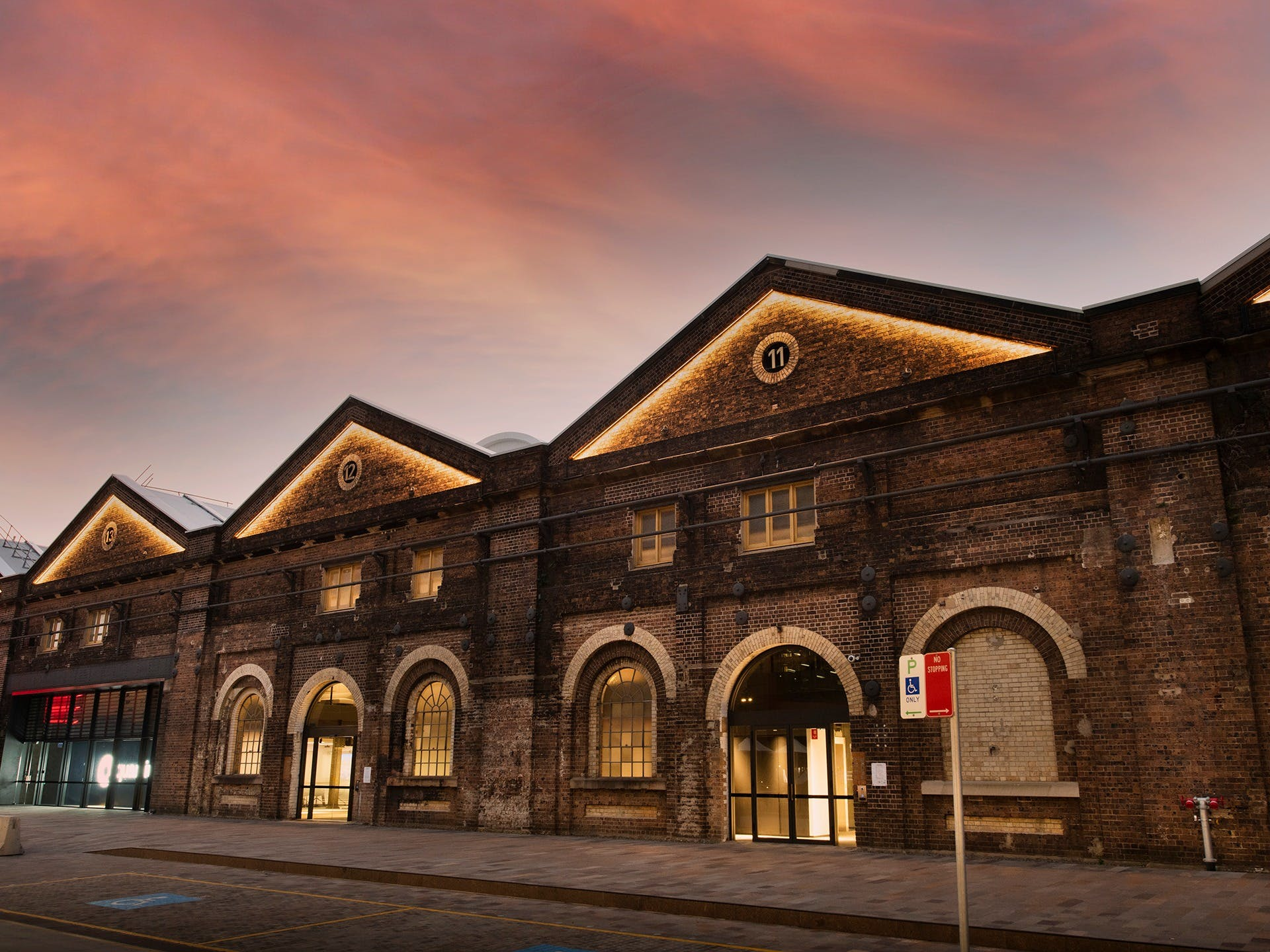
Eveleigh Railway Workshops

The Eveleigh Railway Workshops are of great significance to Australia's industrial, military and social history. Eveleigh manufactured the first steam locomotives made in Australia, and it contains the most complete set of late nineteenth and early twentieth century light and medium engineering technologies in Australia (much of which is now preserved in an industrial museum in Bays 1 and 2 of the old Locomotive Workshop).

The Eveleigh site was also used to manufacture munitions in both World War I and World War II.

Eveleigh is also significant in the history of Australian unionism. In 1892, unions successfully negotiated to establish a six-day working week, and the 1917 General Strike, which began with the 3,000 workers at Eveleigh, eventually spread across Australia, involving almost 100,000 nationwide.

The locomotive workshop was closed in 1988 and the main rail workshops were moved to Enfield. 3801 Limited occupied the Large Erecting Shop from 1986 to 2017.

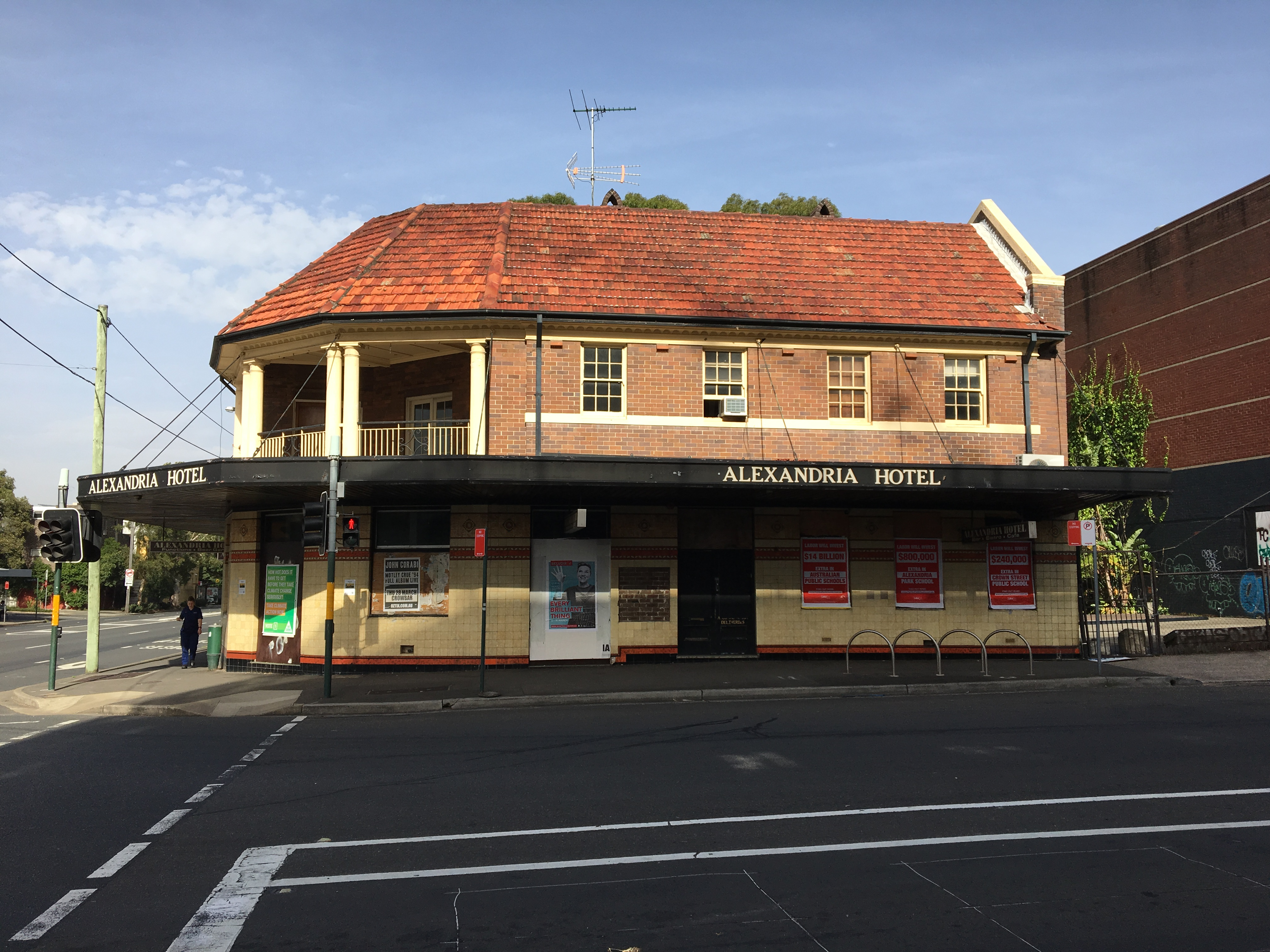
Alexandria Hotel

=== Public Housing Estates ===
The Eveleigh area is largely social housing, and home to 4 housing estates in its proximity, most notably the estate of 1-2 story townhouses centred around South Sydney rotary park, developed in the Early 1990s along with 2 other estates nearby on Golden grove street and Newton street built around 5-10 years earlier.

Recently, a residential area in carriageworks was redeveloped, being replaced with a unit block of mostly social and community housing, the north Eveleigh precinct redevelopment was completed in 2018. Not long after, another much older run down housing block across Wilson street from carriageworks was completely demolished a year later and is currently being redeveloped

The South Eveleigh Housing Estate around Explorer street is currently under threat of demolition.

== Transport ==
Eveleigh is separated from Darlington by a large railway corridor. There have been various proposals to build a pedestrian and cycling bridge to address this severance.

A June 2025 Transport for NSW report outlined an Eveleigh bridge concept.

== Population ==
At the 2021 census, the population had decreased to 606 residents, from 663 residents in 2016. 56.4% of people were born in Australia and 60.6% of people only spoke English at home. The most common responses for religion were No Religion 47.0% and Catholic 21.8%.

== Developments ==
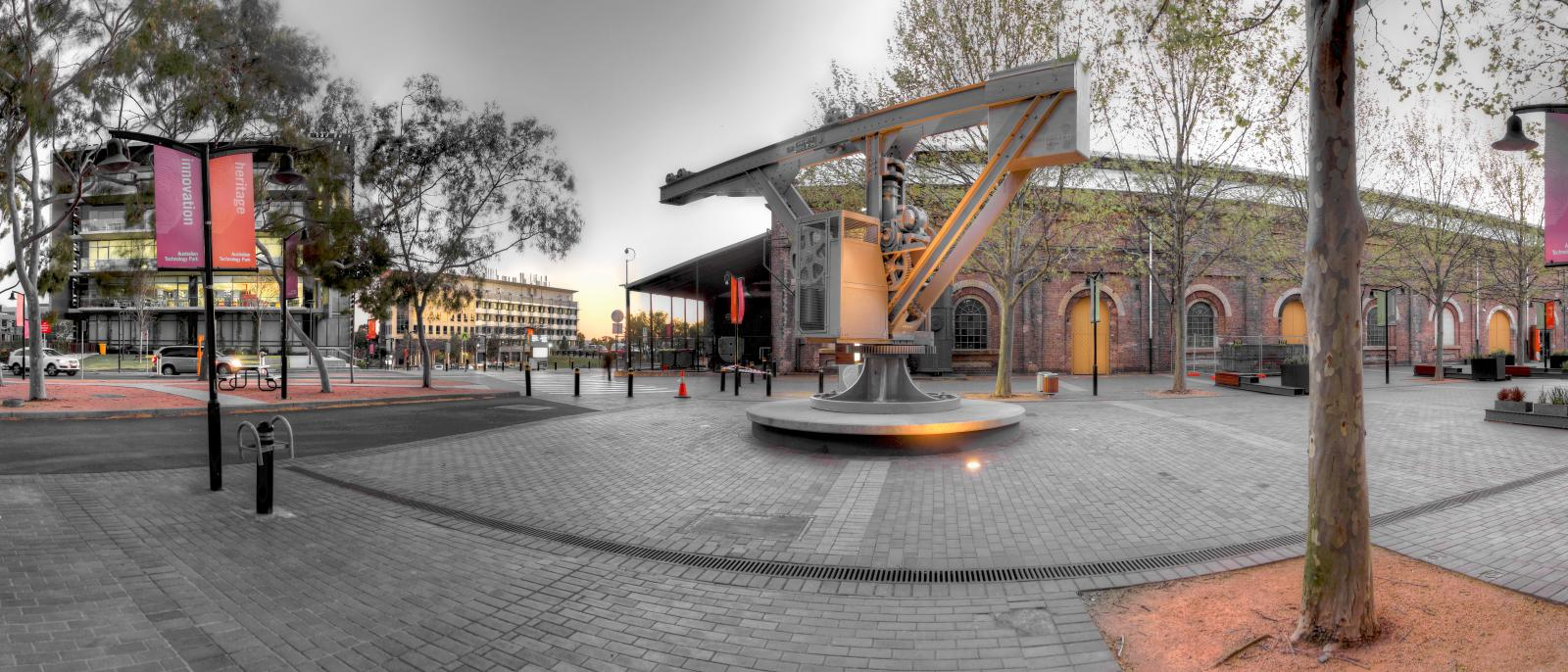
Australian Technology Park

In 1991, the Government of New South Wales established a consortium including the University of Sydney, University of Technology Sydney and University of New South Wales which transformed Alexandria side of the workshops site into the Australian Technology Park. Another section of the old workshops, which faces onto Wilson Street, has recently been converted into a large theatre space.

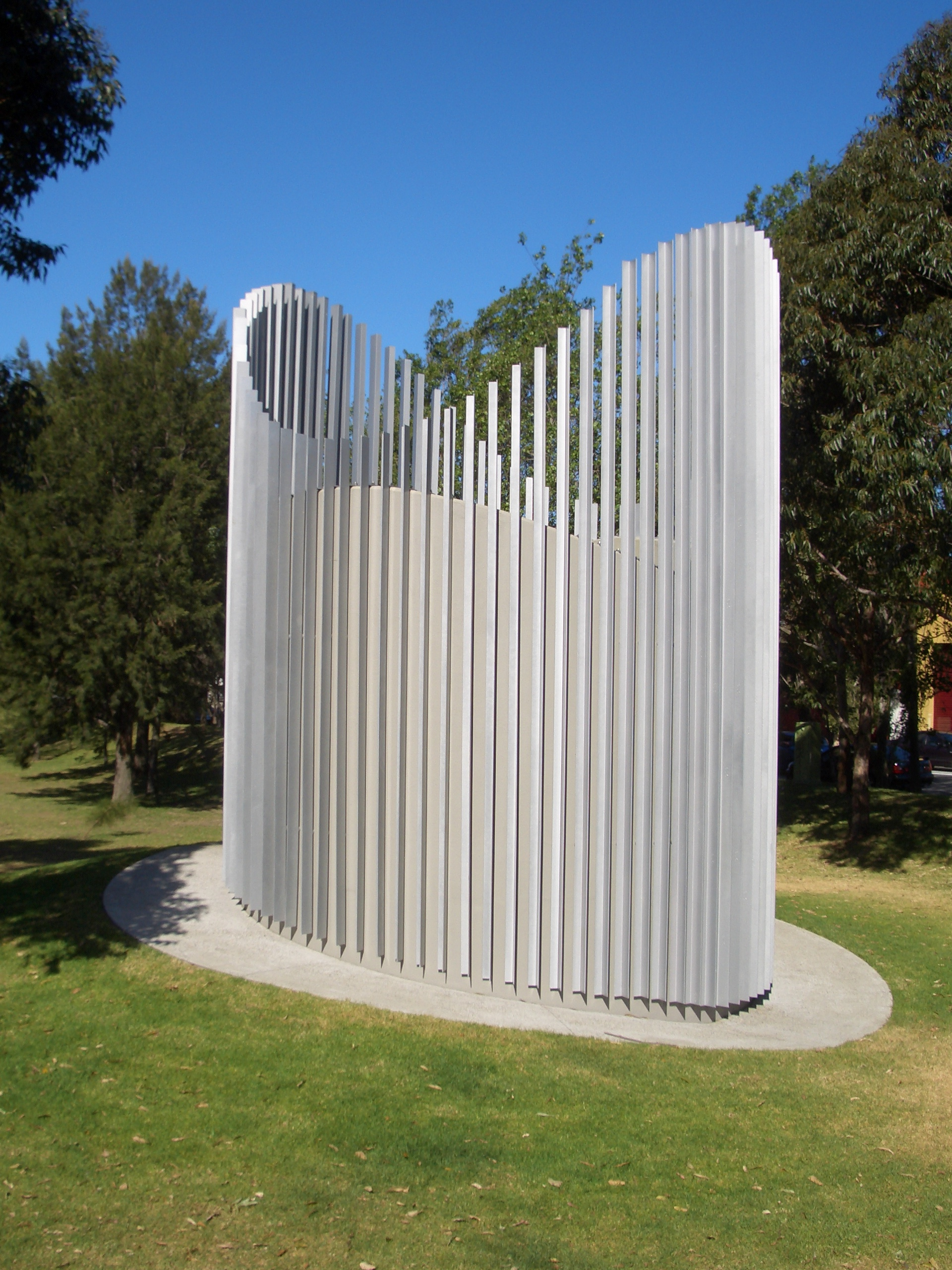
Vice Chancellor's Oval

South Eveleigh occupies the site of the former Eveleigh railway yards. It is the home of a growing community of researchers, entrepreneurs, incubator businesses, start-ups, mature technology companies and education organisations.

The ATP buildings are also frequently used as locations for advertisements and television programs including MasterChef Australia. So You Think You Can Dance and the auditions of Australian Idol. The ATP site will also soon house extensive film and television production facilities including a new digital film making studio built by production company Kennedy Miller Mitchell for the filming of Mad Max 4 and Happy Feet 2. The Seven Network and outside broadcast company NEP Group are housed within four purpose-built high definition television studios.
